= Baeksang Arts Award for Best Actor – Film =

Annual South Korean film award

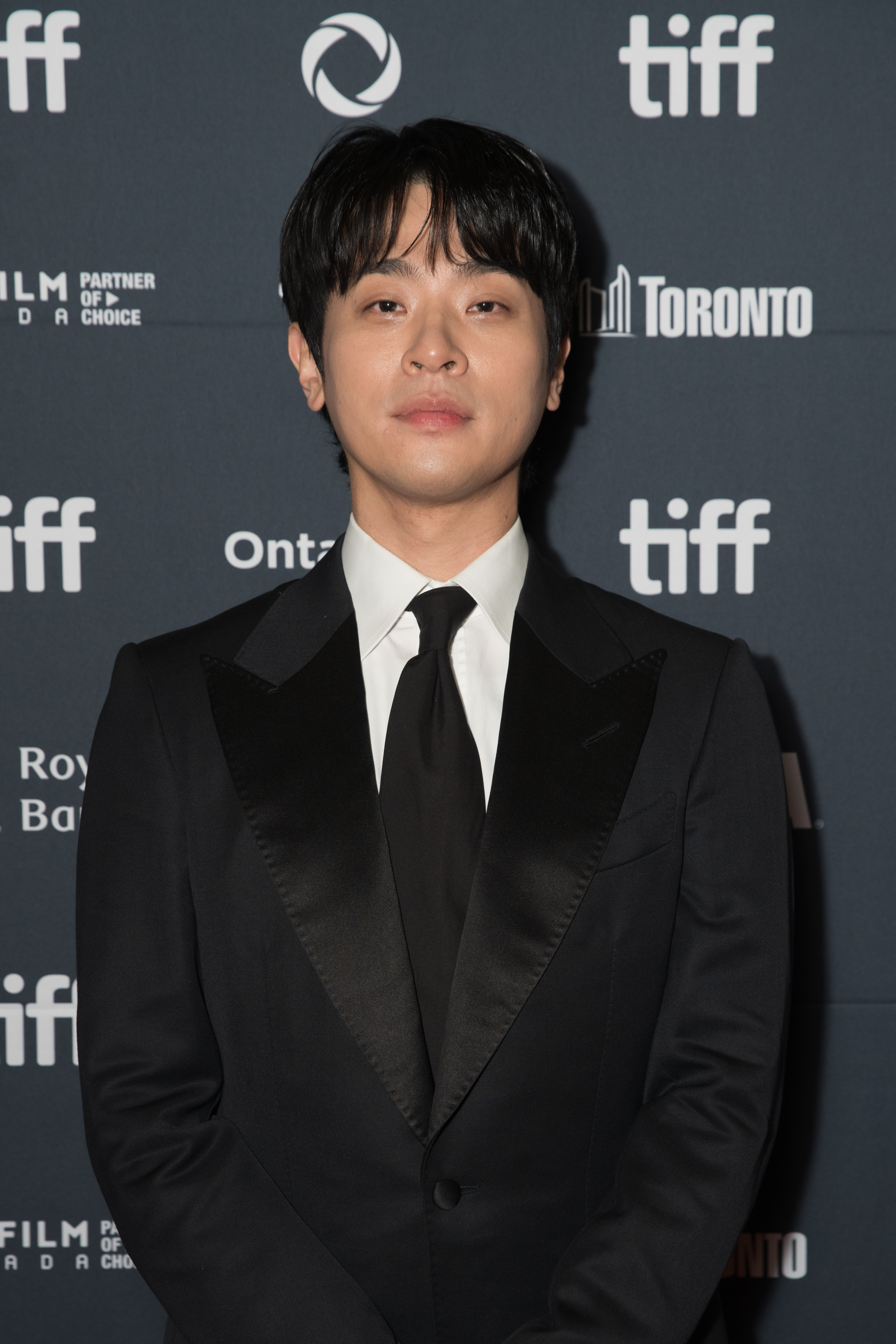
- 2026 recipient: Park Jeong-min
- Awarded for: Best performance by an actor in a leading role in a South Korean film
- Country: South Korea
- Presented by: Baeksang Arts Awards
- Most recent winner: Park Jeong-min; The Ugly (2026)
- Website: baeksangartsawards

The Baeksang Arts Award for Best Actor – Film (Korean: 백상예술대상 영화부문 남자 최우수 연기상; RR: Baeksang Yesul Daesang Yeonghwa Bumun Namja Choeusu Yeongisang) is an award presented annually at the Baeksang Arts Awards ceremony organised by Ilgan Sports and JTBC Plus, affiliates of JoongAng Ilbo, usually in the second quarter of each year in Seoul.

== Winners and nominees ==
Table key
‡	Indicates the winner

=== 1960s and 1970s ===
Year	Winner	Film	Original title	Role(s)
1965 (1st)	Kim Jin-kyu ‡	Deaf Sam-yong	벙어리 삼룡	Sam-yong
1966 (2nd)	Shin Young-kyun ‡	The Sea Village	갯마을	Sang-soo
1967 (3rd)	Kim Jin-kyu ‡	The Sun Rises Again	태양은 다시 뜬다	
1968 (4th)	Choi Nam-hyun ‡	Legend of Ssarigol	싸리꼴의 신화	
1969 (5th)	Shin Young-kyun ‡	Prince Daewon	대원군	Heungseon Daewongun
1970 (6th)	Hwang Hae ‡	The Old Jar Craftsman	독짓는 늙은이	Old Man Song
1971 (7th)	Choi Moo-ryong ‡	Please Turn Off the Light	방에 불을 꺼주오	Kang-young
1972 (8th)	Heo Jang-kang ‡	Bun-rye's Story	분례기	Yong Pal-il
1973 (9th)	Namkoong Won ‡	Insect Woman	충녀	Dong Shik
1974 (10th)	Hah Myung-joong ‡	Me, Myself, and I	나와 나	
1975 (11th)	Kim Jin-kyu ‡	A Story of Crazy Painter: Gwanghwasa	광화사	
1975 (11th)	Baek Il-seob ‡	The Executioner	망나니	
1976 (12th)	Kim Hee-ra ‡	Last Embrace	마지막 포옹	Hak-su
1977 (13th)	Lee Soon-jae ‡	Concentration of Attention	집념	Heo Jun
1978 (14th)	Shin Seong-il ‡	Winter Woman	겨울여자	Heo-min
1978 (14th)	Hwang Hae ‡	Floating Plants	부초	
1979 (15th)	Park Geun-hyung ‡	The Swamp of Exile	망명의 늪	

=== 1980s ===
Year	Winner	Film	Original title	Role(s)
1980 (16th)	Lee Dae-keun ‡	Wild Ginseng	심봤다	
1981 (17th)	Sin Yeong-il ‡	The Man Who Dies Every Day	매일 죽는 남자	
1982 (18th)	Ahn Sung-ki ‡	Mandala	만다라	Beop-un
1983 (19th)	Ahn Sung-ki ‡	Village in the Mist	안개마을	Kae-Cheol
1984 (20th)	Ahn Sung-ki ‡	The Flower at the Equator	적도의 꽃	Mister M
1985 (21st)	Ahn Sung-ki ‡	Deep Blue Night	깊고 푸른밤	Baek Ho-bin
1986 (22nd)	Lee Young-ha ‡	Fire Women Village	화녀촌	Jong-sub
1987 (23rd)	Shin Seong-il ‡	Lethe's Love Song	레테의 연가	Han Seung-woo
1988 (24th)	Lee Deok-hwa ‡	You My Rose Mellow	접시꽃 당신	Jong-hwan
1989 (25th)	Ahn Sung-ki ‡	The Age of Success	성공시대	Kim Pan-chok

=== 1990s ===
Year	Winner	Film	Original title	Role(s)
1990 (26th)	Park Joong-hoon ‡	The Lovers of Woomook-baemi	우묵배미의 사랑	Il-do
1991 (27th)	Ahn Sung-ki ‡	Who Saw The Dragon's Toenails	누가 용의 발톱을 보았는가	Choi Jong-su
1992 (28th)	Yu In-chon ‡	Kim's War	김의 전쟁	Kwon Hee-ro
1992 (28th)	Moon Sung-keun	The Road To The Racetrack	경마장 가는 길	R
1992 (28th)	Lee Deok-hwa	Fly High Run Far	개벽	Hae-weol, Choe Si-hyeong
1993 (29th)	Lee Geung-young ‡	White Badge	하얀전쟁	Pyon Chin-su
1993 (29th)	Ahn Sung-ki	The Blue in You	그대 안의 블루	Lee Ho-seok
1993 (29th)	Choi Min-soo	Marriage Story	결혼이야기	Kim Tae-gyu
1993 (29th)	Jeong Bo-seok	Walking All the Way to Heaven	걸어서 하늘까지	Mul-sae
1994 (30th)	Ahn Sung-ki ‡	Two Cops	투캅스	Detective Jo
1994 (30th)	Park Joong-hoon	Two Cops	투캅스	Detective Kang
1994 (30th)	Moon Sung-keun	To the Starry Island	그 섬에 가고싶다	Moon Jae-goo / Moon Duck-bae
1994 (30th)	Kim Myung-gon	Seopyeonje	서편제	Yu-bong
1995 (31st)	Kim Kap-soo ‡	The Taebaek Mountains	태백산맥	Yum Sang-jin
1995 (31st)	Park Joong-hoon	How to Top My Wife	마누라 죽이기	Park Bong-soo
1995 (31st)	Moon Sung-keun	To You from Me	너에게 나를 보낸다	I
1995 (31st)	Ahn Sung-ki	The Eternal Empire	영원한 제국	Jeongjo of Joseon
1996 (32nd)	Lee Geung-young ‡	Runaway	런어웨이	Detective Jang
1996 (32nd)	Choi Min-soo	The Terrorist	테러리스트	Oh Soo-hyun
1996 (32nd)	Hong Kyung-in	A Single Spark	아름다운 청년 전태일	Jeon Tae-il
1996 (32nd)	Han Suk-kyu	Dr. Bong	닥터 봉	Bong Joon-soo
1997 (33rd)	Han Suk-kyu ‡	Green Fish	초록 물고기	Kim Mak-dong
1997 (33rd)	Moon Sung-keun	Green Fish	초록 물고기	Bae Tae-gon
1997 (33rd)	Ahn Sung-ki	Festival	축제	Lee Jun-seob
1997 (33rd)	Park Sang-min	Come to Me	나에게 오라	Chun-keun
1998 (34th)	Park Joong-hoon ‡	Hallelujah	할렐루야	Yang Duck-gun
1998 (34th)	Han Suk-kyu	Christmas in August	8월의 크리스마스	Yu Jung-won
1998 (34th)	Choi Min-soo	Blackjack	블랙잭	Oh Sae-keun
1998 (34th)	Park Geun-hyung	Father	아버지	Father, Han Jung-soo
1998 (34th)	Park Shin-yang	The Letter	편지	Cho Hwan-yoo
1999 (35th)	Choi Min-sik ‡	Shiri	쉬리	Park Mu-young
1999 (35th)	Park Shin-yang	A Promise	약속	Gong Sang-du
1999 (35th)	Lee Jung-jae	City of the Rising Sun	태양은 없다	Cho Hong-ki
1999 (35th)	Han Suk-kyu	Shiri	쉬리	Yoo Joong-won

=== 2000s ===
Year	Winner	Film	Original title	Role(s)
2000 (36th)	Park Joong-hoon ‡	Nowhere to Hide	인정사정 볼 것 없다	Detective Woo Young-min
2000 (36th)	Choi Min-sik	Happy End	해피엔드	Seo Min-ki
2000 (36th)	Song Kang-ho	The Foul King	반칙왕	Im Dae-ho
2000 (36th)	Lee Jung-jae	The Uprising	이재수의 난	Lee Jae-su
2001 (37th)	Choi Min-soo ‡	Libera Me	리베라 메	Jo Sang-woo
2001 (37th)	Song Kang-ho	Joint Security Area	공동경비구역 JSA	Sgt. Oh Kyeong-pil
2001 (37th)	Lee Byung-hun	Bungee Jumping of Their Own	번지점프를 하다	Seo In-woo
2002 (38th)	Cho Jae-hyun ‡	Bad Guy	나쁜 남자	Han-gi
2002 (38th)	Sul Kyung-gu	Public Enemy	공공의 적	Kang Chul-joong
2002 (38th)	Choi Min-sik	Failan	파이란	Lee Kang-jae
2002 (38th)	Yu Oh-seong	Friend	친구	Lee Joon-seok
2003 (39th)	Cha Seung-won ‡	Jail Breakers	광복절 특사	Choi Mu-seok
2003 (39th)	Sul Kyung-gu	Oasis	오아시스	Hong Jong-du
2003 (39th)	Yoo Dong-geun	Marrying the Mafia	가문의 영광	Jang In-tae
2003 (39th)	Shin Hyun-joon	Blue	블루	Kim Jun
2004 (40th)	Choi Min-sik ‡	Oldboy	올드보이	Oh Dae-su
2004 (40th)	Sul Kyung-gu	Silmido	실미도	Kang In-chan
2004 (40th)	Jang Dong-gun	Taegukgi	태극기 휘날리며	Lee Jin-tae
2004 (40th)	Kwon Sang-woo	Once Upon a Time in High School	말죽거리 잔혹사	Kim Hyun-soo
2005 (41st)	Cho Seung-woo ‡	Marathon	말아톤	Yoon Cho-won
2005 (41st)	Baek Yoon-sik	The President's Last Bang	그때 그사람들	Kim Jae-gyu
2005 (41st)	Han Suk-kyu	The President's Last Bang	그때 그사람들	Agent Joo
2006 (42nd)	Lee Byung-hun ‡	A Bittersweet Life	달콤한 인생	Kim Sun-woo
2006 (42nd)	Cha Seung-won	Blood Rain	혈의 누	Wonkyu
2006 (42nd)	Hwang Jung-min	You Are My Sunshine	너는 내 운명	Kim Seok-joong
2006 (42nd)	Jung Jin-young	The King and the Clown	왕의 남자	Yeonsangun of Joseon
2006 (42nd)	Park Hae-il	Rules of Dating	연애의 목적	Lee Yu-rim
2007 (43rd)	Ryoo Seung-bum ‡	Bloody Tie	사생결단	Oh Sang-do
2007 (43rd)	Byun Hee-bong	The Host	괴물	Park Hee-bong
2007 (43rd)	Zo In-sung	A Dirty Carnival	비열한 거리	Kim Byung-doo
2007 (43rd)	Cho Seung-woo	Tazza: The High Rollers	타짜	Kim Goni
2007 (43rd)	Gang Dong-won	Maundy Thursday	우리들의 행복한 시간	Jung Yun-soo
2008 (44th)	Im Chang-jung ‡	Scout	스카우트	Lee Ho-chang
2008 (44th)	Byun Hee-bong	The Devil's Game	더 게임	Kang No-sik
2008 (44th)	Ha Jung-woo	The Chaser	추격자	Ji Yeong-min
2008 (44th)	Kim Yoon-seok	The Chaser	추격자	Eom Joong-ho
2008 (44th)	Song Kang-ho	The Show Must Go On	우아한 세계	Kang In-gu
2009 (45th)	Joo Jin-mo ‡	A Frozen Flower	쌍화점	Gongmin of Goryeo
2009 (45th)	Ha Jung-woo	My Dear Enemy	멋진 하루	Cho Byung-woon
2009 (45th)	Kim Joo-hyuk	My Wife Got Married	아내가 결혼했다	Noh Deok-hoon
2009 (45th)	Sul Kyung-gu	Public Enemy Returns	강철중: 공공의 적 1-1	Kang Chul-joong
2009 (45th)	Song Kang-ho	The Good, the Bad, the Weird	좋은 놈, 나쁜 놈, 이상한 놈	Yoon Tae-goo, the Weird

=== 2010s ===
Year	Winner	Film	Original title	Role(s)
2010 (46th)	Ha Jung-woo ‡	Take Off	국가대표	Cha Heon-tae / Bob
2010 (46th)	Jung Jae-young	Castaway on the Moon	김씨 표류기	Kim Seong-geun
2010 (46th)	Gang Dong-won	Secret Reunion	의형제	Song Ji-won
2010 (46th)	Kim Yoon-seok	Running Turtle	거북이 달린다	Jo Pil-seong
2010 (46th)	Won Bin	Mother	마더	Yoon Do-joon
2011 (47th)	Ha Jung-woo ‡	The Yellow Sea	황해	Kim Gu-nam
2011 (47th)	Cha Tae-hyun	Hello Ghost	헬로우 고스트	Kang Sang-man
2011 (47th)	Lee Byung-hun	I Saw the Devil	악마를 보았다	Kim Soo-hyeon
2011 (47th)	Ryoo Seung-bum	The Unjust	부당거래	Joo Yang
2011 (47th)	Won Bin	The Man from Nowhere	아저씨	Cha Tae-sik
2012 (48th)	Ahn Sung-ki ‡	Unbowed	부러진 화살	Kim Kyung-ho
2012 (48th)	Choi Min-sik	Nameless Gangster: Rules of the Time	범죄와의 전쟁: 나쁜놈들 전성시대	Choi Ik-hyun
2012 (48th)	Gong Yoo	Silenced	도가니	Kang In-ho
2012 (48th)	Kim Yoon-seok	Punch	완득이	Lee Dong-ju
2012 (48th)	Park Hae-il	War of the Arrows	최종병기 활	Choi Nam-yi
2013 (49th)	Ha Jung-woo ‡	The Berlin File	베를린	Pyo Jong-seong
2013 (49th)	Hwang Jung-min	New World	신세계	Jung Chung
2013 (49th)	Lee Byung-hun	Masquerade	광해: 왕이 된 남자	Gwanghaegun of Joseon / Ha-sun
2013 (49th)	Ryu Seung-ryong	Miracle in Cell No. 7	7번방의 선물	Lee Yong-gu
2013 (49th)	Song Joong-ki	A Werewolf Boy	늑대소년	Chul-soo
2014 (50th)	Sul Kyung-gu ‡	Hope	소원	Im Dong-hoon
2014 (50th)	Ha Jung-woo	The Terror Live	더 테러 라이브	Yoon Young-hwa
2014 (50th)	Jung Woo-sung	Cold Eyes	감시자들	James
2014 (50th)	Son Hyun-joo	Hide and Seek	숨바꼭질	Baek Sung-soo
2014 (50th)	Song Kang-ho	The Attorney	변호인	Song Woo-suk
2015 (51st)	Lee Sun-kyun ‡	A Hard Day	끝까지 간다	Ko Gun-su
2015 (51st)	Cho Jin-woong ‡	A Hard Day	끝까지 간다	Park Chang-min
2015 (51st)	Ahn Sung-ki	Revivre	화장	Mr. Oh
2015 (51st)	Choi Min-sik	The Admiral: Roaring Currents	명량	Yi Sun-sin
2015 (51st)	Sul Kyung-gu	My Dictator	나의 독재자	Kim Sung-geun
2016 (52nd)	Lee Byung-hun ‡	Inside Men	내부자들	Ahn Sang-goo
2016 (52nd)	Baek Yoon-sik	Inside Men	내부자들	Lee Kang-hee
2016 (52nd)	Hwang Jung-min	Veteran	베테랑	Seo Do-cheol
2016 (52nd)	Song Kang-ho	The Throne	사도	Yeongjo of Joseon
2016 (52nd)	Yoo Ah-in	The Throne	사도	Crown Prince Sado
2017 (53rd)	Song Kang-ho ‡	The Age of Shadows	밀정	Lee Jung-chool
2017 (53rd)	Kwak Do-won	The Wailing	곡성	Jeon Jong-goo
2017 (53rd)	Yoo Hae-jin	Luck Key	럭키	Choi Hyung-wook
2017 (53rd)	Lee Byung-hun	Master	마스터	Jin Hyun-pil
2017 (53rd)	Ha Jung-woo	Tunnel	터널	Lee Jung-soo
2018 (54th)	Kim Yoon-seok ‡	1987: When the Day Comes	1987	Park Cheo-won
2018 (54th)	Ma Dong-seok	The Outlaws	범죄도시	Ma Seok-do
2018 (54th)	Sul Kyung-gu	The Merciless	불한당: 나쁜 놈들의 세상	Han Jae-ho
2018 (54th)	Song Kang-ho	A Taxi Driver	택시운전사	Kim Man-seob
2018 (54th)	Jung Woo-sung	Steel Rain	강철비	Eom Chul-woo
2019 (55th)	Lee Sung-min ‡	The Spy Gone North	공작	Ri Myung-woon
2019 (55th)	Ryu Seung-ryong	Extreme Job	극한직업	Squad chief Go
2019 (55th)	Yoo Ah-in	Burning	버닝	Lee Jong-su
2019 (55th)	Jung Woo-sung	Innocent Witness	증인	Yang Soon-ho
2019 (55th)	Ju Ji-hoon	Dark Figure of Crime	암수살인	Kang Tae-oh

=== 2020s ===
Year	Winner	Film	Original title	Role(s)
2020 (56th)	Lee Byung-hun ‡	The Man Standing Next	남산의 부장들	Kim Gyu-pyeong
2020 (56th)	Song Kang-ho	Parasite	기생충	Kim Ki-taek
2020 (56th)	Lee Je-hoon	Time to Hunt	사냥의 시간	Jun-seok
2020 (56th)	Jo Jung-suk	Exit	엑시트	Lee Yong-nam
2020 (56th)	Han Suk-kyu	Forbidden Dream	천문: 하늘에 묻는다	Sejong the Great
2021 (57th)	Yoo Ah-in ‡	Voice of Silence	소리도 없이	Tae-in
2021 (57th)	Byun Yo-han	The Book of Fish	자산어보	Jang Chang-dae
2021 (57th)	Sul Kyung-gu	The Book of Fish	자산어보	Jeong Yak-jeon
2021 (57th)	Lee Jung-jae	Deliver Us from Evil	다만 악에서 구하소서	Ray
2021 (57th)	Cho Jin-woong	Me and Me	사라진 시간	Park Hyung-goo
2022 (58th)	Sul Kyung-gu ‡	Kingmaker	킹메이커	Kim Woon-beom
2022 (58th)	Kim Yoon-seok	Escape from Mogadishu	모가디슈	Han Sin-seong
2022 (58th)	Lee Sun-kyun	Kingmaker	킹메이커	Seo Chang-dae
2022 (58th)	Jung Woo	Hot Blooded	뜨거운 피	Park Hee-soo
2022 (58th)	Choi Min-sik	In Our Prime	이상한 나라의 수학자	Lee Hak-sung
2023 (59th)	Ryu Jun-yeol ‡	The Night Owl	올빼미	Cheon Kyung-soo
2023 (59th)	Ma Dong-seok	The Roundup	범죄도시2	Ma Seok-do
2023 (59th)	Park Hae-il	Decision to Leave	헤어질 결심	Jang Hae-jun
2023 (59th)	Song Kang-ho	Broker	브로커	Ha Sang-hyeon
2023 (59th)	Jung Woo-sung	Hunt	헌트	Kim Jung-do
2024 (60th)	Hwang Jung-min ‡	12.12: The Day	서울의 봄	Chun Doo-gwang
2024 (60th)	Kim Yoon-seok	Noryang: Deadly Sea	노량: 죽음의 바다	Yi Sun-sin
2024 (60th)	Lee Byung-hun	Concrete Utopia	콘크리트 유토피아	Yeong-tak
2024 (60th)	Jung Woo-sung	12.12: The Day	서울의 봄	Lee Tae-shin
2024 (60th)	Choi Min-sik	Exhuma	파묘	Kim Sang-deok
2025 (61st)	Jo Jung-suk ‡	Pilot	파일럿	Han Jung-woo
2025 (61st)	Yoon Joo-sang	The Land of Morning Calm	아침바다 갈매기는	Yeong-guk
2025 (61st)	Lee Byung-hun	The Match	승부	Cho Hun-hyun
2025 (61st)	Lee Hee-joon	Handsome Guys	핸섬가이즈	Park Sang-goo
2025 (61st)	Hyun Bin	Harbin	하얼빈	An Jung-geun
2026 (62nd)	Park Jeong-min ‡	The Ugly	얼굴	Lim Dong-hwan
2026 (62nd)	Koo Kyo-hwan	Once We Were Us	만약에 우리	Lee Eun-ho
2026 (62nd)	Yoo Hae-jin	The King's Warden	왕과 사는 남자	Eom Heung-do
2026 (62nd)	Lee Byung-hun	No Other Choice	어쩔수가없다	Yoo Man-su
2026 (62nd)	Hong Kyung	Good News	굿뉴스	Seo Go-myung

== Multiple awards and nominations ==
The following individuals received two or more Best Actor awards:

Wins	Actor
8	Ahn Sung-ki
4	Kim Jin-kyu
3	Ha Jung-woo
3	Lee Byung-hun
3	Park Joong-hoon
2	Choi Min-sik
2	Lee Geung-young
2	Sul Kyung-gu

The following individuals received four or more Best Actor nominations:

Nominations	Actor
13	Ahn Sung-ki
10	Song Kang-ho
10	Lee Byung-hun
9	Sul Kyung-gu
8	Choi Min-sik
7	Ha Jung-woo
6	Han Suk-kyu
6	Kim Yoon-seok
5	Jung Woo-sung
5	Park Joong-hoon
4	Choi Min-soo
4	Hwang Jung-min
4	Kim Jin-kyu
4	Moon Sung-keun

== Sources ==
- "Baeksang Arts Awards Nominees and Winners Lists". Naver Movie (in Korean).
- "Baeksang Arts Awards Winners Lists". Baeksang Arts Awards (in Korean).
