= Blue Dragon Film Award for Best Actor =

Annual film award in South Korea

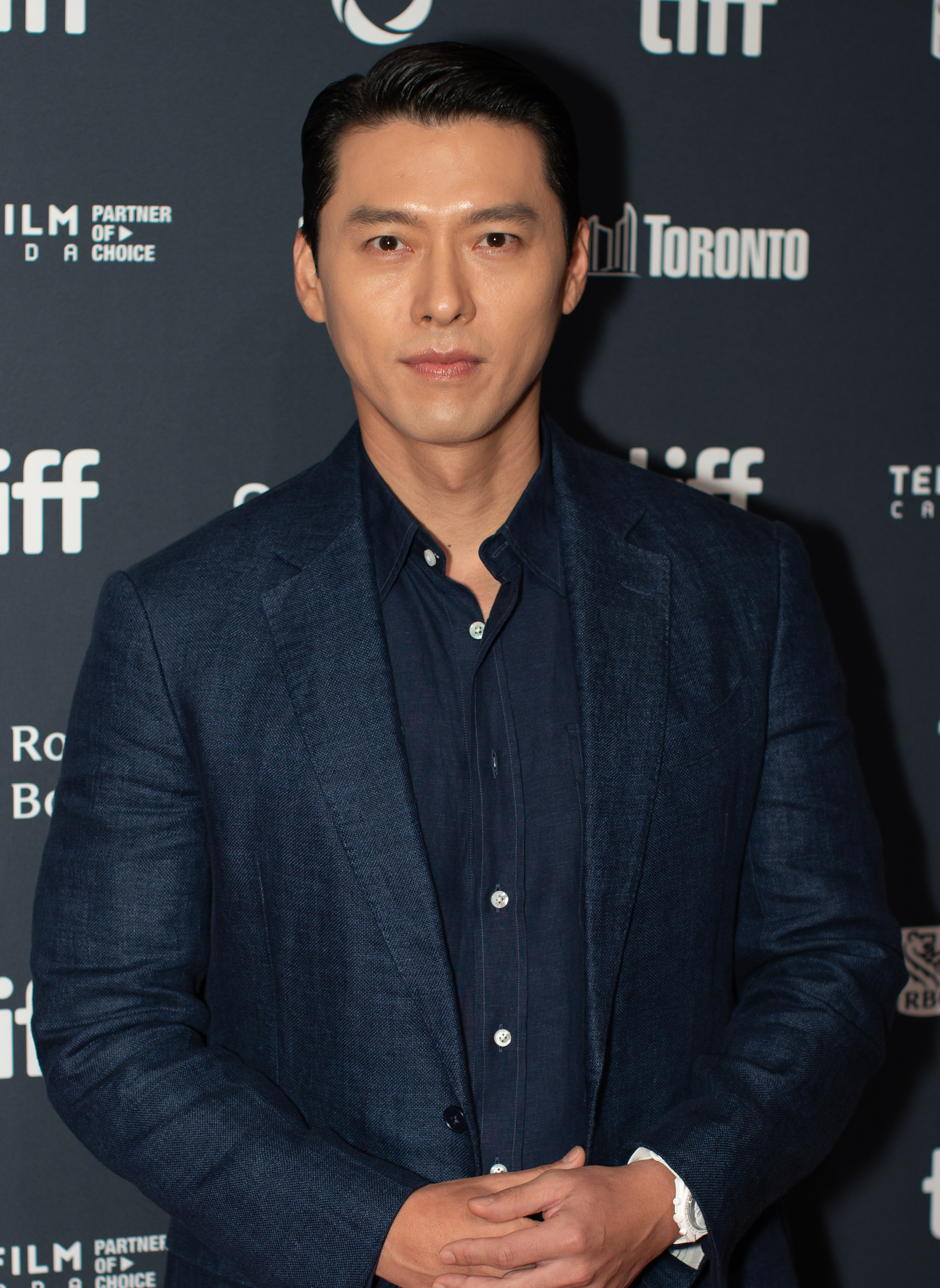
- The 2025 recipient: Hyun Bin
- Awarded for: Best Actor
- Country: South Korea
- Presented by: Blue Dragon Film Awards
- First award: 1963
- Currently held by: Hyun Bin
- Website: blueaward.co.kr

The Blue Dragon Film Award for Best Actor is one of the awards that is presented annually at the Blue Dragon Film Awards by Sports Chosun, which is typically held at the end of the year.

== Winners and nominees ==
Table key
‡	Indicates the winner

=== 1960s ===
Year	Winner	Film	Original title	Role(s)
1963 (1st)	Kim Seung-ho ‡	Kinship	혈맥	Kim Deok-sam
1964 (2nd)	Kim Jin-kyu ‡	Extra Human Being	잉여인간	Seo Man-ki
1965 (3rd)	Choi Moo-ryong ‡	The North and South	남과 북	
1966 (4th)	Shin Young-kyun ‡	Market	시장	Do-myeong
1967 (5th)	Kim Seung-ho ‡	Full Ship	만선	
1969 (6th)	Shin Young-kyun ‡	Prince Daewon	대원군	Heungseon Daewongun

=== 1970s ===
Year	Winner	Film	Original title	Role(s)
1970 (7th)	Park No-sik ‡	A Returned Man of Korea	돌아온 팔도사나이	
1971 (8th)	Choi Moo-ryong ‡	A Bout in 30 Years	30년 만의 대결	Jang Dae-gyu
1972 (9th)	Park No-sik ‡	A Cattle Seller	소장수	Man-seok
1973 (10th)	Shin Young-kyun ‡	The Three-Day Reign	삼일천하	Kim Okkyun

=== 1990s ===
Year	Winner	Film	Original title	Role(s)
1990 (11th)	Ahn Sung-ki ‡	North Korean Partisans in South Korea	남부군	Lee Tae
1990 (11th)	Park Sang-min	General's Son	장군의 아들	Kim Du-han
1990 (11th)	Moon Sung-keun	Black Republic	그들도 우리처럼	Kim Gi‑yeong / Han Tae-hoon
1990 (11th)	Lee Young-ha	Because You Are a Woman	단지 그대가 여자라는 이유만으로	Seung-chil
1990 (11th)	Kim In-mun	Rooster	수탉	Do-chil
1991 (12th)	Im Sung-min ‡	Death Song	사의 찬미	Kim Woo-jin
1991 (12th)	Ahn Sung-ki	Who Saw the Dragon's Toenail?	누가 용의 발톱을 보았는가	Choi Jong-su
1991 (12th)	Lee Deok-hwa	Fly High Run Far	개벽	Hae-weol, Choe Si-hyeong
1991 (12th)	Jeong Bo-seok	Portrait of the Days of Youth	젊은날의 초상	Lee Young-hoon
1991 (12th)	Choi Min-soo	For Agnes	아그네스를 위하여	Hwang Mi-ho
1992 (13th)	Moon Sung-keun ‡	Road to the Racetrack	경마장 가는 길	R
1992 (13th)	Ahn Sung-ki	White Badge	하얀전쟁	Han Ki-ju
1992 (13th)	Lee Geung-young	White Badge	하얀전쟁	Pyon Chin-su
1992 (13th)	Yu In-chon	Kim's War	김의 전쟁	Kwon Hee-ro
1992 (13th)	Choi Min-soo	Marriage Story	결혼 이야기	Kim Tae‑kyu
1993 (14th)	Kim Myung-gon ‡	Sopyonje	서편제	Yu-bong
1993 (14th)	Moon Sung-keun	The 101st Proposition	101번째 프로포즈	Ku Yeong-seop
1993 (14th)	Ahn Sung-ki	Blue In You	그대 안의 블루	Lee Ho-suk
1993 (14th)	Lee Geung-young	That Woman, That Man	그 여자, 그 남자	Chang
1993 (14th)	Lee Deok-hwa	I Will Survive	살어리랏다	Man-seok
1994 (15th)	Moon Sung-keun ‡	To You from Me	너에게 나를 보낸다	"I"
1994 (15th)	Park Joong-hoon ‡	Rules of the Game	게임의 법칙	Lee Yong-de
1994 (15th)	Ahn Sung-ki	Two Cops	투캅스	Detective Jo
1994 (15th)	Lee Geung-young	Out to the World	세상 밖으로	Geung-young
1994 (15th)	Dokgo Young-jae	Life of Hollywood Kid	헐리우드 키드의 생애	Yoon Myeong-gil
1995 (16th)	Choi Min-soo ‡	Terrorist	닥터 봉	Oh Soo-hyun
1995 (16th)	Park Joong-hoon	How to Top My Wife	마누라 죽이기	Park Bong-soo
1995 (16th)	Ahn Sung-ki	The Hair Dresser	헤어 드레서	Henri Park
1995 (16th)	Han Suk-kyu	Dr. Bong	닥터 봉	Bong Joon-soo
1995 (16th)	Hong Kyeong-in	A Single Spark	아름다운 청년 전태일	Jeon Tae-il
1996 (17th)	Moon Sung-keun ‡	A Petal	꽃잎	Jang
1996 (17th)	Kim Min-jong	The Gate of Destiny	귀천도	Woo Eun-keom
1996 (17th)	Park Joong-hoon	Two Cops 2	투캅스 2	Detective Kang Min-ho
1996 (17th)	Ahn Sung-ki	The Adventures Of Mrs. Park	박봉곤 가출 사건	Mr. X
1996 (17th)	Han Suk-kyu	The Gingko Bed	은행나무 침대	Soo-hyeon / Jong-moon
1997 (18th)	Han Suk-kyu ‡	Green Fish	초록물고기	Kim Mak-dong
1997 (18th)	Kim Seung-woo	Ghost Mamma	고스트 맘마	Yoon Ji-seok
1997 (18th)	Jung Woo-sung	Beat	비트	Lee Min
1997 (18th)	Park Shin-yang	Motel Cactus	모텔 선인장	Kim Suk-tae
1997 (18th)	Park Joong-hoon	Final Blow	깡패 수업	Hwang Seong-chul
1998 (19th)	Park Shin-yang ‡	A Promise	약속	Gong Sang-du
1998 (19th)	Kim Seung-woo	Scent Of A Man	남자의 향기	Kwan Hyuk‑su
1998 (19th)	Ahn Sung-ki	Bedroom And Courtroom	생과부 위자료 청구 소송	Myeong Seong-ki
1998 (19th)	Lee Jung-jae	An Affair	정사	Woo-in
1998 (19th)	Han Suk-kyu	Christmas in August	8월의 크리스마스	Yu Jung-won
1999 (20th)	Lee Jung-jae ‡	City of the Rising Sun	태양은 없다	Cho Hong-ki
1999 (20th)	Park Joong-hoon	Nowhere to Hide	인정사정 볼 것 없다	Detective Woo Young-min
1999 (20th)	Choi Min-soo	Phantom, The Submarine	유령	202 / Captain
1999 (20th)	Choi Min-sik	Shiri	쉬리	Park Mu-young
1999 (20th)	Han Suk-kyu	Tell Me Something	텔 미 썸딩	Detective Jo

=== 2000s ===
Year	Winner and nominees	Film	Original title	Role(s)
2000 (21st)	Sul Kyung-gu ‡	Peppermint Candy	박하사탕	Kim Yong-ho
2000 (21st)	Song Kang-ho	Joint Security Area	공동경비구역 JSA	Sgt. Oh Kyeong-pil
2000 (21st)	Shin Hyun-joon	Bichunmoo	비천무	Yu Jinha
2000 (21st)	Yoo Ji-tae	Ditto	동감	Ji In
2001 (22nd)	Choi Min-sik ‡	Failan	소름	Lee Kang-jae
2001 (22nd)	Yu Oh-seong	Friend	친구	Lee Joon-seok
2001 (22nd)	Jang Dong-gun	Friend	친구	Han Dong-su
2001 (22nd)	Yoo Ji-tae	One Fine Spring Day	봄날은 간다	Sang-woo
2001 (22nd)	Lee Byung-hun	Bungee Jumping of Their Own	번지 점프를 하다	Seo In-woo
2001 (22nd)	Cha Seung-won	Kick the Moon	신라의 달밤	Choi Gi-dong
2002 (23rd)	Sul Kyung-gu ‡	Public Enemy	공공의 적	Kang Chul-joong
2002 (23rd)	Song Kang-ho	Sympathy for Mr. Vengeance	복수는 나의 것	Park Dong-jin
2002 (23rd)	Lee Byung-hun	Addicted	중독	Hwang Dae-jin
2002 (23rd)	Jang Dong-gun	The Coast Guard	해안선	Private Kang
2002 (23rd)	Choi Min-sik	Chi-hwa-seon	취화선	Jang Seung-up
2002 (23rd)	Kim Seung-woo	Break Out	라이터를 켜라	Heo Bong-gu
2003 (24th)	Choi Min-sik ‡	Oldboy	올드보이	Oh Dae-su
2003 (24th)	Park Joong-hoon	Once Upon a Time in a Battlefield	황산벌	Gyebaek
2003 (24th)	Song Kang-ho	Memories of Murder	살인의 추억	Detective Park Doo-man
2003 (24th)	Jung Woo-sung	Mutt Boy	똥개	Cha Cheol-min
2003 (24th)	Cha Seung-won	My Teacher, Mr. Kim	선생 김봉두	Kim Bong-doo
2004 (25th)	Jang Dong-gun ‡	Taegukgi	태극기 휘날리며	Lee Jin-tae
2004 (25th)	Park Shin-yang	The Big Swindle	범죄의 재구성	Choi Chang-hyeok / Choi Chang-ho
2004 (25th)	Song Kang-ho	The President's Barber	효자동 이발사	Seong Han-mo
2004 (25th)	Choi Min-sik	Springtime	꽃피는 봄이 오면	Lee Hyun-woo
2004 (25th)	Han Suk-kyu	The Scarlet Letter	주홍글씨	Lee Ki-hoon
2005 (26th)	Hwang Jung-min ‡	You Are My Sunshine	너는 내 운명	Kim Seok-joong
2005 (26th)	Cho Seung-woo	Marathon	말아톤	Yoon Cho-won
2005 (26th)	Lee Byung-hun	A Bittersweet Life	달콤한 인생	Kim Sun-woo
2005 (26th)	Park Hae-il	Rules of Dating	연애의 목적	Lee Yoo-rim
2005 (26th)	Ryoo Seung-bum	Crying Fist	주먹이 운다	Yu Sang-hwan
2006 (27th)	Park Joong-hoon ‡	Radio Star	라디오 스타	Choi Gon
2006 (27th)	Ahn Sung-ki ‡	Radio Star	라디오 스타	Park Min-soo
2006 (27th)	Jo In-sung	A Dirty Carnival	비열한 거리	Kim Byung-doo
2006 (27th)	Cho Seung-woo	Tazza: The High Rollers	타짜	Kim Goni
2006 (27th)	Kam Woo-sung	King and the Clown	왕의 남자	Jang-saeng
2006 (27th)	Song Kang-ho	The Host	괴물	Park Gang-du
2007 (28th)	Song Kang-ho ‡	The Show Must Go On	우아한 세계	Kang In-gu
2007 (28th)	Hwang Jung-min	Happiness	행복	Young-soo
2007 (28th)	Joo Jin-mo	A Love	사랑	In-ho
2007 (28th)	Kim Sang-kyung	May 18	화려한 휴가	Kang Min-woo
2007 (28th)	Sul Kyung-gu	Voice of a Murderer	그놈 목소리	Han Kyung-bae
2008 (29th)	Kim Yoon-seok ‡	The Chaser	추격자	Eom Joong-ho
2008 (29th)	Ha Jung-woo	The Chaser	추격자	Je Yeong-min
2008 (29th)	Kim Joo-hyuk	My Wife Got Married	아내가 결혼했다	Noh Deok-hoon
2008 (29th)	Lee Byung-hun	The Good, the Bad, the Weird	좋은 놈, 나쁜 놈, 이상한 놈	Park Chang-yi, the Bad
2008 (29th)	Song Kang-ho	The Good, the Bad, the Weird	좋은 놈, 나쁜 놈, 이상한 놈	Yun Tae-goo / The Weird
2008 (29th)	Sul Kyung-gu	Public Enemy Returns	강철중: 공공의 적 1-1	Kang Chul-joong
2009 (30th)	Kim Myung-min ‡	Closer to Heaven	내 사랑 내 곁에	Baek Jong-woo
2009 (30th)	Ha Jung-woo	Take Off	국가대표	Cha Heon-tae / Bob
2009 (30th)	Jang Dong-gun	Good Morning President	굿모닝 프레지던트	Cha Ji-wook
2009 (30th)	Kim Yoon-seok	Running Turtle	거북이 달린다	Jo Pil-seong
2009 (30th)	Song Kang-ho	Thirst	박쥐	Sang-hyun

=== 2010s ===
Year	Winner and nominees	Film	Original title	Role(s)
2010 (31st)	Jung Jae-young ‡	Moss	이끼	Cheon Yong-deok
2010 (31st)	Gang Dong-won	Secret Reunion	의형제	Song Ji-won
2010 (31st)	Lee Byung-hun	I Saw the Devil	악마를 보았다	Kim Soo-hyeon
2010 (31st)	Park Hee-soon	Barefoot Dream	맨발의 꿈	Kim Won-kang
2010 (31st)	Won Bin	The Man from Nowhere	아저씨	Cha Tae-sik
2011 (32nd)	Park Hae-il ‡	War of the Arrows	최종병기 활	Choi Nam-yi
2011 (32nd)	Go Soo	The Front Line	고지전	Kim Soo-hyeok
2011 (32nd)	Gong Yoo	Silenced	도가니	Kang In-ho
2011 (32nd)	Kim Yoon-seok	The Yellow Sea	황해	Myun Jung-hak
2011 (32nd)	Yoon Kye-sang	Poongsan	풍산개	Poongsan
2012 (33rd)	Choi Min-sik ‡	Nameless Gangster: Rules of the Time	범죄와의 전쟁	Choi Ik-hyun
2012 (33rd)	Ahn Sung-ki	Unbowed	부러진 화살	Kim Kyung-ho
2012 (33rd)	Ha Jung-woo	Nameless Gangster: Rules of the Time	범죄와의 전쟁	Choi Hyung-bae
2012 (33rd)	Kim Yoon-seok	Punch	완득이	Lee Dong-ju
2012 (33rd)	Lee Byung-hun	Masquerade	광해: 왕이 된 남자	King Gwanghae / Ha-sun
2013 (34th)	Hwang Jung-min ‡	New World	신세계	Jung Chung
2013 (34th)	Ha Jung-woo	The Terror Live	더 테러 라이브	Yoon Young-hwa
2013 (34th)	Ryu Seung-ryong	Miracle in Cell No. 7	7번방의 선물	Lee Yong-gu
2013 (34th)	Sul Kyung-gu	Hope	소원	Im Dong-hoon
2013 (34th)	Song Kang-ho	The Face Reader	관상	Kim Nae-gyeong
2014 (35th)	Song Kang-ho ‡	The Attorney	변호인	Song Wu-seok
2014 (35th)	Choi Min-sik	The Admiral: Roaring Currents	명량	Admiral Yi Sun-shin
2014 (35th)	Jung Woo-sung	The Divine Move	신의 한 수	Tae-seok
2014 (35th)	Lee Sun-kyun	A Hard Day	끝까지 간다	Ko Gun-su
2014 (35th)	Park Hae-il	Whistle Blower	제보자	Yoon Min-cheol
2015 (36th)	Yoo Ah-in ‡	The Throne	사도	Crown Prince Sado
2015 (36th)	Hwang Jung-min	Veteran	베테랑	Seo Do-cheol
2015 (36th)	Jung Jae-young	Right Now, Wrong Then	지금은맞고그때는틀리다	Ham Chun-su
2015 (36th)	Lee Jung-jae	Assassination	암살	Yem Sek-jin
2015 (36th)	Song Kang-ho	The Throne	사도	King Yeongjo
2016 (37th)	Lee Byung-hun ‡	Inside Men	내부자들	Ahn Sang-goo
2016 (37th)	Ha Jung-woo	The Tunnel	터널	Lee Jung-soo
2016 (37th)	Jung Woo-sung	Asura: The City of Madness	아수라	Han Do-kyung
2016 (37th)	Kwak Do-won	The Wailing	곡성	Jeon Jong-goo
2016 (37th)	Song Kang-ho	The Age of Shadows	밀정	Lee Jung-chool
2017 (38th)	Song Kang-ho ‡	A Taxi Driver	택시 운전사	Kim Man-seob
2017 (38th)	Jo In-sung	The King	더 킹	Park Tae-soo
2017 (38th)	Kim Yoon-seok	The Fortress	남한산성	Kim Sang-heon
2017 (38th)	Lee Byung-hun	The Fortress	남한산성	Choi Myung-kil
2017 (38th)	Sul Kyung-gu	The Merciless	불한당: 나쁜 놈들의 세상	Han Jae-ho
2018 (39th)	Kim Yoon-seok ‡	1987: When the Day Comes	1987	Park Cheo-won
2018 (39th)	Ha Jung-woo	Along with the Gods: The Two Worlds	신과 함께: 죄와 벌	Gang-rim
2018 (39th)	Ju Ji-hoon	Dark Figure of Crime	암수살인	Kang Tae-oh
2018 (39th)	Lee Sung-min	The Spy Gone North	공작	Ri Myung-woon
2018 (39th)	Yoo Ah-in	Burning	버닝	Lee Jong-su
2019 (40th)	Jung Woo-sung ‡	Innocent Witness	증인	Yang Soon-ho
2019 (40th)	Ryu Seung-ryong	Extreme Job	극한직업	Squad Chief Go
2019 (40th)	Sul Kyung-gu	Birthday	생일	Jung Jung-il
2019 (40th)	Song Kang-ho	Parasite	기생충	Kim Ki-taek
2019 (40th)	Jo Jung-suk	Exit	엑시트	Lee Yong-nam

=== 2020s ===
Year	Winner and nominees	Film	Original title	Role(s)
2020 (41st)	Yoo Ah-in ‡	Voice of Silence	소리도 없이	Tae-in
2020 (41st)	Lee Byung-hun	The Man Standing Next	남산의 부장들	Kim Gyu-pyeong
2020 (41st)	Lee Jung-jae	Deliver Us from Evil	다만 악에서 구하소서	Ray
2020 (41st)	Hwang Jung-min	Deliver Us from Evil	다만 악에서 구하소서	Kim In-nam
2020 (41st)	Jung Woo-sung	Steel Rain 2: Summit	강철비2: 정상회담	President Han Kyeong-jae
2021 (42nd)	Sul Kyung-gu‡	The Book of Fish	자산어보	Jeong Yak-jeon
2021 (42nd)	Byun Yo-han	The Book of Fish	자산어보	Jang Chang-dae
2021 (42nd)	Kim Yun-seok	Escape from Mogadishu	모가디슈	Han Sin-seong
2021 (42nd)	Jo In-sung	Escape from Mogadishu	모가디슈	Kang Dae-jin
2021 (42nd)	Song Joong-ki	Space Sweepers	승리호	Kim Tae-ho
2022 (43rd)	Park Hae-il‡	Decision to Leave	헤어질 결심	Jang Hae-jun
2022 (43rd)	Sul Kyung-gu	Kingmaker	킹메이커	Kim Woon-beom
2022 (43rd)	Song Kang-ho	Broker	브로커	Ha Sang-hyeon
2022 (43rd)	Jung Woo-sung	Hunt	헌트	Kim Jung-do
2022 (43rd)	Lee Byung-hun	Emergency Declaration	비상선언	Park Jae-hyuk
2023 (44th)
2023 (44th)	Lee Byung-hun ‡	Concrete Utopia	콘크리트 유토피아	Yeong-tak
2023 (44th)	Doh Kyung-soo	The Moon	더 문	Hwang Sun-woo
2023 (44th)	Ryu Jun-yeol	The Night Owl	올빼미	Cheon Kyung-soo
2023 (44th)	Yoo Hae-jin	Honey Sweet	달짝지근해: 7510	Cha Chi-ho
2023 (44th)	Song Kang-ho	Cobweb	거미집	Kim-yeol
2024 (45th)
2024 (45th)	Hwang Jung-min ‡	12.12: The Day	서울의 봄	Chun Doo-gwang
2024 (45th)	Lee Sung-min	Handsome Guys	핸섬가이즈	Kang Jae-pil
2024 (45th)	Lee Je-hoon	Escape	탈주	Lim Gyu-nam
2024 (45th)	Jung Woo-sung	12.12: The Day	서울의 봄	Lee Tae-shin
2024 (45th)	Choi Min-sik	Exhuma	파묘	Kim Sang-deok
2025 (46th)
2025 (46th)	Hyun Bin ‡	Harbin	하얼빈	An Jung-geun
2025 (46th)	Park Jeong-min	The Ugly	얼굴	Lim Dong-hwan / young Lim Yeong-gyu
2025 (46th)	Sul Kyung-gu	A Normal Family	보통의 가족	Yang Jae-wan
2025 (46th)	Lee Byung-hun	No Other Choice	어쩔수가없다	Yoo Man-soo
2025 (46th)	Jo Jung-suk	My Daughter is a Zombie	좀비딸	Lee Jung-hwan

== Multiple wins and nominations ==
The following individuals received two or more Best Actor awards:

Wins	Actor
3	Choi Min-sik
3	Hwang Jung-min
3	Moon Sung-keun
3	Shin Young-kyun
3	Song Kang-ho
3	Sul Kyung-gu
2	Ahn Sung-ki
2	Choi Moo-ryong
2	Kim Yoon-seok
2	Kim Seung-ho
2	Lee Byung-hun
2	Park Joong-hoon
2	Park No-sik
2	Yoo Ah-in
2	Park Hae-il

The following individuals received four or more Best Actor nominations:

Nominations	Actor
16	Song Kang-ho
12	Lee Byung-hun
11	Sul Kyung-gu
10	Ahn Sung-ki
8	Choi Min-sik
8	Jung Woo-sung
7	Park Joong-hoon
6	Ha Jung-woo
6	Han Suk-kyu
6	Hwang Jung-min
6	Kim Yoon-seok
5	Moon Sung-keun
5	Park Hae-il
4	Lee Jung-jae
4	Zo In-sung

== General references ==
- "Winners and nominees lists". Blue Dragon Film Awards (in Korean). Archived from the original on 27 January 2022.
- "Blue Dragon Film Awards". Naver (in Korean).
