= Radio Star (film) =

- Theatrical release poster
- Directed by: Lee Joon-ik
- Written by: Choi Seok-hwan
- Produced by: Jung Seung-hye; Lee Joon-ik
- Starring: Park Joong-hoon; Ahn Sung-ki
- Cinematography: Na Seung-yong
- Edited by: Kim Sang-bum; Kim Jae-bum
- Music by: Bang Jun-seok
- Distributed by: Cinema Service
- Release date: September 28, 2006
- Running time: 115 minutes
- Country: South Korea
- Language: Korean
- Budget: US$3 million
- Box office: US$9.7 million

Radio Star (Korean: 라디오 스타) is a 2006 South Korean comedy-drama film directed by Lee Joon-ik, starring Park Joong-hoon and Ahn Sung-ki in a story about an aging, has-been rock star who, plagued by debt and run-ins with the law, unwillingly begins working as the DJ of a small radio show in the countryside, with his loyal manager of 20 years in tow.

== Plot ==
Choi Gon had a big hit in 1988 with his song "The Rain and You" and became one of the top stars of the 1980s, but did not handle the fame very well, acquiring bad habits and quickly spending most of his money. In 2006, now past his prime, leather-jacket-and-jeans-wearing Gon resents that the spotlight has moved on to younger entertainers, but he still lives the life of a rock star, getting into drunk driving incidents and drug scandals. The only thing Gon has left is his longtime manager and friend, Park Min-soo, who has stood by him since the peak of his career. Min-soo still manages to find Gon small gigs in little coffee shops on the outskirts of Seoul and continues to look after him and keep him out of trouble, even if that means neglecting his own family.

One day Gon gets in a fight with a customer at a cafe and ends up in jail. Because of Gon's prior record, the bail is set so high that the desperate Min-soo sees no way to deal with it on his own, so he goes to a major radio station to call in old favors. The only thing he turns up is a job as a DJ at a local radio station in a small provincial town in the remote mountainous county of Yeongwol. The radio station itself is on its last legs and is close to shutting down.

Arriving in Yeongwol, nothing seems to suit Gon, despite all the efforts Min-soo makes to make his life there as comfortable as possible. Gon sabotages many things by being pessimistic and negative—even when he is on the air. But to everyone's surprise, his daily show Choi Gon's Midday Songs of Hope becomes a big hit in the small town, as he allows the locals to tell their own eccentric stories. Also, hard rock music, which was initially foreign to the townspeople, becomes the bridge between them and Gon. When his newfound fan club begins to put the recordings of his show on the internet, soon the big bosses in Seoul become aware of Gon's fame and want him to make a comeback—but without his manager.

== Cast ==
- Park Joong-hoon as Choi Gon
- Ahn Sung-ki as Park Min-soo
- Choi Jung-yoon as Kang Seok-young
- Jung Gyu-soo as Bureau chief
- Jung Seok-yong as Sound engineer Park
- Yoon Joo-sang as Director Kim
- No Brain (Lee Seong-woo, Hwang Hyeon-seong, Jeong Jae-hwan, Jeong Min-joon) as members of fictional rock band East River
- Ahn Mi-na (credited as Han Yeo-woon) as Ms. Kim
- Lee Il-seop
- Kim Kwang-sik as Mr. Jang
- Jo Ryeon
- Kang San as Ho-young
- Kim Tan-hyeon as company president Choi
- Son Young-soon as Ho-young's grandmother
- Kim Ji-heon as Ms. Park
- Bae Jang-su
- Kim Hyun-ah as middle-aged woman in Misari
- Lee Jae-gu as head of Wonju Bureau
- Lee Joon-ik as Chinese restaurant cook
- Kang Gwang-won
- Kim Dae-ho
- Choi Cheong-ja
- Hwang In-joon
- Lee Sun-geum
- Oh Seo-won as nurse
- Kim Kyeong-ae as owner of Cheongrok Dabang coffee shop
- Go Seok-dong
- Won Woo
- Shin Young-jae
- Kim Jang-hoon
- Im Baek-chun as principal
- Lee Yeong-seok
- Shin Jung-geun as Misari president Nam
- Jeon Ki-kwang
- Jo Kyung-hoon as man with tough face
- Jeon Dae-byeong

== Production ==
After making Korean cinematic history with his record-breaking hit period film King and the Clown (2005), director Lee Joon-ik wanted his follow-up to be a smaller-scaled, character-driven film. Like King and the Clown, Lee wanted his next film to also be about the lives of outsiders, saying, "I think the tragedy of capitalist society is that so many people endlessly struggle to become part of the mainstream. I want to keep showing that those outside the mainstream of society can also be happy." Screenwriter Choi Seok-hwan brought him a script he had been working on for years; Choi had collaborated with Lee on his previous films King and the Clown and Once Upon a Time in a Battlefield (2003). An early draft revolved around the character of a young, female manager, but Achim Pictures president Jung Seung-hye pointed Lee in a different narrative direction, and the film became a bittersweet dramedy about two older men.

Actor Park Joong-hoon (who once experienced the life of a KBS 2FM DJ in the 1990s) was cast first, and for the role opposite him, Park suggested his real-life longtime friend Ahn Sung-ki, with whom he had starred in three previous films, namely, Chilsu and Mansu (1988), Two Cops (1993) and Nowhere to Hide (1999). Ahn said, "If we did not sustain our 20-year friendship, we could not have done justice to the touching scenes in Radio Star. The film has a cunning resemblance to our ordinary life, and (while we were acting), we felt it firsthand." Park said the project appealed to him because the film industry rarely focused on characters in their forties and fifties (his and Ahn's age), and that as an actor for 21 years, he had had a similar career trajectory to Gon's, "Because we went through similar things in the same period, then it's an analogy that works perfectly. I mean, I've had plenty of ups and downs in my career: repeating the same comedies over and over brought me to a slump, I had to bridge the gap after coming back from the US, I had a little redemption... many things happened over the years." Park added that his friendship with Ahn "has gained depth, we're much more comfortable working together. We've known each other for 20 years, and Choi Gon and Park Min-soo in the film have been together for 20 years. The situation is a little different, but the fundamental relationship between us and the two characters is very similar. Sometimes we feel as if we're shooting a documentary, in a way. But hey, we're happy."

Members of real-life punk rock band No Brain appeared in supporting roles as a fictional band who helps the character Gon find enthusiasm for rock music again. They also contributed their songs to the soundtrack, which is a mix of old pop classics and modern rock.

Radio Star was a co-production between Achim Pictures and Lee's own production shingle Cineworld, was distributed locally by Cinema Service and sold internationally by co-investor CJ Entertainment. It was filmed on location in Yeongwol County, a remote area in the mountainous Gangwon Province. After three months of shooting, the film wrapped on July 8, 2006.

When asked about the film's themes, Lee said, "Before the advent of television, most people including myself learned a lot about life through radio. But these days we depend on visual media. If visual media is regarded as a channel for spreading fully constructed images, then the radio can be seen as one that encourages people to use their imagination. Success does not necessarily mean happiness, nor does failure mean unhappiness. Through this film, people will realize that there's more to life than winning or losing. What's important is that you live a happy life."

== Reception ==
Radio Star was released in theaters on September 28, 2006, during the Chuseok holidays. Despite high expectations and positive reviews from critics, the film made a disappointing debut, drawing 150,684 viewers on its opening weekend. But it earned average ratings of 9.22 out of 10 in a poll of 7,749 netizens by the portal site Naver, and ticket sales surged exponentially over the following weeks, with strong word of mouth ultimately making the movie a success. It drew a total of 1,879,501 admissions, and grossed a decent US$12.5 million.

According to film critic Lee Sang-yong, part of the film's appeal was due to nostalgia, saying, "Radio Star attracted a big audience among middle-aged people who miss the songs of their times."

Park Joong-hoon and Ahn Sung-ki tied for Best Actor at the 2006 Blue Dragon Film Awards, and Ahn also won Best Actor at the 2006 Korean Association of Film Critics Awards and the 2007 Grand Bell Awards. Music director Bang Jun-seok received several nominations for his work on this film, winning Best Music at the 2006 Korean Association of Film Critics Awards and the 2007 Korean Film Awards.

== Original soundtrack ==
1. 비와 당신 (The Rain and You) - Park Joong-hoon
1. 속앓이
2. 영월 가는 길
3. 배려
4. 오래된 방송국
5. 청소
6. 비와 당신 Movie Ver. (The Rain and You) - No Brain
7. 전단지
8. 영월의 밤
9. 시그널
10. 크게 라디오를 켜고 (Turn Up the Volume) - Sinawe
11. 오래된 친구
12. 미인 (Beautiful Woman) - Shin Jung-hyeon
13. 김양의 사연
14. 빗속의 여인 (Woman in the Rain) - Kim Choo-ja
15. 다방의 밤
16. 전화속 사연들
17. 넌 내게 반했어 Movie Ver. (You've Fallen for Me) - No Brain
18. 술오른 밤길
19. 기찻길에서 만난 동강
20. 아름다운 강산 (Beautiful Rivers and Mountains) - No Brain
21. 김밥집
22. 지하철김밥
23. 지울수 없는 너 (You Cannot Be Erased) - U&Me Blue
24. 빛을 받는 별
25. 미안함
26. 그대발길 머무는 곳에 (Wherever You Stay) - Cho Yong-pil
27. 우산속의 우정
28. 비와 당신 Acoustic Ver. (The Rain and You) - Park Joong-hoon
29. 넌 내게 반했어 Original Ver. (You've Fallen for Me) - No Brain

== Awards and nominations ==
Year	Award	Category	Recipient	Result
2006	14th Chunsa Film Art Awards	Special Jury Prize	Park Joong-hoon	Won
2006	27th Blue Dragon Film Awards	Best Film	Radio Star	Nominated
2006	27th Blue Dragon Film Awards	Best Actor	Ahn Sung-ki	Won
2006	27th Blue Dragon Film Awards	Best Actor	Park Joong-hoon	Won
2006	27th Blue Dragon Film Awards	Best New Actress	Choi Jung-yoon	Nominated
2006	27th Blue Dragon Film Awards	Best Music	Bang Jun-seok	Nominated
2006	27th Blue Dragon Film Awards	Best Couple Award	Park Joong-hoon and Ahn Sung-ki	Nominated
2006	26th Korean Association of Film Critics Awards	Best Actor	Ahn Sung-ki	Won
2006	26th Korean Association of Film Critics Awards	Best Music	Bang Jun-seok	Won
2006	7th Women in Film Korea Awards	Woman Filmmaker of the Year	Jung Seung-hye	Won
2007	4th Max Movie Awards	Best Film	Radio Star	Won
2007	43rd Baeksang Arts Awards	Best Film	Radio Star	Nominated
2007	43rd Baeksang Arts Awards	Best New Actress	Choi Jung-yoon	Nominated
2007	44th Grand Bell Awards	Best Film	Radio Star	Nominated
2007	44th Grand Bell Awards	Best Actor	Ahn Sung-ki	Won
2007	44th Grand Bell Awards	Best Music	Bang Jun-seok	Nominated
2007	10th Shanghai International Film Festival	Radio Star	Jin Jue for Best Film	Nominated
2007	6th Korean Film Awards	Best Music	Bang Jun-seok	Won

== Musical theatre adaptation ==
In 2008, the film was adapted into a stage musical. The original run starred Jung Sung-hwa and Seo Beom-seok in the role of Park Min-soo, and Kim Da-hyun as Choi Gon, and was held at the Seoul Arts Center from January 26 to March 2, 2008.

Praised for its "refined" stage design, "appealing" music and a "well-developed plot that elicited laughter and tears from the audience," Radio Star won Best Musical at the 2009 Daegu Musical Awards, a ceremony that marked the end of the Daegu International Musical Festival. Seo Beom-seok also received the Best Actor award.

Jeong Jun-ha, Im Chang-jung and Kim Won-jun have also starred in later runs.
