= Ernest Sternberg =

American scholar of urban planning

Ernest Sternberg is an American scholar of urban planning who specializes in economic development. He is a professor in the school of Architecture and Planning at the University at Buffalo.

Sternberg attended Empire State College and earned a BA in social sciences. He then attended Cornell University where he earned an MS in development sociology and Southeast Asian studies, and a PhD in city and regional planning.

Sternberg has published extensively about the particular risks that terrorism poses to urban environments.

== Publications ==
- "Purifying the World: What the New Radical Ideology Stands For," Orbis 54:1, Winter 2010, pp. 61–86.
- "Prospects for Building Regional Clusters of Technological Strength in the Homeland Security Sector: The Case of New York State," Journal of Applied Security Studies 4:3, Jul.-Sept. 2009, pp. 341–362.
- (with George C. Lee) "New York City's Healthcare Transportation During Disaster: A Preparedness Framework for a Wicked Problem," Prehospital and Disaster Medicine 25:2, 2009, pp. 95–107
- "The Urban Region as Locus of Security Problems: Toward Research and Education to Safeguard New York and Other Urban Areas from Terrorism and Disaster," Journal of Applied Security Research, 3:1, 2007, pp. 11–24.
- "Planning for Community Health Emergencies: The Research Challenge," Journal of Security Education 1:4, 2006, pp. 133–144.
- "Classical Precariousness versus Modern Risk: Lessons in Prudence." Humanitas (forthcoming).
- "Counting Crises: US Hospital Evacuations 1971-1999," (with George C. Lee and Daniel Huard). Prehospital and Disaster Medicine. (2004)
- "Planning for Resilience in Hospital Internal Disaster." (2003). Prehospital and Disaster Medicine. Vol. 18, No. 4
- "Educating the Economic Strategist." (2002). in James Dator, ed., Advancing Futures: Futures Studies in Higher Education. Westport, CT: Praeger
- "What Makes Buildings Catalytic? How Cultural Facilities Spur Surrounding Development." (2002). Journal of Architecture and Planning Research. Vol. 19, No. 1
- "An Integrative Theory of Urban Design." (2000). Journal of the American Planning Association. Vol. 66, No. 3
- The Economy of Icons: How Business Manufactures Meaning. (1999). Westport, CT: Praeger
- "Transformations: The Forces of Capitalist Change." (1999). in Kenneth Taylor and William E. Halal, eds., 21st Century Economics. Boston, MA: St. Martin's Press
- "The Iconography of the Tourism Experience." (1997). Annals of Tourism Research. Vol. 24
- "Recuperating from Market Failure: Planning for Biodiversity and Technological Competitiveness." (1996). Public Administration Review. Vol. 56, January/February
- Photonic Technology and Industrial Policy: U.S. Responses to Technological Change. (1992). Albany, NY: State University of New York Press
