= Seoul Global Movie Awards =

South Korean awards ceremony

- Hangul: 서울국제영화대상
- RR: Seoul gukje yeonghwa daesang
- MR: Sŏul kukche yŏnghwa taesang
- Awarded for: Achievements in movie and prime time television performances
- Country: South Korea
- Presented by: Korean Film Actors Association; Seoul Metropolitan Government
- Formerly called: Star Night - Korea Top Star Awards (2013–2017); Korea Best Awards (2018–2019)
- First award: 2012
- Website: kfaa.kr/association/intro

The Seoul Global Movie Awards (Korean: 서울국제영화대상) is an award ceremony hosted by the Korean Film Actors Association in cooperation with the Seoul Metropolitan Government. It was formerly known as the Star Night - Korea Top Star Awards Ceremony (2012 to 2017) and the Korea Best Star Awards (2018 to 2019). Although it began as an award for excellence in filmmaking, it has since extended its scope to include overall entertainment.

== History ==
The awards ceremony has undergone several name changes since its inception in 2012. It was initially known as the Star Night - Korea Top Star Awards Ceremony (Korean: 스타의 밤 - 대한민국 톱스타상 시상식). The 2014 edition was jointly held with the 2014 Super Talent of the World event. It was returning to an independent format from 2015 to 2017. The title was changed in 2018, to the Korea Best Star Awards (Korean: 대한민국 베스트 스타상). It was held with the same name in 2019.

Following a hiatus between 2020 and 2023, the ceremony was reintroduced in 2024 as the Seoul Global Movie Awards (Korean: 서울국제영화대상), in partnership with the Seoul Metropolitan Government.

== Ceremony ==
Award ceremonies
#	Year	Event Name	Host	Venue	Date	Ref.
1st	2012	2012 Korean Film Actors Association Year-end Party		Sapphire Ballroom on the 3rd floor of the Lotte Hotel	December 31, 2012	
2nd	2013	Star Night - Korea Top Star Awards Ceremony		Crystal Ballroom of the Lotte Hotel in Sogong-dong, Jung-gu, Seoul	December 27	
3rd	2014	Star Night - Korea Top Star Awards Ceremony	Yoon Hee-joo, Park Jae-hoon, and Kim Ha-jung	Sebitseom Star Night event hall, Sebitseom Island under Banpo Bridge in Seoul	December 21	
4th	2015	Star Night - Korea Top Star Awards Ceremony	Shin Hyun-joon and Lee Da-hee	Grand Ballroom of the Grand Hyatt Seoul in Yongsan-gu, Seoul	December 29	
5th	2016	2016 Star Night - Korea Top Star Awards Ceremony	Choi Yoon-seul, Yoo Song-ah	Grand Ballroom of the Grand Hyatt Seoul in Yongsan-gu, Seoul	December 29	
6th	2017	2017 Star Night - Korea Top Star Awards Ceremony	Lee Ji-ae and Kim Il-joong	Grand Ballroom of Seoul Dragon City	December 28	
7th	2018	2018 Best Star Awards	Kim Gang-hyun and Ha Ji-young	Grand Ballroom of the Grand Hyatt Seoul in Yongsan-gu, Seoul	December 12	
8th	2019	2019 Best Star Awards	Kim Gang-hyun and Park Seul-gi	Crystal Ballroom of the Lotte Hotel in Sogong-dong, Jung-gu, Seoul	December 11	
9th, 10th, 11th	2020 to 2022	—N/a				
12th	2024	Seoul Global Movie Awards	Jo Woo-jong and Jung Da-eun	Crystal Ballroom of the Lotte Hotel in Sogong-dong, Jung-gu, Seoul	December 5	
13th	2025	Seoul Global Movie Awards	Lee Yu-bi and Kim Dong-wan	Hanla Hall of the Dragon City Hotel in Yongsan, Seoul	December 10	

== Award winners ==
=== Best Picture ===
#	Year	Film	OTT Series	Ref.
12th	2024	The Roundup: Punishment	Pyramid Game	

=== Top Star Director Awards ===
#	Year	Proud Filmmaker Award		Ref.
1st	2012	Jang Tae-ryeong		
2nd	2013	Bong Joon-ho; Moon Byung-gon		
3rd	2014	Kim Han-min; Yang Woo-suk		
#	Year	Top Director	Top New Director	Ref.
4th	2015	Lee Joon-ik — The Throne	Lee Byeong-heon — Twenty	
5th	2016	Na Hong-jin — The Wailing	Yeon Sang-ho — Train to Busan	
6th	2017	Jang Hoon — A Taxi Driver	Kang Yoon-sung — The Outlaws	
7th	2018	Yoon Jong-bin — The Spy Gone North	Jeon Go-woon — A Little Princess	
8th	2019	Lee Byeong-heon— Extreme Job	Kim Do-young — Kim Ji-young, Born 1982	
12th	2024	Lee Jong-pil — Escape	Heo Myung-haeng — The Roundup: Punishment	

=== Merit/Lifetime achievement award ===
#	Year	Lifetime achievement award	Special achievement award	Ref.
1st	2012	Ahn Sung-ki; Lee Byung-hun; Kim Ki-duk; Jo Min-soo; Lee Jung-jin		
2nd	2013		Kim Dong-ho	
4th	2015	Ahn Sung-ki		
5th	2016	Ha Cheol-kyung		
6th	2017	Lee Deok-hwa		
7th	2018	Shin Seong-il		
8th	2019	Yoon Jung-hee		
12th	2024	Lee Hae-ryong	Kim Soo-mi	
13th	2025	Baek Il-seob; Jung Hye-sun	Lee Soon-jae	

=== Top Star Actor Awards ===
#	Year	Top Star Actor	Top Star Actress	Ref.
2nd	2013	Hwang Jung-min — New World; Ryu Seung-ryong — Miracle in Cell No. 7; Song Kang-ho — The Face Reader	Uhm Ji-won — Hope; Uhm Jung-hwa — Montage	
3rd	2014	Choi Min-sik – Roaring Currents; Song Kang-ho – The Attorney	Son Ye-jin – The Pirates	
4th	2015	Lee Byung-hun — Inside Men; Yoo Ah-in — The Throne; Ha Jung-woo — Assassination	Han Hyo-joo – Beauty Inside	
5th	2016	Kwak Do-won — The Wailing; Cho Jin-woong — The Handmaiden; Jo Jung-seok — My Annoying Brother	Gong Hyo-jin — Missing	
6th	2017	Choi Min-sik — Heart Blackened; Hyun Bin — Confidential Assignment	Na Moon-hee — I Can Speak; Lee Jung-hyun — The Battleship Island	
7th	2018	Lee Soon-jae – Stand by Me; Kim Yoon-seok — Dark Figure of Crime; Jang Dong-gun — Seven Years of Night	Soo Ae – High Society	
8th	2019	Kim Sang-joong — The Bad Guys: Reign of Chaos; Ryu Seung-ryong — Extreme Job; Lee Jong-hyuk — Love, Again	Kim Ah-joong – The Bad Guys: Reign of Chaos	
12th	2024	Byun Yo-han – Following	Kim Young-ok – Picnic; Na Moon-hee – Picnic	
13th	2025	Sul Kyung-gu	Lee Hye-young	
13th	2025	Sung Dong-il (The Actor of the Year award)		

Best Actor awards, chosen by the film actors
#	Year	Top Star Actor	Top Star Actress	Ref.
13th	2025	Park Ji-hwan	Song Ji-hyo	

Art Film Award
#	Year	Top Star Actor	Top Star Actress	Ref.
13th	2025	Kim Min-jong	Ye Ji-won	

=== Top Star Actor Supporting Awards ===
#	Year	Top Star Supporting Actor	Top Star Supporting Actress	Ref.
3rd	2014	Yoo Hae-jin — The Pirates; Cho Jin-woong — A Hard Day	Jo Yeo-jeong	
4th	2015	Kim In-kwon — C'est Si Bon	Jin Kyung — Veteran	
5th	2016	Lee Kyung-young — Inside Men; Uhm Tae-goo — The Age of Shadows	Park Joo-mi	
6th	2017	Choi Gwi-hwa — A Taxi Driver and The Outlaws	Lee Ha-nui — Heart Blackened and The Bros	
7th	2018	Kim Dong-wook — Along with the Gods: The Last 49 Days	Jin Seo-yeon — Believer	
8th	2019	Kang Ki-young — Exit	Jang Young-nam — Innocent Witness	
12th	2024	Kim Jae-chul — Exhuma	Lee Yoon-ji — Dream Palace	
13th	2025	Park Hee-soon	Han Ji-eun	

=== Top New Actor and Actress ===
#	Year	Top New Actor	Top New Actress	Ref.
7th	2018	Lee Ga-seop — The Seeds of Violence	Jeon Yeo-been — After My Death	
8th	2019	Gong Myung — Extreme Job; Jung Hae-in — I, the Executioner	Park Ji-hoo — House of Hummingbird	
12th	2024	Park Ji-hoon — Beautiful Audrey	Lee Joo-myung — Pilot	
13th	2025	Cha Woo-min	Dahyun	

=== Top Actor in Drama/OTT Series ===
#	Year	Award name	Recipient	Ref.
7th	2018	The Best Drama Star Award	Seo Hyun-jin — The Beauty Inside; Seohyun — The Time	
8th	2019	The Best Drama Star Award	Lee Sang-yeob — Love Affairs in the Afternoon; Son Dam-bi — When the Camellia Blooms	
12th	2024	The Best Drama Star Award	Gong Min-jeung — Marry My Husband	
12th	2024	Jury's Special Award	Uhm Tae-goo — My Sweet Mobster	
12th	2024	Special acting award for OTT	Jeong Yu-mi — Queen Woo	
13th	2025	Best Acting Award in the Drama	Lee Hanee	
13th	2025	Best Actor award in the OTT	Kim Ji-hoon	
13th	2025	Special Jury' Award	Jung Sung-il; Bang Hyo-rin	

=== Popularity award ===
#	Year	Award name	Actor	Actress	Ref.
2nd	2013	Korean Film Popular Star Award	Yeo Jin-goo	Moon Jung-hee; Jang Young-nam	
3rd	2014	Korean Film Popular Star Award	Park Yoo-chun; Yim Si-wan	Lim Ji-yeon; Chun Woo-hee	
3rd	2014	Popular Star Award that Shined Korea	—N/a	Claudia Kim	
3rd	2014	Film Actor Popular Star Award	—N/a	Kim Sae-ron	
4th	2015	Korean Film Popular Star Award	Byun Yo-han; Choi Woo-shik	Lee Yoo-young; Park So-dam	
4th	2015	Popular Star Award that Shined Korea	Kim Soo-hyun	Choo Ja-hyun	
5th	2016	Korean Film Popular Star Award	Joo Ji-hoon; Lee Je-hoon	Jo Yoon-hee; Shin Eun-soo	
6th	2017	Korean Popular Star Award	Yoon Kye-sang; Park Seo-joon; Lee Dong-hwi	Nana; Kim Su-an	
7th	2018	Korean Popular Star Award	Sung Dong-il; Lee Kwang-soo	—N/a	
8th	2019	Popular Star Award	Jo Hyun-jae	—N/a	
8th	2019	Hallyu Star Award	—N/a	Hong Soo-ah	
12th	2024	Popularity Award	Byeon Woo-seok List of nominated artists: Byeon Woo-seok; Jung Hae-in; Song Kang; Cha Eun-woo; Kim Soo-hyun	Go Min-si List of nominated artists: Go Min-si; Go Youn-jung; Han So-hee; Bibi; Hyeri	
13th	2025	Popularity Award	Doh Kyung-soo List of nominated artists: Park Bo-gum; Kim Seon-ho; Ahn Hyo-seop; Doh Kyung-soo; Rowoon	Kim Hye-yoon List of nominated artists: IU; Bae Suzy; Yoona; Park Eun-bin; Kim Hye-yoon	

=== Top entertainer ===
#	Year	Top Entertainer	Ref.
6th	2017	Lee Kwang-soo	
7th	2018	Bae Jung-nam	
8th	2019	Heo Jae	
12th	2024	Im Won-hee	
12th	2024	Lee Joo-seung	

Kim Bo-seong received the Sharing and Volunteer Award, promoting the value of good deeds.

=== Top singer ===
#	Year	Top singer	Ref.
4th	2015	Exo	
4th	2015	Psy (Popular singer)	
5th	2016	Lee Moon-sae; Infinite	
6th	2017	Baek Ji-young; Wanna One	
7th	2018	Ailee	

=== Top athlete ===
#	Year	Top athlete	Ref.
5th	2016	Park Tae-hwan	
6th	2017	Yang Hyeon-jong	
