= Ahn Sung-ki =

South Korean actor (1952–2026)

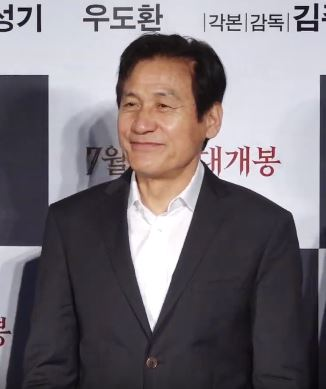
- Ahn in 2019
- Born: January 1, 1952; Daegu, South Korea
- Died: January 5, 2026 (aged 74); Seoul, South Korea
- Education: Hankuk University of Foreign Studies (Vietnamese studies)
- Occupation: Actor
- Years active: 1957–2025
- Agent: Artist Company
- Spouse: Oh So-yeong (m. 1985)
- Children: 2
- Honours: Bogwan Order of Cultural Merit (2005); Eungwan Order of Cultural Merit (2013); Geumgwan Order of Cultural Merit (2026) (Note: Awarded posthumously)

Korean name
- Hangul: 안성기
- Hanja: 安聖基
- RR: An Seonggi
- MR: An Sŏnggi

Ahn Sung-ki (Korean: 안성기; January 1, 1952 – January 5, 2026) was a South Korean actor. Known as one of the country's most respected actors, he is the recipient of numerous accolades in a career on screen spanning six decades.

Born in Daegu to a father working in the film industry, Ahn made his acting debut in 1957 as a child actor in the film Twilight Train (1957). In 2005 during Culture Day, he received Bogwan Order of Cultural Merit. He served as chairman of Korean Film Actors Association from 2006 to 2008.

== Early life and education ==
Ahn Sung-ki was born in Daegu on January 1, 1952, the child of Ahn Hwa-young who was a film planner. Ahn began his career as a child actor at age six with the film Twilight Train (1957). In 1970, Ahn enrolled as a Vietnamese major at Hankuk University of Foreign Studies and graduated with top honors, but later stated that his studies limited his job opportunities following the communist victory in the Vietnam War in 1975.

== Career ==
He stopped acting in films to concentrate on his studies but was active in theater as a student at Hankuk University of Foreign Studies. He completed mandatory military service in 1976 as an artillery officer after earning his commission via the Reserve Officers' Training Corps program.

After his military discharge, Ahn resumed his acting career. He won recognition in the 1980 film A Fine, Windy Day and was named Best New Actor at the Grand Bell Awards. This was followed by a Best Film Actor Award at the 1982 Baeksang Arts Awards for his role as a Buddhist monk in Im Kwon-taek's critically-acclaimed Mandala, still regarded by critics as one of the best domestic films of all time. Ahn notably shaved his head for the role. Over the years, he began diversifying his repertoire.

In 1993, He and Park Joong-hoon starred in the hit buddy cop-comedy Two Cops and won the Grand Prize (Daesang) (Note: A Daesang (Korean: 대상), which translates to "Grand Prize", is the highest honor given out at South Korean award ceremonies.) at the Baeksang Arts Awards. Their on-screen chemistry as fellow detectives was highly popular with audiences and has been retrospectively dubbed the original on-screen "bromance" of Korean cinema.

Ahn played the president of South Korea twice, in the movies The Romantic President (2002) and Hanbando (2006). In 2003, Ahn starred in the semi-biographical film Silmido, which also starred several other notable names. It was the first domestic film to sell over 10 million tickets. The phrase "Shoot me and go" uttered by his character became iconic and spawned many parodies and caricatures.

In 2006, Ahn and his Two Cops co-star Park Joong-hoon reunited for the film Radio Star (2006), directed by acclaimed director Lee Joon-ik. Despite stiff competition from Tazza: The High Rollers, which was released on the same day, it was still a critical and commercial success, with Park and Ahn being nominated for or winning several awards. That year, Ahn also starred in the Hong Kong-China period co-production A Battle of Wits alongside top stars Andy Lau and Fan Bingbing. During this period, he was known to be a vocal critic of the halving of screen quotas that allows foreign films to be shown in theaters on certain days, while domestic films are allotted another number of days. At that time he was serving as a committee member in the leadership of Korean Film Actors Association and joined the union's two demonstrations in solidarity with other notable film directors, actors and actresses.

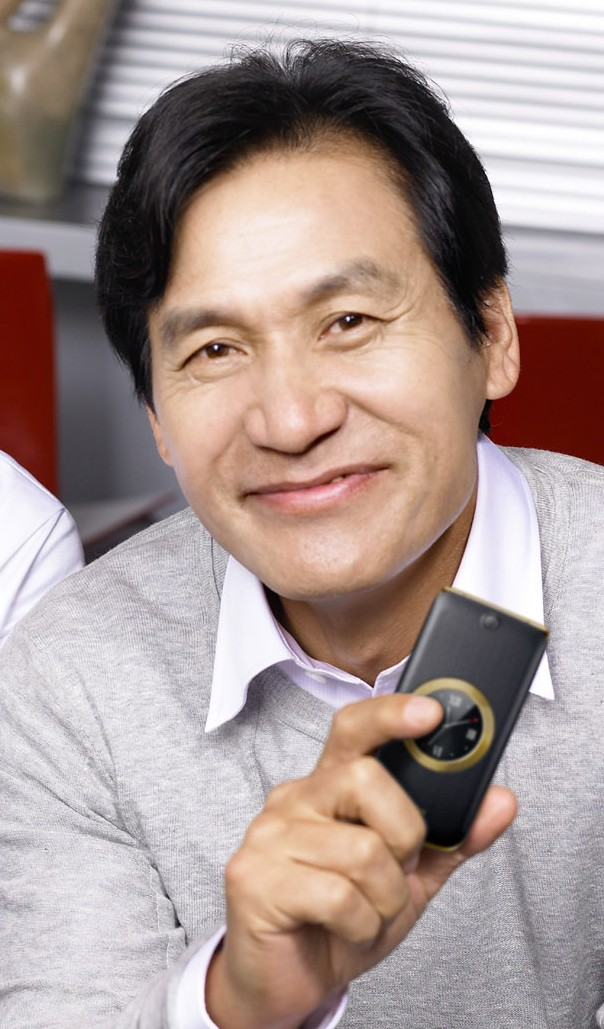
Ahn for LG in 2009

Ahn surprised critics and commentators by appearing in the low-budget semi-biographical 2011 film Unbowed since it had been rejected by major distributors due to its controversial content. It was released to minimal fanfare but quickly became a sleeper hit due to its "David and Goliath" storyline which resonated with viewers. Usually known for portraying warm or fatherly characters, he portrayed a mathematics professor furious at the injustice he suffered at the hands of corrupt judicial officials. The critically-acclaimed film became an unexpected box office hit, earning Ahn awards at the Korean Association of Film Critics Awards and Baeksang Arts Awards.

On August 6, 2021, Ahn signed a contract with Artist Company.

== Recognition ==
A much respected figure in the film industry, Ahn is often dubbed the "Nation's Actor" (Korean: 국민배우) by the media, although he himself stated that he prefers being known simply as another film actor. He has been described as an actor "who boasts a truly diverse and vast filmography that changes with the times". He served as vice president and president of the Korean Film Actors Association.

In 2008, he received the Nikkei Asia Prize in Culture and Community.

On June 23, 2012, Ahn and Lee Byung-hun became the first actors from Asia to leave their hand and foot prints on the forecourt of Grauman's Chinese Theatre in Hollywood, Los Angeles. He was recommended by the Korean Film Producers Association for his body of work.

In 2013, Ahn was awarded the Order of Cultural Merit (Eungwan, 2nd Class) by the Ministry of Culture, Sports and Tourism.

== Personal life and death ==
Ahn was close friends with singer-songwriter Cho Yong-pil. They were childhood friends and schoolmates at the now-defunct Kyungdong Middle School and remained friends even though they attended different high schools.

Ahn married sculptor and university professor Oh So-yeong in 1985 at Myeongdong Cathedral. They have two sons, one of whom married at the same venue the day after his parents' 33rd wedding anniversary. A devout Catholic, Ahn was one of 30 Catholic celebrities who appeared in the 2014 music video for the digital single "Koinonia" to commemorate the visit of Pope Francis to South Korea, the first time in 19 years that the pope visited Asia.

Because of his ability to speak several foreign languages, UNICEF appointed Ahn as a representative, and his image is often seen in advertisements on planes travelling to Korea.

In 2019, Ahn was diagnosed with blood cancer. In December 2025, he was hospitalized in critical condition after choking on food at his residence. Ahn died at Soonchunhyang University Hospital in Seoul, on January 5, 2026, at the age of 74.

South Korean President Lee Jae-myung said Ahn Sung-ki "left a great footprint in Korean film history" and added that he did not "discriminate between the lead and supporting roles".

== Tribute ==
In a special program in collaboration with the Korean Film Archive to revisit his life, the 31st Busan International Film Festival will present six films in its run in October 2026.

== Filmography ==
=== Film ===
Year	Title	Role	Notes	Ref.
1957	Twilight Train			
1958	The Lullaby			
1958	A Mother's Love	Sin-ho (as a child)		
1958	The Tears			
1958	The First Snow			
1959	A Sister's Garden			
1959	Defiance of a Teenager			
1959	A Long Affection			
1959	Even Love is Passing			
1960	A Tragedy on Earth			
1960	Over The Hill			
1960	The Housemaid	Chang-sun		
1960	A Love History	Seok-jae		
1960	Mother Earth			
1961	Don't Worry, Mother!			
1961	My Sister Is a Hussy			
1961	A Dream of Fortune			
1962	As Time Passes, Love and Sorrow Will...	Child		
1962	A Salaryman			
1962	Bravo, Young Ones!	Child		
1962	Mojacho			
1962	Only for You			
1963	A Winter Vagabond			
1963	The Overbridge of Hyeonhae Strait			
1963	The Wife and the Woman			
1963	Angry Cosmos	Child		
1964	The Apron			
1964	The Teacher with Ten Daughters			
1964	Just Watch What We Do and See			
1965	A Legend of Urchins			
1965	The Nickname of the Student			
1965	44 Myeongdong			
1966	Yeraehyang			
1967	The White Crow			
1977	The Soldier and the Girls			
1978	The Third Mission			
1979	Night Markets			
1979	Uyoil			
1980	A Fine, Windy Day	Doek-bae		
1981	Mandala	Beop-un		
1981	A Dwarf Launches a Little Ball	Yeong-su		
1981	Children of Darkness	Tae-bong		
1982	Another's Nest			
1982	Village in the Mist	Kae-cheol		
1982	People in the Slum	Ju-seok		
1982	Come Unto Down	Mr. Sung		
1982	Polluted Ones			
1982	Iron Men			
1983	Lying Like Grass			
1983	The Flower at the Equator			
1984	Whale Hunting	Min-woo		
1984	The Deep, Deep Place			
1984	Between the Knees	Cho-bin		
1984	Warm It Was That Winter	Il-hwan		
1985	Whale Hunting 2			
1985	Deep Blue Night	Baek Ho-bin		
1985	Eoudong	Gal-mae		
1986	Hwang Jin-yi			
1986	Lee Jang-ho's Baseball Team	Hye-sung		
1986	Moonlight Hunter	Jeong-ho		
1986	Winter Wanderer			
1986	Eunuch			
1987	Our Joyful Young Days	Kim Young-min		
1987	Hello God	Kim Byung-tae		
1987	Seongnisuildyeon			
1988	Chilsu and Mansu	Mansu		
1988	The Age of Success	Kim Pan-chok		
1988	Gagman	Lee Jeong-se		
1990	Nambugun	Lee Tae		
1990	The Dream	Jo Shin		
1991	Stairways of Heaven	Kim Yeong-kyun		
1991	Teenage Love Song	Jae-chil		
1991	Berlin Report	Seong-min		
1991	Who Saw the Dragon's Toenail?	Choi Jong-su		
1992	White Badge	Han Ki-ju		
1992	Blue in You	Lee Ho-suk		
1993	Two Cops	Jo Hyeong-sa		
1993	To the Starry Island	Kim Cheol		
1994	The Taebaek Mountains	Kim Boem-u		
1994	Affliction of Man			
1995	The Eternal Empire	Jeong Ju		
1995	Mom, the Star, and the Sea Anemone	Choi Seon-jang		
1995	Declaration of Genius	Lee Sang-han		
1995	The Hair Dresser	Henri Park		
1996	Sleeping Man	Takuji		
1996	Festival	Lee Jun-seop		
1996	The Adventure of Mrs. Park	Mr. X		
1998	Alien (Taekwondo)	Kim		
1998	Bedroom and Courtroom	Myeong Seong-ki		
1998	Spring in My Hometown	Seong-min's father		
1998	The Soul Guardians	Park Shin-bu		
1998	Art Museum by the Zoo	In-gong		
1999	Nowhere to Hide	Chang Seong-min		
1999	Andante Cantabile	No Gwa-jang		
2000	Black Hole	Na		
2000	Truth Game	Jo Geom-sa		
2000	Kilimanjaro	Beon-ge		
2001	Musa	Jin-rib		
2001	The Last Witness	Hwang Seok		
2002	My Beautiful Girl, Mari	Gyeong-min	Voice	
2002	Chi-hwa-seon	Kim Byeong-moon		
2002	The Romantic President	President Han Min-wook		
2003	Silmido	Jae-hyeon		
2004	Arahan	Ja-woon		
2005	Duelist	Detective Ahn		
2006	The Bad Utterances	Narrator		
2006	Hanbando	President		
2006	Radio Star	Park Min-su		
2006	A Battle of Wits	Xiang Yan-zhong		
2007	May 18	Heung-su		
2008	My New Partner	Father Kang Min-ho		
2008	The Divine Weapon	King Sejong		
2010	The Fair Love	Hyeong-man		
2011	Ari, Ari, The Korean Cinema	Himself		
2011	Fool	Narrator		
2011	Sector 7	Lee Jeong-man		
2011	Unbowed	Kim Kyeong-ho		
2012	Pacemaker	Coach Park Seong-il		
2012	Superstar	Himself	Cameo	
2012	The Tower	Seo-jang		
2013	Jury	Seong-ki		
2013	Rough Play	Jeonju festival VIP	Cameo	
2013	Top Star	Kim Kyung-min	Cameo	
2014	Tabloid Truth	Nam Jung-in	Cameo	
2014	The Divine Move	Ju-nim		
2014	Revivre	Oh Jeong-seok		
2015	Last Knights	Auguste		
2015	Love and...	Grandfather		
2016	The Hunt	Moon Ki-sung		
2018	Human, Space, Time and Human	The old man		
2019	The Divine Fury	Father Ahn		
2020	Paper Flower	Yoon Sung-Kil		
2021	In the Name of the Son	Oh Chae Geun		
2022	Cassiopeia	In-woo		
2022	Hansan: Rising Dragon	Eo Yeong-dam		
2022	A Birth	Yoo Jin-gil		
2023	Noryang: Deadly Sea	Eo Yeong-dam	Cameo	

== Accolades ==
=== Awards and nominations ===
Name of the award ceremony, year presented, category, nominated work, and the result of the nomination
Award ceremony	Year	Category	Nominated work	Result	Ref.
Asia-Pacific Film Festival	1987	Best Actor	Our Joyful Young Days	Won	
Asia-Pacific Film Festival	1993	Best Actor	White Badge	Won	
Baeksang Arts Awards	1982	Best Actor (Film)	Mandala	Won	
Baeksang Arts Awards	1983	Best Actor (Film)	Village in the Mist	Won	
Baeksang Arts Awards	1984	Best Actor (Film)	Flower on the Equator	Won	
Baeksang Arts Awards	1985	Best Actor (Film)	Deep Blue Night	Won	
Baeksang Arts Awards	1987	Best Actor (Film)	Moonlight Hunter	Nominated	
Baeksang Arts Awards	1987	Most Poplar Actor (Film)	Moonlight Hunter	Won	
Baeksang Arts Awards	1988	Best Actor (Film)	Hello God	Nominated	
Baeksang Arts Awards	1989	Best Actor (Film)	The Age of Success	Won	
Baeksang Arts Awards	1991	Best Actor (Film)	Who Saw The Dragon's Toenail?	Won	
Baeksang Arts Awards	1993	Best Actor (Film)	The Blue in You	Nominated	
Baeksang Arts Awards	1994	Grand Prize (Daesang) in Film	Two Cops	Won	
Baeksang Arts Awards	1994	Best Actor (Film)	Two Cops	Won	
Baeksang Arts Awards	1995	Best Actor (Film)	The Eternal Empire	Nominated	
Baeksang Arts Awards	1997	Best Actor (Film)	Festival	Nominated	
Baeksang Arts Awards	2012	Best Actor (Film)	Unbowed	Won	
Baeksang Arts Awards	2013	Lifetime Achievement Award (for Social Contributions)	—N/a	Won	
Baeksang Arts Awards	2015	Best Actor (Film)	Revivre	Nominated	
Beautiful Art Awards (Shin Young-kyun Arts and Culture Foundation)	2026	Good People Artist Award	Ahn Sung-ki	Won	
Blue Dragon Film Awards	1990	Best Lead Actor	Nambugun	Won	
Blue Dragon Film Awards	1990	Popular Star Award	Nambugun	Won	
Blue Dragon Film Awards	1991	Best Lead Actor	Who Saw the Dragon's Toenail?	Nominated	
Blue Dragon Film Awards	1992	Best Lead Actor	White Badge	Nominated	
Blue Dragon Film Awards	1992	Poulqr Star Award	White Badge	Won	
Blue Dragon Film Awards	1993	Best Lead Actor	The Blue in You	Nominated	
Blue Dragon Film Awards	1994	Best Lead Actor	Two Cops	Nominated	
Blue Dragon Film Awards	1995	Best Lead Actor	The Hair Dresser	Nominated	
Blue Dragon Film Awards	1996	Best Lead Actor	The Adventures Of Mrs. Park	Nominated	
Blue Dragon Film Awards	1998	Best Lead Actor	Bedroom And Courtroom	Nominated	
Blue Dragon Film Awards	2001	Best Supporting Actor	Musa	Won	
Blue Dragon Film Awards	2005	Best Supporting Actor	Duelist	Nominated	
Blue Dragon Film Awards	2006	Best Lead Actor (shared with Park Joong-hoon)	Radio Star	Won	
Blue Dragon Film Awards	2012	Best Lead Actor	Unbowed	Nominated	
Buil Film Awards	2012	Best Actor	Unbowed	Nominated	
Buil Film Awards	2015	Best Actor	Revivre	Nominated	
The Brand Laureate Awards	2021	Legendary Award	—N/a	Won	
Chicago Indie Film Festival	2021	Best Actor	In the Name of the Son	Won	
Cine21 Film Awards	1996	Best Actor	The Eternal Empire	Won	
Cine21 Film Awards	1997	Best Actor	Festival	Won	
Chunsa Film Awards	1990	Best Actor	Nambugun	Won	
Chunsa Film Awards	2006	Best Actor	Hanbando	Nominated	
Chunsa Film Awards	2008	Best Actor	My New Partner	Nominated	
Chunsa Film Awards	2016	Best Actor	Revivre	Nominated	
Golden Cinema Film Festival	1990	Best Popular Actor	Nambugun	Won	
Golden Cinema Film Festival	2007	Special Acting Award	Radio Star	Won	
Golden Cinema Film Festival	2011	Lifetime Achievement Award	—N/a	Won	
Golden Cinema Film Festival	2015	Best Popular Actor	Revivre	Won	
Golden Cinema Film Festival	2023	Lifetime Achievement Award	—N/a	Won	
Grand Bell Awards	1960	Best Young Actor	The Housemaid	Won	
Grand Bell Awards	1980	Best New Actor	A Fine, Windy Day	Won	
Grand Bell Awards	1982	Best Actor	Man of Iron	Won	
Grand Bell Awards	1983	Best Actor	Village in the Mist	Won	
Grand Bell Awards	1985	Best Actor	Deep Blue Night	Won	
Grand Bell Awards	1986	Best Actor	Moonlight Hunter	Nominated	
Grand Bell Awards	1991	Best Actor	Nambugun, Who Saw the Dragon's Toenail?	Nominated	
Grand Bell Awards	1991	Popular Actor Award	Nambugun, Who Saw the Dragon's Toenail?	Won	
Grand Bell Awards	1993	Best Actor	White Badge	Nominated	
Grand Bell Awards	1993	Popular Actor Award	White Badge	Won	
Grand Bell Awards	1994	Best Actor (shared with Park Joong-hoon)	Two Cops	Won	
Grand Bell Awards	1994	Popular Actor Award (shared with Park Joong-hoon)	Two Cops	Won	
Grand Bell Awards	1994	Social Contribution Award	—N/a	Won	
Grand Bell Awards	1995	Best Actor	The Eternal Empire	Nominated	
Grand Bell Awards	1995	Popular Actor Award	The Eternal Empire	Won	
Grand Bell Awards	2000	Best Actor	Truth Game	Nominated	
Grand Bell Awards	2006	Best Supporting Actor	Duelist	Nominated	
Grand Bell Awards	2006	50th Anniversary of Debut Award	—N/a	Won	
Grand Bell Awards	2007	Best Actor	Radio Star	Won	
Grand Bell Awards	2012	Best Actor	Unbowed	Nominated	
Grand Bell Awards	2022	Lifetime Achievement Award	—N/a	Won	
Huston International Film Festival	2020	Best Actor	Paper Flower	Won	
San Francisco International Film Festival	1959	Spacial Young Actor	—N/a	Won	
Korea Culture and Entertainment Awards	2021	Grand Prize (Daesang)	In the Name of the Son	Won	
KOFRA Film Awards	2019	Special Achievement Award	—N/a	Won	
Korean Association of Film Critics Awards	1983	Best Actor	Polluted Ones	Won	
Korean Association of Film Critics Awards	1984	Best Actor	Village in the Mist	Won	
Korean Association of Film Critics Awards	1994	Best Actor	Two Cops	Won	
Korean Association of Film Critics Awards	1995	Best Actor	The Eternal Empire	Won	
Korean Association of Film Critics Awards	1996	Best Actor	Festival	Won	
Korean Association of Film Critics Awards	2006	Best Actor	Radio Star	Won	
Korean Association of Film Critics Awards	2012	Best Actor	Unbowed	Won	
Korean Association of Film Critics Awards	2015	Special Award	—N/a	Won	
Korean Association of Film Critics Awards	2022	Lifetime Achievement Award (Film)	—N/a	Won	
Marie Claire Asia Star Awards	2026	Cinema Luminary Award	—N/a	Won	
Wildflower Film Awards	2023	Best Actor	Cassiopeia	Nominated	
Wildflower Film Awards	2023	Achievement Award	—N/a	Won	

=== State honors ===
Name of country, award ceremony, year given, and name of honor
Country	Award Ceremony	Year	Honor	Ref.
South Korea	Awarded posthumously	2026	Geumgwan Order of Cultural Merit (1st class)	
South Korea	Korean Culture and Arts Awards (Note: Since 1973, honors are given at Cultural Day (문화의 날), 3rd Saturday in October by the Ministry of Culture, Sports and Tourism)	2005	Bogwan Order of Cultural Merit (3rd Class)	
South Korea	Korean Popular Culture and Arts Awards (Note: Honors are given at the Korean Popular Culture and Arts Awards, arranged by the Korea Creative Content Agency and hosted by the Ministry of Culture, Sports and Tourism. They are awarded to those who have contributed to the arts and South Korea's pop culture.)	2013	Eungwan Order of Cultural Merit (2nd Class)	

=== Listicles ===
Name of publisher, year listed, name of listicle, and placement
Publisher	Year	Listicle	Placement	Ref.
The Screen	2009	1984–2008 Top Box Office Powerhouse Actors in Korean Movies	1st	
Korean Film Council	2021	Korean Actors 200 (Note: Introduces 200 actors that best represent the present and future of Korean cinema to the people in the film industry all over the world.)	Included	
