= Jung Seung-hye =

South Korean film producer (1965–2009)

- Born: March , 1965
- Died: May 17, 2009 (aged 44)
- Occupation: Film producer
- Years active: 1989–2009

Korean name
- Hangul: 정승혜
- Hanja: 鄭升惠
- RR: Jeong Seunghye
- MR: Chŏng Sŭnghye

Jung Seung-hye (Korean: 정승혜; March 1965 – 17 May 2009) was a South Korean film producer.

Jung began her career as a film promoter for Shin Cine in 1989, working on the film Happiness Does Not Come From Grades. She later moved to Cine World where she produced a number of films, including Anarchists (2000) and Once Upon a Time in a Battlefield (2003). Following the commercial success of The King and the Clown in 2005, Jung founded her own company, Achim Pictures, and produced films such as Radio Star (2006), Shadows in the Palace (2007) and Sunny (2008). In 2006 she was honored with the annual Women in Film Award by the Women in Film Korea organization.

In addition to her production work, Jung was a film columnist and worked as a copywriter on a number of domestic and foreign film productions. She was the author of several books, including Jung Seung-hye's Cartoon Theater and Jung Seung-hye's Lion's Cage.

Jung died from colon cancer on 17 May 2009, aged 44. She had been suffering from the illness since 2006, and was hospitalized a month prior to her death after the cancer spread to her lungs.
