= Ahn Junghyo =

South Korean novelist (1941–2023)

- Born: 2 December 1941; Keijō, Korea, Empire of Japan
- Died: 1 July 2022 (aged 81)
- Citizenship: South Korean
- Writing career
- Language: Korean

- Korean name
- Hangul: 안정효
- Hanja: 安正孝
- RR: An Jeonghyo
- MR: An Chŏnghyo

Ahn Junghyo (Note: This is the author's preferred Romanization per LTI Korea) (2 December 1941 – 1 July 2023) was a South Korean novelist and literary translator.

== Life ==
Ahn Junghyo was born on 2 December 1941, in Seoul, where he graduated from Sogang University with a BA in English literature in 1965. He worked as an English-language writer for The Korea Herald in 1964, and later served as a director for The Korea Times in 1975–1976. He was editorial director for the Korean division of Encyclopædia Britannica from 1971 to 1974.

Ahn made his debut as a translator in 1975, when he published a Korean translation of One Hundred Years of Solitude by Gabriel García Márquez, which was serialized in the monthly Literature & The Intellect. From that time until the late 1980s, he translated approximately 150 foreign works into Korean.

Ahn died of cancer on 1 July 2023, at the age of 82.

== Work ==
His first novel was Of War and the Metropolis, now known as White War (하얀전쟁), which was published in 1983 to a chilly critical reception. It discussed his experiences as a Republic of Korea Army soldier in the Vietnam War. He translated it into English and had it published in the United States, where it was released by Soho Press in 1989 under the title The White Badge. In 1992 it was also made into a film, White Badge, shot on location in Vietnam. The book was then reissued in Korea as White War in 1993, and was received much more favorably than before.

== Works in Korean ==
- White Badge (1983/1989)
- Autumn Sea People (가을바다 사람들) (1993)
- Silver Stallion (1990)
- The Life of the Hollywood Kid (헐리우드키드의 생애) (1992)

== Awards ==
- Kim Yoo-jung Literary Award (1992)

== See also ==
- Korean literature
- Contemporary culture of South Korea
