= Korean Film Actors Association =

South Korean professional organization

The Korean Film Actors Association
- The Korean Film Actors Association
- Founded: January 13, 2023
- Headquarters: 515 Elcru Metro City, 13 Chungmuro, Jung-gu, Seoul
- Location: South Korea
- Chairman: Lee Gap-seong
- Website: kfaa.kr/association/intro

Korean name
- Hangul: 한국영화배우협회
- RR: Hanguk yeonghwabaeu hyeophoe
- MR: Han'guk yŏnghwabaeu hyŏphoe

The Korean Film Actors Association (Korean: 한국영화배우협회) is a non-profit organization operating under the Ministry of Culture, Sports and Tourism of South Korea. It was officially established on January 13, 2003, for the purpose of protecting the rights and interests of Korean film actors, promoting their welfare, and fostering camaraderie among its members. Its primary goal is to represent the rights and interests of actors and to carry out various activities to improve their status within the industry. The association is currently led by Chairman Lee Gap-seong.

== History ==
The foundations of the association trace back to the pioneering efforts of Jeon Taek-yi, a central figure in establishing formal organizations for Korean actors and filmmakers. In 1947, Jeon Taek-yi founded the Film Research Society. Following this, in 1955, Jeon Taek-yi, alongside Kim Il-hae, Seo Wol-yeong, and Yoon Il-bong, founded the Korean Film Actors Association—considered the direct predecessor of the current organization. The founding meeting for this predecessor association was held at the American Information Agency theater.

The organization was formally recognized in 2003, officially transitioning into the non-profit entity known today as the Korean Film Actors Association, operating under the Ministry of Culture, Sports and Tourism of South Korea.

== Leadership ==
Association's chairman
Term	Tenure	Name	Notes (Association Name)	Ref.
Representative	December 25, 1953 – 1954	Jeon Taek-il	Film Research Committee	
1st	1955 – 1955	Jeon Taek-il	Korea Film Actors Association	
2nd–6th	1956 – 1960	Bok Hye-suk	Korea Film Actors Association (Incorporated)	
7th, 8th	1961 – 1962	Bok Hye-suk	Acting Subcommittee of the Korea Film Professionals Association (Incorporated)	
9th–12th	1963 – 1966	Kim Seung-ho	Acting Subcommittee of the Korea Film Professionals Association (Incorporated)	
24th	1985 – 1987	Yoon Yang-ha	Acting Subcommittee of the Korea Film Professionals Association (Incorporated)	
29th, 30th	November 2002 – 2005	Shin Seong-il	Korea Film Actors Association (Incorporated)	
31st	2006 – 2008	Ahn Sung-ki	Korea Film Actors Association (Incorporated)	
32nd	2009 – 2011	Lee Deok-hwa	Korea Film Actors Association (Incorporated)	
33rd, 34th	2012 – 2017	Geo Ryong	Korea Film Actors Association (Incorporated)	
35th	2018 – 2021	Kim Kuk-hyeon	Korea Film Actors Association (Incorporated)	
36th	2021 – 2024	Lee Jin-young	Korea Film Actors Association (Incorporated)	
37th	2024 to present	Lee Gap-seong.	Korea Film Actors Association (Incorporated)	

== Awards event ==
From 2012 to 2017, it was known as the Star Night - Korea Top Star Awards Ceremony (스타의 밤 - 대한민국 톱스타상 시상식). In 2014, the event held jointly with the Super Talent of the World event. For the years 2015, 2016, and 2017, it was held independently again. In 2018, It was rebranded as the Korea Best Star Awards (대한민국 베스트 스타상). It was held with the same name in 2019. Following a hiatus from 2020 to 2023, the ceremony was reintroduced in 2024 as the Seoul Global Movie Awards, held in cooperation with the Seoul Metropolitan Government.

The association announced on September 5, 2024, that it is launching its inaugural scenario contest. This contest aims to discover new writers and directors, accepting original screenplays from anyone, regardless of subject or material. The association will award one Grand Prize, two Awards of Excellence, and two Encouragement Awards, totaling 50 million won in prize money. The Grand Prize winner will receive 15 million won, the Excellence winners 10 million won each, and the Encouragement winners 7.5 million won each.
