= The Taebaek Mountains (film) =

- Poster to The Taebaek Mountains (1994)
- Hangul: 태백산맥
- Hanja: 太白山脈
- RR: Taebaeksanmaek
- MR: T'aebaeksanmaek
- Directed by: Im Kwon-taek
- Written by: Cho Jeong-lae; Song Neung-han
- Based on: Taebaek Sanmaek by Jo Jung-rae
- Produced by: Lee Tae-won
- Starring: Ahn Sung-ki; Bang Eun-jin
- Cinematography: Jung Il-sung
- Edited by: Park Sun-duk
- Music by: Kim Soo-chul
- Distributed by: Taehung Pictures
- Release date: September 17, 1994
- Running time: 168 minutes
- Country: South Korea
- Language: Korean
- Box office: $440

The Taebaek Mountains (Korean: 태백산맥; RR: Taebaeksanmaek) is a 1994 South Korean film directed by Im Kwon-taek. It is named for the Taebaek Mountains on the Korean peninsula.

== Plot ==
The film originates from the great river story Taebaegsanmaek consisting of 10 volumes written by Cho Jeong-rae. The story describes generational conflict between the haves (proprietors and landlords) and have nots (peasants) that eventually develops into right- and left-wing ideology, respectively. While showing why and how the conflict came about, the story depicts romantic, shamanic and Confucian aspects of the contemporaries.

== Reception ==
Korean film scholar Kim Kyung-hyun described the reception of The Taebaek Mountains by audiences and critics as "lukewarm."

== Awards ==
=== Wins ===
- Blue Dragon Film Awards Best Film (1994)

=== Nominations ===
- Golden Bear, 45th Berlin International Film Festival (Im Kwon-taek) (1995)

=== Presented ===
- Telluride Film Festival (1999)
