= The Age of Success =

1988 South Korean film

Age of Success
- Poster for Age of Success (1988)
- Hangul: 성공시대
- Hanja: 成功時代
- RR: Seonggongsidae
- MR: Sŏnggongsidae
- Directed by: Jang Sun-woo
- Written by: Jang Sun-woo
- Produced by: Hwang Gi-seong; Park Yong-bin
- Starring: Ahn Sung-ki; Lee Hye-young
- Cinematography: You Young-gil
- Edited by: Kim Hyeon
- Music by: Yi Zong-gu
- Distributed by: Hwang Ki-Seong Production
- Release date: June 4, 1988 (South Korea)
- Running time: 110 minutes
- Country: South Korea
- Language: Korean

Age of Success (Korean: 성공시대; RR: Seonggongsidae; also known as Taste of Heaven) is a 1988 South Korean film written and directed by Jang Sun-woo.

== Synopsis ==
The Age of Success is a melodrama about lust for success and revenge at a company that makes sweeteners.

== Cast ==
- Ahn Sung-ki as Kim Pan-chok
- Lee Hye-young as Sung So-bi
- Choi Bong

== Bibliography ==
- "The Age of Success (Seong-gong siDae)(1988)". KMDb Korean Movie Database.
- Kim, Kyung-hyun (2004). "6. New Korean Cinema Auteurs: Jang Sun-woo's Three 'F' Words: Familism, Fetishism, and Fascism: Age of Success". The Remasculinization of Korean Cinema. Durham and London: Duke University Press. pp. 171–177. ISBN 0-8223-3267-1.
- Min, Eung-jun; Joo Jin-sook; Kwak Han-ju (2003). "4. Auteur Criticism: The Case of Sunwoo Jang's Taste of Heaven". Korean Film; History, Resistance, and Democratic Imagination. Westport, Connecticut: Praeger. pp. 85–111. ISBN 0-8223-3267-1.
- Songgong sidae (1988) at IMDb
