= Mandala (film) =

- Theatrical poster
- Hangul: 만다라
- Hanja: 曼陀羅ㆍ曼茶羅
- RR: Mandara
- MR: Mandara
- Directed by: Im Kwon-taek
- Written by: Kim Seong-dong (novel); Lee Sang-hyon; Song Kil-han
- Produced by: Park Chong-chan
- Starring: Ahn Sung-ki; Jeon Moo-song; Kim Jong-su
- Cinematography: Jeong Il-seong
- Edited by: Lee Do-won
- Music by: Kim Chong-gil
- Distributed by: Hwa Chun Trading Company
- Release date: September 12, 1981
- Running time: 117 minutes
- Country: South Korea
- Language: Korean

Mandala (Korean: 만다라) is a 1981 South Korean film about Buddhist monks in Korea based on the novel of the same name by Kim Seong-dong, who spent 10 years as a Buddhist monk. The film is considered by many critics to be director Im Kwon-taek's breakthrough as a cinematic artist.

== Plot ==
A bus stops in front of a checkpoint and soldiers begin to check the passengers. Monk Ji-san is caught without proper ID, and the young monk Beop-woon follows him. Ji-san is released after chanting Buddha's name as ordered by the soldiers.

Beop-woon meets Ji-san again while the latter drinks at a temple. Ji-san says Buddha is not found only at Buddhist temples, and Beop-woon realizes that he has achieved nothing after six years of practice. Beop-woon follows Ji-san as he sets off again. After repeatedly splitting up and reuniting again, they begin living together at a small hermitage in the mountains. Ji-san, who helps a shaman with the traditional Buddhist ritual of opening the eyes, asks who will do the same for him, drinks alcohol, assumes a lotus position and freezes to death. Beop-woon cremates Ji-san in a ceremony and gives a Buddha statue that Ji-san had to Ok-sun, a woman the late monk could never forget. Beop-woon eventually meets his mother, who abandoned him as a child, for the last time and embarks on a long road of suffering.

== Awards ==
- Best Director, 20th Grand Bell Awards (South Korea)
- Grand Prix Hawaii Film Festival

== Sources ==
- "Im Kwon-taek's Retrospective". [5th Festival of Korean Cinema in Italy]. 2007.
- James, David E. (2001). "Im Kwon-Taek - Korean National Cinema and Buddhism". Film Quarterly. Vol. 54, no. 3 (April). pp. 14–31.
- Mandala at IMDb
- "Mandala". The Hollywood Reporter. Vol. 277, no. 14. 1983-06-09. p. 13.
