= Festival (1996 film) =

- Poster to Festival (1996)
- Hangul: 축제
- Hanja: 祝祭
- RR: Chukje
- MR: Ch'ukche
- Directed by: Im Kwon-taek
- Written by: Yook Sang-hyo
- Based on: Festival by Lee Cheong-jun
- Produced by: Lee Tae-won
- Starring: Ahn Sung-ki; Han Eun-jin
- Cinematography: Park Seung-bae
- Edited by: Park Soon-deok
- Music by: Kim Soo-chul
- Distributed by: Taehung Pictures
- Release date: June 6, 1996 (South Korea)
- Running time: 108 minutes
- Country: South Korea
- Language: Korean

Festival (Korean: 축제) is a 1996 South Korean drama film directed by Im Kwon-taek and based on the novel of the same title by Lee Cheong-jun.

== Synopsis ==
A famous writer, Lee Joon-seop, returns to his hometown to attend his mother's funeral. Lee's illegitimate niece, who has been ostracized from the family, has also returned home for the funeral. While the funeral ceremonies take place, various old family conflicts reassert themselves. During the action of the story, a parallel children's story written by Lee is read by the illegitimate niece. The story describes a grandmother who gives her life force to her growing granddaughter, resulting in the grandmother becoming gradually younger until she reverts into an infant and finally leaves for the next world.

== Cast ==
- Byeong-kyeong Ahn as Sae-mal A-jae
- Lee Eol as Won-il
- Kim Gyung-ae as old sister who lives in Gwangju (as Gyung-ae Kim)
- Eun-jin Han as Joon-sup's Mother
- Kim Jong-goo
- Jung Kyung-soon as Jang Hye-rim
- Geum-ju Lee as Choi Ji-hyeon
- Jung-Hee Nam
- Jung-hae Oh as Lee Yong-soon
- Jeong Seon-kyeong (as Seon-kyeong Jeong)
- Ahn Sung-ki as Lee Joon-sup(as Sung-kee Ahn)

== Director's statement ==
"In a sense, the life we enjoy now is the result of how our ancestors have lived. The preceding generations are bound to leave their legacy to the following generations-parents to their children, teachers to their students, and seniors to their juniors. Even a person who seems to lead an independent life by and of himself is strongly influenced by his ancestors. I see the entire process as tremendously beautiful and sincerely dream to show the viewers of my movie the true sense of this ongoing phenomenon.
A funeral serves as the starting point for this movie. The funeral is for a warm-hearted eighty-seven-year-old lady who had strived to help those in need throughout her life.
Through the motif of the funeral, the most extensively scaled ceremony in life, I have tried to explore the meaning of death and its effects shadowing the bereaved. I have also tried to bring to light the sentiments of the survivors: their sorrow, egoism, solemnity and even frivolity. I want to give the viewers who see this film a moment to think about what is truly valuable and precious in our quickly changing world. At this moment, I consider this goal my duty as a director.."
-- Im Kwon-taek

== Release ==
In a special program in collaboration with the Korean Film Archive to revisit Ahn Sung-ki's life, the 31st Busan International Film Festival will present the film in its run in October 2026.

== Reception ==
During the 2000 Inter-Korean summit, North Korean leader, Kim Jong Il specifically mentioned Festival along with Im Kwon-taek's later Chunhyang (2000) as models of the type of cinematic works on which the two Koreas could work together.

== Awards ==
- Best Film, Blue Dragon Film Awards

== Availability ==
Festival was released on Region 3 DVD in South Korea with English subtitles, but as of October 2007 is currently out of print. It is available for viewing on the Korean Film Archive's YouTube page with English subtitles.

== Sources ==
- Brennan, Sandra. "Festival". Allmovie.
- Chukje (1996) at IMDb
- "Chukje (Festival); Korea 1996". [27th International Forum of New Cinema 1997]. 1997.
- "Im Kwon-taek's Retrospective". [5th Festival of Korean Cinema in Italy]. 2007.
- "Festival, 'Chukje' (1996)". [seoulselection.com]. Archived from the original on December 29, 2006.
- Kim, Ji-seok. "On screen", Cinemaya #33, July 1996, p. 40-41.
- Kwak, Han Ju (2002). "In Defense of Continuity: Discourses on Tradition and the Mother in Festival". In James, David E. & Kim Kyung-hyun (ed.). Im Kwon-Taek: The Making of a Korean National Cinema. Detroit: Wayne State University Press. pp. 223–246. ISBN 0-8143-2869-5.
- Rooney, David (1997-03-03). "Film reviews". Variety. p. 72.
