= Vietnamese studies =

Study of Vietnamese culture

The location of Vietnam

Vietnamese studies (Vietnamese: Việt Nam học), or Vietnamology, in general is the study of Vietnam and things related to Vietnam. It refers, especially, to the study of modern Vietnamese and literature, history, ethnology, and the philological approach, respectively.

The specialist in this area is called a Vietnamist.

== University programs ==
Several major universities in the United States offer a Vietnamese studies major or program, including Columbia University the University of Houston, University of California, and Yale University. These schools, as well as many others, including Hobart and William Smith Colleges, offer a study abroad exchange program. The Vietnam National University, Hanoi has a comprehensive Institute of Vietnamese Studies and Development Sciences. The Tokyo University of Foreign Studies also offers a program in the field.

In Central Europe, the oldest university, Charles University in Prague, also offers a study programme focused on Vietnamese studies, formerly Ethnology with Vietnamese and since 2019 renamed Asian Studies: Vietnamese. Masaryk University in Brno offers a Vietnamese Studies programme and Palacký University Olomouc offers Vietnamese Philology and also Asian Studies with Specialization on Vietnamese Language and Culture.

In Germany, Vietnamese Studies (Vietnamistik) has been taught at the Asien-Afrika-Institut of the University of Hamburg since 1982. Vietnamese studies that took place in 1970 at Berlin's Humboldt University, four years after German unification was entered with the Institute of Oriental Studies and Studies in Southeast Asia. In 1998, the position of professor of Vietnamese studies was canceled. From 2002 until now Jörg Thomas Engelbert is professor of the field at the University of Hamburg. In Bulgaria, a BA degree programme "South, East, Southeast Asia" was introduced in Sofia University in 2013. The curriculum focuses on the Asian region and includes Vietnamese Studies specialisation.

== See also ==
- Southeast Asian studies
- Asian studies
