= White Badge =

1992 film directed by Jeong Ji-yeong

- DVD cover
- Hangul: 하얀전쟁
- Hanja: 하얀戰爭
- RR: Hayanjeonjaeng
- MR: Hayanjŏnjaeng
- Directed by: Chung Ji-young
- Written by: Gong Su-young; Chung Ji-young; Jo Young-chel; Shim Seung-bo
- Based on: White Badge: A Novel of Korea by Ahn Jung-hyo
- Produced by: Chong Nam-gook
- Starring: Ahn Sung-ki; Lee Geung-young; Shim Hye-jin
- Cinematography: Yoo Yong-kil
- Edited by: Park Soon-deok
- Music by: Shin Bung-ha
- Distributed by: Vanguard Cinema (North America)
- Release date: July 4, 1992
- Running time: 124 minutes
- Country: South Korea
- Language: Korean

White Badge (Korean: 하얀전쟁) is a 1992 South Korean war film directed by Chung Ji-young based on the book White Badge: A Novel of Korea by Ahn Jung-hyo. It was commercially successful and critically acclaimed, receiving the Grand Prix award in the fifth Tokyo International Film Festival.

It depicts the experience of South Korean soldiers who fought in the Vietnam War alongside American troops. White Badge follows the path of two South Korean soldiers as they struggle to deal with their experiences in the Vietnam War.

== Plot summary ==
Kiju Han, a journalist, must face his memories of Vietnam as he writes a series of articles on the subject for his local newspaper. The articles attract a fellow veteran, Chinsu Pyeon, who begins randomly appearing in Han's life. The film, through a series of flashbacks, depicts both the events in Vietnam and their aftermath in the lives of these two soldiers.

== Release ==
In a special program in collaboration with the Korean Film Archive to revisit Ahn Sung-ki's life, the 31st Busan International Film Festival will present the film in its run in October 2026.
