= Village in the Mist =

- Film poster
- Hangul: 안개마을
- RR: Angaemaeul
- MR: An'gaemaŭl
- Directed by: Im Kwon-taek
- Written by: Song Gil-han
- Produced by: Park Chong-chan
- Starring: Jeong Yun-hui; Ahn Sung-ki
- Cinematography: Jung Il-sung
- Edited by: Kim Chang-sun
- Music by: Kim Jung-gil
- Distributed by: Hwa Chun Trading Company
- Release date: February 12, 1983
- Running time: 93 minutes
- Country: South Korea
- Language: Korean

Village in the Mist (Korean: 안개마을; RR: Angaemaeul) or Village of Haze is a 1983 South Korean mystery drama film directed by Im Kwon-taek.

== Plot ==
Unmarried Soo-ok leaves Seoul to teach at a remote village elementary school. She slowly begins to realize that there is a sexual connection between a local vagabond and the village's women, despite their men claiming that the vagabond is impotent.

== Cast ==
- Jeong Yun-hui
- Ahn Sung-ki
- Park Ji-hun
- Jin Bong-jin
- Oh Young-hwa
- Lee Ye-min
- Kim Ji-young
- Jo Nam-gyeong
- Choi Dong-joon
- Jo In-seon
