= Southeast Asian studies =

Study of Southeast Asian history and culture

Southeast Asian studies (SEAS) refers to research and education on the language, culture, and history of the different states and ethnic groups of Southeast Asia. Some institutions refer to this discipline as ASEAN Studies since most of the countries that they study belong to the Association of Southeast Asian Nations or ASEAN. Definitions of what constitutes Southeast Asia differ between scholars, which blurs the boundaries between Southeast Asian studies and other regional studies like Oriental studies and post-colonial studies. Southeast Asian studies incorporates anthropology, religious studies, linguistics, and international relations.

== Definitions of Southeast Asia ==
The boundaries of Southeast Asia are contested due to historical, cultural, and linguistic similarities between some groups in Southeast Asia and neighboring regions like India and China. Many scholars of Southeast Asian studies rely on the Association of Southeast Asian Nations (ASEAN) to create a concrete list of nations that fit under the umbrella of Southeast Asia. As of 2016, members of ASEAN include Brunei Darussalam, Cambodia, Indonesia, Lao People's Democratic Republic, Malaysia, Myanmar, Philippines, Singapore, Thailand, and Vietnam.

== History of the discipline ==
=== Before and During the Second World War ===
While the term "Southeast Asia" was first used in connection with the present region by American priest and educator Howard Malcom in 1837, the region presently referred to as Southeast Asia was split between India and the Far East by anglophone scholars prior to the Second World War and de-emphasized as an area of study due to the presence of national interests in the region. Initial inquiries into the culture and traditions of Southeast Asia were primarily conducted by German and Austrian scholars who had greater access to the region because their home countries had no colonies in the region The strategic importance of numerous locales in Southeast Asia such as the Dutch East Indies and the Philippines during the Second World War attracted increased attention from the West. This newfound attention led to the establishment of Mountbatten's South-East Asia Commant (SEAC) in 1943, and the publication of the first map of Southeast Asia by the National Geographic society in 1944.

=== Postwar ===
Immediately after the conclusion of the Second World War, the beginnings of the Cold War drew the attention of United States think tanks and intelligence organizations away from Southeast Asia. Events such as the 1949 Revolution in China and fear about the spread of communism re-centered much of the monetary focus on to China and the Soviet Union. This led to two results: while funding and the commitment of corporations to the area decreased, oversight also decreased; researchers in the West were free to pursue most avenues of interest without the objection of their sponsors.

=== In East Asia ===
In Japan, Southeast Asian studies became a more concrete field of study in the period after Japanese colonization of the region during the Pacific War. The Center for Southeast Asian Studies at Kyoto University was founded in 1963, and The Japan Society for Southeast Asian History was founded in 1966 In the United States, the rise of communism in Vietnam and Laos brought Southeast Asian studies to the forefront of academia and politics. In Korea, academics began forming groups focusing on the region of Southeast Asia in the 1990s. In 1991, the Korean Association of Southeast Asian Studies (KASEAS). Southeast Asian studies in South Korea focuses mainly on Southeast Asia's relationship with other regions in Asia, trans-border migration within and outside Southeast Asia, and the spread of Korean Wave in the region.

== Publication ==
Southeast Asian Studies is also the English name of the Japanese scholarly journal Tonan Ajia Kenkyu. The journal has been published since 1963 by the Center for Southeast Asian Studies at Kyoto University.

== Programs by country ==
Universities that offer studies of Southeast Asia are listed by region:

=== Southeast Asia ===
- Ateneo de Manila University
- De la Salle University
- Chulalongkorn University
- Gadjah Mada University
- Mahidol University International College
- National University of Singapore
- Silliman University
- Thammasat University
- University of Indonesia
- University of Malaya
- University of Asia and the Pacific
- University of the Philippines Diliman
- Walailak University
- Kasetsart University
- Chiang Mai University
- Naresuan University
- Khon Kaen University
- Ho Chi Minh City Open University

=== East Asia ===
- Beijing Foreign Studies University
- Beijing International Studies University
- City University of Hong Kong
- Jinan University
- Kyoto University
- National Chi Nan University
- National Sun Yat-sen University
- Sogang University
- Sophia University
- Sun Yat-sen University
- Tokyo University of Foreign Studies
- Xiamen University

=== North America ===
- Arizona State University
- Columbia University
- Cornell University
- Indiana University Bloomington
- Johns Hopkins University
- Northern Illinois University
- Ohio University
- University of British Columbia
- University of California, Berkeley
- University of California, Los Angeles
- University of California, Riverside
- University of Hawaiʻi at Mānoa
- University of Illinois
- University of Michigan
- University of Pittsburgh
- University of Toronto
- University of Washington, Seattle
- University of Wisconsin, Madison
- Yale University

=== Europe ===
- Lund University, Centre for East and South-East Asian Studies
- Università degli Studi di Napoli "L'Orientale"
- School of Oriental & African Studies (University of London)
- University of Hull
- Heidelberg University
- Contemporary Asian Studies - University of Amsterdam
- Southeast Asian Studies - Leiden University
- Southeast Asian Studies - Asia Africa Institute at Hamburg University
- Südostasienwissenschaft - University of Bonn
- Südostasienwissenschaften - Goethe University Frankfurt
- Humboldt-Universität zu Berlin
- Centre Asie du Sud-Est - EHESS/CNRS/INALCO - Paris
- Institut national des langues et civilisations orientales - Paris

=== Oceania ===
- The Australian National University
- The University of Western Australia
- University of Sydney
- University of Melbourne

== See also ==
- Burma studies
- Filipinology
- Thai studies
- Vietnamese studies
- Journal of Southeast Asian Studies publisher: Cambridge University Press on behalf of the National University of Singapore.
