= Park Joong-hoon =

South Korean actor (born 1966)

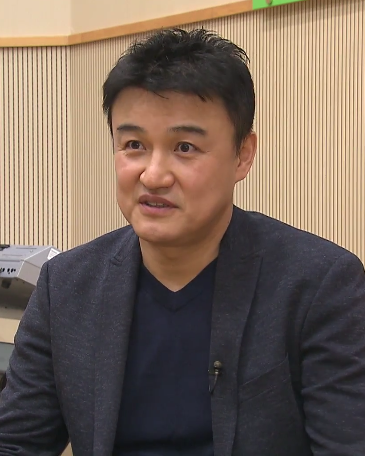
- Park in 2017
- Born: March 22, 1966 (age 60); Eunpyeong-gu, Seoul, South Korea
- Occupation: Actor
- Years active: 1986–present
- Agent: Namoo Actors

- Park Joong-hoon
- Hangul: 박중훈
- RR: Bak Junghun
- MR: Pak Chunghun

Park Joong-hoon (born March 22, 1966) is a South Korean actor.

== Early life and family ==
Park was born and raised in Eunpyeong-gu, Seoul, South Korea. He was classmates with retired basketball legend Hur Jae at Yongsan High School and attended Chung-Ang University together. Park was part of a "golden generation" of Chung-Ang graduates who went on to establish themselves in the film and television industry: he, Jeon In-hwa and Kim Hee-ae graduated in 1989 while Shin Ae-ra was two years their senior.

Park's wife is Zainichi Korean born in Niigata. He therefore often visits Japan with his family.

== Career ==
Park started his career as an actor in television drama Sarang (1990). In the film Cambo (1985). In 1987, for his performance as a college student in Youth sketch of Mimi and Cheolsu, he won the best new actor award at the Baeksang Arts Awards.

In Chilsu and Mansu (1988), Park gave a brilliant performance in acting as Chil-soo, who leads his life in agony in the society of that time; it created a shock to Korean society.

His performance in My Love, My Bride (1991) was highly esteemed in the Asia Pacific Film Festival, and Park won the Best actor's award.

Park went to the United States in 1992 to enroll in the graduate school of New York University, majoring in acting education. After getting his master's degree, he returned to Korea and appeared in Two Cops (1993), a box office hit, which brought him and Ahn Sung-ki the best actor award at the Grand Bell Awards.

His performance as a tough police officer in Nowhere to Hide (1999) gave Park the opportunity to appear in a Hollywood film; the film director Jonathan Demme watched this film at Deauville Asian Film Festival, and offered him the role of an Asian villain in The Truth About Charlie (2002), the remake of Stanley Donen's Charade.

In 2006, Park reunited with his Two Cops co-star Ahn Sung-ki in Radio Star, portraying a rock star. He won the best actor's award of Blue Dragon Film Awards with Ahn but missed Grand Bell Awards; only Ahn got the prize.

From April 11–17, 2007, the event "Park Joong-hoon Mini Retrospective" was held at Jacob Burns Film Center, presenting six films. It was the first time for an Asian actor retrospective to be held there. During the event, Park had talk sessions with Jonathan Demme and Ahn Sung-ki.

Near the end of decade, Park came back into the limelight with Haeundae (2009), Korea's first disaster film that situates itself in a tsunami coming to the popular beach of Busan.

Park is opposed to reducing Screen quota, along with Ahn Sung-ki, Choi Min-sik and others; he became second actor (the first is Ahn, and the third is Choi) of relay demonstration by actors and film directors, on February 5, 2006.

== Filmography ==
=== Television ===
Year	Title	Role	Notes
2017	Bad Guys 2	Woo Je-moon	

=== Film ===
Year	Film	Original Title	Role	Notes
1985	Cambo	깜보		First film
1987	Youth sketch of Mimi and Cheolsu	미미와 철수의 청춘 스케치	Kim Cheol-soo	Baeksang Arts Awards, Best New Actor
1987	Tohwa	됴화	Yong-i	
1987	Don Quixote on Asphalt			
1988	Bioman	바이오맨	Jang Do-il	
1988	Chilsu and Mansu	칠수와 만수	Jang Chil-soo	Korean Association of Film Critics Awards, Best Actor
1988	Sunshine at Present	지금은 양지		
1989	Ae-ran	애란		Cameo appearance
1989	Don Quixote, My Lover	내 사랑 동키호테		
1990	They are Also Like Us	그들도 우리처럼	Lee Seong-chul	
1990	Lovers in Woomukbaemi	우묵배미의 사랑	Bae Il-do	Baeksang Arts Awards, Best Actor; Korean Association of Film Critics Awards, Best Actor
1990	My Love, My Bride	나의 사랑 나의 신부	Kim Young-min	Asia Pacific Film Festival, Best Actor
1993	The Young Man	젊은 남자		special appearance
1993	Two Cops	투캅스	Kang Min-ho	Grand Bell Awards, Best Actor and Most Popular Actor (with Ahn Sung-ki)
1994	Rules of the Game	게임의 법칙	Lee Yong-de	Blue Dragon Film Awards, Best actor
1994	How to Top My Wife	마누라 죽이기	Park Bong-soo	
1995	Gunman	총잡이	Park Tae-seo	
1995	A man who wags his tail	꼬리치는 남자	Baek Jae-soo	
1995	Million in My Account	돈을 갖고 튀어라	Jung Tal-soo	Baeksang Arts Awards, Most Popular Actor
1996	Two cops 2	투캅스 2	Kang Min-ho	
1996	Final Blow	깡패수업	Hwang Seong-chul	
1996	Change	체인지	an electrical mechanic	Using the plot of Japanese drama Houkago
1997	Do the Right Thing	똑바로 살아라	Ma Go-bong	
1997	Hallelujah	할렐루야	Ryang Tok-wong	Baeksang Arts Awards, Best Actor
1997	Wanted	현상수배	Sonny / "J"	Based on his original story. The entire cast play their roles in English.
1997	Karma	인연	Jang Ji-hoon	
1998	American Dragons	아메리칸 드레곤	Kim	American / Korean credits
1999	Nowhere to Hide	인정사정 볼 것 없다	Woo Deon-suk	Baeksang Arts Awards, Best Actor; Korean Association of Film Critics Awards, Best Actor; Blue Dragon Film Awards, Best Supporting Actor; Deauville Asian Film Festival, Lotus du Meilleur Acteur (Best Actor)
2000	A masterpiece in my life	불후의 명작	Kim Yin-ki / Pierrot	
2001	Say Yes	세이 예스	"M"	
2002	Red Nameplate			
2002	The Truth About Charlie		Il-Sang Lee	American credits
2003	Once Upon a Time in a Battlefield	황산벌	Kye-Baek	
2004	Two Guys	투 가이즈	Park Joong-tae	
2004	Heaven's Soldiers	천군	Yi Sun-sin	
2006	Les Formidables	강적	Ha Seong-woo	
2006	Radio Star	라디오 스타	Choi Gon	Blue Dragon Film Awards, Best Actor (with Ahn Sung-ki)
2009	Tidal Wave	해운대	Kim Hwi	
2010	My Dear Desperado	내 깡패 같은 애인	Oh Dong-chul	
2011	Hanji	달빛 길어올리기	Pil-yong	
2011	Officer of the Year	체포왕	Hwang Jae-sung	
2013	Top Star	톱스타	—N/a	Directorial debut

=== Talk show ===
Year	Title
2008-2009	Park Joong-hoon's Holiday Talk Show

=== Variety show ===
- Guesthouse Daughters (KBS, 2017)

=== Music video appearances ===
Year	Song Title	Artist
	"나 그대에게 모두 드리리"	Zee Young-sun
	"Because We Are Two (둘이라서)"	Eru

=== Radio programs ===
- Park Joong-hoon's Popular Songs (1988–1989 KBS Radio 4 (Now Cool FM/2FM)/KBS Radio 2 (KBS-FM))
- Park Joong-hoon's Radio Star (January 9, 2017 – December 31, 2018 as a DJ/January 9, 2017–present as the producer of the program KBS Radio 2 (KBS-FM))

== Accolades ==
=== Listicles ===
Name of publisher, year listed, name of listicle, and placement
Publisher	Year	Listicle	Placement	Ref.
Forbes	2010	Korea Power Celebrity 40	38th	
