= The Blue in You =

1992 South Korean film

The Blue In You
- Film poster
- Hangul: 그대 안의 블루
- RR: Geudae anui beullu
- MR: Kŭdae anŭi pŭllu
- Directed by: Lee Hyun-seung
- Written by: Lee Hyun-seung
- Produced by: Lee Sun-yeol
- Starring: Ahn Sung-ki; Kang Soo-yeon
- Cinematography: Chung Kwang-suk
- Edited by: Kim Hyun
- Music by: Kim Hyun-chul
- Production companies: Sekyung Film Co., Ltd.
- Release date: December 25, 1992 (South Korea)
- Running time: 115 minutes
- Country: South Korea
- Language: Korean

The Blue in You (Korean: 그대 안의 블루; RR: Geudae anui beullu) is a 1992 South Korean romance film directed by Lee Hyun-seung. It stars Ahn Sung-ki and Kang Soo-yeon as two window displayers with conflicting viewpoints who fall in love.

== Plot ==
Ho-seok, a window displayer, encounters Yoo-lim running towards him in a wedding dress. Impressed by her determination to find love while working, they become colleagues through a thorough contract. Despite their disagreements, Ho-seok admires her passion for work and hopes she establishes herself as a hardworking woman. However, Yoo-lim meets someone new, falls in love, and gets married. A misunderstanding caused by his view on work leaves Ho-seok frustrated, and he leaves for Italy. During her married life, Yoo-lim receives a videotape from Ho-seok of her work, and she finally reunites with him in Italy. She decides to leave her husband and Ho-seok behind and start a new life on her own.

== Cast ==
- Kang Soo-yeon as Yoo-lim
- Ahn Sung-ki as Ho-seok
- Choi Yu-ra
- Kim Hyeong-il
- Kang Neung-won
- Nam Young-jin
- Na Hye-young
- Park Yong-pal

== Production ==
The film started principal photography on June 2, 1992. After finishing filming in Italy, post-production began in November of the same year, taking place in Japan. The movie's art staff was composed of professional designers and creatives; Lee himself was originally a visual designer. Post-production saw the use of color grading to shade scenes in hues such as blue, purple, and red, though flashbacks were left as originally filmed.

== Release and reception ==
The Blue in You opened on December 25, 1992, and was the sole domestic film screening at the end of the year. The Korean Film Council included it in its selection of 5 good movies from the first half of 1993. By the end of 1993, the film had accumulated an audience of 153,000 people.

Critics at the time praised the film's visual direction. A review in the Kyunghyang Shinmun said its "dynamic camerawork, varied composition and angling, and speedy scene changing" differentiated it from other Korean films. Movie critic Yoo Ji-na stated that the movie's artistic direction "proves that how a movie is made is as important as its themes and story." Kim Young-hye praised the film's visual elements as well, but expressed that the film "failed due to a weak sense of theme."

The film's feminist message was widely debated over. In The Dong-A Ilbo, reviewer Lee Seung-jeong stated the film "depicts well the changing of women to fit into the illusion of conventional happiness", though she voiced that the female lead's self-discovery only through the male lead revealed "the director's lack of departure from a patriarchal viewpoint". Nam In-young criticized the film's feminist angle, stating that the main female character was "by no means a woman who breaks through social and institutional oppression on her own". On the other hand, Yoo Ji-na said of the ending: "While it is true that Yoo-lim establishing her identity under Ho-seok's control might hurt a feminist's ego, the director may be intentionally showing that in order to secure women's agency in a male-dominated society, there must be many male feminists with progressive thinking and understanding of men's vested interests." A debate on the film's feminist themes was held on January 12, 1993, with the director and various film critics in attendance.

== Awards and nominations ==
1992 4th Chunsa Film Art Awards

- Best New Director – Lee Hyun-seung

1993 17th Golden Cinematography Awards

- Best Popular Actress – Kang Soo-yeon
- Best Cinematography (Gold Award) – Jeong Gwang-seok
- Best Lighting – Shin Hak-sung
- Associate Member Award – Kim Yun-soo

1993 31st Grand Bell Awards

- Best Art Direction – Park Yeong-gi, Cho Young-sam
- Best Costume Design – Gee Choon-hee, Lee Gyeong-hui

1993 14th Blue Dragon Film Awards

- Best New Director – Lee Hyun-seung
- Technical Award – Ahn Sang-soo
