= Unbowed =

- Theatrical release poster
- Hangul: 부러진 화살
- RR: Bureojin hwasal
- MR: Purŏjin hwasal
- Directed by: Chung Ji-young
- Written by: Chung Ji-young; Han Hyeon-geun
- Produced by: Kim Ji-yeon
- Starring: Ahn Sung-ki; Park Won-sang; Na Young-hee; Kim Ji-ho
- Cinematography: Kim Hyung-koo
- Edited by: Kim Sang-bum; Kim Jae-bum
- Music by: Kim Joon-seok
- Production company: Aura Pictures
- Distributed by: Next Entertainment World
- Release dates: 9 October 2011 (BIFF); 18 January 2012 (South Korea)
- Running time: 100 minutes
- Country: South Korea
- Language: Korean
- Budget: US$1.3 million
- Box office: US$22,132,903

Unbowed (Korean: 부러진 화살; RR: Bureojin hwasal; lit. 'Broken Arrow') is a 2011 South Korean legal drama film starring Ahn Sung-ki, Park Won-sang, Na Young-hee, and Kim Ji-ho. It was inspired by the true story of Kim Myung-ho, a math professor who was arrested for shooting a crossbow at the presiding judge of his appeal against wrongful dismissal.

This was director Chung Ji-young's first film after a 13-year hiatus and it received a 13-minute ovation at its 2011 Busan International Film Festival premiere.

Unbowed was produced and distributed by Aura Pictures on a low budget of ₩1.5 billion which included marketing and ₩500 million for production. Ji-yeong said making the film would not have been possible without the actors' willingness to work for very little pay, commending their passion.

After it was released in theaters on January 18, 2012, the outrage resonated with South Korean viewers, and word of mouth turned it into an unexpected box office hit with 3.4 million tickets sold.

== Plot ==
In 1995, an untenured professor of mathematics named Kim exposes an error in the College Scholastic Ability Test, leading to the humiliation of the professors who drafted it. A few years later, he is denied tenure and forced to resign despite the high quality of his research. Kim relocates to the United States for a time, but flies back to South Korea after the laws are amended to allow rejected professors to file wrongful dismissal law-suits.

In 2007, with his case lost and his appeal dismissed, Kim decides to confront the appeals judge at the entrance of the judge's apartment. He brings his sporting cross-bow, which he occasionally fires at a cross-bow range as a hobby. A physical struggle ensues and Kim is arrested. However, the judge, who initially appears uninjured, disappears from the scene and comes out a few minutes later with a minor puncture in his abdomen, and is taken to the hospital. An assault against a judge is a serious crime so the case attracts widespread attention.

Meanwhile, Park, a lawyer heavily in debt, is approached by Kim's wife to adopt the case, but the latter changes her mind when she notices that Park is an alcoholic. Kim's trial proceeds with a different lawyer but Kim pleads No Contest in response to the trial judge's apparent prejudice and dishonesty. Now in prison, Kim files for appeal and hires Park on the advice of Jang, a journalist. To Park's amazement, Kim has extensively studied the law on his own and frequently argues over how to present the case. As the appeals hearings continue, Kim repeatedly confronts the judge and prosecutor over their signs of dishonesty, and cites relevant laws and passages of the constitution which they have violated. With Park and Jang's assistance, he also points out several loop-holes in the prosecutor's evidence and the victim's testimony.

The appeals judge resigns rather than show favor to Kim's side. He is replaced by another appeals judge who does everything possible to obstruct the proceedings and protect the prosecutor, even though it is clear at this point that Kim never shot the victim. Rather, the victim stabbed himself minutes after Kim's arrest, and his family members procured the blood-stained clothes well after he was taken to the hospital. This also explains why the police never found the arrow which punctured the victim. Some citizens begin to riot and protest for Kim's innocence, while on the other hand, a judges' association demands the opposite verdict. Park, who gives up hope, decides to pour water on the appeal's judge as a protest, which would lead to his own imprisonment, but Jang confiscates the water bottles. Around this time, Kim is raped during the night by another male inmate.

The appeal is denied but Kim is given the more lenient sentence of 4 years as opposed to 10. While in prison, he continues to cite the law and to argue with the prison guards, and upon his release becomes a life-long activist for judicial transparency.

== Cast ==
- Ahn Sung-ki - Professor Kim Kyung-ho
- Park Won-sang - Lawyer Park Jun
- Na Young-hee - Kim Kyung-ho's wife
- Kim Ji-ho - Journalist Jang Eun-seo
- Moon Sung-keun - Judge Shin Jae-yeol
- Lee Geung-young - Judge Lee Tae-woo
- Kim Eung-soo - Judge Park Bong-joo
- Jin Kyung - Park Jun's wife
- Kim Joon-bae - Section chief Lee
- Park Soo-il - Prosecutor Shim Joon-bok
- Jung Won-joong - Park Jae-ki
- Han Ki-joong - President of foundation
- Park Gil-soo - Chairman Choi
- Lee Seung-hoon - Lawyer Lee

== Reception ==
When Unbowed was released on January 18, 2012, it was shown in 245 screens, the second lowest number among films released that day. But thanks to its steady popularity, by January 24 the film was shown on 456 screens before the number decreased to 389 the next day. By January 26, the film had attracted 1.4 million admissions. According to data provided by Korean Film Council (KOFIC) it was the third most-watched film in South Korea in the first quarter of 2012, with a total of 3.4 million admissions.

The film ranked #2, but rose to #1 in the second week, and grossed ₩6.8 billion in its first week of release, and grossed a total of ₩24 billion after five weeks of screening.

== Awards and nominations ==
2012 48th Baeksang Arts Awards

- Best Film
- Best Actor - Ahn Sung-ki
- Nomination - Best Director - Chung Ji-young
- Nomination - Best Screenplay - Chung Ji-young, Han Hyun-geun

2012 21st Buil Film Awards

- Nomination - Best Actor - Ahn Sung-ki

2012 32nd Korean Association of Film Critics Awards

- Best Actor - Ahn Sung-ki

2012 49th Grand Bell Awards

- Nomination - Best Film
- Nomination - Best Director - Chung Ji-young
- Nomination - Best Actor - Ahn Sung-ki

2012 33rd Blue Dragon Film Awards

- Best Director - Chung Ji-young
- Nomination - Best Film
- Nomination - Best Actor - Ahn Sung-ki

2013 4th KOFRA Film Awards (Korea Film Reporters Association)

- Best Director - Chung Ji-young
