= Nowhere to Hide (1999 film) =

- Theatrical release poster
- Hangul: 인정사정 볼 것 없다
- Hanja: 人情事情 볼 것 없다
- RR: Injeongsajeong bol geot eopda
- MR: Injŏngsajŏng pol kŏt ŏpta
- Directed by: Lee Myung-se
- Written by: Lee Myung-se
- Produced by: Chung Tae-won
- Starring: Park Joong-hoon; Ahn Sung-ki; Jang Dong-gun; Choi Ji-woo
- Cinematography: Jeong Kwang-seok
- Edited by: Ko Im-pyo
- Music by: Jo Seong-woo
- Distributed by: Cinema Service
- Release date: July 31, 1999 (South Korea)
- Running time: 112 minutes
- Country: South Korea
- Language: Korean

Nowhere to Hide (Korean: 인정사정 볼 것 없다) is a 1999 South Korean action thriller film written and directed by Lee Myung-se. The film stars Park Joong-hoon, Ahn Sung-ki, Jang Dong-gun, and Choi Ji-woo.

== Synopsis ==
Detective Woo, notorious even within the Violent Crimes Unit for his ferocity, is considered a dangerous man. Brutal by nature, yet when it comes to his work he shows an almost mad, obsessive tenacity. One day, a murder case unlike anything he has ever seen comes his way. In broad daylight, in the middle of a busy city, a killing takes place. One of the victims is a three-time convicted drug trafficker.

The police immediately launch an investigation, but a sudden downpour lashes the scene and most of the evidence is long since washed away by the rain. All six members of the Violent Crimes Unit, including Detective Woo and his partner Detective Kim, are assigned to the case. While on stakeout, Woo and Kim arrest Jjang-gu and Young-bae, who were involved in the crime, and learn from them that the mastermind behind it all is Chang Sung-min.

Fifteen days after the incident, the detectives finally come face to face with Chang Sung-min for the first time at the home of his girlfriend, Kim Ju-yeon, but in the maze-like alleys, Woo loses him. Each time, Sung-min slips effortlessly through the police dragnet, as if mocking their incompetence. On the 42nd day after the crime, the detectives receive a tip that Chang Sung-min will make a deal on a train. They secretly take control of the train and surround him, but this elusive criminal is not easily caught.

== Cast ==
- Park Joong-hoon as Detective Woo Young-min
- Ahn Sung-ki as Chang Sung-min
- Jang Dong-gun as Detective Kim Dong-seok
- Choi Ji-woo as Kim Ju-yeon
- Shim Chul-jong as Detective Joo
- Lee Won-jong as Detective Park
- Do Yong-gu as Detective Jang
- Park Seung-ho as Detective Lee
- Gi Ju-bong as Serious crime squad chief
- Kim Jong-gu as Restaurant owner
- Lee Hye-eun as Detective Woo's younger sister
- Song Young-chang as Drug dealer
- Lee Ho-seong as Eom Hyeon-su
- Kwon Yong-woon as Laundromat owner
- Park Sang-myun as Jjang-gu
- Ahn Jae-mo as Young-bae

== Awards ==
Deauville Asian Film Festival (Festival du film asiatique de Deauville) 2000

- Jury Prize
- Best Photography (Jeong Kwang-Seok and Song Haeng-ki)
- Best Actor (Park Joong-hoon)
- Best Director (Lee Myung-se)

Jang Dong-gun won the best supporting actor at the Blue Dragon Film Awards for his role as Detective Kim.

== Reception ==
The film was a hit at both the inaugural Asia Pacific Film Festival in Sydney, and the Sundance Film Festival, but its American release was limited, brief, and unsuccessful.
