= Two Cops =

- Two Cops poster
- Hangul: 투캅스
- RR: Tukapseu
- MR: T'uk'apsŭ
- Directed by: Kang Woo-suk
- Written by: Kim Sung-hong
- Produced by: Kang Woo-suk; Kwon Yeong-rak; Jeon Yang-jun
- Starring: Ahn Sung-ki; Park Joong-hoon; Ji Soo-won
- Cinematography: Jeong Kwang-seok
- Edited by: Kim Hyeon
- Music by: Choi Kyung-sik
- Distributed by: Kang Woo-suk Production (now Cinema Service)
- Release date: December 18, 1993 (South Korea)
- Running time: 110 minutes
- Country: South Korea
- Language: Korean

Two Cops (Korean: 투캅스; RR: Tukapseu) is a 1993 South Korean action comedy film directed by Kang Woo-suk. It stars Ahn Sung-ki and Park Joong-hoon as a pair of police detectives with different outlooks who end up working on a case together.

== Plot ==
The experienced detective Jo has a new partner, Kang who recently graduated from the Police Academy at the top of the class. The idealistic Kang always sticks to his principles and often conflicts with Jo, an amoral cop who always tries to take advantage of his position. Kang tries to win Jo over to his side, but fails. One day, a beautiful woman who works in a bar comes to the police station for help, and Kang falls in love with her. He starts going to the bar often to see her, and begins to become more like Jo. Jo is initially pleased at this, but later begins to experience a dilemma with Kang's change in attitude.

== Cast ==
- Ahn Sung-ki as Jo, senior detective
- Park Joong-hoon as Kang, new recruit
- Ji Soo-won as Soo-won
- Kim Bo-sung as Lee, detective
- Kim Hye-ok as detective Jo's wife
- Shim Yang-hong as police chief
- Yang Taek-jo as unit head

== Reception ==
Despite criticism that its plot was copied from the 1984 French film My New Partner, Two Cops became a box office hit upon its release on December 18, 1993. A highly commercial crowd pleaser that also dealt with the serious theme of police corruption, it was the second most-watched Korean film of 1993, after Sopyonje.

The financial success of Two Cops enabled Kang Woo-suk to set up his own film production and distribution company, Cinema Service.

The film spawned two sequels came : Two Cops 2 (1996), and Two Cops 3 (1998).

== Awards ==
1994 30th Baeksang Arts Awards

- Grand Prize (Daesang) in Film: Ahn Sung-ki
- Best Film: Two Cops
- Best Director: Kang Woo-suk
- Best Actor: Ahn Sung-ki
- Best New Actress: Ji Soo-won

1994 32nd Grand Bell Awards

- Best Actor: Ahn Sung-ki and Park Joong-hoon (tie)
- Most Popular Actor: Ahn Sung-ki, Park Joong-hoon

1994 14th Korean Association of Film Critics Awards

- Best Actor: Ahn Sung-ki

1994 15th Blue Dragon Film Awards

- Most Popular Film (awarded to the movie with the highest viewership throughout the previous year)
