= 34th Buil Film Awards =

2025 edition of award ceremony

- Official poster
- Awarded for: Excellence in cinematic achievements
- Awarded by: Busan Ilbo
- Presented by: Hwaseung Group
- Announced on: Nominations: July 25, 2025
- Presented on: September 18, 2025
- Site: Signiel Busan Grand Ballroom in Haeundae District, Busan
- Hosted by: Kim Nam-gil; Chun Woo-hee
- Official website: 2025 Buil Film Awards

Highlights
- Best Film: House of the Seasons
- Best Director: Hwang Byeong-guk; Yadang: The Snitch
- Best Actor: Lee Byung-hun; The Match
- Best Actress: Kim Go-eun; Love in the Big City
- Best Supporting Actor: Park Jeong-min; Uprising
- Best Supporting Actress: Yang Hee-kyung; The Land of Morning Calm
- Most nominations: Harbin – 7

Television coverage
- Network: Naver TV; YouTube

The 34th Buil Film Awards (Korean: 제34회 부일영화상) ceremony hosted by the Busan-based daily newspaper Busan Ilbo, was held on September 18, 2025, at the Signiel Busan Grand Ballroom in Haeundae District, Busan. In this edition, awards were presented in 16 categories, selected from 149 Korean films released over the past year, from August 11, 2024 to July 10, 2025. Harbin was most nominated in the 7 categories. The awards were announced in a ceremony hosted by South Korean actor Kim Nam-gil and actress Chun Woo-hee. House of the Seasons was awarded the best film, whereas Lee Byung-hun and Kim Go-eun were the winners of the best actor and the best actress award respectively.

== Judging panel ==
The judging panel consisted of 9 members:

=== Main judges ===
- Nam Yu-jeong, Busan Ilbo Culture Department reporter
- Kim Sun-ah, Representative of the Women Filmmakers Association
- Kim Soo-yeon, Professor of Theater and Film at Kyungsung University
- Nam Dong-cheol, film critic
- Park Gwan-soo, Kirin Production Company CEO
- Park In-ho, film critic
- Baek Eun-ha, Director of the Actors' Research Institute
- Song Kyung-won, editor-in-chief of Cine21
- Representative of the Korean Film Producers Association

=== Yu Hyun-mok Film Arts Award Expert Judge ===
- Kang Nae-young, Professor of Theater and Film at Kyungsung University
- Kim Yi-seok, Professor of Film Studies at Dong-Eui University
- Yang Yun-ho, Vice Chairman of the Korean Film Council

== Awards and nominations ==
On September 11, Yu Hyun-mok Film Art Award was announced.

Nominees

Winners were announced on September 18, 2025 in a ceremony hosted by Kim Nam-gil and Chun Woo-hee.

Winners are denoted in bold

**Best Film**	**Best Director**
**House of the Seasons**; Harbin; Uprising; What Does That Nature Say to You; The Land of Morning Calm	**Hwang Byeong-guk – Yadang: The Snitch**; E.oni – Love in the Big City; Kim Hyung-joo – The Match; Woo Min-ho – Harbin; Jeong Yoon-cheol – Sea Tiger
**Best Actor**	**Best Actress**
**Lee Byung-hun – The Match**; Hyun Bin – Harbin; Yoon Joo-sang – The Land of Morning Calm; Ahn Jae-hong – Hi-Five; Jo Jung-suk – Land of Happiness	**Kim Go-eun — Love in the Big City**; Han Ye-ri – Spring Night; Shim Eun-kyung – The Killers; Oh Min-ae – Concerning My Daughter; Lee Hye-young – The Old Woman with the Knife
**Best Supporting Actor**	**Best Supporting Actress**
**Park Jeong-min – Uprising**; Jung Hae-in – I, the Executioner; Oh Man-seok – House of the Seasons; Jo Woo-jin – Harbin; Yoo Jae-myung – Land of Happiness	**Yang Hee-kyung — The Land of Morning Calm**; Jeon Yeo-been – Dark Nuns; Ha Yoon-kyung – Concerning My Daughter; Claudia Kim – A Normal Family; Chae Won-bin – Yadang: The Snitch
**Best New Director**	**Best Screenplay**
**Jang Byung-ki – When Summer Passes By**; Lee Mi-rang – Concerning My Daughter; Kim Tae-yang – Widow; Lee Jong-soo – Fool for Parents; Oh Jung-min – House of the Seasons	**Park Ri-woong – The Land of Morning Calm**; Shin Cheol, Park Chan-wook – Uprising; Oh Jung-min – House of the Seasons; Park Hong-joon – Things to Do; Heo Jun-seok – Land of Happiness
**Best New Actor**	**Best New Actress**
**Choi Hyun-jin – When Summer Passes By**; Moon Woo-jin – Dark Nuns; Noh Sang-hyun — Love in the Big City; Kang Seung-ho – House of the Seasons; Jang Sung-beom – Things to Do	**Lee Hye-ri – Victory**; Lee Myung-ha – Widow; Hong Ye-ji – A Normal Family; Jo Aram – Victory; Roh Yoon-seo – Hear Me: Our Summer
**Best Cinematography**	**Art/Technical Award**
**Hong Kyung-pyo – Harbin**; Kim Jin-hyung – Widow; Lee Jin-geun – House of the Seasons; Joo Sung-rim – Uprising; Lee Jae-woo – The Old Woman with the Knife	**Park Jeong-woo – Harbin – Lighting**; Hong Jang-pyo – The Firefighters – Special Effects; Jung Eun-young – The Match – Production Design; Jo Sang-kyung – Uprising – Costume; Kwak Jung-ae – Harbin – Costume
**Best Music**	**Yu Hyun-mok Film Arts Award**
**Kim Joon-seok – Hi-Five**; Jo Yeong-wook – Harbin; Primary – Love in the Big City; Jo Yeong-wook – Uprising; Kwon Hyun-jung – Because I Hate Korea	**Jang Dong-gun** for **A Normal Family**
**Star of the Year Award (Male)**	**Star of the Year Award (Female)**
**Lee Joon-hyuk**	**Lee Hye-ri**

== Films with multiple nominations ==
The following films received multiple nominations:

Nominations	Films	Categories
8	Harbin	Best Film, Best Director, Best Actor, Best Supporting Actor, Best Cinematography, Art/Technical Award, Best Music
6	Uprising	Best Film, Best Supporting Actor, Best Cinematography, Best Screenplay, Art/Technical Award, Best Music
4	Love in the Big City	Best Director, Best Actress, Best New Actor, Best Music
3	Land of Happiness	Best Actor, Best New Actor, Best Screenplay,
3	The Match	Best Director, Best Actor, Art/Technical Award

== See also ==
- 61st Baeksang Arts Awards
- 46th Blue Dragon Film Awards
