= Made in Korea (TV series) =

2025 South Korean television series

- Hangul: 메이드 인 코리아
- RR: Meideu in Koria
- MR: Meidŭ in K'oria
- Genre: Period drama; Political; Crime; Action thriller
- Written by: Park Eun-gyo; Park Joon-suk
- Directed by: Woo Min-ho
- Starring: Hyun Bin; Jung Woo-sung; Woo Do-hwan; Cho Yeo-jeong; Seo Eun-soo; Won Ji-an; Jung Sung-il; Kang Gil-woo; Roh Jae-won; Lily Franky; Park Yong-woo
- Music by: Jo Yeong-wook
- Country of origin: South Korea
- Original language: Korean
- No. of seasons: 2
- No. of episodes: 12

Production
- Executive producer: Kim Won-guk
- Producers: Yoon Se-yeon; Kim Jin-woo
- Production locations: South Korea; Japan; Thailand
- Cinematography: Kim Tae-sung; Lee Young-woo
- Editor: Jung Ji-eun
- Running time: 53–82 minutes
- Production company: Hive Media Corp
- Budget: ₩70 billion

Original release
- Network: Hulu (Disney+)
- Release: December 24, 2025 – September 23, 2026

Made in Korea (Korean: 메이드 인 코리아) is a South Korean period political television series written by Park Eun-gyo and Park Joon-suk, directed by Woo Min-ho, and starring an ensemble cast led by Hyun Bin and Jung Woo-sung. The series takes place over major events in Korea's modern and contemporary history in the 1970s. The first season premiered on Hulu and Disney+ on December 24, 2025. The second season was released on September 9, 2026.

== Synopsis ==
Baek Ki-tae is a shrewd, ambitious operative for the Korean Central Intelligence Agency (KCIA) who secretly controls illicit business networks to amass power and wealth, while Jang Geon-young is a principled, uncompromising public prosecutor who wants to reveal a corrupt government and law-enforcement agencies. As Geon-young starts his probe into Ki-tae's smuggling operations and their links with high-ranking officials, the two men become embroiled in a perilous rivalry fueled by political conspiracies, criminal enterprises, and conflicting visions of justice.

== Cast and characters ==
=== Main ===
- Hyun Bin as Baek Ki-tae / Matsuda Kenji

A high-ranking agent of the Korean Central Intelligence Agency (KCIA) who leads a secret double life. Outwardly a disciplined government official, he covertly operates smuggling networks to accumulate power and wealth.

- Jung Woo-sung as Jang Geon-young

A relentless prosecutor known for his keen instincts and uncompromising pursuit of justice. He becomes the primary adversary of Ki-tae, committing himself to exposing and dismantling Ki-tae's operations regardless of personal cost.

- Woo Do-hwan as Baek Ki-hyeon

Ki-tae's younger brother and an elite officer who graduated from the Korea Military Academy.

- Cho Yeo-jeong as Bae Geum-ji

The madam of an upscale kisaeng house frequented by powerful figures.

- Seo Eun-soo as Oh Ye-jin

A detective who works as the secretary and investigative partner to prosecutor Geon-young.

- Won Ji-an as Yuji Ikeda / Choi Yu-ji

A powerful figure in the yakuza and a skilled lobbyist who collaborates with Ki-tae.

- Jung Sung-il as Cheon Seok-joong

Chief of the Presidential Security Service who holds power.

- Kang Gil-woo as Kang Dae-il

The underboss of the Manjae gang that controls Busan's economy.

- Roh Jae-won as Pyo Hak-soo

A fellow Korea Military Academy graduate who works for the KCIA and is a peer of Ki-tae.

- Lily Franky as Osamu Ikeda

Yakuza boss.

- Park Yong-woo as Hwang Guk-pyeong

Head of KCIA Busan branch and Ki-tae's superior.

=== Supporting ===
- Cha Hee as Baek So-young

Ki-tae's younger sister.

- Lee Joo-yeon as Jang Hye-eun

Geon-young's younger sister.

== Episodes ==
Season	Episodes	Originally released	
Season	Episodes	First released	Last released
1	6	December 24, 2025	January 14, 2026
2	6	September 9, 2026	September 23, 2026

=== Season 1 ===
No. overall	No. in season	Title	Directed by	Written by	Original release date
1	1	"A Businessman"; Transliteration: "Bijeuniseumaen" (Korean: 비즈니스맨)	Woo Min-ho	Park Eun-gyo and Park Joon-suk	December 24, 2025
2	2	"The Power of the Dog"; Transliteration: "Gaeui him" (Korean: 개의 힘)	Woo Min-ho	Park Eun-gyo and Park Joon-suk	December 24, 2025
3	3	"The Age of Prohibition"; Transliteration: "Geumjiui sidae" (Korean: 금지의 시대)	Woo Min-ho	Park Eun-gyo and Park Joon-suk	December 30, 2025
4	4	"In the Name of the Father"; Transliteration: "Abeojiui ireumeuro" (Korean: 아버지의 이름으로)	Woo Min-ho	Park Eun-gyo and Park Joon-suk	December 30, 2025
5	5	"War of Blood"; Transliteration: "Piui jeonjaeng" (Korean: 피의 전쟁)	Woo Min-ho	Park Eun-gyo and Park Joon-suk	January 7, 2026
6	6	"Made in Korea"; Transliteration: "Meideu in koria" (Korean: 메이드 인 코리아)	Woo Min-ho	Park Eun-gyo and Park Joon-suk	January 14, 2026

=== Season 2 ===
No. overall	No. in season	Title	Directed by	Written by	Original release date
7	1	"Kumicho (The Number One)"; Transliteration: "Jojang (kumicho : ilinja)" (Korean: 組長 (쿠미쵸 : 일인자))	Woo Min-ho	Park Eun-gyo	September 9, 2026
8	2	"Survival of the Fittest"; Transliteration: "Jeokja saengjon" (Korean: 적자생존)	Woo Min-ho	Park Eun-gyo	September 9, 2026
9	3	"Enemy's Enemy"; Transliteration: "Jeokui jeok" (Korean: 적의 적)	Woo Min-ho	Park Eun-gyo	September 16, 2026
10	4	"The Beginning of the End"; Transliteration: "Kkeutui sijak" (Korean: 끝의 시작)	Woo Min-ho	Park Eun-gyo	September 16, 2026
11	5	"God's Will"; Transliteration: "Sinui tteut" (Korean: 신의 뜻)	Woo Min-ho	Park Eun-gyo	September 23, 2026
12	6	"Made in Korea"; Transliteration: "Meideu in koria" (Korean: 메이드 인 코리아)	Woo Min-ho	Park Eun-gyo	September 23, 2026

== Production ==
=== Development ===
Woo Min-ho, who worked on films such as Inside Men (2015), The Drug King (2018), and The Man Standing Next (2020), is at his first directing experience for the small screen with Made in Korea. Hive Media Corp managed the production of the series, which is penned by Park Eun-gyo and Park Joon-suk.

After media reports that the series would be a spin-off of the 2018 film The Drug King, Hive Media Corp denied the correlation and said that it is a different work. The company also denied a report according to which the series would cost ₩48 billion ($US 36 million). On May 23, 2025, the CEO of Hive Media said that the production cost was approximately ₩70 billion ($US 52 million).

At the APAC Showcase in Hong Kong in November 2025, it was confirmed that a second season had already begun its production and was expected to premiere in the second half of 2026.

=== Casting ===
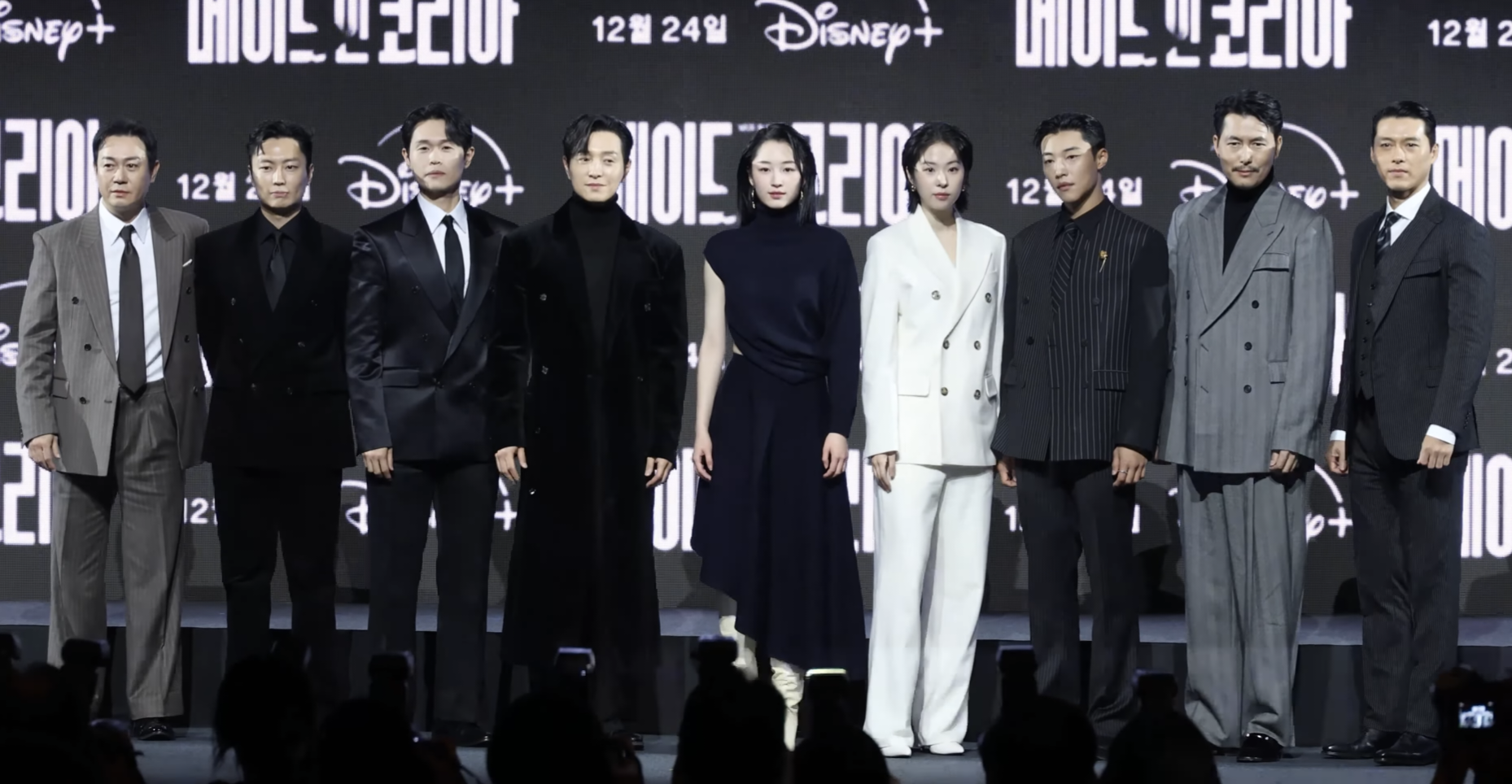
Made in Korea cast at the press conference in December 2025

On February 16, 2024, Hyun Bin was reportedly cast for the series, with his agency Vast Entertainment stating that he was considering but had not decided yet, while Jung Woo-sung confirmed he would lead the series. On August 29, 2024, Hyun was confirmed to star as Jung's rival: it is the second time that Hyun and director Woo work together after Harbin (2024). On July 31, it was reported that Jung Sung-il joined the cast. On August 8, both Won Ji-an and Seo Eun-soo confirmed their appearances.

=== Filming ===
Made in Korea was filmed across multiple international and domestic locations to authentically recreate its 1970s setting. To depict the historical backdrop of 1970s Busan, the production spent approximately one month filming in Kobe, Japan, where urban areas with period-appropriate architecture and port city scenery remain relatively preserved, making it suitable for representing the era's aesthetic. Apart from Japan, the series also featured overseas shoots in Thailand under Mbrella Films, where production support services were offered for a number of locations, including Kanchanaburi and Chonburi, including The 3D Tunnel and Sangchuto Road in Kanchanaburi, Sattahip Beach and the Royal Thai Marine Naval Base Corps in Chonburi.

== Release ==
Disney+ announced that Made in Korea would be released exclusively on their platform in 2025 under Hulu on Disney+ content hub, as well as standalone Hulu service in United States. In November 2025, Disney+ confirmed the release date of the series to be on December 24, 2025, with the first two episodes.

== Accolades ==
Award ceremony	Year	Category	Nominee	Result	Ref.
Baeksang Arts Awards	2026	Best Director	Woo Min-ho	Nominated	
Baeksang Arts Awards	2026	Best Actor	Hyun Bin	Won	
Baeksang Arts Awards	2026	Best Technical Achievement	Kim Tae-sung (Cinematography)	Nominated	
Director's Cut Awards	2026	Best Director in a Series	Woo Min-ho	Nominated	
Director's Cut Awards	2026	Best Actor in a Series	Hyun Bin	Won	
Director's Cut Awards	2026	Best New Actress in a Series	Seo Eun-soo	Nominated	
Director's Cut Awards	2026	Best New Actor in a Series	Park Yong-woo	Nominated	
Director's Cut Awards	2026	Best New Actor in a Series	Jung Sung-il	Nominated	
