= The Spies (2012 film) =

- Promotional poster for The Spy
- Hangul: 간첩
- RR: Gancheop
- MR: Kanch'ŏp
- Directed by: Woo Min-ho
- Written by: Woo Min-ho
- Produced by: Chun Seung-chul; Kim Yong-chae
- Starring: Kim Myung-min; Yum Jung-ah; Byun Hee-bong; Jung Gyu-woon; Yoo Hae-jin
- Cinematography: Kim Hak-soo
- Edited by: Kim Chang-ju
- Music by: Jo Yeong-wook
- Production company: Woollim
- Distributed by: Lotte Entertainment
- Release date: September 20, 2012
- Running time: 115 minutes
- Country: South Korea
- Language: Korean
- Box office: US$8.3 million

The Spies (Korean: 간첩; RR: Gancheop), also known as The Spy, is a 2012 South Korean action comedy film, starring Kim Myung-min, Yum Jung-ah, Byun Hee-bong, Jung Gyu-woon, Yoo Hae-jin and directed by Woo Min-ho. It is about North Korean undercover spies living mundane lives in South Korea. The film was released on September 20, 2012, and attracted 1,310,895 admissions nationwide.

== Plot ==
Section chief Kim (Kim Myung-min) was dispatched to South Korea 22 years ago to spy for the North Korean government. Now, spying is not his job anymore. In daily life, Kim makes a living by selling fake Viagra pills smuggled from China and returns home every night to his wife and two loving children.

When Kim unexpectedly receives an assassination order from his boss (Yoo Hae-jin), he gathers his teammates which consist of assistant manager Kang (Yum Jung-ah), a single mother and real estate agent, adviser Yoon (Byun Hee-bong), a retired senior citizen who specializes in making forged IDs, and assistant manager Woo (Jung Gyu-woon), a farmer whose expertise lies on hacking computers. Although these four people no longer want to be part of the assassination coup, they have no choice but to follow the order.

While performing a reconnaissance routine, Kim enters the residence of their target as a cable repairman and notices a large safe in one of the rooms. Later, he meets his fellow spies and devises a secondary plan to steal the safe's money. No one knows if they will actually be able to get hold of the money as they in turn have become the target of the South Korean government.

== Cast ==
- Kim Myung-min – Section chief Kim
- Yum Jung-ah – Assistant manager Kang
- Byun Hee-bong – Adviser Yoon
- Jung Gyu-woon – Assistant manager Woo
- Yoo Hae-jin – Department head Choi
- Jung Man-sik – NIS section chief
- Chun Bo-geun – Kim's son
- Oh Na-ra
- Kim Jin-hee
- Oh Kwang-rok – man on bench (cameo)
