= Baeksang Arts Award for Best Actor – Television =

Korean television award

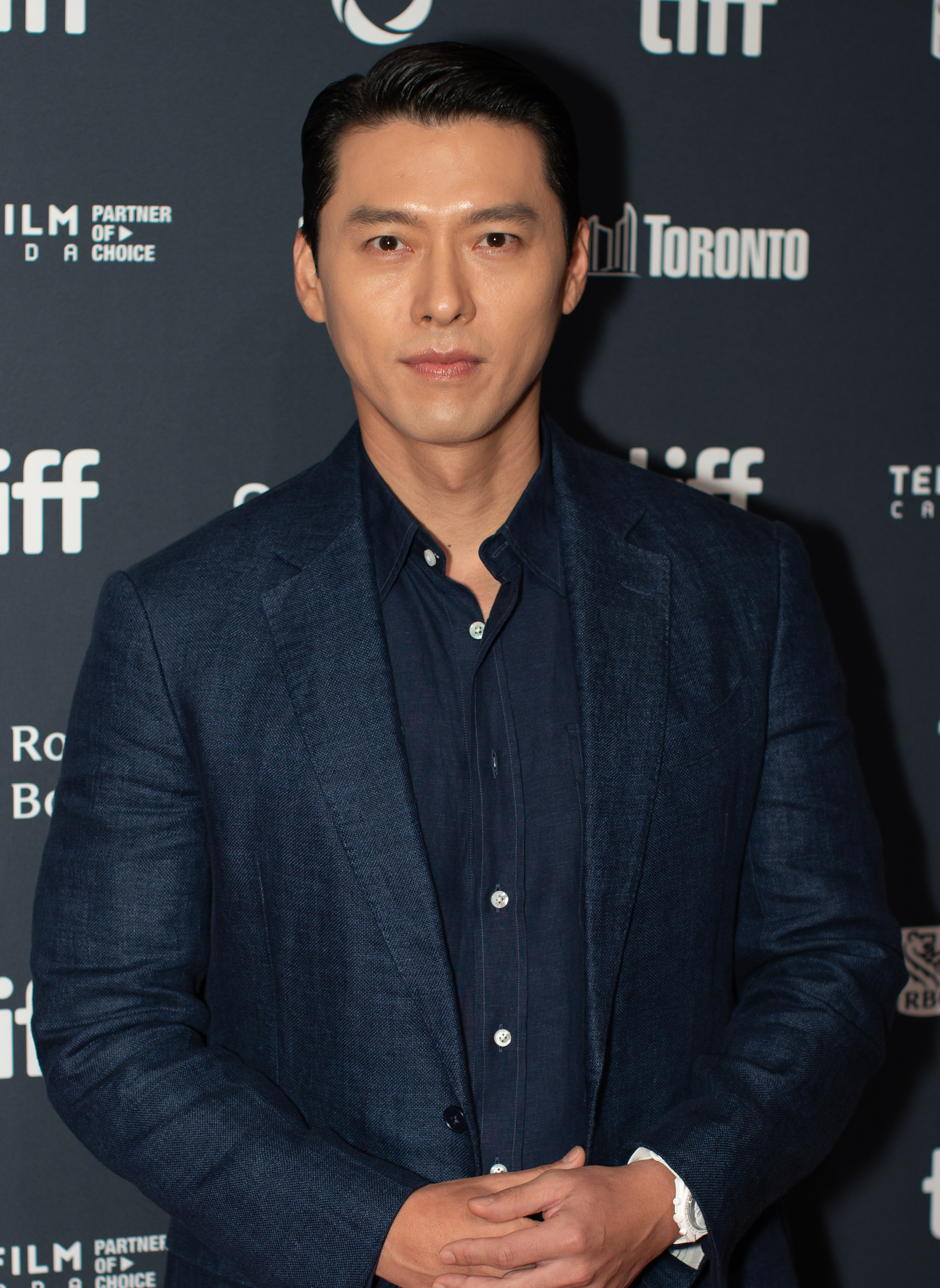
- 2026 recipient: Hyun Bin
- Awarded for: Best performance by an actor in a leading role in a South Korean series
- Country: South Korea
- Presented by: Baeksang Arts Awards
- Most recent winner: Hyun Bin; Made in Korea (2026)
- Website: baeksangartsawards

The Baeksang Arts Award for Best Actor – Television (Korean: 백상예술대상 TV부문 남자 최우수 연기상; RR: Baeksang Yesul Daesang TV Bumun Namja Choeusu Yeongisang) is an award presented annually at the Baeksang Arts Awards ceremony organised by Ilgan Sports and JTBC Plus, affiliates of JoongAng Ilbo, usually in the second quarter of each year in Seoul.

== Winners and nominees ==
Table key
‡	Indicates the winner

=== 1970s ===
Year	Winner	Television series	Original title	Role(s)	Network
1974 (10th)	Choi Bool-am ‡	Century	한백년		MBC
1975 (11th)	Moon Oh-jang ‡	Jochungnyeon	조총련		KBS
1976 (12th)	Shin Goo ‡	Another Home	타향		KBS
1976 (12th)	Kim Mu-saeng ‡	Tenacity	집념	Heo Jun	MBC
1977 (13th)	Han Jin-hee ‡	Daughter-in-Law	맏며느리		TBC
1977 (13th)	Kim Jin-hae ‡	The Dance of Lord Cheoyong	처용무		KBS
1978 (14th)	Choi Bool-am ‡	You	당신		MBC
1978 (14th)	Lee Nak-hoon ‡	The Celestial Nymph	천녀화		TBC
1979 (15th)	Lee Jung-gil ‡	Hot Hand	뜨거운 손	Han Ji-il	MBC

=== 1980s ===
Year	Winner	Television series	Original title	Role(s)	Network
1980 (16th)	Shin Goo ‡	Spring Blessing	입춘대길		KBS
1981 (17th)	Shin Goo ‡	Back in the Day	옛날 나 어릴 적에		KBS1
1981 (17th)	Jeon Woon ‡	The Last Stop	종점		MBC
1982 (18th)	Lee Jung-gil ‡	Nocturne	야상곡		MBC
1982 (18th)	Song Jae-ho ‡	The New Bride	새댁		KBS1
1983 (19th)	Lee Young-hoo ‡	The Great Rich: Lee Yongik	거부실록: 이용익		MBC
1984 (20th)	Im Dong-jin ‡	Foundation of the Kingdom	개국	King Taejo	KBS1
1985 (21st)	Kim In-moon ‡	Looking for the Truth	진실을 찾아서		KBS1
1986 (22nd)	Seo In-seok ‡	Lights and Shadows	빛과 그림자	Sung-gu	KBS2
1987 (23rd)	Yu In-chon ‡	Phoenix	불새	Young-hoo	MBC
1988 (24th)	Lee Young-hoo ‡	Nature	산하	Lee Jong-moon	MBC
1989 (25th)	Kim Yeong-cheol ‡	Two Sunsets	두 석양		KBS2

=== 1990s ===
Year	Winner	Television series	Original title	Role(s)	Network
1990 (26th)	Im Hyun-sik ‡	Three Families Under One Roof	한지붕 세가족	Choi Kyung-ho	MBC
1991 (27th)	Yu In-chon ‡	Ambitious Times	야망의 세월	Park Hyeong-seop	KBS2
1992 (28th)	Choi Jae-sung ‡	Eyes of Dawn	여명의 눈동자	Choi Dae-chi	MBC
1992 (28th)	Lee Nak-hoon ‡	Yesterday's Green Grass	옛날의 금잔디	Yoo In-seop	KBS1
1993 (29th)	Choi Min-soo ‡	Walking Up to Heaven	걸어서 하늘까지	Jung Jong-ho	MBC
1993 (29th)	Yu In-chon	Sunrise Peak	일출봉	Up san-yi	MBC
1993 (29th)	Choi Soo-jong	Jealousy	질투	Lee Young-ho	MBC
1993 (29th)	Seo In-seok	Samgukgi - The Chronicles of the Three Kingdoms	삼국기	Kim Yu-sin	KBS1
1993 (29th)	Lee Young-bum	The Chemistry Is Right	궁합이 맞습니다.	Ahn Eug-seok	SBS
1994 (30th)	Shin Goo ‡	Wild Chrysanthemum	들국화		KBS1
1994 (30th)	Park Joong-hoon	The Faraway River	머나먼 쏭바강	Hwang Il-cheon	SBS
1994 (30th)	Choi Soo-jong	Pilot	파일럿	Kang Min-ki	MBC
1994 (30th)	Dokgo Young-jae	My Mother's Sea	엄마의 바다	Choi Seung-joo	MBC
1995 (31st)	Choi Min-soo ‡	Sandglass	모래시계	Park Tae-soo	SBS
1995 (31st)	Park Sang-won	Sandglass	모래시계	Kang Woo-suk	SBS
1995 (31st)	Han Suk-kyu	The Moon of Seoul	서울의 달	Kim Hong-sik	MBC
1995 (31st)	Lee Jae-ryong	General Hospital	종합병원	Kim Do-hoon	MBC
1996 (32nd)	Lee Byung-hun ‡	Sons of the Wind	바람의 아들	Jang Hong-pyo	KBS2
1996 (32nd)	Lee Chang-hoon	Love and War	전쟁과 사랑	Kim Nam-cheon	MBC
1996 (32nd)	Kim Mu-saeng	Even if the Wind Blows	바람은 불어도	Hwang Jung-woon	KBS1
1996 (32nd)	Joo Hyun	Auntie Ok	옥이 이모	Uncle	SBS
1997 (33rd)	Yoo Dong-geun ‡	Lovers	애인	Jung Woon-oh	MBC
1997 (33rd)	Park Geun-hyung	The Brothers' River	형제의 강	Seo Bok-man	SBS
1997 (33rd)	Choi Soo-jong	First Love	첫사랑	Sung Chang-hyeok	KBS2
1997 (33rd)	Kim Min-jong	A Faraway Country	머나먼 나라	Kim Han-soo	KBS2
1998 (34th)	Yoo Dong-geun ‡	Tears of the Dragon	용의 눈물	Yi Bang-won	KBS1
1998 (34th)	Kim Mu-saeng	Tears of the Dragon	용의 눈물	King Taejo	KBS1
1998 (34th)	Choi Bool-am	You and I	그대 그리고 나	Park Jae-chul	MBC
1998 (34th)	Lee Soon-jae	Palace of Dreams	꿈의 궁전	Ji Won-ho	SBS
1999 (35th)	Choi Soo-jong ‡	Legendary Ambition	야망의 전설	Lee Jung-tae	KBS2
1999 (35th)	Ahn Jae-wook	Sunflower	해바라기	Dr. Jang Hyun-woo	MBC
1999 (35th)	Im Dong-jin	The King and the Queen	왕과 비	Grand Prince Suyang, later King Sejo	KBS1
1999 (35th)	Kim Min-jong	Mister Q	미스터 큐	Lee Kang-to	SBS

=== 2000s ===
Year	Winner and nominees	Television series	Original title	Role(s)	Network
2000 (36th)	Cha In-pyo ‡	Street King	왕초	Kim Choon-sam	MBC
2000 (36th)	Kang Nam-gil	Last War	마지막 전쟁	Kim Tae-kyung	MBC
2000 (36th)	Lee Byung-hun	Happy Together	해피 투게더	Seo Tae-poong	SBS
2000 (36th)	Kim Kap-soo	Sad Temptation	슬픈 유혹	Jung Moon-gi	KBS2
2001 (37th)	Kim Yeong-cheol ‡	Taejo Wang Geon	태조 왕건	Gung Ye	KBS1
2001 (37th)	Kang Seok-woo	Ajumma	아줌마	Jang Jin-gu	MBC
2001 (37th)	Cha In-pyo	Fireworks	불꽃	Choi Jong-hyuk	SBS
2002 (38th)	Yoo Dong-geun ‡	Empress Myeongseong	명성황후	Heungseon Daewongun	KBS2
2002 (38th)	Lee Byung-hun	Beautiful Days	아름다운 날들	Lee Min-chul	SBS
2002 (38th)	Cho Jae-hyun	Piano	피아노	Han Eok-kuan	SBS
2002 (38th)	Seo In-seok	Taejo Wang Geon	태조 왕건	Kyon Hwon	KBS1
2003 (39th)	Lee Byung-hun ‡	All In	올인	Kim In-ha	SBS
2003 (39th)	Kim Sang-joong	The Dawn of the Empire	제국의 아침	King Gwangjong	KBS2
2003 (39th)	Ahn Jae-mo	Rustic Period	야인시대	Kim Du-han	SBS
2003 (39th)	Cho Jae-hyun	Snowman	눈사람	Han Pil-seung	MBC
2004 (40th)	Zo In-sung ‡	Something Happened in Bali	발리에서 생긴 일	Jung Jae-min	SBS
2004 (40th)	Cha Seung-won	Bodyguard	보디가드	Hong Kyung-tak	KBS2
2004 (40th)	Lee Seo-jin	Damo	조선 여형사 다모	Hwangbo Yoon	MBC
2004 (40th)	Kim Rae-won	Cats on the Roof	옥탑방 고양이	Lee Kyung-min	MBC
2005 (41st)	So Ji-sub ‡	I'm Sorry, I Love You	미안하다, 사랑한다	Cha Moo-hyuk	KBS
2005 (41st)	Kim Myung-min	Immortal Admiral Yi Sun-sin	불멸의 이순신	Yi Sun-sin	KBS1
2005 (41st)	Park Shin-yang	Lovers in Paris	파리의 연인	Han Ki-joo	SBS
2006 (42nd)	Kim Joo-hyuk ‡	Lovers in Prague	프라하의 연인	Choi Sang-hyun	SBS
2006 (42nd)	Son Hyun-joo	My Rosy Life	장밋빛 인생	Ban Sung-moon	KBS2
2006 (42nd)	Uhm Tae-woong	Resurrection	부활	Seo Ha-eun / Yoo Shin-hyuk	KBS2
2007 (43rd)	Kim Myung-min ‡	Behind the White Tower	하얀 거탑	Jang Joon-hyuk	MBC
2007 (43rd)	Hyun Bin	The Snow Queen	눈의 여왕	Han Tae-woong / Han Deuk-gu	KBS2
2007 (43rd)	Lee Beom-soo	Surgeon Bong Dal-hee	외과의사 봉달희	Ahn Joong-geun	SBS
2007 (43rd)	Ryu Soo-young	Seoul 1945	서울 1945	Choi Woon-hyuk	KBS1
2007 (43rd)	Song Il-kook	Jumong	주몽	Jumong	MBC
2008 (44th)	Park Shin-yang ‡	War of Money	쩐의 전쟁	Geum Na-ra	SBS
2008 (44th)	Bae Yong-joon	The Legend	태왕사신기	Gwanggaeto the Great	MBC
2008 (44th)	Cho Jae-hyun	New Heart	뉴하트	Choi Kang-gook	MBC
2008 (44th)	Kang Ji-hwan	Capital Scandal	경성 스캔들	Sunwoo Wan	KBS2
2008 (44th)	Lee Seo-jin	Lee San, Wind of the Palace	이산	Yi San	MBC
2009 (45th)	Kim Myung-min ‡	Beethoven Virus	베토벤 바이러스	Kang Gun-woo / Kang Mae	MBC
2009 (45th)	Lee Joon-gi	Iljimae	일지매	Lee Gyeom / Yong-i / Iljimae	SBS
2009 (45th)	Park Yong-ha	On Air	온에어	Lee Kyung-min	SBS
2009 (45th)	Song Il-kook	The Kingdom of the Winds	바람의 나라	Prince Muhyul	KBS2
2009 (45th)	Song Seung-heon	East of Eden	에덴의 동쪽	Lee Dong-chul	MBC

=== 2010s ===
Year	Winner and nominees	Television series	Original title	Role(s)	Network
2010 (46th)	Lee Byung-hun ‡	Iris	아이리스	Kim Hyun-jun	KBS2
2010 (46th)	Jang Hyuk	The Slave Hunters	추노	Lee Dae-gil	KBS2
2010 (46th)	Kim Soo-ro	Master of Study	공부의 신	Kang Suk-ho	KBS2
2010 (46th)	So Ji-sub	Cain and Abel	카인과 아벨	Lee Cho-in / Oh Kang-ho	SBS
2010 (46th)	Yoon Sang-hyun	Queen of Housewives	내조의 여왕	Heo Tae-joon	MBC
2011 (47th)	Jeong Bo-seok ‡	Giant	자이언트	Jo Pil-yeon	SBS
2011 (47th)	Hyun Bin	Secret Garden	시크릿 가든	Kim Joo-won	SBS
2011 (47th)	Kwon Sang-woo	Big Thing	대물	Ha Do-ya	SBS
2011 (47th)	Lee Beom-soo	Giant	자이언트	Lee Kang-mo	SBS
2011 (47th)	Yoon Shi-yoon	Bread, Love and Dreams	제빵왕 김탁구	Kim Tak-gu	KBS2
2012 (48th)	Kim Soo-hyun ‡	Moon Embracing the Sun	해를 품은 달	Lee Hwon	MBC
2012 (48th)	Cha Seung-won	The Greatest Love	최고의 사랑	Dokko Jin	MBC
2012 (48th)	Han Suk-kyu	Deep Rooted Tree	뿌리 깊은 나무	Sejong the Great	SBS
2012 (48th)	Park Si-hoo	The Princess' Man	공주의 남자	Kim Seung-yoo	KBS2
2012 (48th)	Shin Ha-kyun	Brain	브레인	Lee Kang-hoon	KBS2
2013 (49th)	Son Hyun-joo ‡	The Chaser	추적자	Baek Hong-suk	SBS
2013 (49th)	Lee Sang-yoon	Seoyoung, My Daughter	내 딸 서영이	Kang Woo-jae	KBS2
2013 (49th)	Lee Sung-min	Golden Time	골든타임	Choi In-hyuk	MBC
2013 (49th)	Uhm Tae-woong	Man from the Equator	적도의 남자	Kim Sun-woo	KBS2
2013 (49th)	Yoo Jun-sang	My Husband Got a Family	넝쿨째 굴러온 당신	Terry Kang / Bang Gwi-nam	KBS2
2014 (50th)	Cho Jae-hyun ‡	Jeong Do-jeon	정도전	Jeong Do-jeon	KBS1
2014 (50th)	Joo Won	Good Doctor	굿 닥터	Park Shi-on	KBS2
2014 (50th)	Kim Soo-hyun	My Love from the Star	별에서 온 그대	Do Min-joon	SBS
2014 (50th)	Lee Jong-suk	I Can Hear Your Voice	너의 목소리가 들려	Park Soo-ha	SBS
2014 (50th)	Yoo Ah-in	Secret Love Affair	밀회	Lee Sun-jae	JTBC
2015 (51st)	Lee Sung-min ‡	Misaeng: Incomplete Life	미생	Oh Sang-shik	tvN
2015 (51st)	Cho Jae-hyun	Punch	펀치	Lee Tae-joon	SBS
2015 (51st)	Kim Rae-won	Punch	펀치	Park Jung-hwan	SBS
2015 (51st)	Ji Sung	Kill Me, Heal Me	킬미, 힐미	Cha Do-hyun / Shin Se-gi / Perry Park / Ahn Yo-seob / Ahn Yo-na / Nana / Mr. X	MBC
2015 (51st)	Zo In-sung	It's Okay, That's Love	괜찮아, 사랑이야	Jang Jae-yeol	SBS
2016 (52nd)	Yoo Ah-in ‡	Six Flying Dragons	육룡이 나르샤	Yi Bang-won	SBS
2016 (52nd)	Cho Jin-woong	Signal	시그널	Lee Jae-han	tvN
2016 (52nd)	Joo Won	Yong-pal	용팔이	Kim Tae-hyun	SBS
2016 (52nd)	Namkoong Min	Remember	리멤버 – 아들의 전쟁	Nam Gyu-man	SBS
2016 (52nd)	Song Joong-ki	Descendants of the Sun	태양의 후예	Yoo Si-jin	KBS2
2017 (53rd)	Gong Yoo ‡	Guardian: The Lonely and Great God	쓸쓸하고 찬란하神 – 도깨비	Kim Shin	tvN
2017 (53rd)	Han Suk-kyu	Dr. Romantic	낭만닥터 김사부	Kim Sa-bu / Boo Yong-joo	SBS
2017 (53rd)	Jo Jung-suk	Don't Dare to Dream	질투의 화신	Lee Hwa-shin	SBS
2017 (53rd)	Namkoong Min	Good Manager	김과장	Kim Sung-ryong	KBS2
2017 (53rd)	Park Bo-gum	Love in the Moonlight	구르미 그린 달빛	Lee Yeong	KBS2
2018 (54th)	Cho Seung-woo ‡	Stranger	비밀의 숲	Hwang Shi-mok	tvN
2018 (54th)	Chun Ho-jin	My Golden Life	황금빛 내 인생	Seo Tae-soo	KBS2
2018 (54th)	Jang Hyuk	Money Flower	돈꽃	Kang Pil-joo / Jang Eun-cheon / Jo In-ho	MBC
2018 (54th)	Kim Sang-joong	The Rebel	역적: 백성을 훔친 도적	Hong Ah-mo-gae	MBC
2018 (54th)	Park Seo-joon	Fight for My Way	쌈 마이웨이	Ko Dong-man	KBS2
2019 (55th)	Lee Byung-hun ‡	Mr. Sunshine	미스터 션샤인	Choi Yoo-jin / Eugene Choi	tvN
2019 (55th)	Hyun Bin	Memories of the Alhambra	알함브라 궁전의 추억	Yoo Jin-woo	tvN
2019 (55th)	Kim Nam-gil	The Fiery Priest	열혈사제	Kim Hae-il	SBS
2019 (55th)	Lee Sun-kyun	My Mister	나의 아저씨	Park Dong-hoon	tvN
2019 (55th)	Yeo Jin-goo	The Crowned Clown	왕이 된 남자	Ha-seon / Yi Heon	tvN

=== 2020s ===
Year	Winner and nominees	Television series	Original title	Role(s)	Network
2020 (56th)	Kang Ha-neul ‡	When the Camellia Blooms	동백꽃 필 무렵	Hwang Yong-sik	KBS2
2020 (56th)	Hyun Bin	Crash Landing on You	사랑의 불시착	Ri Jeong-hyeok	tvN
2020 (56th)	Ju Ji-hoon	Hyena	하이에나	Yoon Hee-jae	SBS
2020 (56th)	Namkoong Min	Hot Stove League	스토브리그	Baek Seung-soo	SBS
2020 (56th)	Park Seo-joon	Itaewon Class	이태원 클라쓰	Park Sae-ro-yi	JTBC
2021 (57th)	Shin Ha-kyun ‡	Beyond Evil	괴물	Lee Dong-sik	JTBC
2021 (57th)	Kim Soo-hyun	It's Okay to Not Be Okay	사이코지만 괜찮아	Moon Gang-tae	tvN
2021 (57th)	Song Joong-ki	Vincenzo	빈센조	Vincenzo Cassano	tvN
2021 (57th)	Um Ki-joon	The Penthouse: War in Life	펜트하우스	Joo Dan-tae / Mr Baek	SBS
2021 (57th)	Lee Joon-gi	Flower of Evil	악의 꽃	Baek Hee-sung / Do Hyun-soo	tvN
2022 (58th)	Lee Jun-ho ‡	The Red Sleeve	옷소매 붉은 끝동	Yi San	MBC
2022 (58th)	Kim Nam-gil	Through the Darkness	악의 마음을 읽는 자들	Song Ha-young	SBS
2022 (58th)	Lee Jung-jae	Squid Game	오징어 게임	Seong Gi-hun	Netflix
2022 (58th)	Yim Si-wan	Tracer	트레이서	Hwang Dong-joo	MBC, Wavve
2022 (58th)	Jung Hae-in	D.P.	디피	Ahn Joon-ho	Netflix
2023 (59th)	Lee Sung-min ‡	Reborn Rich	재벌집 막내아들	Jin Yang-chul	JTBC
2023 (59th)	Son Suk-ku	My Liberation Notes	나의 해방일지	Gu Ja-gyeong	JTBC
2023 (59th)	Lee Byung-hun	Our Blues	우리들의 블루스	Lee Dong-seok	tvN
2023 (59th)	Jung Kyung-ho	Crash Course in Romance	일타 스캔들	Choi Chi-yeol	tvN
2023 (59th)	Choi Min-sik	Big Bet	카지노	Cha Mu-sik	Disney+
2024 (60th)	Namkoong Min ‡	My Dearest	연인	Lee Jang-hyun	MBC
2024 (60th)	Kim Soo-hyun	Queen of Tears	눈물의 여왕	Baek Hyun-woo	tvN
2024 (60th)	Ryu Seung-ryong	Moving	무빙	Jang Ju-won	Disney+
2024 (60th)	Yoo Yeon-seok	A Bloody Lucky Day	운수 오진 날	Geum Hyeok-soo	TVING, tvN
2024 (60th)	Yim Si-wan	Boyhood	소년시대	Jang Byeong-tae	Coupang Play
2025 (61st)	Ju Ji-hoon ‡	The Trauma Code: Heroes on Call	중증외상센터	Baek Kang-hyuk	Netflix
2025 (61st)	Park Bo-gum	When Life Gives You Tangerines	폭싹 속았수다	Yang Guan-sik	Netflix
2025 (61st)	Byeon Woo-seok	Lovely Runner	선재업고 튀어	Ryu Sun-jae	tvN
2025 (61st)	Lee Joon-hyuk	Dongjae, the Good or the Bastard	좋거나 나쁜 동재	Seo Dong-jae	TVING, tvN
2025 (61st)	Han Suk-kyu	Doubt	이토록 친밀한 배신자	Jang Tae-su	MBC
2026 (62nd)	Hyun Bin ‡	Made in Korea	메이드인코리아	Baek Ki-tae	Disney+
2026 (62nd)	Ryu Seung-ryong	The Dream Life of Mr. Kim	서울 자가에 대기업 다니는 김 부장 이야기	Kim Nak-soo	JTBC
2026 (62nd)	Park Jin-young	Our Unwritten Seoul	미지의 서울	Lee Ho-soo	tvN
2026 (62nd)	Lee Jun-ho	Typhoon Family	태풍상사	Kang Tae-poong	tvN
2026 (62nd)	Ji Sung	The Judge Returns	판사 이한영	Lee Han-young	MBC

== Multiple awards and nominations ==
The following individuals received two or more Best Actor awards:

Wins	Actor
4	Lee Byung-hun
4	Shin Goo
3	Yoo Dong-geun
2	Choi Bool-am
2	Choi Min-soo
2	Kim Myung-min
2	Lee Sung-min

The following individuals received four or more Best Actor nominations:

Nominations	Actor
7	Lee Byung-hun
5	Cho Jae-hyun
5	Hyun Bin
4	Choi Soo-jong
4	Han Suk-kyu
4	Kim Soo-hyun
4	Namkoong Min
4	Shin Goo

== Sources ==
- "Baeksang Arts Awards Nominees and Winners Lists". Naver Movie (in Korean).
- "Baeksang Arts Awards Winners Lists". Baeksang Arts Awards (in Korean).
