= Hyun Bin =

South Korean actor (born 1982)

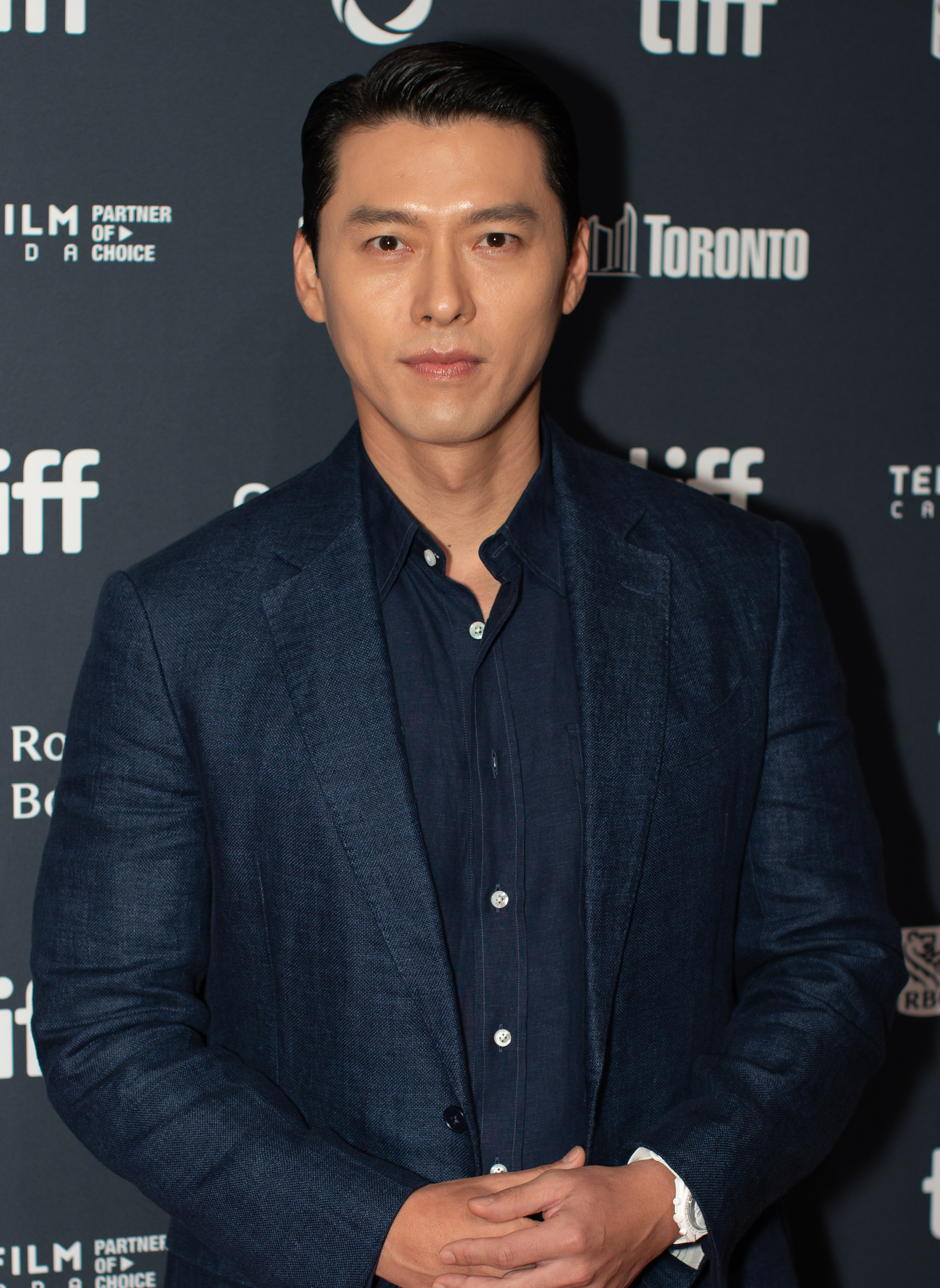
- Hyun at the 2024 Toronto International Film Festival
- Born: Kim Tae-pyung; September 25, 1982 (age 44); Seoul, South Korea
- Education: Chung-Ang University (M.A. in Theater and Film)
- Occupation: Actor
- Years active: 2003–present
- Agent: VAST Entertainment
- Height: 185 cm (6 ft 1 in)
- Spouse: Son Ye-jin (m. 2022)
- Children: 1

Korean name
- Hangul: 김태평
- Hanja: 金泰坪
- RR: Gim Taepyeong
- MR: Kim T'aep'yŏng

Stage name
- Hangul: 현빈
- Hanja: 玄彬
- RR: Hyeon Bin
- MR: Hyŏn Pin
- Website: vastenm.com

Signature
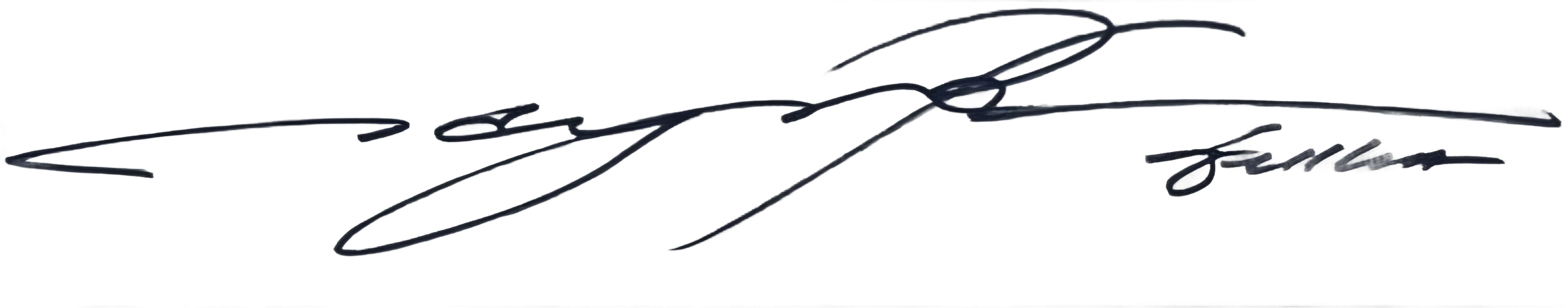

Kim Tae-pyung (Korean: 김태평; born September 25, 1982), better known by his stage name Hyun Bin (현빈), is a South Korean actor. Hyun gained recognition for the romantic comedy My Lovely Sam Soon (2005). His other notable works include television series Secret Garden (2010–2011), Memories of the Alhambra (2018–2019), Crash Landing on You (2019–2020); films The Fatal Encounter (2014), Confidential Assignment (2017) and its 2022 sequel, and The Swindlers (2017). Hyun won the Grand Prize for Television at the 47th Baeksang Arts Awards and the Blue Dragon Film Award for Best Actor in 2025. He was named Gallup Korea's Television Actor of the Year in 2011.

== Career ==
=== 2003–2007: Career beginnings and rise to stardom ===
Hyun's first film was Shower in 2002. However, filming was stopped and was not released due to lack of proper funding. He eventually made his debut as an actor in the 2003 television series Bodyguard. He then starred in the sitcom Nonstop 4 and quirky romance drama Ireland, and made his film debut the same year in the youth sports film Spin Kick.

Hyun shot to stardom with the 2005 romantic comedy My Lovely Sam Soon with Kim Sun-a, for which Hyun won the Top Excellence Award at the MBC Drama Awards. My Lovely Sam Soon was a massive hit with average viewership ratings of over 37% and recorded 50.5% for the finale, making it one of the highest-rated Korean drama of all time. The high level popularity of the drama and his portrayal as Sam-sik established Hyun Bin as a top star in South Korea and a Hallyu star as his popularity expanded beyond South Korea to Japan and other countries in Asia.

Hyun starred in a lead role in his first film A Millionaire's First Love, written by internet novelist Guiyeoni. The film was a hit with young audiences. Hyun's next television project was The Snow Queen, although the series underperformed, it earned him his first Best Actor nomination at the Baeksang Arts Awards.

=== 2008–2011: New career challenges and Secret Garden ===
To expand his acting profile, Hyun started to choose more eclectic projects. In 2008, he acted in director Yoon Jong-chan's film I Am Happy, playing as Man-soo, a man who suffered from mental illness. The film was selected to screen at the 13th Busan International Film Festival in 2008, but it was not released in theatres until late 2009. He later returned to television with Worlds Within, which was well-received for Noh Hee-kyung's writing. He was praised for his nuanced acting in the drama series. In 2009, Hyun drew critical acclaim with his portrayal as a sociopath in the gangster saga Friend, Our Legend. To prepare for his role, he reportedly watched Kwak Kyung-taek's original film 20 to 30 times.

In 2010, Hyun starred in Secret Garden, a romantic fantasy drama written by Kim Eun-sook. The drama recorded a high viewership rating of 35%, and gained enormous popularity both domestically and internationally for its fashion, catchphrases and music. His portrayal as Kim Joo-won created a "Hyun Bin Syndrome" as his name and face were plastered everywhere, from newspapers to television and the internet. Hyun was recognized at the 2010 SBS Drama Awards and the 47th Baeksang Arts Awards for his stellar performance. He also contributed to the soundtrack of the drama with "That Man", which peaked at number one in eight Korean music portals.

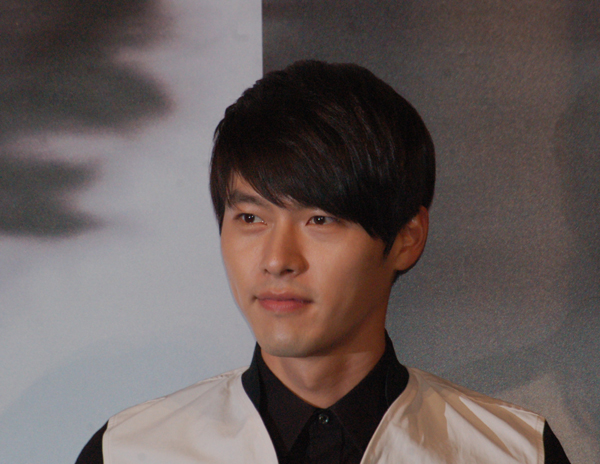
Hyun in February 2011

In 2011, Hyun appeared in two films that were released back to back; Come Rain, Come Shine, a minimalist breakup indie directed by Lee Yoon-ki, and Late Autumn directed by Kim Tae-yong. Shot in Seattle city, Late Autumn is an English-language remake of the 1966 Lee Man-hee classic, in which Hyun played a man on the run who falls in love with a woman who is on special leave from prison. It was the highest-grossing Korean film released in China to date, taking in more than US$9.5 million over two weeks, which was unprecedented for a melodrama. He received a good review from The Hollywood Reporter which stated, "it is Hyun who impresses more for not underplaying the dandy, narcissistic side of his personality." Hyun walked the red carpet at the 61st Berlin International Film Festival, where the two films were both selected to be screened. He described the honor as his "most happiest achievement".

=== 2011–2012: Military enlistment and discharge ===
On March 7, 2011, Hyun began his 21-month mandatory military service as a soldier in the Marine Corps. He volunteered to serve in the Marine Corps, said to be the toughest branch of the Korean military, as he had a good impression of the Marines. Competition rate to enter the Marines at that time was high at 4:1 with Hyun placing in the top 5% of applicants. Hyun applied to be a combat soldier. The decision to join the Marines while at the peak of his career generated much interest in Korea and overseas. Seven broadcasting companies, including Japan's NHK, requested access to the training camp. Hyun was named a top marksman during training, one of 16 out of about 720 rookie Marines. Hyun hit the target 19 times out of 20 in day shooting training, and all of his 10 shots hit the target during night training. To qualify as a top marksman, rookies must hit the target more than 18 times out of 20 in day training and nine out of 10 at night.

The Corps originally planned to put Hyun on public relations duty; however due to public criticism and Hyun's reported desire to serve on the front line, Hyun was assigned on active duty to the island Baengnyeongdo, close to the Northern Limit Line and Yeonpyeong, site of a November 2010 artillery engagement between the North and South Korean forces.

After joining the Marines and completing his six months in the service, Hyun participated in the "Seoul Reclamation Anniversary Marine Marathon Competition". He ran a 6.25 km long course with 400 exemplary senior marines. This event was held in remembrance of the historically significant event when the Marines won back the capital Seoul that had been taken during the 6.25 Korean War.

He was discharged on December 6, 2012, and was awarded the Secretary of Defense Award and the Marine Corps Commandant Commendation for being an exemplary soldier. After the merger of their former agency AM Entertainment with SM Entertainment, Hyun's reps announced in November 2012 that the actor and Shin Min-ah had decided to go independent and set up their own management agency O& Entertainment.

=== 2013–2016: Comeback to entertainment industry ===
Hyun spent most of 2013 shooting ad commercials as an in-demand product endorser, and holding fan meetings all over Asia. For his acting comeback after military service, Hyun chose The Fatal Encounter, his first period film, in which he played the lead role of King Jeongjo who faced fierce party strife and assassination attempts during his reign. It was released in April 2014 and drew more than three million admissions. However, Hyun was criticized for his flat tonation and lack of emotions in the film, which received mostly negative reviews.

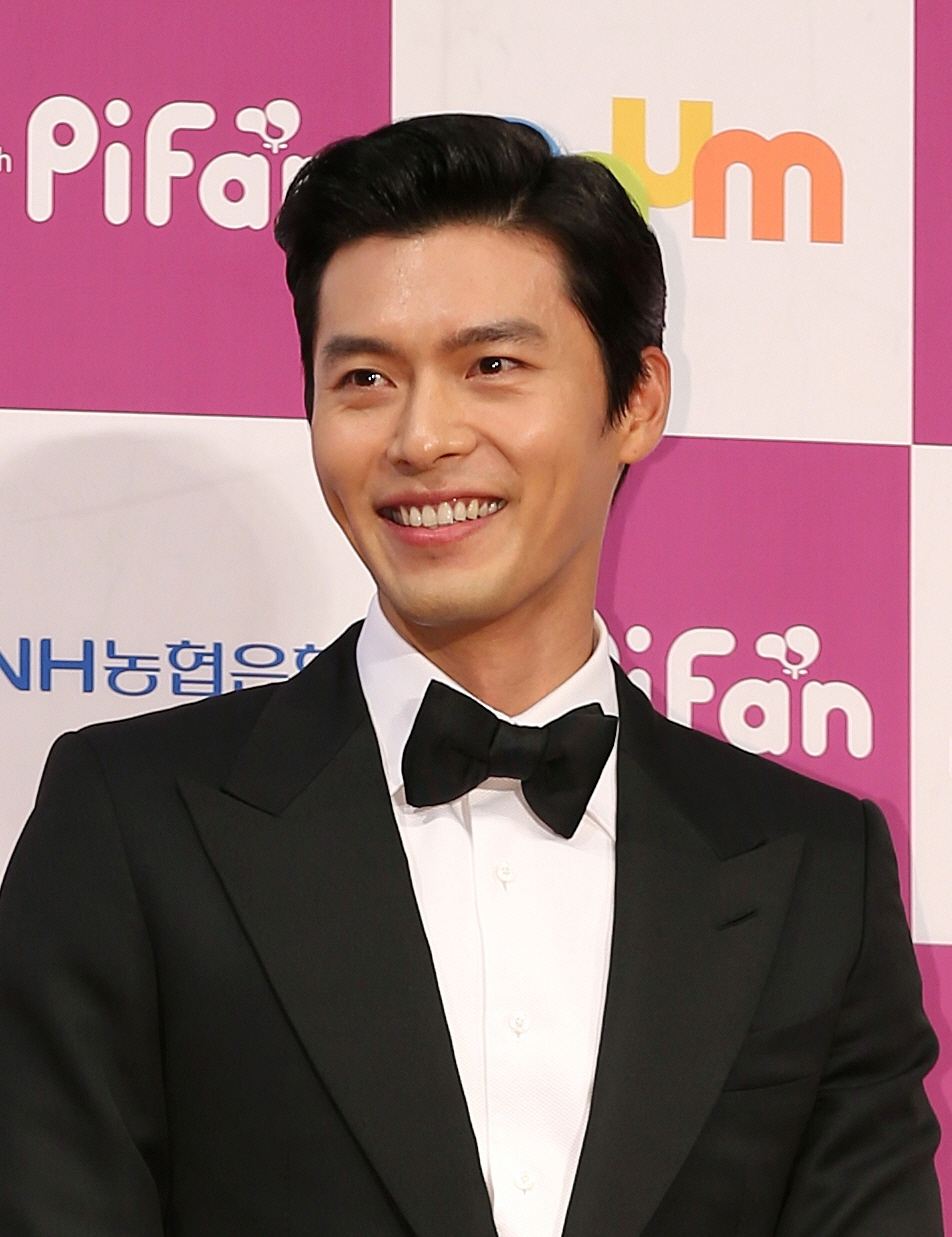
Hyun during 2014 Bucheon International Fantastic Film Festival

In 2015, Hyun made a comeback in the Korean drama scene after four years, via romantic comedy Hyde Jekyll, Me. In the drama inspired by the literary character, he played a man with split personality disorder whose two personas both fall for the same woman. In January 2016, he set up his own agency, VAST Entertainment, a wholly owned subsidiary of Kakao M.

=== 2017–present: Career resurgence ===
Hyun returned to big screen with action-thriller film Confidential Assignment (2017), where he played the role of a North Korean detective who was secretly sent to South Korea to apprehend a crime ring made up of North Korean traitors. The film was a success, and Hyun received positive reviews from critics for his action scenes and comedic performance. He then starred in a blockbuster crime action film The Swindlers, along with Yoo Ji-tae, about a prosecutor who plans to catch a con man who has swindled a large sum of money.

In 2018, Hyun played his first villain role in crime thriller The Negotiation, alongside Son Ye-jin; and zombie blockbuster Rampant, co-produced by VAST Entertainment. The same year, he returned to the small screen with fantasy suspense drama Memories of the Alhambra with Park Shin-hye. The series is one of highest rated Korean drama in cable television history, and Hyun was praised for his seemingly indifferent but humorous depiction of his character.

In 2019, Hyun played the role of a North Korean army captain in the romance drama Crash Landing on You, reuniting with The Negotiation co-star Son Ye-jin. The drama was a huge success and is the fifth highest-rated Korean drama in cable television history, and Hyun was praised for his versatile range of emotions and acting skills. For his portrayal as Captain Ri Jeong Hyuk, a North Korean elite army officer, Hyun won Grand Prize at the APAN Star Awards. In the 2023 action thriller film The Point Men, directed by Yim Soon-rye, Hyun starred as an NIS agent.

== Philanthropy ==
On October 29, 2013, Hyun received the President's award at the 50th Savings Day held by the Financial Services Committee, for saving 35 billion won (approximately US$33 million) within 17 years. In February 2016, he was involved in an awareness campaign against animal cruelty. As part of the project, Hyun's agency VAST Entertainment released pictures of him posing with a retired search and rescue dog named "Vision".

In March 2020, Hyun made a secret donation of 200 million won to the non-profit organization, Community Chest of Korea, to help fight against the COVID-19 outbreak on February 21, 2020. Hyun was also included as a member in the "Honor Society", a group of major private donors, for his many donations to different causes. He has continually supported projects by organizations such as Save the Children, Community Chest of Korea and international relief NGOs.

On March 8, 2022, Hyun made a donation ₩200 million to the Hope Bridge Disaster Relief Association, together with Son Ye-jin, to help those who have been damaged by the massive wildfire that started in Uljin, Gyeongbuk and has continued to spread Samcheok, Gangwon.

== Personal life ==
Hyun was born and raised in Seoul and has one elder brother. He graduated from Youngdong High School and studied at Chung-Ang University, where he majored in Theater Studies in 2004. In 2009, he enrolled at the same university and obtained a Master's degree.

=== Relationship and marriage ===
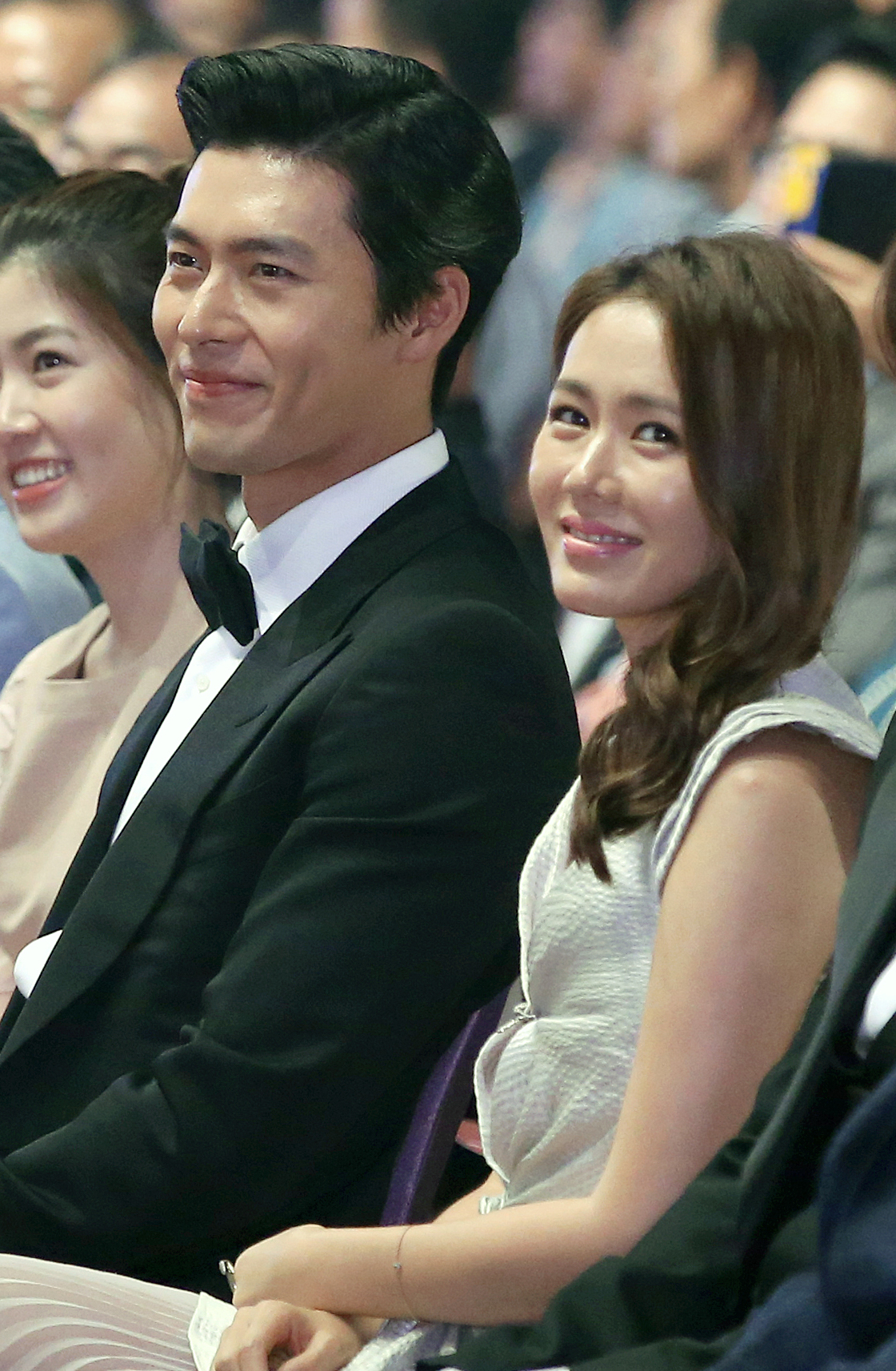
Hyun with Son Ye-jin

On January 1, 2021, Hyun's agency confirmed that he had been in a relationship with actress Son Ye-jin, his co-star in The Negotiation and Crash Landing on You. They began dating in 2020.

On February 10, 2022, Hyun and Son announced their engagement in letters posted on their social media accounts. They married in a private ceremony on March 31, 2022, attended by their families and close friends. On June 27, 2022, Son announced that she was pregnant with the couple's first child, and she gave birth to a son, named Kim Woo-Jin on November 27, 2022.

== Filmography ==
=== Film ===
Year	Title		Role	Notes	Ref.
Year	English	Korean	Role	Notes	Ref.
2002	Shower	샤워	Hong-kyu	Unreleased	
2004	Spin Kick	돌려차기	Lee Min-gyu		
2005	Daddy Long Legs	키다리 아저씨	Hyung-joon	Cameo	
2006	A Millionaire's First Love	백만장자의 첫사랑	Kang Jae-kyung		
2009	I Am Happy	나는 행복합니다	Jo Man-soo		
2011	Late Autumn	만추	Hoon		
2011	Come Rain, Come Shine	사랑한다, 사랑하지 않는다	Hwang Ji-seok		
2011	Tears of Africa	아프리카의 눈물	Narrator	Documentary	
2014	The Fatal Encounter	역린	King Jeongjo		
2017	Confidential Assignment	공조	Im Cheol-ryung		
2017	The Swindlers	꾼	Hwang Ji-sung		
2018	The Negotiation	협상	Min Tae-gu		
2018	Rampant	창궐	Lee Chung		
2022	Confidential Assignment 2: International	공조2:인터네셔날	Im Cheol-ryung		
2023	The Point Men	교섭	Park Dae-sik		
2024	Harbin	하얼빈	An Jung-geun		

=== Television series ===
Year	Title		Role	Notes	Ref.
Year	English	Korean	Role	Notes	Ref.
2003	Bodyguard	보디가드	Stalker	Extra	
2004	Nonstop 4	논스톱 4	Himself		
2004	Ireland	아일랜드	Kang Gook		
2005	My Lovely Sam Soon	내 이름은 김삼순	Hyun Jin-heon		
2005	Nonstop 5	논스톱 5	Himself	Cameo	
2006–2007	The Snow Queen	눈의 여왕	Han Tae-woong / Han Deuk-gu		
2008	Worlds Within	그들이 사는 세상	Jung Ji-oh		
2009	Friend, Our Legend	친구, 우리들의 전설	Han Dong-soo		
2010–2011	Secret Garden	시크릿 가든	Kim Joo-won		
2015	Hyde Jekyll, Me	하이드 지킬, 나	Gu Seo-jin / Robin		
2018–2019	Memories of the Alhambra	알함브라 궁전의 추억	Yoo Jin-woo		
2019–2020	Crash Landing on You	사랑의 불시착	Ri Jeong-hyeok		
2025–2026	Made in Korea	메이드 인 코리아	Baek Ki-tae		

=== Television shows ===
Year	Title	Role	Ref.
2010–2011	Tears of Africa	Narrator	
2012	Tears of the Earth - from the North Pole to the South Pole	Narrator	

=== Music video appearances ===
Year	Song Title	Artist	Ref.
2003	"내탓이죠"	Herb	
2005	"Memory"	Kim Bum-soo	
2005	"Hey U"	Lemon Tree	
2018	"Reply"	Kim Dong-ryool	
2024	"The World of You"	Kim Bum-soo	

== Discography ==
Title	Year	Peak chart positions	Sales	Album
Title	Year	KOR	Sales	Album
"That Man" (그남자)	2011	1	KOR: 2,129,278	Secret Garden OST
"Can't Have You" (가질 수 없는 너)	2011	6	KOR: 923,888	Non-album single

== Ambassadorship ==
Year	Event	Ref.
2009	Pink Ribbon Love Marathon Ambassador	
2011	PR Ambassador of Hyundai Motors' "Hyundai Grandeur"	
2013	PR Ambassador of Kia Motors' "The New K5"	
2014	Promotional Ambassador of Incheon Asian Games	
2016	Promotional Ambassador of Gwangju Biennale	

== Accolades ==
=== Awards and nominations ===
Name of the award ceremony, year presented, category, nominee of the award, and the result of the nomination
Award ceremony	Year	Category	Nominee / Work	Result	Ref.
APAN Star Awards	2021	Grand Prize (Daesang)	Crash Landing on You	Won	
Baeksang Arts Awards	2005	Best New Actor – Television	Ireland	Nominated	
Baeksang Arts Awards	2006	Most Popular Actor – Film	A Millionaire's First Love	Won	
Baeksang Arts Awards	2007	Best Actor – Television	The Snow Queen	Nominated	
Baeksang Arts Awards	2011	Best Actor – Television	Secret Garden	Nominated	
Baeksang Arts Awards	2011	Grand Prize (Daesang) – Television	Secret Garden	Won	
Baeksang Arts Awards	2019	Best Actor – Television	Memories of the Alhambra	Nominated	
Baeksang Arts Awards	2020	Best Actor – Television	Crash Landing on You	Nominated	
Baeksang Arts Awards	2020	Most Popular Actor	Crash Landing on You	Won	
Baeksang Arts Awards	2025	Best Actor – Film	Harbin	Nominated	
Baeksang Arts Awards	2026	Best Actor – Television	Made in Korea	Won	
Blue Dragon Film Awards	2025	Best Actor	Harbin	Won	
Blue Dragon Film Awards	2025	Popular Star Award	Harbin	Won	
Buil Film Awards	2025	Best Actor	Harbin	Nominated	
Director's Cut Awards	2026	Best Actor in a Series	Made in Korea	Won	
Global OTT Awards	2026	Best Lead Actor	Made in Korea	Nominated	
Blue Dragon Series Awards	2026	Best Actor	Made in Korea	Nominated	
KBS Drama Awards	2006	Best Couple Award	Hyun Bin (with Sung Yu-ri); The Snow Queen	Won	
KBS Drama Awards	2006	Netizen Award	The Snow Queen	Won	
KBS Drama Awards	2006	Popularity Award	The Snow Queen	Won	
KBS Drama Awards	2006	Excellence Award, Actor	The Snow Queen	Nominated	
KBS Drama Awards	2008	Excellence Award, Actor in a Miniseries	Worlds Within	Nominated	
Korean Association of Film Critics Awards	2026	Best Actor in a OTT Series	Made in Korea	Won	
Korean Film Actors Association Awards	2017	Top Star Award	Confidential Assignment, The Swindlers	Won	
Bucheon International Fantastic Film Festival	2014	Producer's Choice Award	Hyun Bin	Won	
MBC Drama Awards	2004	Best New Actor	Ireland	Won	
MBC Drama Awards	2005	Best Couple Award	Hyun Bin (with Kim Sun-a); My Lovely Sam Soon	Won	
MBC Drama Awards	2005	Popularity Award	My Lovely Sam Soon	Won	
MBC Drama Awards	2005	Top Excellence Award, Actor	My Lovely Sam Soon	Won	
MBC Drama Awards	2009	Excellence Award, Actor	Friend, Our Legend	Nominated	
MBC Entertainment Awards	2004	Special Award, TV Actor category	Nonstop 4	Won	
MBC Entertainment Awards	2004	Excellence Award, Actor in a Comedy/Sitcom	Nonstop 4	Nominated	
SBS Drama Awards	2010	Best Couple Award	Hyun Bin (with Ha Ji-won); Secret Garden	Won	
SBS Drama Awards	2010	Netizen Popularity Award	Secret Garden	Won	
SBS Drama Awards	2010	Top 10 Stars	Secret Garden	Won	
SBS Drama Awards	2010	Top Excellence Award, Actor in a Drama Special	Secret Garden	Won	
SBS Drama Awards	2015	Top Excellence Award, Actor in a Drama Special	Hyde Jekyll, Me	Nominated	
Yahoo! Asia Buzz Awards	2020	Most Popular Korean Artist	Hyun Bin	Won	

=== State honors ===
Name of country, year given, and name of honor
Country	Year	Honor	Ref.
South Korea (Note: Honors are given at the Korean Popular Culture and Arts Awards, arranged by the Korea Creative Content Agency and hosted by the Ministry of Culture, Sports and Tourism. They are awarded to those who have contributed to the arts and South Korea's pop culture.)	2020	Presidential Commendation	

=== Listicles ===
Name of publisher, year listed, name of listicle, and placement
Publisher	Year	Listicle	Placement	Ref.
Forbes	2011	Korea Power Celebrity	32nd	
Forbes	2015	Korea Power Celebrity	19th	
Forbes	2020	Korea Power Celebrity	29th	
Forbes	2021	Korea Power Celebrity	21st	
Gallup Korea	2024	Best Television Couple of the Past Decade (Note: With Son Ye-jin for Crash Landing on You (2019))	1st	
Korean Film Council	2021	Korean Actors 200 (Note: Introduces 200 actors that best represent the present and future of Korean cinema to the people in the film industry all over the world.)	Included	
The Screen	2019	2009–2019 Top Box Office Powerhouse Actors in Korean Movies	37th	
