= Woo Min-ho =

South Korean filmmaker (born 1971)

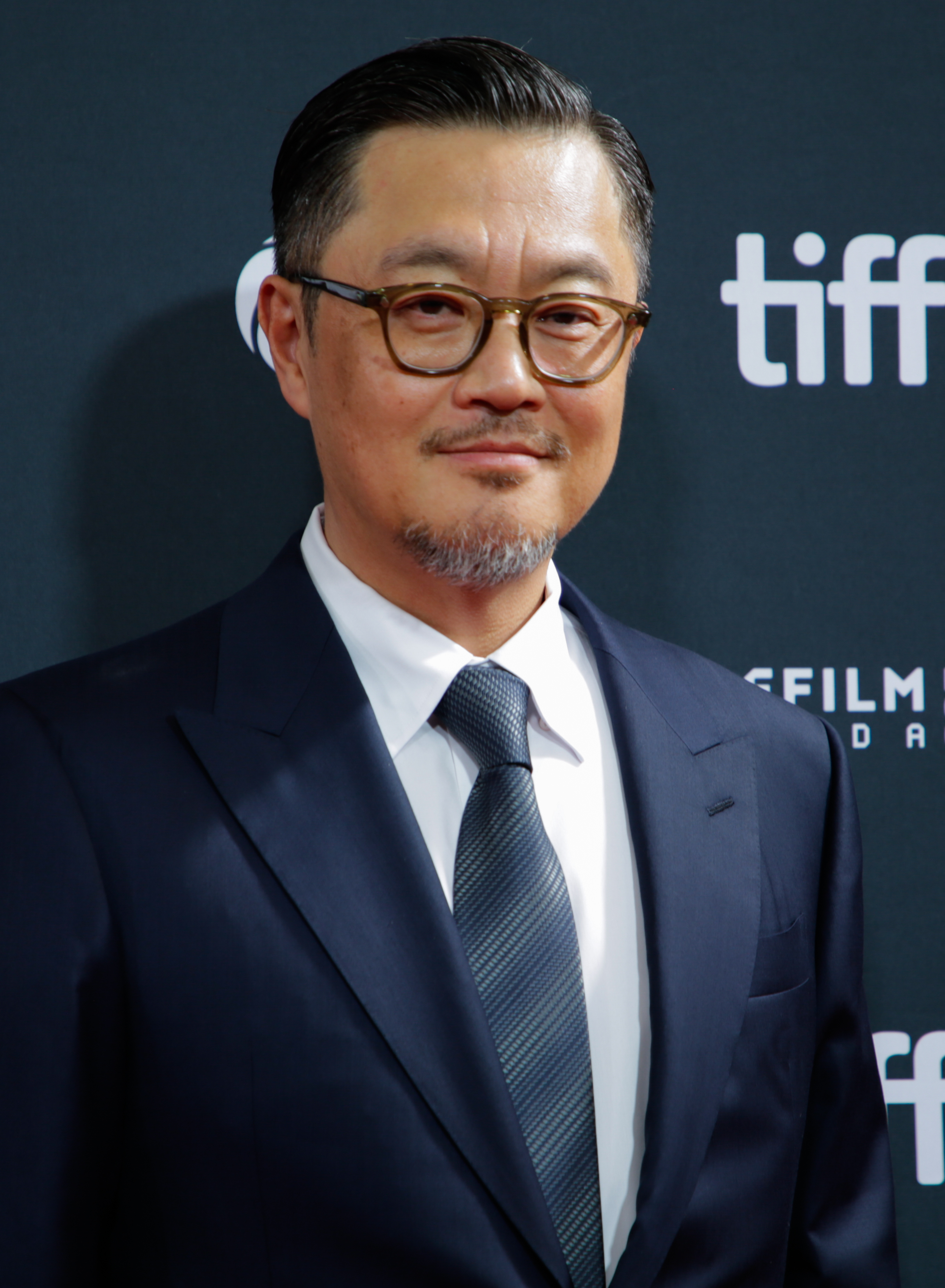
- Woo at the 2024 Toronto International Film Festival
- Born: 1971 (age 54–55); South Korea
- Occupations: Film director, screenwriter
- Years active: 2000–present

Korean name
- Hangul: 우민호
- Hanja: 禹民鎬
- RR: U Minho
- MR: U Minho

Woo Min-ho (Korean: 우민호; born 1971) is a South Korean film director and screenwriter. Woo debuted with the revenge thriller Man of Vendetta (2010), followed by the action comedy thriller The Spies (2012); both films starred Kim Myung-min in the lead. His political thriller Inside Men (2015), based on Yoon Tae-ho's webtoon The Insiders, was focused on the corrupt systems existing in Korea, honing in on the intense competition between the characters themselves. Starring Lee Byung-hun, it was a hit with more than 5.7 million admissions as of December 12, 2015.

== Filmography ==
=== Film ===
Year	Title	Credited as			Notes	Ref.
Year	Title	Director	Writer	Producer	Notes	Ref.
2000	Who killed Jesus?	Yes	Yes	No	(short film, 2000)	
2010	Man of Vendetta	Yes	Yes	No		
2012	The Spies	Yes	Yes	No		
2015	Inside Men	Yes	Yes (Note: With Seol Woo-shin)	No		
2018	The Drug King	Yes	Yes (Note: With Lee Ji-min)	No		
2020	The Man Standing Next	Yes	Yes	Yes		
2024	Harbin	Yes	Yes (Note: With Kim Min-seong)	No		

=== Television ===
Year	Title	Credited as			Notes
Year	Title	Director	Writer	Producer	Notes
2026	Made in Korea	Yes	No	No	

== Awards and nominations ==
Year	Award	Category	Recipient	Result	Ref.
2016	52nd Baeksang Arts Awards	Best Film	Inside Men	Nominated	
2016	52nd Baeksang Arts Awards	Best Director	Inside Men	Nominated	
2016	52nd Baeksang Arts Awards	Best Screenplay	Inside Men	Nominated	
2016	25th Buil Film Awards	Best Film	Inside Men	Nominated	
2016	25th Buil Film Awards	Best Screenplay	Inside Men	Nominated	
2016	37th Blue Dragon Film Awards	Best Film	Inside Men	Won	
2016	37th Blue Dragon Film Awards	Best Director	Inside Men	Nominated	
2016	37th Blue Dragon Film Awards	Best Screenplay	Inside Men	Nominated	
2016	53rd Grand Bell Awards	Best Film	Inside Men	Won	
2016	53rd Grand Bell Awards	Best Director	Inside Men	Won	
2016	53rd Grand Bell Awards	Best Screenplay	Inside Men	Won	
2016	11th Max Movie Awards	Best Film	Inside Men	Nominated	
2016	11th Max Movie Awards	Best Director	Inside Men	Nominated	
2016	11th Max Movie Awards	Best Trailer	Inside Men	Nominated	
2016	21st Chunsa Film Art Awards	Best Director	Inside Men	Nominated	
2016	21st Chunsa Film Art Awards	Best Screenplay	Inside Men	Nominated	
2016	36th Korean Association of Film Critics Awards	Ten Best Films of the Year	Inside Men	Won	
2020	56th Baeksang Arts Awards	Best Film	The Man Standing Next	Nominated	
2020	56th Baeksang Arts Awards	Best Director	The Man Standing Next	Nominated	
2020	56th Baeksang Arts Awards	Best Screenplay	The Man Standing Next	Nominated	
2020	29th Buil Film Awards	Best Film	The Man Standing Next	Nominated	
2020	29th Buil Film Awards	Best Director	The Man Standing Next	Nominated	
2020	29th Buil Film Awards	Best Screenplay	The Man Standing Next	Nominated	
2020	25th Chunsa Film Art Awards	Best Director	The Man Standing Next	Nominated	
2020	40th Korean Association of Film Critics Awards	Best Film	The Man Standing Next	Won	
2020	40th Korean Association of Film Critics Awards	Top 10 Films	The Man Standing Next	Won	
2020	7th Korean Film Producers Association Awards	Best Director	The Man Standing Next	Won	
2020	Cine 21 Awards	Best Screenplay	The Man Standing Next	Won	
2021	41st Blue Dragon Film Awards	Best Film	The Man Standing Next	Won	
2021	41st Blue Dragon Film Awards	Best Director	The Man Standing Next	Nominated	
2021	41st Blue Dragon Film Awards	Best Screenplay	The Man Standing Next	Nominated	
2025	61st Baeksang Arts Awards	Best Director	Harbin	Nominated	
2025	46th Blue Dragon Film Awards	Best Director	Harbin	Nominated	
2025	34th Buil Film Awards	Best Director	Harbin	Nominated	
2025	23rd Director's Cut Awards	Best Director (Film)	Harbin	Nominated	

== See also ==
- List of Korean-language films
- Cinema of South Korea
- Contemporary culture of South Korea
