= The Negotiation (film) =

- Theatrical release poster
- Hangul: 협상
- Hanja: 協商
- RR: Hyeopsang
- MR: Hyŏpsang
- Directed by: Lee Jong-seok
- Screenplay by: Choi Sung-hyun
- Produced by: Yoon Je-kyoon; Lee Sang-jik
- Starring: Son Ye-jin; Hyun Bin
- Cinematography: Lee Tae-yoon
- Edited by: Jung Jin-hee
- Music by: Hwang Sang-joon
- Production companies: JK Film; CJ E&M
- Distributed by: CJ Entertainment
- Release date: September 19, 2018 (South Korea)
- Running time: 114 minutes
- Country: South Korea
- Language: Korean
- Budget: ₩10 billion (~$8.8 million)
- Box office: $15.6 million

The Negotiation (Korean: 협상; RR: Hyeopsang) is a 2018 South Korean crime thriller film directed by Lee Jong-seok and starring Son Ye-jin and Hyun Bin. The film was released on September 19, 2018.

== Plot ==
Two Filipino men kidnap a couple and hold them hostage at a house in Yangjae-dong, Seoul. Inspector Ha Chae-youn, a crisis negotiator working for the Seoul Metropolitan Police Agency, who was on a date and was called by her colleague, Superintendent Ahn Hyuk-su, is brought in to handle the situation, despite strong protests from her superior, Captain Jung Jun-gu. While Chae-youn is negotiating with the kidnappers, Captain Jung decides to send a police hit team to kill the men, shooting one kidnapper in the shoulder. He immediately kills the man he was holding and is shot dead afterwards. The remaining kidnapper used the woman as a shield and dragged her to a room.

The police team arrives and kills the kidnapper in the room. Chae-youn enters the room to find that the woman had been killed by the kidnapper before the police team entered the house. The woman dies in Chae-youn's arms, leaving Chae-youn shocked. 10 days later, a devastated Chae-youn decides to resign from the police force, but Captain Jung urges her to reconsider, before leaving on a work trip. Chae-youn is then urgently called upon by Ahn, who informs her that she has been urgently summoned to deal with a hostage crisis by the Commissioner himself. Upon arrival at a secret location, she meets with the Commissioner of Police Moon Jong-hyuk and the Presidential Secretary Gong of National Security.

Chae-yoon is ordered to negotiate with the kidnapper - Min Tae-gu, a Korea-based international arms dealer and UK citizen, who had kidnapped several Korean nationals from Bangkok - including a reporter named Lee Su-mok. Without any additional information, she hung up on Min twice after being offended by him, and asks Secretary Gong to reveal to her the necessary details. Not wanting to talk, the two men ordered Chief Han to talk to Min instead, while she was hesitant to do so. Upon seeing the negotiations going sour, she takes the seat from Chief Han. While negotiating with Min via video conferencing, she is shocked to discover that Captain Jung, who was supposed to be on a trip, has also been kidnapped by Min as well.

Chae-youn is later informed that the hostages are being held at an island in the Malacca Straits, where a joint military-police op has been sent to, intent on freeing them. Han also informs them that Daehan Daily, a news outlet Lee is working for, had been ordered to keep silent about their employee's situation, as per requested by the President. Min later demands to see the CEO of Daehan Daily, Yoon Dong-hoon, Lee's boss. While talking with Dong-hoon, Min demands to know whether Lee is one of his own reporters or not. Min threatens Yoon that his own family could be in danger, revealing that he knows of their whereabouts. Commissioner Moon cuts into their conversation to stop Yoon from telling the truth. Because of this, Min shoots Captain Jung dead, which further shocks Chae-youn. Commissioner Moon and Secretary Gong bring in negotiators from the National Intelligence Services to take over and orders Chae-youn, Ahn, and even Han to leave the site.

Outside, Han reveals to them that Lee is a black agent working for the NIS, whose mission was to spy on Min's syndicate. She tells them that Min is an arms dealer working in the Malacca Straits, selling every kind of weapons and equipment to other criminals in the majority of the Southeast-Asian countries. Chae-youn's two colleagues arrive in their van, and Chae-youn seeks to find out the truth themselves. She then asks Ahn to follow Yoon and ask him further. Back inside, the NIS team approached Min aggressively, demanding that Min release his hostages or otherwise they would bombard his location, killing Agent Lee with him. Unbothered, Min reveals that he had also kidnapped a family of four, keeping the NIS under his thumb. Min demands to bring Chae-youn back as he will only talk to her.

With no other choice, Chief Han goes over to bring Chae-youn, along with her team, back inside. This time, Chae-youn demands that the NIS to tell her everything that they know about Min. Min demands that Chae-youn bring Koo Gwan-su—chairman of Nine Electronics, an arms company. As they wait, the NIS tells Chae-youn that Min used to work for Koo as the man in charge of dealing with the company's illegal activities. When Min decided to work alone as an arms dealer in the Malacca Straits, Koo betrays Min and tipped him off to the NIS. Koo also revealed the $50 million worth of taxes that he had evaded, and due to his 'honesty', the government practically erased his criminal activities. When Chae-youn asks where Koo really is, the NIS agent reveals to her that they were all inside the Nine Electrics weapons laboratory. Koo himself had funded the entire operation of the NIS to hunt Min down.

In a hotel suite lounge somewhere downtown were Koo, NIS Deputy Chief Park In-kyu, Air Force Commander Son Jung-tae, and the Chief of National Security himself, Hwang Ju-ik. These four men had been keeping a close eye on the entire operation. Meanwhile, Ahn found out from the escaping Yoon that NIS Deputy Chief Park was the one who asked him to give Agent Lee a false Daehan Daily ID. Koo arrives at the site and begins to talk with Min. Min asks Koo to restore a certain Swiss bank account, and Koo agrees to it. However, Min had further demands. He asks Koo why he had killed a woman named Yoo Hyun-ju. Koo denies any knowledge of any Hyun-ju, and Min began to tell Chae-youn of Hyun-ju. Min introduced Hyun-ju to Koo as his secretary. In reality, Hyun-ju was to keep records of hidden, expensive paintings that Koo owned and kept.

These paintings are worth 10 billion won each, and profits from these paintings would be shared between Koo, Park, Son, and Hwang. Some of the paintings were kept in a house that Hyun-ju and presumably her husband stayed in. It is revealed that Hyun-ju was the woman who died in Chae-youn's arms ten days ago, and Min convinces Chae-youn that something was amiss during that operation, which resulted in Hyun-ju's death, and the disappearance of the paintings in the house almost immediately. To further prove his point, Min plays an audio recording of a conversation between the four corrupt men. This recording was done by Hwang himself, where Min explained that Hwang never fully trusted the three other men he was working with, and had a habit of keeping recording devices for important conversations. Min then demands that Hwang show up and talk to him in one hour, otherwise he'll kill every hostage—including the children.

Chae-youn and her team validate the information Min had given as they try to figure out the connection between Min and Hyun-ju. Secretary Gong lies to Chae-youn, telling her that Hwang was with the President, and that he couldn't come. Meanwhile, Ahn was able to track down Chief Park's phone records. There, he found out that Captain Jung had accepted a bribe from Chief Park. Captain Jung was under the command of Chief Park, and that they planned to kill Hyun-ju by using the Filipino kidnappers as an alibi. Chae-youn resumes the negotiations with Min, telling Min that Hyun-ju's case will be reopened. Min demands to talk with Commissioner Moon. Min asks if Koo is really being questioned by the police, and that if Hwang is really with the President. Before answering, they found out from a Thai server that Min had been live-streaming the entire situation on YouTube, which sent the country into a frenzy.

Upon figuring out that Koo is not being questioned, and that Hwang is in hiding, Min shoots Agent Lee in the leg. He gives Hwang one last chance to show himself. Back in their lounge, Hwang orders Chief Park to invent a story and Commander Son to begin the military operation immediately. Hwang wants Min dead, along with the hostages. Meanwhile, Ahn returns to Hyun-ju's home, where the kidnapping ten days ago occurred. There, he found a photo of Somang Orphanage, an old orphanage where Hyun-ju came from. He goes over to the new orphanage, and he found out that Hyun-ju's real name wasn't Yoon Hyun-ju, but Min Hyun-ju—she was Min's younger sister. Back in the lab, the military team arrived in Min's location and authorizes the mission, despite Chae-youn's protests. Min reveals that a bomb is strapped on one of the hostages, revealing a suicide for all of them. Either way, the team blows up a signal tower—stopping their communication.

Chae-youn tries to stop the team from entering Min's hideout as a bomb is present. Hwang (through Commander Son) pressures them to continue, and the team enters the hideout. However, as soon as they moved in, the room had exploded, presumably from Min's suicide bomb, and killing the hostages inside. Hwang and his cronies were finally able to relax, and the NIS were packing up their things. As Chae-youn stares at the last footages of their negotiations with Min in despair, she notices through the background that Min wasn't in Southeast Asia, but in South Korea all along. That night, Ahn went to the old orphanage building and found all of the hostages safe. Meanwhile, Min and his gang arrived at the Nine Electronics weapons lab. He orders his fellow gang to go home, and takes the bomb with him. Min storms the lounge and finally catches Hwang, Koo, Park, and Son, with the bomb strapped to his chest.

Chae-youn convinced Secretary Gong to reveal the true location of Hwang and his cronies, so that they can stop Min. Min shoots Koo, activates the bomb via a detonator, and Chae-youn arrives at the lounge to finally meet Min. She apologizes to Min for not being able to protect Hyun-ju, and she vows to defend Min at any cost to bring the remaining cronies to justice. Min reveals to her that he asked Hyun-ju to betray Koo by stealing every bit of information he had. He believed that his plan ultimately led to his sister's death. He raises the gun at Hwang, and he was shot to the head by a sniper outside. A flashback reveals that Min backfired with his plan, telling his sister that the plan is too dangerous after all. However, Hyun-ju wanted to proceed with the plan, so that the two of them could find a place to live in silence and peace.

As the team arrived to escort Hwang, Park, Son, and Chae-youn outside, Chae-youn overheard that the detonator wasn't actually turned on, and it was Min's plan to die in the end, and bring the corrupt men to justice. Chae-youn chases Hwang outside, prematurely telling them of their arrest as she shouts their rights to them. As their car leaves, the reporters then surround Chae-youn. Chae-youn and Ahn went to an overlooking spot, where they made a makeshift memorial for Min and Hyun-ju. Chae-youn shows Ahn of Min's pen drive presumably with the dealings of Hwang and his cronies, as stolen by Hyun-ju. In court, Hwang, Park, Son, and Chae-youn appear, with Chae-youn as a prime witness. The pen drive is revealed to the court as evidence, and the film ends with Chae-youn reciting an oath.

== Cast ==
=== Main ===
- Son Ye-jin as Ha Chae-yoon
- Hyun Bin as Min Tae-gu

=== Supporting ===
- Kim Sang-ho as Ahn Hyuk-soo
- Jang Young-nam as Section Chief Han
- Jang Gwang as Hwang Soo-suk
- Choi Byung-mo as Secretary Kong
- Jo Young-jin as Chairman Koo
- Kim Jong-goo as CEO Yoon
- Yoo Yeon-soo as Chief Moon
- iyad hajjaj as Afghan Representative
- Lee Joo-young as Lee Da-bin
- Kim Min-sang as Deputy Department Head Park
- Park Sung-geun as Operation officer
- Park Hyung-soo as NIS negotiation agent
- Han Ki-joong as Lieutenant General Son
- Park Soo-young as Section Chief Choi
- Jung In-gyeom as Lee Sang-mok
- Lee Si-a as Yoo Yeon-joo
- Lee Hak-joo as Park Min-woo

=== Special appearance ===
- Lee Moon-sik as Capt. Jung

== Production ==
Principal photography began on June 17, 2017, in Paju, Gyeonggi Province.

== Release ==
The film premiered in South Korea on September 19, 2018.

By September 2018, the film was sold to over 22 countries. It was released in North America on September 20, in Singapore, Malaysia, and Brunei on October 4, in Hong Kong and Macau in early October, in Vietnam and Taiwan on October 19, and in Indonesia on October 24, 2018.

The film was released on VOD services and digital download since October 17, 2018.

== Remake ==
An Indian-made remake, Godse, produced in Telugu, was released on June 17, 2022.

== Reception ==
=== Critical response ===
Shim Sun-ah from Yonhap News Agency praised the film and wrote, "Director Lee builds an engrossing plot brimming over with twists, giving audiences edge-of-the-seat entertainment almost till the end. Fine performances from Son and Hyun Bin help to gloss over some logical loopholes in the film. Hyun Bin also impressively carries off the cold-blooded villain. The score and cinematography enhances the quality of the film. Overall, the film is a gripping suspense thriller and a great one-time watch."

Film Journal International noted, "It's refreshing to see a woman front and center in an action thriller, and this hostage melodrama from Korea delivers on the thrills-and-spills level... [the film] is filled with impressively kinetic action scenes and is keenly edited.

Kevin Crust from Los Angeles Times reviewed the film as "despite being laden by melodramatic turns and an exposition-heavy last act, the film never develops into the thriller it aspires to be".

=== Box office ===
The film earned US$188,041 from previews and pre-sales.

On its opening day, the film finished fourth place at the Korean box office, grossing US$576,290 from 81,022 audiences. During its opening weekend, the film finished third with US$3.6 million gross from 445,098 attendance. After 7 days of release, the film surpassed 1 million admissions on September 25, 2018.

During its second weekend, the film had an 18% drop in gross with US$3 million from 368,689 attendance, finishing in second place, tailing The Great Battle in the lead. The film dropped to fifth place during its third weekend, earning US$333,567 gross from 42,215 attendance.

As of December 7, 2020, the film attracted 1,967,721 moviegoers and grossed US$15.67 million.
