= Harbin (film) =

2024 film by Woo Min-ho

- Theatrical release poster
- Hangul: 하얼빈
- RR: Haeolbin
- MR: Haŏlbin
- Directed by: Woo Min-ho
- Written by: Woo Min-ho; Kim Min-seong
- Produced by: Kim Won-guk
- Starring: Hyun Bin; Park Jeong-min; Jo Woo-jin; Jeon Yeo-been; Park Hoon; Yoo Jae-myung; Lily Franky; Lee Dong-wook
- Cinematography: Hong Kyung-pyo
- Edited by: Kim Man-geun
- Music by: Jo Yeong-wook
- Production companies: Hive Media Corp; Keystone Films; Film Angels Studio
- Distributed by: CJ Entertainment
- Release dates: September 8, 2024 (TIFF); December 24, 2024 (South Korea)
- Running time: 108 minutes
- Country: South Korea
- Languages: Korean; Japanese
- Budget: US$20.6 million
- Box office: US$33.5 million

Harbin (Korean: 하얼빈) is a 2024 South Korean biographical period drama film directed by Woo Min-ho. The film stars Hyun Bin as Ahn Jung-geun, a Korean independence activist who assassinated Itō Hirobumi, the first Prime Minister of Japan, in 1909. The cast also includes Park Jeong-min, Jo Woo-jin, Jeon Yeo-been, Park Hoon, Yoo Jae-myung, Lily Franky, and Lee Dong-wook.

The film had its world premiere in the Gala program of the Toronto International Film Festival on September 8, 2024. It was released theatrically on December 24, 2024.

== Plot ==
In 1909, Ahn Jung-geun, a resistance fighter opposing Korea's subjugation by Japan, struggles across the frozen Tumen River. Meanwhile, his fellow resistance fighters question his whereabouts and loyalty. Ahn returns but has his leadership challenged because most of the fighters under him had died in a recent successful attack against the Japanese. Ahn had refused to commit war crimes by executing prisoners of war, including officer Tatsuo Mori, and freed them. Mori tracked down Ahn's group and slaughtered them with cannon.

Ahn decides that he will redeem himself by assassinating Itō Hirobumi, the Prime Minister of Japan and former Resident General of Korea. Itō is currently travelling by train from China to Russian-controlled Harbin to hold meetings with Vladimir Kokovtsov, the Russian Finance Minister, in which the future of Korea will be discussed.

Ahn leads a team that includes Woo Deok-sun and Kim Sang-hyun by train to Vladivostok. The conductor alerts Japanese soldiers after overhearing them speaking Korean in a first-class carriage. In the ensuing brawl, Kim is knocked out the window and Ahn escapes. Ahn reaches the safehouse in Vladivostok, where the team regroups along with reinforcements from Korea who usurp Ahn's leadership, with Woo being the last to arrive. Meanwhile, Itō is briefed about the assassination plot but refuses to give in and cancel the public reception at Harbin railway station.

The team reaches out to Ms. Gong, a former associate of theirs in the independence struggle who is now an arms smuggler, for explosives to blow up Itō's train carriage. Unable to procure them in Vladivostok quickly enough, Gong instead gets them from her brother-in-law and former Korean independence fighter-turned bandit in Jilin.

With this delay, it is now too late to assassinate Itō in Changchun. As the team sets out for China, they are ambushed outside their safe house by Russian and Japanese troops led by Mori and the explosives are destroyed. The team suspects they have been infiltrated by a mole. On the train to Harbin, they carry out a sting operation using false information that Ahn's team will strike at a railway station where Itō is scheduled to switch trains before reaching Harbin. The sting reveals that Kim is the traitor.

Woo and Kim arrive at the change station, where Japanese troops led by Mori lie in wait. Woo confronts Kim about his betrayal, who breaks down before Woo can shoot him. A flashback shows that Kim was captured and tortured by Mori using gas. Mori breaks into the room and brutally interrogates the two about Ahn, before realizing that he must be in Harbin.

At Harbin railway station, Ahn is briefed about the situation by Gong. After the meeting is over, the dignitaries leave the train carriage and Ahn stalks them through the crowd as they cross the platform. Mori tries to catch Ahn but is knocked down by Gong, allowing Ahn to shoot Itō repeatedly while shouting "Long live Korea!" in Russian before being detained.

News of Itō's assassination spreads and Ahn is hanged in March 1910. Later, Mori meets with Kim to get him to infiltrate Kim Ku's independence movement, but Kim stabs him to death and rejoins Gong and a recently released Woo. A flashback reveals that Ahn had ordered Woo to give Kim a second chance. The film returns to Ahn on the frozen Tumen River thinking about the need to keep fighting for Korean independence no matter how bleak the outlook.

== Cast ==
- Hyun Bin as An Jung-geun
- Park Jeong-min as Woo Deok-sun
- Jo Woo-jin as Kim Sang-hyun
- Jeon Yeo-been as Ms. Gong
- Park Hoon as Tatsuo Mori
- Yoo Jae-myung as Choi Jae-hyung
- Lily Franky as Itō Hirobumi
- Lee Dong-wook as Lee Chang-seop
- Jung Woo-sung as Park Jeom-chul
- Ego Mikitas as Vladimir Kokovtsov

== Production ==
Hive Media Corp announced Hyun Bin had been cast in Harbin in November 2021. Filming took place in early 2023 in Latvia.

== Release ==
Harbin premiered at the Toronto International Film Festival, as part of the Gala section, on September 8, 2024.

== Reception ==
=== Box office ===
The film was released on December 24, 2024 and opened in first place at the South Korean box office with 381,251 admissions. The film topped the South Korean box office for twenty eight days following its release. On December 25, the film surpassed 1 million audience on the second day of its release, on December 28, it crossed 2 million viewers on the fifth day of its release, and on January 1, the film hit 3 million admissions on the ninth day of its release.

As of March 15, 2025, the film has grossed US$32,928,686 from 4,911,782 admissions.

=== Critical response ===
On the review aggregator website Rotten Tomatoes, 89% of 18 critics' reviews are positive, with an average rating of 6.5/10. International political scientist and Conservative Party of Japan politician, Yōichi Shimada and other conservatives in Japan criticized this movie, alongside Biochemical Revelations 731 (released in China) as "revisionist propaganda designed to encourage animosity towards Japan".

=== Accolades ===
Award	Year	Category	Recipient(s)	Result	Ref.
Asian Film Awards	2025	Best Cinematography	Hong Kyung-pyo	Won	
Baeksang Arts Awards	2025	Grand Prize – Film	Hong Kyung-pyo (cinematographer)	Won	
Baeksang Arts Awards	2025	Best Film	Harbin	Won	
Baeksang Arts Awards	2025	Best Director	Woo Min-ho	Nominated	
Baeksang Arts Awards	2025	Best Actor	Hyun Bin	Nominated	
Baeksang Arts Awards	2025	Best Supporting Actor	Jo Woo-jin	Nominated	
Baeksang Arts Awards	2025	Best Technical Achievement	Hong Kyung-pyo (Cinematography)	Nominated	
Blue Dragon Film Awards	2025	Best Film	Harbin	Nominated	
Blue Dragon Film Awards	2025	Best Director	Woo Min-ho	Nominated	
Blue Dragon Film Awards	2025	Best Actor	Hyun Bin	Won	
Blue Dragon Film Awards	2025	Best Supporting Actor	Park Jeong-min	Nominated	
Blue Dragon Film Awards	2025	Best Editing	Kim Man-geun	Nominated	
Blue Dragon Film Awards	2025	Best Cinematography and Lighting	Hong Kyung-pyo, Park Jeong-woo	Won	
Blue Dragon Film Awards	2025	Best Art Direction	Kim Bo-muk	Nominated	
Blue Dragon Film Awards	2025	Best Music	Jo Yeong-wook	Nominated	
Buil Film Awards	2025	Best Film	Harbin	Nominated	
Buil Film Awards	2025	Best Director	Woo Min-ho	Nominated	
Buil Film Awards	2025	Best Actor	Hyun Bin	Nominated	
Buil Film Awards	2025	Best Supporting Actor	Jo Woo-jin	Nominated	
Buil Film Awards	2025	Best Cinematography	Hong Kyung-pyo	Won	
Buil Film Awards	2025	Best Art/Technical Award	Kwak Jeong-ae	Nominated	
Buil Film Awards	2025	Best Art/Technical Award	Park Jeong-woo	Won	
Buil Film Awards	2025	Best Music	Jo Yeong-wook	Nominated	
Director's Cut Awards	2025	Best Director (Film)	Woo Min-ho	Nominated	
Florence Korea Film Fest	2025	Audience Choice Award	Harbin	Won	
Korean Film Producers Association Awards	2025	Best Technical Award	Kwak Jeong-ae	Won	
