= Jo Yeong-wook =

South Korean film score composer (born 1962)

- Born: January 1, 1962 (age 64); South Korea
- Other name: Cho Young-wuk
- Occupation: Music supervisor
- Years active: 1997–present

Korean name
- Hangul: 조영욱
- RR: Jo Yeonguk
- MR: Cho Yŏnguk

Jo Yeong-wook (Korean: 조영욱, occasionally romanized as Cho Young-wuk; born January 1, 1962) is a South Korean film score composer and music director. He is most widely known for his collaborations with director Park Chan-wook.

== Filmography ==
=== Film ===
Year	Title		Note
Year	English	Korean	Note
1997	The Contact	접속	
1998	The Quiet Family	조용한 가족	
1998	If the Sun Rises in the West	해가 서쪽에서 뜬다면	
1999	Tell Me Something	텔 미 썸딩	
1999	Happy End	해피엔드	
2000	Bloody Beach	해변으로 가다	
2000	Joint Security Area	공동경비구역 JSA	
2001	A Day	하루	
2002	Public Enemy	공공의 적	
2002	Ardor	밀애	
2003	The Classic	클래식	
2003	Silmido	실미도	
2003	Oldboy	올드보이	
2003	If You Were Me	여섯 개의 시선	
2004	Too Beautiful to Lie	그녀를 믿지 마세요	
2004	Some	썸	
2004	Lovely Rivals	여선생 vs 여제자	
2004	Flying Boys	발레 교습소	
2005	Blood Rain	혈의 누	
2005	Sympathy for Lady Vengeance	친절한 금자씨	
2006	A Dirty Carnival	비열한 거리	
2006	Traces of Love	가을로	
2006	I'm a Cyborg, But That's OK	싸이보그지만 괜찮아	
2007	Miss Gold Digger	용의주도 미스 신	
2008	Out of My Intention	나도 모르게	short film
2008	Public Enemy Returns	강철중: 공공의 적 1-1	also credited as producer
2009	Thirst	박쥐	
2009	White Night	백야행: 하얀 어둠 속을 걷다	
2009	Invitation	초대	short film
2010	Seoul	서울	
2010	Moss	이끼	
2010	The Unjust	부당거래	
2010	Interview with the Vampire		short film
2010	Mirror, Mirror		short film
2011	GLove	글러브	
2011	Q&A	백문백답	short film in If You Were Me 5, 2011
2011	The Client	의뢰인	
2011	Pandora		short film
2012	Nameless Gangster: Rules of the Time	범죄와의 전쟁: 나쁜놈들 전성시대	
2012	Hand in Hand		
2012	The Concubine	후궁: 제왕의 첩	
2012	Deranged	연가시	
2013	New World	신세계	
2013	The Berlin File	베를린	
2013	Fists of Legend	전설의 주먹	
2013	Mai Ratima	마이 라띠마	
2013	Hide and Seek	숨바꼭질	
2013	Tough as Iron	깡철이	
2013	The Attorney	변호인	
2014	Mad Sad Bad	신촌좀비만화	
2014	Kundo: Age of the Rampant	군도: 민란의 시대	
2015	Gangnam Blues	강남 1970	
2015	The Shameless	무뢰한	
2015	Minority Opinion	소수의견	
2015	The Beauty Inside	뷰티 인사이드	
2015	Inside Men	내부자들	
2015	The Tiger	대호	
2016	The Handmaiden	아가씨	
2016	Pandora	판도라	
2017	Lucid Dream	루시드 드림	
2017	A Single Rider	싱글라이더	
2017	The Sheriff in Town	보안관	
2017	A Taxi Driver	택시운전사	
2018	The Spy Gone North	공작	
2018	The Drug King	마약왕	
2019	Mal-Mo-E: The Secret Mission	말모이	
2019	Innocent Witness	증인	
2019	The Gangster, the Cop, the Devil	악인전	
2020	The Man Standing Next	남산의 부장들	
2020	The Closet	클로젯	
2021	Seo Bok	서복	
2021	Cliff Walkers		Chinese film: 悬崖之上
2021	Soup and Ideology	수프와 이데올로기	
2022	Decision to Leave	헤어질 결심	
2022	Hunt	헌트	
2023	Honey Sweet	달짝지근해: 7510	
2023	Under the Light	坚如磐石	
2024	Revolver	리볼버	
2024	Uprising	전,란	
2024	Harbin	하얼빈	
2025	The Match	승부	
2025	No Other Choice	어쩔수가없다	
2026	The Assassin(s)	암살자(들)	

=== Television ===
- The Little Drummer Girl (2018)
- Narco-Saints (2022)
- The Sympathizer (2024)
- Nine Puzzles (2025)
- Queen Mantis (2025)
- Made in Korea (2025)

== Awards and nominations ==
Award	Year	Category	Recipients	Result	Ref.
8th Chunsa Film Art Awards	2000	Best Music	Joint Security Area	Won	
2nd Korean Film Awards	2003	Best Music	The Classic	Won	
11th Chunsa Film Art Awards	2003	Best Music	The Classic	Won	
41st Grand Bell Awards	2004	Best Music	Oldboy	Won	
24th Korean Film Critics Association Awards	2004	Best Music	Oldboy	Won	
3rd Korean Film Awards	2004	Best Music	Oldboy	Won	
30th Blue Dragon Film Awards	2009	Best Music	Thirst	Won	
18th Chunsa Film Art Awards	2010	Best Music	Moss	Won	
21st Buil Film Awards	2012	Best Music	Nameless Gangster: Rules of the Time	Nominated	
33rd Blue Dragon Film Awards	2013	Best Music	Nameless Gangster: Rules of the Time	Won	
7th Asian Film Awards	2013	Best Original Score	Nameless Gangster: Rules of the Time	Nominated	
22nd Buil Film Awards	2013	Best Music	The Berlin File	Won	
50th Grand Bell Awards	2013	Best Music	New World	Won	
50th Grand Bell Awards	2013	Best Music	Hide and Seek	Nominated	
34th Blue Dragon Film Awards	2013	Best Music	Hide and Seek	Nominated	
23rd Buil Film Awards	2014	Best Music	Hide and Seek	Nominated	
The 10th Jecheon International Music & Film Festival	2014	Jecheon Film Music Award	Jo Yeong-wook	Won	
23rd Buil Film Awards	2014	Best Music	Kundo: Age of the Rampant	Won	
34th Korean Association of Film Critics Awards	2014	Best Music	Kundo: Age of the Rampant	Won	
51st Grand Bell Awards	2014	Best Music	Kundo: Age of the Rampant	Nominated	
35th Blue Dragon Film Awards	2014	Best Music	Kundo: Age of the Rampant	Won	
24th Buil Film Awards	2015	Best Music	The Shameless	Won	
36th Blue Dragon Film Awards	2015	Best Music	The Beauty Inside	Nominated	
37th Blue Dragon Film Awards	2016	Best Music	The Handmaiden	Nominated	
25th Buil Film Awards	2016	Best Music	The Handmaiden	Nominated	
26th Buil Film Awards	2017	Best Music	A Taxi Driver	Nominated	
54th Grand Bell Awards	2017	Best Music	A Taxi Driver	Nominated	
38th Blue Dragon Film Awards	2017	Best Music	A Taxi Driver	Won	
12th Asian Film Awards	2017	Best Original Music	A Taxi Driver	Nominated	
Blue Dragon Film Awards	2018	Best Music	The Spy Gone North	Nominated	
Blue Dragon Film Awards	2021	Best Music	The Man Standing Next	Nominated	
Buil Film Awards	2020	Best Music	The Man Standing Next	Nominated	
Asian Film Awards	2023	Best Music	Decision to Leave	Nominated	
Blue Dragon Film Awards	2022	Best Music	Decision to Leave	Won	
Buil Film Awards	2022	Best Music	Decision to Leave	Won	
Grand Bell Awards	2022	Best Music	Decision to Leave	Nominated	
Korean Association of Film Critics Awards	2022	Best Music	Decision to Leave	Won	
Korean Film Producers Association Award	2022	Best Music and light (Note: Team, Jo Yeong-wook (music) and Shin Sang-yeol (lighting))	Decision to Leave	Won	
Blue Dragon Film Awards	2022	Best Music	Hunt	Nominated	
Grand Bell Awards	2022	Best Music	Hunt	Nominated	
Baeksang Arts Awards	2025	Best Technical Achievement	Uprising	Won	
Blue Dragon Film Awards	2025	Best Music (shared with Lee Myeong-ro, Kwon So-hyun, Shin Hyun-ji)	Uprising	Nominated	
Buil Film Awards	2025	Best Music	Uprising	Nominated	
Blue Dragon Film Awards	2025	Best Music	Harbin	Nominated	
Buil Film Awards	2025	Best Music	Harbin	Nominated	
Blue Dragon Film Awards	2025	Best Music	No Other Choice	Won	
Buil Film Awards	2026	Best Music	No Other Choice	Nominated	
