= The Drug King =

- Theatrical release poster
- Hangul: 마약왕
- Hanja: 麻藥王
- RR: Mayagwang
- MR: Mayagwang
- Directed by: Woo Min-ho
- Written by: Woo Min-ho
- Produced by: Kim Jin-woo
- Starring: Song Kang-ho; Jo Jung-suk; Bae Doona; Kim Dae-myung; Kim So-jin; Lee Hee-joon; Jo Woo-jin
- Cinematography: Go Nak-seon
- Edited by: Kim Sang-bum; Kim Jae-bum
- Music by: Jo Yeong-wook
- Production company: Hive Media Corp.
- Distributed by: Showbox
- Release date: December 19, 2018
- Running time: 139 minutes
- Country: South Korea
- Languages: Korean; Japanese
- Budget: ₩15 billion (US$13.4 million)
- Box office: US$14.5 million

The Drug King (Korean: 마약왕; RR: Mayagwang) is a 2018 South Korean crime drama film written and directed by Woo Min-ho. It stars Song Kang-ho as Lee Doo-sam, an ordinary small-time narcotics dealer who becomes an infamous drug lord in Korea during the 1970s. The film also features Jo Jung-suk as a prosecutor from Seoul who is intent on taking Lee down and Bae Doona as a lobbyist who guides Lee into the upper levels of drug dealing. Other cast members include Kim Dae-myung, Kim So-jin, Lee Hee-joon, and Jo Woo-jin. The film was released on December 19, 2018.

== Plot ==
True life story of Lee Doo-sam (Lee Hwang-soon), a drug smuggler building his empire in Busan's crime underworld in the 1970s. Lee was originally a member of the Chilsung faction in Busan from Hwanghae Province. In the early 1970s, he smuggled diamonds and other products, and eventually expanded it to drugs for domestic distribution, and exported it to Japan as well, thus accumulating huge amounts of wealth in the process.

== Cast ==
- Song Kang-ho as Lee Doo-sam, a Korean drug lord from Busan, South Korea and the main protagonist of the film.
- Jo Jung-suk as Kim In-goo, a lawful prosecutor and the main rival of Lee Doo-sam.
- Bae Doona as Kim Jeong-ah, a powerful socialite, lobbyist and Doo-sam's lover.
- Kim Dae-myung as Lee Doo-hwan, Lee Doo-sam's younger cousin and fellow drug trafficker
- Kim So-jin as Sung Sook-kyung, a preacher's daughter and Lee Doo-sam's wife.
- Lee Hee-joon as Choi Jin-pil, a boat captain, smuggler, and an ally-turned-main rival of Lee Doo-sam drug empire
- Jo Woo-jin as Jo Seong-kang, a gangster boss and leader of a powerful Korean mafia
- Yoon Je-moon as Kim Soon-pyung, a Zainichi Korean yakuza boss based in Osaka, Japan and an associate of Hideki
- Yoo Jae-myung as Chief Kim, a detective who leads an operation against Doo-sam's drug empire
- Lee Joong-ok as Yoon Kang-shik
- Choi Deok-moon as Director Goo
- Song Young-chang as UN Ambassador, a corrupt Korean ambassador of UN who is implied be a gangster.
- Kim Hae-gon as Baek Woon-chang
- Park Ji-hwan as Wang Moon-ho, a Sino Korean drug trafficker and a member of Doo-sam's drug gang
- Lee Bong-ryun as Lee Doo-sook
- Choi Gwi-hwa as Chief Ham
- Park Kyung-hye as Lee Kyung-ja
- Keijiro Matsushima as Hideki, a yakuza gangster from Osaka, Japan.
- Na Kwang-Hoon as Seo Soo-Gon, the Zainichi Korean yakuza boss in Kobe, Japan
- Tetsu Watanabe as Chairman Jin, a yakuza boss from Tokyo, Japan
- Lee Sung-min as Seo Sang-hoon
- Kim Hong-pa as Professor Baek, an enigmatic and legendary meth maker.

== Production ==
Principal photography began on May 5, 2017. Filming was completed on October 10, 2017.

== Awards and nominations ==
Awards	Category	Recipient	Result	Ref.
55th Baeksang Arts Awards	Best Supporting Actor	Jo Woo-jin	Nominated	
