= The Snow Queen (South Korean TV series) =

2006 South Korean television series

- Promotional poster
- Hangul: 눈의 여왕
- Hanja: 눈의 女王
- RR: Nunui yeowang
- MR: Nunŭi yŏwang
- Genre: Melodrama; Romance
- Written by: Kim Eun-hee; Yoon Eun-kyung
- Directed by: Lee Hyung-min
- Starring: Hyun Bin; Sung Yu-ri; Im Joo-hwan; Yoo In-young
- Country of origin: South Korea
- Original language: Korean
- No. of episodes: 16

Production
- Producer: Ki Min-soo
- Production location: South Korea
- Production company: Yoon's Color

Original release
- Network: Korean Broadcasting System
- Release: November 13, 2006 – January 8, 2007

The Snow Queen (Korean: 눈의 여왕; RR: Nunui yeowang) is a South Korean television series starring Hyun Bin and Sung Yu-ri. It aired on KBS2 from November 13, 2006 to January 8, 2007 on Mondays and Tuesdays at 21:55 (KST) for 16 episodes.

== Synopsis ==
The drama starts with Han Tae-woong (Hyun Bin), a quiet, 17-year-old math genius, entering a prestigious high school. There he meets Kim Jung-kyu (Lee Seon-ho), also a genius in mathematics. The two immediately develop rivalry and tension, but later become best friends. Through their conversations, we learn that Jung-kyu is a big boxing enthusiast. Meanwhile, Tae-woong stumbles upon a little girl being bullied in the street and saves her. The girl develops a crush on him and gives him her pager so that she can see him again, but they never exchange names or contacts. They promise to meet again soon, but this never happens.

In a highly anticipated International Math Olympiad, Jung-kyu fails to fulfill his father's expectations to win the gold medal, and commits suicide in shame. Tae-woong, who wins the gold medal instead, struggles from guilt, as he feels like he is partly responsible for Jung-kyu's death. From guilt, Tae-woong quits school, leaves home, and disappears.

Eight years later, Tae-woong, now 25, is a nameless boxer, living a completely different life. He abandoned his mother, dropped out of school, left mathematics, and pursued boxing in honor of Jung-kyu, but he still bears painful memories of his past. He then meets Bo-ra (Sung Yu-ri), a beautiful, but cold-hearted young woman. She is the daughter of a rich businessman, but has an incurable disease. After a chain of events, Tae-woong is hired as her chauffeur. They end up falling in love, but Tae-woong discovers that she was the little girl that he met eight years earlier, and that she is Jung-kyu's little sister. Throughout the story the two learn to find true happiness by helping each other. Tae-woong melts Bo-ra's heart with love and helps her open up her heart. In return Bo-ra helps Tae-woong with his painful memories of the past.

== Cast ==
=== Main ===
- Hyun Bin as Han Tae-woong / Han Deuk-gu
- Sung Yu-ri as Kim Bo-ra
  - Ko Joo-yeon as young Kim Bo-ra / Yeo-rin
- Im Joo-hwan as Seo Geon-ho
- Yoo In-young as Lee Seung-ri

=== Supporting ===
- Go Doo-shim as Park Young-ok, Tae-woong's mother
- Jang Jung-hee as Go Soon-ja, Bo-ra's housekeeper
- Chun Ho-jin as Kim Jang-soo, Bo-ra's father
- Oh Mi-hee as Bo-ra's mother
- Kim Eung-soo as Lee Dong-sul, Seung-ri's father
- Lee Cheol-min as Park Dong-pil, boxer
- Kim Tae-hyun as Choi Choong-sik
- Jung Hwa-young as Park Deuk-nam, Soon-ja's daughter
- Lee Seon-ho as Kim Jung-kyu
- Lee Seo-yoon as Hong Ji-hye
- Kim Hak-jin as Ahn Sang-ho
- Park Jin-young as Dr. Park, Bo-ra's doctor
- Choi Deok-moon as Section chief Oh
- Kim Jung-geun as Lee Geum-soo
- Ryu Jae-seung as Jung Eun-bok
- Kim Beol-rae as college math professor
- Choi Yeo-jin (cameo)
- Kim Yeo-jin (cameo)

== Original soundtrack ==
=== Part 1 ===
1. Intro - Kim Ji-su
2. The Snow Queen (Main Theme) - Jo Sung-woo
3. First Snow's Love - Kang Sung-min
4. Poor Man - Choi Won-jun
5. Grace Love - SAT & M
6. Hello - Sogyumo Acacia Band
7. If You Only Knew - Olivia
8. The Snow Queen (Love Theme) - Jo Sung-woo
9. Sub Title - Park Sung-il
10. Jung-kyu's Death - Park Sung-il
11. Waltz of Tears - Park Sung-il
12. First Love - Kim Ji-su
13. Ferma's Equation - Kim Ji-su
14. Old Photo - Kim Ji-su
15. First Snow's Love (Piano ver.) - Kwak Young-jun
16. Outro - Park Sung-il

=== Part 2 ===
1. The Snow Queen - Main Theme (Inst.)
2. Love... Irrepressible Tears - Jo Sung-mo
3. I Feel Sad, but Goodbye - Kan Mi-youn
4. Echo - Loveholic
5. Sorry For Being Late - Ha Dong-kyun
6. First Snow's Love - Kang Sung-min
7. Loving U - ICE CREAM
8. The Day We Broke Up - Nana
9. What Can We Do? - A Hyun
10. Love... Irrepressible Tears (Piano ver.)
11. I Feel Sad, but Goodbye (Inst.)
12. Love... Irrepressible Tars (Inst.)
13. Echo (Inst.)
14. What Can We Do? (Inst.)
15. The Snow Queen - Main Theme (Guitar ver.)
16. Old Photo (Inst.)
17. Outro

== Awards ==
2006 KBS Drama Awards

- Popularity Award, Actor - Hyun Bin
- Popularity Award, Actress - Sung Yu-ri
- Netizen Award, Actor - Hyun Bin
- Best Couple Award - Hyun Bin and Sung Yu-ri

== International broadcast ==
- It aired in Japan on TV Tokyo beginning May 10, 2007. It was rebroadcast in March 2014 on Japanese cable channel LaLaTV.
- It aired in Thailand on Channel 7 beginning November 3, 2007. It was rebroadcast in 2015 on True4U.

== Remake ==
An Indonesian remake was titled Ratu.
