= 61st Baeksang Arts Awards =

2025 edition of award ceremony

- Official poster
- Date: May 5, 2025
- Site: COEX Hall D, Seoul
- Hosted by: Shin Dong-yup; Bae Suzy; Park Bo-gum
- Official website: www.baeksangawards.co.kr

Highlights
- Grand Prize: Film: Hong Kyung-pyo (Harbin); Television: Culinary Class Wars
- Most awards: Film: Uprising (3); Broadcasting: When Life Gives You Tangerines (4)
- Most nominations: Film: Harbin, Love in the Big City, Revolver, Uprising (5 each); Broadcasting: When Life Gives You Tangerines (8)

Television coverage
- Network: JTBC; Naver TV; CHZZK
- Ratings: 2.821%

The 61st Baeksang Arts Awards (Korean: 제61회 백상예술대상) ceremony was held at COEX in Seoul on May 5, 2025, at 20:00 (KST). It was broadcast live simultaneously in South Korea on JTBC, JTBC2, JTBC4, Naver TV, CHZZK, and internationally on Prizm.

It is one of South Korea's most prestigious award shows, recognizing excellence in film, television, and theatre, through strict screening conducted by 60 professional evaluators, judges in the industry, and a group of experts. This year, the existing television category has been renamed to "Broadcasting" to reflect evolving content consumption trends. This change aligns with the shift from traditional cable or terrestrial television channels to a broader range of platforms, including websites and mobile streaming services.

The nominees were announced on April 7, 2025, via its official website. All works released from April 1, 2024, to March 31, 2025, were eligible for nominations.

The highest honors of the night, Grand Prize (Daesang), were awarded to cinematographer Hong Kyung-pyo of Harbin in the film division and entertainment program Culinary Class Wars in the broadcasting division. Uprising was the most winning films with three awards, while When Life Gives You Tangerines also had the most wins of four in the broadcasting division. Yeom Hye-ran won Best Supporting Actress for two consecutive years.

== Winners and nominees ==
Winners are listed first and highlighted in boldface. Nominees are listed per official website.

=== Film ===
Film category
**Grand Prize**
**Hong Kyung-pyo (cinematographer) – Harbin**
| **Best Film** | **Best Director** |
| **Harbin**; Love in the Big City; Revolver; House Of The Seasons; Uprising | **Oh Seung-uk – Revolver**; Park Ri-woong – The Land of Morning Calm; Woo Min-ho – Harbin; E.oni – Love in the Big City; Lee Jong-pil – Escape |
| **Best New Director** | **Best Actor** |
| **Oh Jung-min – House of the Seasons**; Kim Se-hwi – Following; Nam Dong-hyeop – Handsome Guys; Lee Mi-rang – Concerning My Daughter; Jung Ji-hye – Jeong-sun | **Jo Jung-suk – Pilot as Han Jung-woo**; Yoon Joo-sang – The Land of Morning Calm as Yeong-guk; Lee Byung-hun – The Match as Cho Hun-hyun; Lee Hee-joon – Handsome Guys as Park Sang-goo; Hyun Bin – Harbin as An Jung-geun |
| **Best Actress** | **Best Supporting Actor** |
| **Jeon Do-yeon – Revolver as Ha Soo-young**; Kim Go-eun – Love in the Big City as Jae-hee; Kim Geum-soon – Jeong-sun as Jeong-sun; Song Hye-kyo – Dark Nuns as Sister Junia / Kang Seong-ae; Cho Yeo-jeong – Hidden Face as Shin Soo-yeon | **Yoo Jae-myung – Land of Happiness as Jeon Sang-doo**; Koo Kyo-hwan – Escape as Major Lee Hyun-sang; Park Jeong-min – Uprising as Lee Jong-ryeo; Jung Hae-in – I, the Executioner as Park Sun-woo; Jo Woo-jin – Harbin as Kim Sang-hyun |
| **Best Supporting Actress** | **Best New Actor** |
| **Claudia Kim – A Normal Family as Ji-su**; Gong Seung-yeon – Handsome Guys as Kim Mi-na; Lim Ji-yeon – Revolver as Jeong Yoon-sun; Jeon Yeo-been – Dark Nuns as Sister Michaela / Lee Soo-young; Han Sun-hwa – Pilot as Han Jung-mi | **Jung Sung-il – Uprising as Genshin**; Kang Seung-ho – House of the Seasons as Sung Jin; Noh Sang-hyun – Love in the Big City as Heung-soo; Moon Woo-jin – Dark Nuns as Hee-joon; Jang Sung-bum – Work to Do as Joon-hee |
| **Best New Actress** | **Best Screenplay** |
| **Roh Yoon-seo – Hear Me: Our Summer as Seo Yeo-reum**; Park Ji-hyun – Hidden Face as Mi-joo; Lee Myung-ha – Mimang as woman; Lee Hye-ri – Victory as Chu Pil-sun; Ha Seo-yoon – Streaming as Matilda | **Shin Chul, Park Chan-wook – Uprising**; Kim Hyung-joo, Yoon Jong-bin – The Match; Park Yi-woong – The Land of Morning Calm; Oh Seung-uk, Joo Byul – Revolver; Oh Jung-min – House of the Seasons |
| **Best Technical Achievement** | **Gucci Impact Award** |
| **Jo Yeong-wook (Score) – Uprising**; Park Byung-joo (VFX) – Wonderland; Yoo Sang-seop, Jang Han-seung (Stunt) – I, the Executioner; Lee Seo-jin (Makeup) – Pilot; Hong Kyung-pyo (Cinematography) – Harbin | **The Land of Morning Calm**; Blesser; Love in the Big City; The Voices Of The Silenced; Jeong-sun |

==== Films with multiple nominations ====
The following films received multiple nominations:

| Nominations | Films |
|---|---|
| 5 | Harbin |
| 5 | Love in the Big City |
| 5 | Revolver |
| 5 | Uprising |
| 4 | House of the Seasons |
| 4 | The Land of Morning Calm |
| 3 | Dark Nuns |
| 3 | Handsome Guys |
| 3 | Jeong-sun |
| 3 | Pilot |
| 2 | Escape |
| 2 | Hidden Face |
| 2 | I, the Executioner |
| 2 | The Match |

==== Films with multiple awards ====
The following films received multiple awards:

| Wins | Films |
|---|---|
| 3 | Uprising |
| 2 | Harbin |
| 2 | Revolver |

=== Broadcasting ===
Television category
**Grand Prize**
**Culinary Class Wars (entertainment program) (Netflix)**
| **Best Drama** | **Best Entertainment Program** |
| **When Life Gives You Tangerines (Netflix)**; Lovely Runner (tvN); The Tale of Lady Ok (JTBC); Doubt (MBC); The Trauma Code: Heroes on Call (Netflix) | **Punghyanggo (DdeunDdeun's YouTube Channel)**; Iron Girls (tvN); Stage Fighter (Mnet); The Rest of Ajo's Life (Choo Sung-hoon's YouTube Channel); Culinary Class Wars (Netflix) |
| **Best Educational Show** | **Best Director** |
| **Special-Hakjeon (SBS)**; Docuprime : Where's My Last Home (EBS 1TV); Just Family (Wavve); Saddle the Wind with You 2 (MBC Wonju); Shaman: Whispers from the Dead (TVING) | **Song Yeon-hwa – Doubt**; Kim Won-seok – When Life Gives You Tangerines; Kim Hee-won – Light Shop; Lee Do-yoon – The Trauma Code: Heroes on Call; Jung Ji-in – Jeongnyeon: The Star Is Born |
| **Best Actor** | **Best Actress** |
| **Ju Ji-hoon – The Trauma Code: Heroes on Call as Baek Kang-hyuk**; Park Bo-gum – When Life Gives You Tangerines as Yang Gwan-sik; Byeon Woo-seok – Lovely Runner as Ryu Sun-jae; Lee Joon-hyuk – Dongjae, the Good or the Bastard as Seo Dong-jae; Han Suk-kyu – Doubt as Jang Tae-su | **Kim Tae-ri – Jeongnyeon: The Star Is Born as Yoon Jeong-nyeon**; Go Min-si – The Frog as Yoo Seong-a; Kim Hye-yoon – Lovely Runner as Im Sol; IU – When Life Gives You Tangerines as Oh Ae-sun / Yang Geum-myeong; Jang Na-ra – Good Partner as Cha Eun-kyung |
| **Best Supporting Actor** | **Best Supporting Actress** |
| **Choi Dae-hoon – When Life Gives You Tangerines as Bu Sang-gil**; Kim Jun-han – Good Partner as Jung Woo-jin; Roh Jae-won – Squid Game 2 as Nam-gyu (Player 124); Yoon Kyung-ho – The Trauma Code: Heroes on Call as Han Yoo-rim; Hyeon Bong-sik – Dongjae, the Good or the Bastard as Jo Byeong-gun | **Yeom Hye-ran – When Life Gives You Tangerines as Jeon Gwang-rye**; Kim Gook-hee – Family Matters as Oh Gil-ja; Kim Jae-hwa – The Tale of Lady Ok as Mak Sim; Oh Gyeong-hwa – Jeongnyeon: The Star Is Born as Yoon Jung-ja; Jung Eun-chae – Jeongnyeon: The Star Is Born as Moon Ok-gyeong |
| **Best New Actor** | **Best New Actress** |
| **Choo Young-woo – The Tale of Lady Ok as Song Seo-in / Cheon Seung-hwi / Sung Yoon-gyeom**; Kim Jeong-jin – Doubt as Choi Young-min; Song Geon-hee – Lovely Runner as Kim Tae-sung; Cha Woo-min – Study Group as Pi Han-wool; Heo Nam-jun – Your Honor as Kim Sang-hyuk | **Chae Won-bin – Doubt as Jang Ha-bin**; Kim Tae-yeon – When Life Gives You Tangerines as Child Ae-sun; Roh Jeong-eui – The Witch as Park Mi-jeong; Jo Yoon-su – The Tyrant as Chae Ja-kyung; Ha Young – The Trauma Code: Heroes on Call as Cheon Jang-mi |
| **Best Male Variety Performer** | **Best Female Variety Performer** |
| **Shin Dong-yup**; Kim Won-hoon; Dex; Sung Si-kyung; Yoo Jae-suk | **Lee Soo-ji**; Jang Do-yeon; Ji Ye-eun; Haewon; Hong Jin-kyung |
| **Best Screenplay** | **Best Technical Achievement** |
| **Lim Sang-choon – When Life Gives You Tangerines**; Kim Jung-min – Family Matters; Park Ji-sook – The Tale of Lady Ok; Lee Si-eun – Lovely Runner; Choi Yu-na – Good Partner | **Jang Yeong-gyu (Score) – Jeongnyeon: The Star Is Born**; Lee Young-joo (Production Design) – Culinary Class Wars; Lee Jin-suk, Lee Deok-hoon (Cinematography) – Doubt; Jo Dong-hyuk (Stunt) – Study Group; Hong Jung-ho, Lee Seung-je, Kim Dae-joon, Kim Jung-min (VFX) – Hellbound 2 |

==== Broadcasting programs with multiple nominations ====
The following broadcasting programs received multiple nominations:

| Nominations | Broadcasting programs |
|---|---|
| 8 | When Life Gives You Tangerines |
| 6 | Doubt |
| 5 | Jeongnyeon: The Star Is Born |
| 5 | Lovely Runner |
| 5 | The Trauma Code: Heroes on Call |
| 4 | The Tale of Lady Ok |
| 3 | Good Partner |
| 2 | Culinary Class Wars |
| 2 | Dongjae, the Good or the Bastard |
| 2 | Family Matters |
| 2 | Study Group |

==== Broadcasting programs with multiple awards ====
The following broadcasting programs received multiple awards:

| Wins | Broadcasting programs |
|---|---|
| 4 | When Life Gives You Tangerines |
| 2 | Doubt |
| 2 | Jeongnyeon: The Star Is Born |

=== Theater ===
Theater category
| **Baeksang Theater** | **Young Theater** |
| **Tungso-sori – Seoul Metropolitan Theater**; Gumi-sik – Dolpagu; Jews of Malta – Extreme Jeok; The Eldest Daughters – Project Island; Jincheon recommended play Jincheonsa recommended by Jincheon – Cornerstone | **Gongnori Club (theater) – Dried Pepper and Peach Scent Lipstick**; Common Theatre (theater) – Romance of Extinction; A.N.D Theatre (theater) – Yuwon; Lee Seung-won (director) – The Segal; Lee Tae-rin (director) – Choi Young-woo, a Korean born in 1923 |
**Best Acting**
**Kwak Ji-sook – Jews of Malta**; Lee Jin-kyung – Women of the Earth; Jeong Sae-byeol – The Sound of a Flute; Cho Young-kyu – Jincheon recommended play Jincheonsa recommended by Jincheon; Choi Hee-jin – All

=== Special awards ===
The voting for the Prizm Popularity Award was held from April 23, at 12:00 (KST) to May 2, at 16:00 (KST) via Prizm app.

| Awards | Recipient |
|---|---|
| **Prizm Popularity Award (Male)** | Byeon Woo-seok |
| **Prizm Popularity Award (Female)** | Kim Hye-yoon |
