= 46th Blue Dragon Film Awards =

2025 edition of South Korean film awards

- Official poster
- Awarded for: Excellence in cinematic achievements
- Awarded by: Sports Chosun
- Announced on: October 20, 2025
- Presented on: November 19, 2025
- Site: KBS Hall, Yeouido, Seoul
- Hosted by: Han Ji-min; Lee Je-hoon
- Organized by: Sports Chosun (a sister brand of The Chosun Ilbo)
- Official website: blueaward.co.kr

Highlights
- Best Film: No Other Choice
- Popular Star Award: Park Jin-young; Hyun Bin; Son Ye-jin; Im Yoon-ah
- Best Director: Park Chan-wook; No Other Choice
- Best Actor: Hyun Bin; Harbin
- Best Actress: Son Ye-jin; No Other Choice
- Most awards: No Other Choice (6)
- Most nominations: No Other Choice (12)

Television coverage
- Network: KBS; YouTube; Naver NOW
- Viewership: 624,000 People; Ratings: 3.4%

The 46th Blue Dragon Film Awards (Korean: 제46회 청룡영화상) is an annual South Korean film award ceremony organized by Sports Chosun. Hosted by Han Ji-min and Lee Je-hoon, it was held on November 19, 2025, at KBS Hall in Yeouido, Seoul, and broadcast live on KBS2 and online platforms. The nominees for 15 competitive categories were announced on October 20, 2025.

== Nominees and winners ==
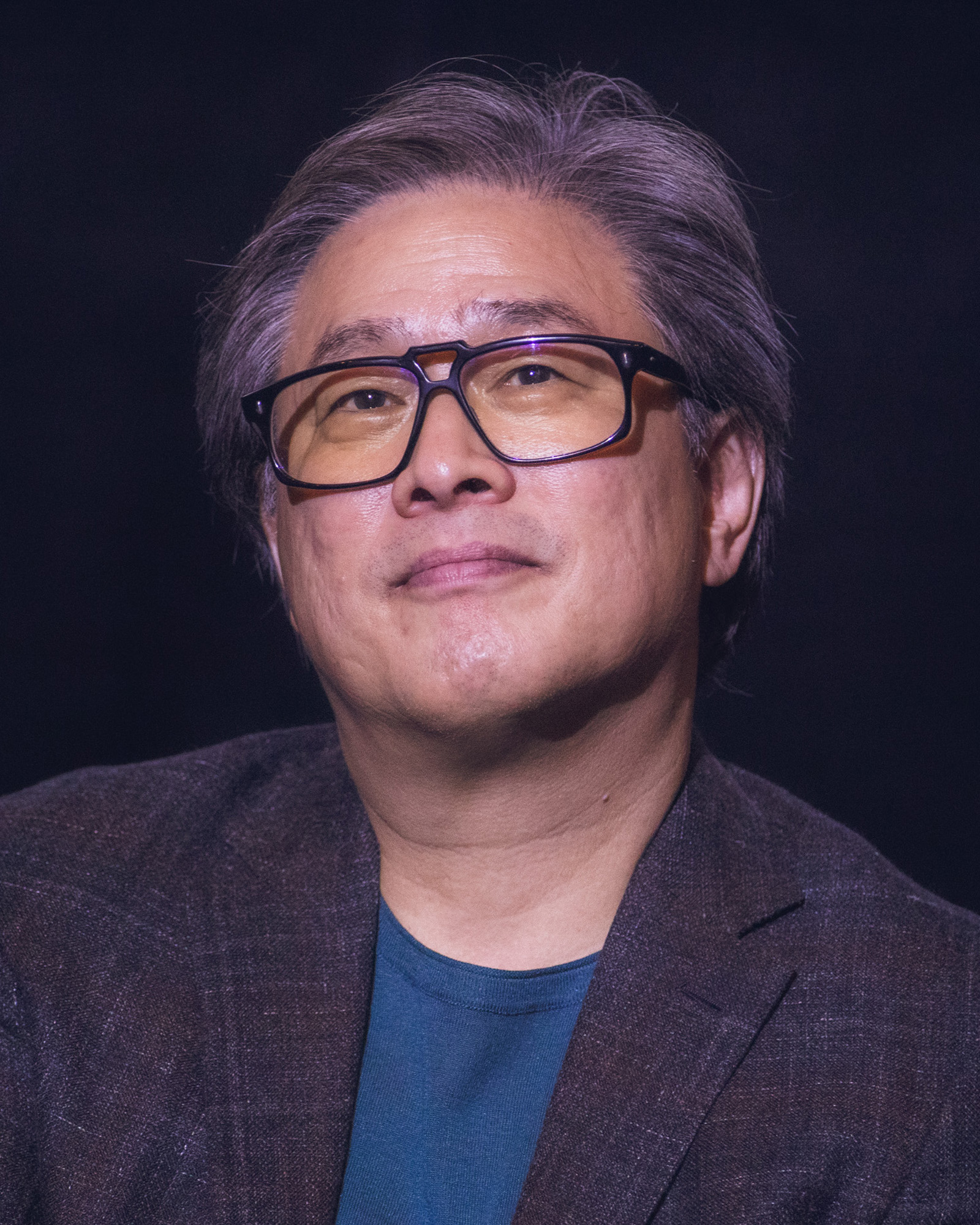
Park Chan-wook, winner of the Best Director Award

The nominees for the awards were announced in 15 categories on October 20, 2025.

Winners are listed first, highlighted in boldface, and indicated with a double dagger (‡).

| **Best Film** | **Best Director** |
| **No Other Choice** ‡; The Ugly; My Daughter is a Zombie; The Old Woman with the Knife; Harbin | **Park Chan-wook – No Other Choice** ‡; Min Kyu-dong – The Old Woman with the Knife; Yeon Sang-ho – The Ugly; Woo Min-ho – Harbin; Pil Gam-seong – My Daughter is a Zombie |
| **Best Actor** | **Best Actress** |
| **Hyun Bin – Harbin** ‡; Park Jeong-min – The Ugly; Sul Kyung-gu – A Normal Family; Lee Byung-hun – No Other Choice; Jo Jung-suk – My Daughter is a Zombie | **Son Ye-jin – No Other Choice** ‡; Song Hye-kyo – Dark Nuns; Lee Jae-in – Hi-Five; Lee Hye-young – The Old Woman with the Knife; Lim Yoona – Pretty Crazy |
| **Best Supporting Actor** | **Best Supporting Actress** |
| **Lee Sung-min – No Other Choice** ‡; Kwon Hae-hyo – The Ugly; Kim Sung-cheol – The Old Woman with the Knife; Park Jeong-min – Harbin; Yoon Kyung-ho – My Daughter is a Zombie | **Park Ji-hyun – Hidden Face** ‡; Shin Hyun-been – The Ugly; Yeom Hye-ran – No Other Choice; Lee Jung-eun – My Daughter is a Zombie; Jeon Yeo-been – Dark Nuns |
| **Best New Actor** | **Best New Actress** |
| **Ahn Bo-hyun – Pretty Crazy** ‡; Park Jin-young – Hi-Five; Ahn Hyo-seop – Omniscient Reader: The Prophecy; Jung Sung-il – Uprising; Cho Yoo-hyun – 3670 | **Kim Do-yeon – Idiot Girls and School Ghost: School Anniversary** ‡; Kim Min-ju – Hear Me: Our Summer; Roh Yoon-seo – Hear Me: Our Summer; Lee Sun-bin – Noise; Hong Ye-ji – A Normal Family |
| **Best New Director** | **Best Screenplay** |
| **Kim Hye-young – It’s Okay!** ‡; Kim Min-ha – Idiot Girls and School Ghost: School Anniversary; Kim Soo-jin – Noise; Park Joon-ho – 3670; Jang Byung-ki – When This Summer Is Over | **Kim Hyung-joo, Yoon Jong-bin – The Match** ‡; Park Chan-wook, Don McKellar, Lee Kyoung-mi, Lee Ja-hye – No Other Choice; Yeon Sang-ho – The Ugly; Shin Cheol, Park Chan-wook – Uprising; Kang Hyeong-cheol – Hi-Five |
| **Best Editing** | **Best Cinematography and Lighting** |
| **Nam Na-yeong – Hi-Five** ‡; Kim Sang-bum – The Match; Kim Sang-bum, Kim Ho-bin – No Other Choice; Park Ju-ae – The Ugly; Kim Man-geun – Harbin | **Hong Kyung-pyo, Park Jeong-woo – Harbin** ‡; Kim Woo-hyung, Kim Min-jae – No Other Choice; Pyo Sang-woo, Song Hyeon-seok – The Ugly; Ju Sung-rim, Choi Jong-ha – Uprising; Choi Chan-min, Yoo Seok-moon – Hi-Five |
| **Best Art Direction** | **Best Music** |
| **Lee Na-kyum – Uprising** ‡; Jeong Eun-young – The Match; Ryu Seong-hie – No Other Choice; Lee Mok-won – The Ugly; Kim Bo-muk – Harbin | **Jo Yeong-wook – No Other Choice** ‡; Jo Yeong-wook, Lee Myeong-ro, Kwon So-hyun, Shin Hyun-ji – Uprising; Kim Tae-seong – My Daughter is a Zombie; Jo Yeong-wook – Harbin; Kim Joon-seok – Hi-Five |
| **Technical Award** | **Chung Jung-won Best Short Film** |
| **Jo Sang-gyeong (Costume) – No Other Choice** ‡; Park Yong-ki (Sound) – Noise; Jo Tae-hee (Make-up) – The Ugly; Kim Woo-cheol (VFX) – Omniscient Reader: The Prophecy; Seo Jeong-ju (Martial Arts) – The Old Woman with the Knife | **Rotary’s Hancheol** ‡; National Route 7; Flower play; Looking for Song Seok-ju; First Summer |
| **Chung Jung-won Popular Star Award** | **Audience Choice Award for Most Popular Film** |
| **Park Jin-young – Hi-Five**‡; **Hyun Bin – Harbin**‡; **Son Ye-jin – No Other Choice**‡; **Im Yoon-ah – Pretty Crazy**‡ | **My Daughter is a Zombie ‡**; Harbin (2nd); The Firefighters (3rd); Yadang: The Snitch (4th); No Other Choice (5th) |

=== Films with multiple nominations and awards ===
Films with multiple nominations
| Nominations | Films |
|---|---|
| 12 | No Other Choice |
| 10 | The Ugly |
| 8 | Harbin |
| 6 | Hi-Five |
| 6 | My Daughter is a Zombie |
| 5 | The Old Woman with the Knife |
| 5 | Uprising |
| 3 | Noise |
| 3 | The Match |
| 2 | A Normal Family |
| 2 | Dark Nuns |
| 2 | Hear Me: Our Summer |
| 2 | Idiot Girls and School Ghost: School Anniversary |
| 2 | Omniscient Reader: The Prophecy |
| 2 | Pretty Crazy |

Films with multiple awards
| Wins | Films |
|---|---|
| 6 | No Other Choice |
| 2 | Harbin |
