= Lee Byung-hun filmography =

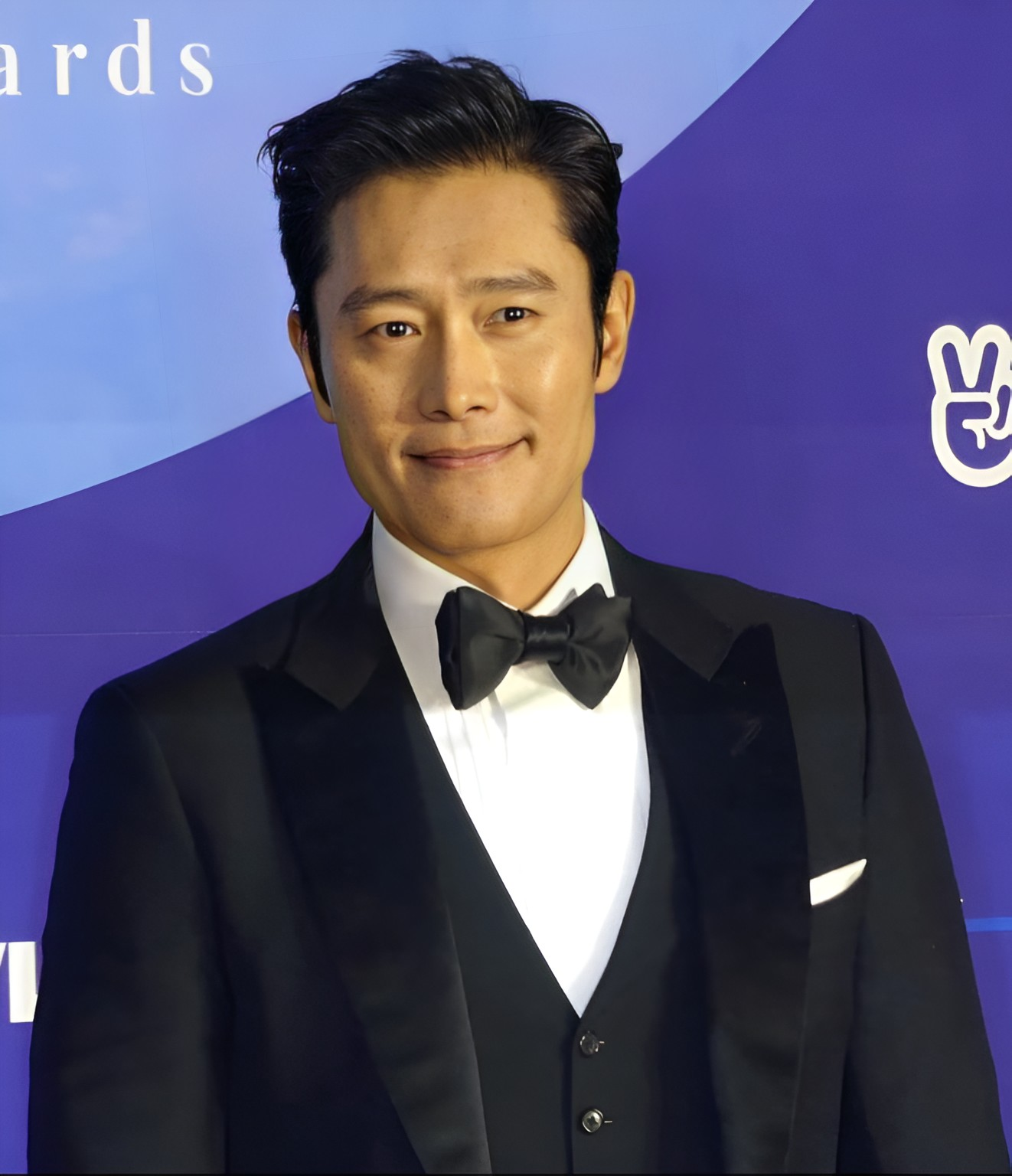
- Lee in 2019
- Film: 38
- Television series: 27
- Web series: 1
- Web show: 1
- Documentary: 1
- Music videos: 2
- Narrating: 1
- Others: 2

Lee Byung-hun (Korean: 이병헌, born July 12, 1970) is a South Korean actor. Lee began his career on television in 1991 and made his film debut in 1995 with Who Drives Me Crazy and Runaway, and subsequently appeared in Kill the Love (1996), Elegy of the Earth (1997) and The Harmonium in My Memory (1999). He gained wider recognition for playing South Korean sergeant Lee Soo-hyeok in Park Chan-wook's Joint Security Area (2000). He followed this with leading roles in Bungee Jumping of Their Own (2001), Addicted (2002), and Everybody Has Secrets (2004). On television, he starred in the series Beautiful Days (2001) and All In (2003).

In 2005, Lee starred as an enforcer in Kim Jee-woon's crime drama A Bittersweet Life. He later appeared in Once in a Summer (2006) and played the antagonist Park Chang-yi, known as "the Bad", in Kim Jee-woon's western action film The Good, the Bad, the Weird (2008). In 2009, he starred as Kim Hyun-jun in the television series Iris and made his Hollywood film debut as Storm Shadow in G.I. Joe: The Rise of Cobra. The following year, he played an NIS agent seeking revenge in Kim Jee-woon's thriller I Saw the Devil.

Lee portrayed the dual roles of King Gwanghae and the beggar Ha-sun in the historical drama Masquerade (2012). In 2013, he reprised his role as Storm Shadow in G.I. Joe: Retaliation and appeared in the action comedy Red 2. He continued his work in Hollywood with roles as the T-1000 in Terminator Genisys (2015) and Billy Rocks in The Magnificent Seven (2016). During this period, he also starred in the South Korean films Inside Men (2015) and Master (2016), and appeared in Memories of the Sword (2015), The Fortress (2017) and Keys to the Heart (2018).

In 2018, Lee returned to television as Eugene Choi in the period drama Mr. Sunshine. He subsequently starred in the disaster film Ashfall (2019), portrayed Kim Gyu-pyeong in the political drama The Man Standing Next (2020), and appeared in Emergency Declaration (2021). In 2021, he began portraying Hwang In-ho, also known as the Front Man, in the survival drama series Squid Game, initially in a special appearance before joining the main cast for its second and third seasons. He also starred in the television series Our Blues (2022) and in the film Concrete Utopia (2023). In 2025, he portrayed Go player Cho Hun-hyun in The Match, voiced Gwi-Ma in the animated film KPop Demon Hunters, and starred in Park Chan-wook's No Other Choice.

== Film ==
Year	Title	Role	Notes	Ref.
1995	Who Drives Me Crazy	Lee Jong-du		
1995	Runaway	Lee Dong-ho		
1996	Kill the Love	Love		
1997	Elegy of the Earth	Park Jong-man		
1999	The Harmonium in My Memory	Kang Soo-ha		
2000	Joint Security Area	Lee Soo-hyeok		
2001	Bungee Jumping of Their Own	Seo In-woo		
2002	My Beautiful Girl, Mari	Adult Nam-woo	Voice	
2002	Addicted	Dae-jun		
2004	Everybody Has Secrets	Choi Su-hyeon		
2004	Three Extremes	Ryu Ji-ho	Segment: "Cut"	
2005	A Bittersweet Life	Kim Sun-woo		
2006	Once in a Summer	Yun Suk-young		
2007	Hero	Kang Min-woo	Cameo	
2008	The Good, the Bad, the Weird	Park Chang-yi, the Bad		
2009	I Come with the Rain	Su Dongpo		
2009	G.I. Joe: The Rise of Cobra	Thomas Arashikage / Storm Shadow	Hollywood debut	
2010	I Saw the Devil	Kim Soo-hyeon		
2010	The Influence	W	Internet film	
2010	Iris: The Movie	Kim Hyun-jun		
2012	Masquerade	King Gwanghae / Beggar Ha-sun		
2013	G.I. Joe: Retaliation	Thomas Arashikage / Storm Shadow		
2013	Red 2	Han Cho-bai		
2015	Terminator Genisys	Cop / T-1000		
2015	Memories of the Sword	Deok-gi / Song Yoo-baek		
2015	Inside Men	Ahn Sang-goo		
2016	Misconduct	The Accountant		
2016	The Age of Shadows	Jeong Chae-san	Special appearance	
2016	The Magnificent Seven	Billy Rocks		
2016	Master	President Jin		
2017	A Single Rider	Kang Jae-hoon		
2017	The Fortress	Choe Myeong-gil		
2018	Keys to the Heart	Jo-ha		
2019	Ashfall	Lee Joon-pyeong		
2020	The Man Standing Next	Kim Gyu-pyeong		
2021	Emergency Declaration	Jae-hyuk		
2023	Concrete Utopia	Young Tak		
2025	The Match	Cho Hun-hyun		
2025	KPop Demon Hunters	Gwi-Ma	Voice	
2025	No Other Choice	Yoo Man-soo		
TBA	K.O. Club			

== Television series ==
Year	Title	Role	Notes	Ref.
1991	Flower That Never Wilt	Yoon Dal-hoon		
1991	Asphalt My Hometown	Jinwoo		
1992	Days of Sunshine	Choi Hyung-man		
1992	Morning Without Parting	Seok-woo / Byeong-ho		
1992	Tomorrow Love	Shin Bum-soo		
1993	The Sorrow of the Survivor	Yi Ja-myung		
1993	Wild Chrysanthemum	Gi-hoon		
1993	Police	Oh Hae-sung		
1994	The Fragrance of Love	Kim Jun-ho		
1995	Asphalt Man	Kang Dong-joon		
1995	Son of Wind	Chang Hong-pyo		
1997	Beautiful My Lady	Hwang Jun-ho		
1997	I Want		One-act drama	
1997	Wedding Dress	Hyung Suk		
1998	White Nights 3.98	Min Gyeong-bin		
1999	Happy Together	Suh Tae-poong		
1999	Love Story - Story 1: Sunflower	Tae-sung	Drama special	
1999	Sally is Back	Cafe CEO	Drama special	
2000	Road	Choi Woo-sik	Drama special	
2001	Beautiful Days	Lee Min-chul		
2003	All In	Kim In-ha		
2009	Iris	Kim Hyun-jun		
2011	Diplomat Kosaku Kuroda	John	Special appearance	
2018	Mr. Sunshine	Eugene Choi		
2021–2025	Squid Game	Hwang In-ho	Special appearance (season 1); Main role (season 2–3)	
2022	Our Blues	Lee Dong-seok		
TBA	Koreans			

== Web shows ==
Year	Title	Role	Notes	Ref.
2021	Saturday Night Live Korea	Host	Episodes 1	

== Documentary ==
Year	Title	Role
2013	SBS Special	Himself (Note: SBS produced a documentary about Lee Byung-hun aired in July 2013 which explained how he was able to become a world star and how this opened the door for other domestic celebrities to participate in overseas movie production.)

== Narration ==
Year	Title	Note	Ref.
2012	The Final Empire	Documentary	

== Music video appearances ==
Year	Song title	Artist	Ref.
1998	"To Heaven"	Jo Sung-mo	
1998	"Immortal Love"	Jo Sung-mo	
2017	"I Luv It"	Psy	

== Other appearances ==
Year	Title	Role	Ref.
2006	Lost Planet: Extreme Condition	Wayne Holden	
2013	CGV 4DX trailer	Himself	
