= List of awards and nominations received by Lee Byung-hun =

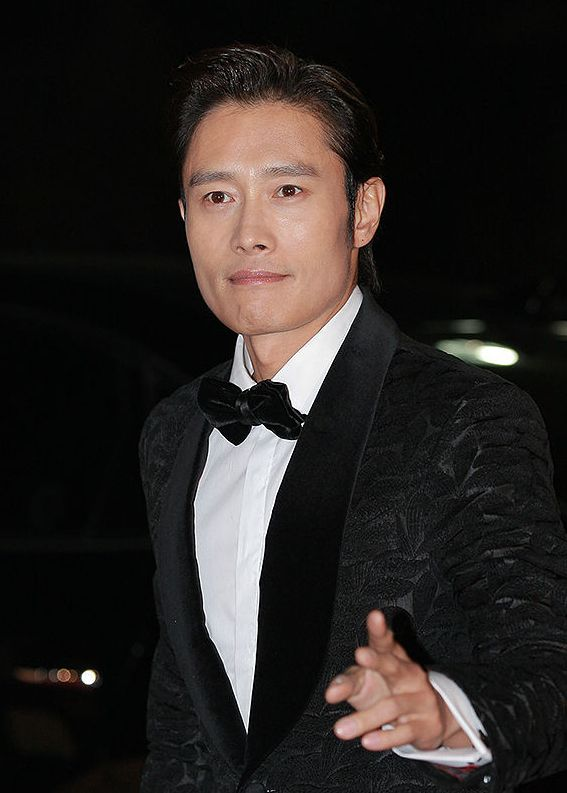
Lee at the 34th Blue Dragon Film Awards in 2013

This is a list of awards and nominations received by South Korean actor Lee Byung-hun.

== Awards and nominations ==
Name of the award ceremony, year presented, category, nominee(s) of the award, and the result of the nomination
Award	Year	Category	Nominee(s)	Result	Ref.
A-Awards	2012	Style Award	Lee Byung-hun	Won	
A-Awards	2022	A-Awards – Impression	Our Blues	Won	
APAN Star Awards	2016	Hallyu Global Star Award	Lee Byung-hun	Won	
APAN Star Awards	2018	Grand Prize (Daesang) (Note: A Daesang (Korean: 대상), which translates to "Grand Prize", is the highest honor given out at South Korean award ceremonies.)	Mr. Sunshine	Won	
APAN Star Awards	2018	K-Star Award	Mr. Sunshine	Nominated	
Asia Artist Awards	2018	Grand Prize (Daesang)	Mr. Sunshine	Won	
Asia Artist Awards	2018	Artist of the Year	Lee Byung-hun	Won	
Asia Artist Awards	2018	Korea Tourism Appreciation Award	Lee Byung-hun	Won	
Asia Artist Awards	2018	Fabulous Award	Lee Byung-hun	Won	
Asian Film Awards	2008	Best Supporting Actor	The Good, the Bad, the Weird	Nominated	
Asian Film Awards	2016	Best Actor	Inside Men	Won	
Asian Film Awards	2020	Best Actor	The Man Standing Next	Won	
Asian Film Awards	2021	Asian Film Excellence Award	Lee Byung-hun	Won	
Asian World Film Festival	2025	Snow Leopard Excellent Cinematic Achievement Award	Lee Byung-hun	Won	
Asia Model Awards	2010	Asia Star Award	Lee Byung-hun	Won	
Asia-Pacific Producers' Network Awards	2010	APN Award	Lee Byung-hun	Won	
Asia Pacific Screen Awards	2013	Best Actor	Masquerade	Won	
Asia Society Game Changer	2021	Entertainment Game Changer Award	Lee Byung-hun	Won	
Astra Film Awards	2026	Best Actor in a Motion Picture Comedy or Musical	No Other Choice	Nominated	
Baeksang Arts Awards	1996	Best Actor – Television	Son of Wind	Won	
Baeksang Arts Awards	1996	Best New Actor – Film	Runaway	Nominated	
Baeksang Arts Awards	2000	Best Actor – Television	Happy Together	Nominated	
Baeksang Arts Awards	2001	Best Actor – Film	Bungee Jumping of Their Own	Nominated	
Baeksang Arts Awards	2002	Best Actor – Television	Beautiful Days	Nominated	
Baeksang Arts Awards	2003	Best Actor – Television	All In	Won	
Baeksang Arts Awards	2006	Best Actor – Film	A Bittersweet Life	Won	
Baeksang Arts Awards	2010	Best Actor – Television	Iris	Won	
Baeksang Arts Awards	2011	Grand Prize (Daesang) for Film	I Saw the Devil	Won	
Baeksang Arts Awards	2011	Best Actor – Film	I Saw the Devil	Nominated	
Baeksang Arts Awards	2013	Best Actor – Film	Masquerade	Nominated	
Baeksang Arts Awards	2016	Best Actor – Film	Inside Men	Won	
Baeksang Arts Awards	2017	Best Actor – Film	Master	Nominated	
Baeksang Arts Awards	2019	Best Actor – Television	Mr. Sunshine	Won	
Baeksang Arts Awards	2020	Best Actor – Film	The Man Standing Next	Won	
Baeksang Arts Awards	2023	Best Actor – Television	Our Blues	Nominated	
Baeksang Arts Awards	2024	Best Actor – Film	Concrete Utopia	Nominated	
Baeksang Arts Awards	2025	Best Actor – Film	The Match	Nominated	
Baeksang Arts Awards	2026	Best Actor – Film	No Other Choice	Nominated	
Blue Dragon Film Awards	1995	Best New Actor	Who Drives Me Crazy	Nominated	
Blue Dragon Film Awards	2001	Best Actor	Bungee Jumping of Their Own	Nominated	
Blue Dragon Film Awards	2001	Popular Star Award	Bungee Jumping of Their Own	Won	
Blue Dragon Film Awards	2002	Best Actor	Addicted	Nominated	
Blue Dragon Film Awards	2005	Best Actor	A Bittersweet Life	Nominated	
Blue Dragon Film Awards	2008	Best Actor	The Good, the Bad, the Weird	Nominated	
Blue Dragon Film Awards	2009	Popular Star Award	G.I. Joe: The Rise of Cobra	Won	
Blue Dragon Film Awards	2010	Best Actor	I Saw the Devil	Nominated	
Blue Dragon Film Awards	2012	Best Actor	Masquerade	Nominated	
Blue Dragon Film Awards	2013	Popular Star Award	G.I. Joe: Retaliation, Red 2	Won	
Blue Dragon Film Awards	2016	Best Actor	Inside Men	Won	
Blue Dragon Film Awards	2017	Best Actor	The Fortress	Nominated	
Blue Dragon Film Awards	2021	Best Actor	The Man Standing Next	Nominated	
Blue Dragon Film Awards	2022	Best Actor	Emergency Declaration	Nominated	
Blue Dragon Film Awards	2023	Best Actor	Concrete Utopia	Won	
Blue Dragon Film Awards	2025	Best Actor	No Other Choice	Nominated	
Blue Dragon Series Awards	2025	Best Actor	Squid Game 2	Nominated	
Bucheon International Fantastic Film Festival	2013	Producers’ Choice Award	Masquerade	Won	
Buil Film Awards	2010	Best Actor	I Saw the Devil	Nominated	
Buil Film Awards	2013	Best Actor	Masquerade	Nominated	
Buil Film Awards	2016	Best Actor	Inside Men	Won	
Buil Film Awards	2020	Best Actor	The Man Standing Next	Won	
Buil Film Awards	2023	Best Actor	Concrete Utopia	Won	
Buil Film Awards	2025	Best Actor	The Match	Won	
Buil Film Awards	2026	Best Actor	No Other Choice	Nominated	
Busan Film Critics Awards	2000	Best Actor	Joint Security Area	Won	
Busan Film Critics Awards	2012	Best Actor	Masquerade	Won	
CineAsia Awards	2012	Star of the Year	Lee Byung-hun	Won	
China Music Awards and Asian Influential Awards	2010	Best Asian Influential International Actor	Lee Byung-hun	Won	
Chunsa Film Art Awards	1995	Best New Actor	Who Drives Me Crazy	Won	
Chunsa Film Art Awards	2005	Best Actor	A Bittersweet Life	Won	
Chunsa Film Art Awards	2006	Korean Cultural Award	Lee Byung-hun	Won	
Chunsa Film Art Awards	2007	Best Actor	Once in a Summer	Nominated	
Chunsa Film Art Awards	2016	Best Actor	Inside Men	Nominated	
Chunsa Film Art Awards	2018	Best Actor	The Fortress	Nominated	
Chunsa Film Art Awards	2020	Best Actor	The Man Standing Next	Won	
Chunsa Film Art Awards	2025	Best Actor	No Other Choice	Won	
Director's Cut Awards	2016	Best Actor	Inside Men	Won	
Director's Cut Awards	2022	Best Actor in Film	The Man Standing Next	Won	
Director's Cut Awards	2024	Best Actor in Film	Concrete Utopia	Won	
Director's Cut Awards	2025	Best Actor in Film	The Match	Won	
Director's Cut Awards	2026	Best Actor in Film	No Other Choice	Nominated	
DiscussingFilm's Global Film Critics Awards	2026	Best Actor	No Other Choice	Nominated	
Florida Film Critics Circle	2025	Best Actor	No Other Choice	Nominated	
Golden Cinematography Awards	1996	Best New Actor	Runaway	Won	
Golden Cinematography Awards	2001	Most Popular Actor	Joint Security Area	Won	
Golden Cinematography Awards	2018	Acting Grand Prize	Keys to the Heart	Won	
Golden Globe Awards	2026	Best Actor – Musical or Comedy	No Other Choice	Nominated	
Green Planet Movie Awards	2012	10 Best International Actors of the Decade (Asia)	Lee Byung-hun	Won	
Gotham Independent Film Awards	2025	Outstanding Lead Performance	No Other Choice	Nominated	
Grand Bell Awards	1996	Best New Actor	Runaway	Won	
Grand Bell Awards	2000	Best Actor	The Harmonium in My Memory	Nominated	
Grand Bell Awards	2001	Netizen's Popularity Award	Joint Security Area, Bungee Jumping of Their Own	Won	
Grand Bell Awards	2001	Best Actor	Bungee Jumping of Their Own	Nominated	
Grand Bell Awards	2005	Best Actor	A Bittersweet Life	Nominated	
Grand Bell Awards	2010	Best Actor	I Saw the Devil	Nominated	
Grand Bell Awards	2012	Best Actor	Masquerade	Won	
Grand Bell Awards	2012	Popularity Award	Masquerade	Won	
Grand Bell Awards	2016	Best Actor	Inside Men	Won	
Grand Bell Awards	2018	Best Actor	The Fortress	Nominated	
Grand Bell Awards	2020	Best Actor	Ashfall	Won	
Grand Bell Awards	2022	Best Actor	Emergency Declaration	Nominated	
Grand Bell Awards	2023	Best Actor	Concrete Utopia	Won	
Huading Awards	2013	Best Foreign Actor	Lee Byung-hun	Won	
Huading Awards	2021	Best International Actor	Lee Byung-hun	Nominated	
International Drama Festival in Tokyo	2010	Best Actor in Asia	Iris	Won	
Japan Jewelry Wearer Awards	2010	Special Award	Lee Byung-hun	Won	
KALH Honors	2025	Actor Honor	Lee Byung-hun	Honored	
KBS Drama Awards	1992	Best New Actor	Day of Sunshine, Morning Without Parting, Tomorrow Love	Won	
KBS Drama Awards	1993	Excellence Award, Actor	Wild Chrysanthemum, Tomorrow Love, The Sorrow of the Survivor	Won	
KBS Drama Awards	1993	Popularity Actor Award	Wild Chrysanthemum, Tomorrow Love, The Sorrow of the Survivor	Nominated	
KBS Drama Awards	1995	Top Excellence Award, Actor	Son Of Wind	Nominated	
KBS Drama Awards	1995	Excellence Award, Actor	Son Of Wind	Won	
KBS Drama Awards	2009	Grand Prize (Daesang)	Iris	Won	
KBS Drama Awards	2009	Top Excellence Award, Actor	Iris	Nominated	
KBS Drama Awards	2009	Excellence Award, Actor in a Mid-length Drama	Iris	Nominated	
KBS Drama Awards	2009	Netizen Award, Actor	Iris	Won	
KBS Drama Awards	2009	Best Couple Award with Kim Tae-hee	Iris	Won	
Korean Association of Film Critics Awards	2005	Best Actor	A Bittersweet Life	Won	
Korean Association of Film Critics Awards	2012	Achievement Award	Lee Byung-hun	Won	
Korean Association of Film Critics Awards	2016	Best Actor	Inside Men	Won	
Korean Association of Film Critics Awards	2020	Best Actor	The Man Standing Next	Won	
Korea Broadcasting Association Awards	2003	Best Actor	All In	Won	
Korean Culture and Entertainment Awards	1995	Best Actor in TV	Son Of Wind	Won	
Korean Culture and Entertainment Awards	2000	Best Actor in Film	Joint Security Area	Won	
Korea Drama Awards	2010	Best Actor	Iris	Nominated	
Korea Drama Awards	2018	Grand Prize (Daesang)	Mr. Sunshine	Nominated	
Korean Film Producers Association Awards	2016	Best Actor	Inside Men	Won	
Korean Film Producers Association Awards	2025	Best Actor	The Match, No Other Choice	Won	
Korea First Brand Awards	2026	Male Actor (Film)	Lee Byung-hun	Won	
Korea Visual Arts Festival	2001	Photo Genic Award in TV	Beautiful Days	Won	
Marie Claire Film Festival	2016	Pioneer Award	Inside Men	Won	
Marie Claire Asia Star Awards	2016	Actor of the Year Award	Inside Men	Won	
Marie Claire Asia Star Awards	2023	Actor of the Year Award	Concrete Utopia	Won	
Marie Claire Asia Star Awards	2025	Actor of the Year Award	Lee Byung-hun	Won	
Max Movie Awards	2016	Best Actor	Inside Men	Nominated	
Midnight Critics Circle	2026	Best Actor	No Other Choice	Nominated	
National Assembly by the Mass Culture & Media Research Group	2009	Special Commendation	Iris	Won	
New York Asian Film Festival	2016	Star Asia Award	Inside Men	Won	
New York Film Critics Online	2025	Best Actor	No Other Choice	Nominated	
Newport Beach Film Festival	2025	Artist of Distinction Award	Lee Byung-hun	Honored	
Newsis K-Expo Cultural Awards	2026	Minister of Foreign Affairs Award	Lee Byung-hun	Won	
North Dakota Film Society	2026	Best Actor	No Other Choice	Nominated	
Republic of Korea Top Star Award	2015	Top Star Award	Inside Men	Won	
SACF Artists of the Year Awards	2020	Outstanding Artist for a Film	The Man Standing Next	Won	
SBS Drama Awards	1994	Popularity Award	The Fragrance of Love	Won	
SBS Drama Awards	1999	Top 10 Stars Award	Happy Together	Won	
SBS Drama Awards	1999	Top Excellence Award, Actor	Happy Together	Nominated	
SBS Drama Awards	2000	Big Star Award	—N/a	Won	
SBS Drama Awards	2001	Top Excellence Award, Actor	Beautiful Days	Nominated	
SBS Drama Awards	2001	Excellence Award, Actor in a Drama Special	Beautiful Days	Nominated	
SBS Drama Awards	2001	Top 10 Stars Award	Beautiful Days	Won	
SBS Drama Awards	2001	i-Star Award	Beautiful Days	Won	
SBS Drama Awards	2003	Grand Prize (Daesang)	All In	Won	
SBS Drama Awards	2003	Top Excellence Award, Actor	All In	Nominated	
SBS Drama Awards	2003	Top 10 Stars Award	All In	Won	
Seoul Arts & Culture Award	2010	Best TV Actor	Iris	Won	
Seoul International Drama Awards	2010	Outstanding Korean Actor	Iris	Won	
Style Icon Awards	2010	Style Icon of the Year	Lee Byung-hun	Won	
The New York Times Magazine	2025	10 Best Performers of 2025	No Other Choice	Won	
The Seoul Awards	2018	Best Actor (Film)	The Fortress, Keys to the Heart	Nominated	
The Seoul Awards	2018	Best Actor (Drama)	Mr. Sunshine	Won	
TIFF Tribute Awards	2025	Special Tribute Award	Lee Byung-hun	Honored	
University Film Festival of Korea	2020	Best Actor	The Man Standing Next	Won	

== Other accolades ==
=== State honors ===
Name of country, year given, and name of honor
Country	Year	Honor	Ref.
South Korea (Note: Honors are given at the Korean Popular Culture and Arts Awards, arranged by the Korea Creative Content Agency and hosted by the Ministry of Culture, Sports and Tourism. They are awarded to those who have contributed to the arts and South Korea's pop culture.)	2011	Presidential Commendation	
South Korea	2025	Bogwan Order of Cultural Merit	

=== Listicles ===
Key
‡	Indicates a sole placement listicle

Name of publisher, year listed, name of listicle, and placement
Publisher	Year	List	Placement	Ref.
Cine21	2026	‡ Actor of the Year	Included	
Forbes	2010	Korea Power Celebrity	4th	
Forbes	2014	Korea Power Celebrity	16th	
Forbes	2016	Korea Power Celebrity	40th	
Forbes	2019	Korea Power Celebrity	19th	
Forbes	2025	Korea Power Celebrity	13th	
Gallup Korea	2024	Best Television Couple of the Past 10 Years	5th (Note: With Kim Tae-ri for Mr. Sunshine (2018))	
Korean Film Council	2021	Korean Actors 200 (Note: Introduces 200 actors that best represent the present and future of Korean cinema to the people in the film industry all over the world.)	Included	
News1	2018	Actor of the Year (Note: Year-end survey of 25 industry professionals, including drama PDs and officials from production companies and agencies, conducted by News1.)	1st	
