= Lee Mi-yeon =

South Korean actress (born 1971)

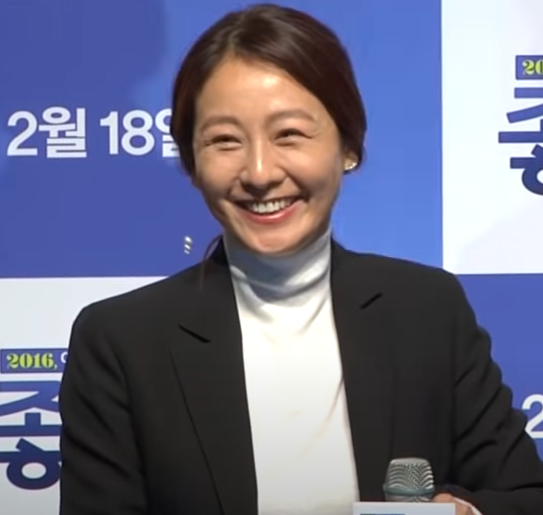
- Lee at Like for Likes press-con in 2016
- Born: September 23, 1971 (age 55); Seoul, South Korea
- Education: Dongguk University - Theater
- Occupation: Actress
- Years active: 1987–present
- Agent: King Kong by Starship
- Spouse: Kim Seung-woo (m. 1995; div. 2000)

Korean name
- Hangul: 이미연
- Hanja: 李美姸
- RR: I Miyeon
- MR: I Miyŏn

Lee Mi-yeon (Korean: 이미연; born September 23, 1971) is a South Korean actress. Lee is best known for her portrayal of the Empress Myeongseong in the television series of that name, as well as the historical drama The Great Merchant (2010).

== Filmography ==
=== Film ===
Year	Title	Role	Notes
1989	Happiness Does Not Come In Grades	Lee Eun-joo	
1990	Well, Let's Look at the Sky Sometimes	Hye-joo	
1991	Autumn Journey	So-yeon	
1991	Do You Like Afternoons After the Rain?	Eun-chae	
1992	Snow Flower	Yoo Da-mi	
1993	I Will Survive	Sug-young	
1995	Go Alone Like Musso's Horn	Young-sun	
1997	No. 3	Hyun-ji	
1997	Motel Cactus	Min Hee-soo	
1998	Whispering Corridors	Hur Eun-young	
1999	The Harmonium in My Memory	Yang Eun-hee	
2000	Love Bakery	Lee Hae-sook	
2000	Pisces	Ae-ryun	
2001	Indian Summer	Lee Shin-young	
2001	The Last Witness	Son Ji-hye	
2002	Fun Movie	Actress at the airport	Cameo
2002	Addicted	Heo Eun-soo	
2005	Typhoon	Choi Myeong-ju	
2007	Love Exposure	Seo Jeong-wan	
2012	A Company Man	Yoo Mi-yeon	
2016	Like for Likes	Jo Kyung-ah	

=== Television series ===
Year	Title	Role	Notes
1988	Joy of Love		
1990	Tree Blooming with Love		
1990	Freezing Point		
1991	West Wind		
1991	A Wall		
1992	Wind in the Forest	Ji Yoon-hee	
1992	Outside the Window, the Sun Shone	Choi Yoo-mi	
1993	The Ways of Love	Yoo Mi-ri	
1994	Bird, Bird, Blue Bird		
1994	Three Men, Three Women	Oh Soon-jung	
1994	What We Want from a Woman		
1996	Why Not Divorce	Seo Hee-jae	
1999	Love Story: Open Ended	Ji-yeon	
2001	Empress Myeongseong	Empress Myeongseong	episodes 1, 10-81
2007	Crazy in Love	Seo Jin-young	
2010	The Great Merchant	Kim Man-deok	
2015	Reply 1988	older Sung Deok-sun	

=== Television show ===
Year	Title	Notes	Ref.
1990	River Music Festival	Host	
1992–1993	Saturday Saturday Is Fun	Host	
2013–2014	Sisters Over Flowers	Cast member	

=== Music video appearances ===
Year	Song title	Artist	Ref.
2000	"To the Next Person"	Jo Sung-mo	
2001	"If I Leave"	Sumi Jo	
2007	"I Love You Even Though I Hate You"	Davichi	

== Theater ==
Year	Title	Role	Ref.
1991	Faust	Gretchen	

== Discography ==
Year	Title	Notes
1990	90 Love Story	
2001	Lee Mi-yeon's Sonata	Compilation album

== Awards and nominations ==
Year	Award	Category	Nominated work	Result	Ref.
1987	Miss Lotte Pageant	1위	—N/a	Won	
1990	26th Baeksang Arts Awards	Best New Actress	Happiness Does Not Come In Grades	Won	
1990	28th Grand Bell Awards	Best New Actress	Happiness Does Not Come In Grades	Nominated	
1990	10th Korean Association of Film Critics Awards	Best New Actress	Happiness Does Not Come In Grades	Won	
1990	KBS Drama Awards	Best New Actress	Tree Blooming with Love	Won	
1993	31st Grand Bell Awards	Best Supporting Actress	Snow Flower	Won	
1999	36th Grand Bell Awards	Best Supporting Actress	Whispering Corridors	Won	
1999	20th Blue Dragon Film Awards	Best Supporting Actress	The Harmonium in My Memory	Won	
2000	37th Grand Bell Awards	Best Supporting Actress	The Harmonium in My Memory	Nominated	
2000	21st Blue Dragon Film Awards	Best Leading Actress	Pisces	Won	
2000	3rd Director's Cut Awards	Best Actress	Pisces	Won	
2000	Cine21 Film Awards	Best Actress	Pisces	Won	
2001	38th Grand Bell Awards	Best Actress	Pisces	Nominated	
2001	22nd Blue Dragon Film Awards	Best Leading Actress	Indian Summer	Nominated	
2001	22nd Blue Dragon Film Awards	Popular Star Award	Indian Summer	Won	
2001	KBS Drama Awards	Top Excellence Award, Actress	Empress Myeongseong	Won	
2002	38th Baeksang Arts Awards	Best Actress – Television	Empress Myeongseong	Nominated	
2002	Savings Day	Presidential Commendation	—N/a	Won	
2002	23rd Blue Dragon Film Awards	Best Leading Actress	Addicted	Nominated	
2003	40th Grand Bell Awards	Best Actress	Addicted	Won	
2004	41st Grand Bell Awards	Best Dressed	—N/a	Won	
2006	20th Golden Cinematography Awards	Special Jury Prize	Typhoon	Won	
2007	3rd Andre Kim Best Star Awards	Female Star Award	—N/a	Won	
2007	SBS Drama Awards	Excellence Award, Actress in a Serial Drama	Crazy in Love	Nominated	
2008	16th Chunsa Film Art Awards	Best Actress	Love Exposure	Won	
2010	3rd Korea Drama Awards	Best Actress	The Great Merchant	Nominated	
2010	KBS Drama Awards	Excellence Award, Actress in a Serial Drama	The Great Merchant	Nominated	
