= Kill the Love =

- Film poster
- Directed by: Im Jong-jae
- Written by: Cho Myung-joo; Im Jong-jae
- Produced by: Lee Choon-yun; Yoo In-taek
- Starring: Lee Byung-hun; Jeong Seon-kyeong; Yu Oh-seong
- Cinematography: Seo Jeong-min
- Edited by: Kim Hyeon
- Music by: Lee Byung-woo
- Distributed by: Cine 2000
- Release date: October 19, 1996 (South Korea)
- Running time: 119 minutes
- Country: South Korea
- Language: Korean

Kill the Love (Korean: 그들만의 세상; RR: Geudeulmanui sesang) is a 1996 South Korean crime drama film.

== Plot ==
When Love, the protagonist, joins the Korean Underworld in United States, he falls in love with a nightclub dancer. As a result, his friend wants to kill him.

== Cast ==
- Lee Byung-hun as Love
- Jeong Seon-kyeong as Choonhyang
- Yu Oh-seong as Paikjoon
- Park Geun-hyung
- Song Ok-sook
- Kwon Yong-woon
- Park Dong-chun
- Jeong Seong-gi
- Park Soo-yun
