= Seongnam Arts Center =

Concert hall in Seongnam, South Korea

Coordinates: 37.402890°N 127.131237°E

The Seongnam Arts Center (성남아트센터) is the largest venue for cultural events in the city of Seongnam. It is in Yatap-dong in Bundang, within a few minutes' walk of Imae Station. And it is situated near the Taewon High school. So students of this school often visit Seongnam Arts Center. The Seongnam Arts Center was first opened on 14 October 2005 by the Seongnam Cultural Foundation.

== Performing venues ==
The Seongnam Arts Center is able to put on any kind of performance from ballet, to opera, to jazz, in its three main performance areas:

- The Opera House seats 1,808 and is capable of hosting operas, musicals, plays, ballets, and concerts. It is intended as a link between local and international culture.
- The Concert Hall was acoustically designed with classical music performances in mind. This two-story facility seats 1,102.
- The Ensemble Theatre, seats 378, in addition to the regular stage, has a T-stage wrapping itself around the seats, allowing the performance to come closer to the audience.

== Galleries ==
The Seongnam Arts Center complex includes the Seongnam Cube Art Museum (성남큐브미술관), operated by the Seongnam Cultural Foundation. Its exhibition facilities include a special exhibition hall, a permanent exhibition hall, and the Bandal Gallery.

== Other facilities ==
The arts center provides visitor amenities across its performance venues. The Opera House includes a children's playroom and a nursing room on the first floor, as well as Gallery 808 and the Piglet restaurant on the basement level. The Concert Hall has Café Concert on its first floor. Parking facilities are available throughout the arts center complex.

Known as the academy, a variety of courses are available for the public in the areas of both fine and the performing arts. Facilities such as music, ballet and art rooms are in the Concert Hall and the Ensemble Theater.

== Events ==
- 2009: musical, Namhansanseong is based on the novel of the same name by Kim Hoon, which is based on the incident of Byeongjahoran, in which during the Second Manchu invasion of Korea in 1636, when King Injo of Joseon Dynasty took refuge in the Namhan Mountain Fortress in Gyeonggi-do, in an ill-fated attempt to defy the rule of the Manchu Qing Empire Hong Taiji, following the first Manchu invasion of Korea in 1627. But the musical focuses on the lives of common people and their spirit of survival during harsh situations. It stars Yesung of boy band Super Junior as villain "Jung Myung-soo", a servant-turned-interpreter. It was shown from 9 October to 4 November at the Opera House.

== See also ==
- List of concert halls
