= Kim Hoon =

South Korean writer (born 1948)

- 김훈
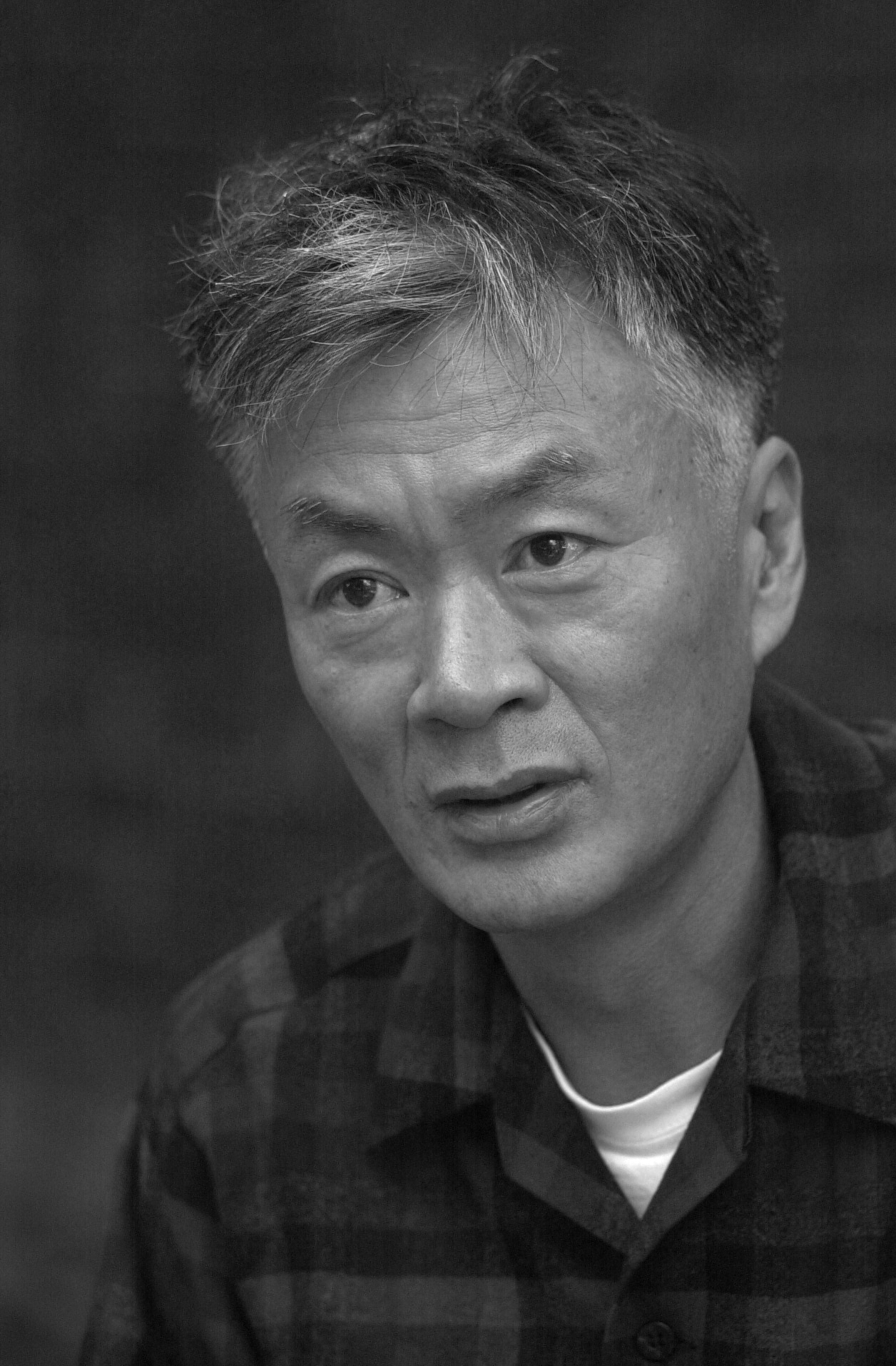
- Born: May 5, 1948 (age 78); Seoul, South Korea
- Occupations: writer, journalist, critic, essayist
- Writing career
- Period: 1994 -
- Genres: novels, short-stories
- Notable work: Song of the Sword
- Notable awards: Yi Sang Literary Award

Korean name
- Hangul: 김훈
- Hanja: 金薰
- RR: Gim Hun
- MR: Kim Hun

Kim Hoon (Korean: 김훈; born May 5, 1948) is a South Korean novelist, journalist and critic.His second novel, Song of the Sword, published in 2001, won him the prestigious Dong-in LIterature prize and made him one of the most recognized names in Korean literature.In 2024, Kim's 2022 best selling novel Harbin was adapted to the big screen in the successful film of the same name, Harbin, starring Hyun Bin.

== Early Life and Education ==
Kim was born on May 5, 1948, in Seoul, Korea. After graduating from Whimoon High School, Kim Hoon was admitted to Korea University in 1966. He joined the South Korean newspaper Hankook Ilbo as a journalist in 1973.

== Career ==
After being a journalist for 20 years, he made his debut as a novelist at the age of forty-seven with the publication of Memories of Earthenware with Comb Teeth Pattern. His second novel. Song of the Sword (칼의 노래), which was awarded the prestigious Dong-in Literature Prize, was a literary sensation and made him one of the most recognized names in Korean literature.

Two years later in 2003, Kim's reputation as a writer of exceptional talent was confirmed when his first published short-story "Cremation" was chosen as the winner of Lee Sang Literature Prize. Kim worked as a journalist for 20 years before becoming a writer and is well known for refusing to use anything but a pencil when he writes.He is also an avid cyclist who does not have a driver's license and has written a series of essays on his bicycle travels across the south of the Korean peninsula.

He married Lee Yeon-hwa in 1974. They have a daughter (Kim Ji-yeon, who later founded Siren Pictures - the production company behind The Fortress, itself based on a novel by Kim Hoon) and a son (Kim Ji-kang).

== Works ==
Though he became a fiction writer at a relatively late age, Kim writes with flair and the dexterity of a seasoned novelist. Grounded in his journalistic background, his writing style is polished and unsentimental, and Kim crafts his sentences masterfully to infuse lyrical rhythm to his work without sacrificing clarity and poise.

His job as a journalist, which required him to rush to the scenes of disaster, has also given him an insight into the psyches of people in stressful situations. Kim's ability to identify pertinent details and moments of significance in the chaos of life-or-death situations, which he perfected in his line of work as a reporter, can be seen in his first novel, "Memories of Earthenware with Comb Teeth Pattern". Written in the form of a detective story involving the mysterious death of a firefighter, the novel presents a palpably real portrait of the battle with raging fire, and investigates the intensity of human emotions in dire circumstances with acuity, subtlety and insight.

In his second novel, "Song of the Sword", Kim gives us a powerful picture of General Yi Sun-sin, not as a mere war-hero, but as an ordinary man facing extraordinary circumstances and struggling with the complexity of his own interior landscape. His next novel Song of Strings focuses on the life of the renowned musician Ureug who lived more than fifteen hundred years ago during the Shilla period.

Namhansanseong (남한산성) is his latest work and has sold almost 1 million copies in South Korea. It is based on the incident known as Byeongjahoran, during the Second Manchu invasion of Korea in 1636, when King Injo of Joseon Dynasty took refuge in the Namhan Mountain Fortress in Gyeonggi Province, in an ill-fated attempt to defy the rule of the Manchu Qing Empire Hong Taiji, following the First Manchu invasion of Korea in 1627. In 2017, it was adapted into a film entitled The Fortress, under the production company Siren Pictures of his own daughter Kim Ji-yeon.

In 2009 a musical also titled, Namhansanseong was based on the novel, but focuses on the lives of common people and their spirit of survival during harsh situations. It stars Yesung of boy band Super Junior as villain "Jung Myung-soo", a servant-turned-interpreter. It was shown from 14 to 31 October at Seongnam Arts Center Opera House.

In 2011 Kim's work "Schwertgesang" (translated by Heidi Kang and Ahn So-hyun) won the Daesan Award for Translated Literature.

In 2022, Kim published his book Harbin which centered around the independence activist An Jung-geun. Kim emphasized that "unlike many literary works that deal with An’s patriotism and heroism, his book focuses on the activist’s youthful energy. 'As if he’s alive right next to you, I wanted to describe his youth, his soul and his vitality.'" The book became a best seller and was later adapted to the big screen in the film Harbin, starring Hyun Bin.

=== Translated works ===
Language; German
Title: Schwertgesang
Original title: 칼의 노래
Genre: Modern/ Fiction
Publisher: Edition Delta
Translated by: Heidi Kang

Language: French
Title: Le Chant Du Sabre
Original title: 칼의 노래
Genre: Modern/ Fiction
Publisher: Gallimard
Translated by : Yang Young-Nan, François Théron

Language: English
Title: From Powder to Powder
Genre: Modern/ Fiction
In: Land of Exile

== Awards ==
- Dong-in Prize 2001, for his novel, Song of the Sword
- Saturation coverage prize from 18th Seoul Journalist Club Award, 2002
- 2004 Yi Sang Literary Award, 〈화장〉 "Cremation" (Called "From Powder to Powder" in translation)
- The 4th Hwang Sunwon Prize, 2005, for The menopause of my older sister
- The 15th Daesan Literary Award, 2007
- Daesan Award for Translated literature, 2011 for "Schwertgesang"

== See also ==
- Korean literature
