= Qing invasion of Joseon =

1636 invasion of Korea by Manchu China

- Part of Korean–Jurchen conflicts, Ming-Qing transition
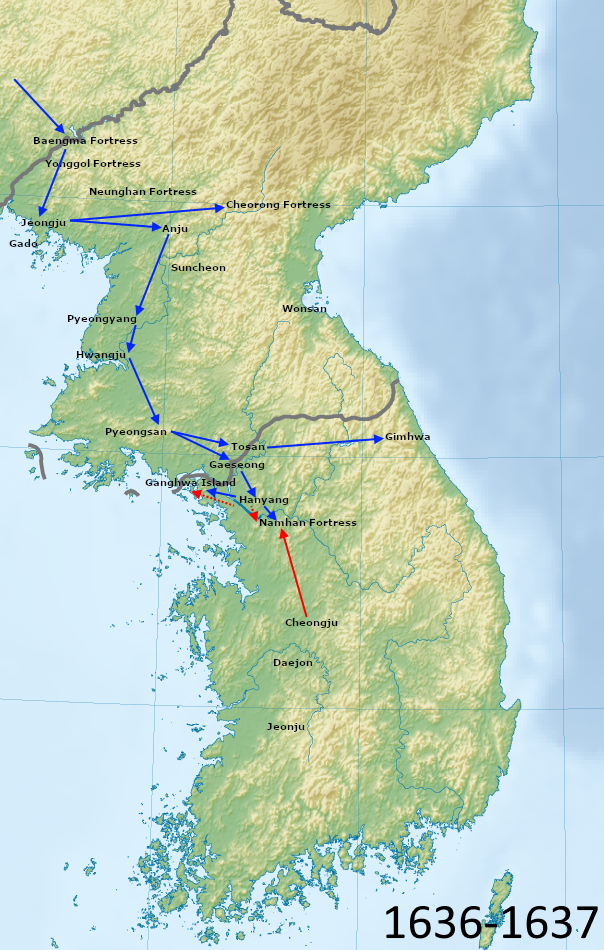
Date	9 December 1636 – 30 January 1637
Location	Northern Korean Peninsula
Result	Qing victory Joseon switches tributary allegiance from the Ming to the Qing

Belligerents
Qing dynasty	Joseon Kingdom; Ming dynasty

Commanders and leaders
Hong Taiji; Dorgon; Ajige; Dodo; Hooge; Oboi; Kong Youde; Geng Zhongming; Shang Kexi	King Injo; Im Gyeong-eop; Hong Myeong-gu; Yu Lim

Strength
100,000	80,000–90,000

Casualties and losses
Unknown	Unknown

- Qing invasion of Joseon
- Hangul: 병자호란
- Hanja: 丙子胡亂
- RR: Byeongjahoran
- MR: Pyŏngjahoran

The Qing invasion of Joseon (Korean: 병자호란; Hanja: 丙子胡亂) occurred in the winter of 1636 when the newly established Manchu-led Qing Empire invaded the Joseon Kingdom of what is now Korea, establishing the former's status as the hegemon in the Imperial Chinese tributary system and formally severing Joseon's relationship with the Han-led Ming dynasty. The invasion was preceded by the Later Jin invasion of Joseon in 1627.

The invasion resulted in a Qing victory. Joseon was forced to establish a tributary relationship with the Qing, as well as to cut ties with the declining Ming. The crown prince of Joseon and his younger brother were taken as hostages, but they came back to Joseon after a few years. One of the two later became King Hyojong of Joseon. He is best known for his plan for an expedition to the Qing.

== Names ==
In Korean, the Qing invasion (1636–1637) is called 'Byeongja Horan' (병자호란), where 1636 is a 'Byeongja' year in the sexagenary cycle and 'Horan' means a disturbance caused by northern or western foreigners, from 胡 (ho; northern or western, often nomadic barbarians) + 亂 (ran; chaos, disorder, disturbance, turmoil, unrest, uprising, revolt, rebellion).

== Background ==
The Kingdom of Joseon continued to show ambivalence toward the Qing Empire after the Jin invasion in 1627. The Later Jin accused Joseon of harboring fugitives and supplying the Ming army with grain. In addition, Joseon did not recognize Hong Taiji's newly declared dynasty. The Manchu delegates Inggūldai and Mafuta received a cold reception in Hanseong, and King Injo of Joseon refused to meet them or even send a letter, which shocked the delegates. A warlike message to Pyongan Province was also carelessly allowed to be seized by Inggūldai.

The beile (Qing princes) were furious with Joseon's response to Qing overtures and proposed an immediate invasion, but Hong Taiji chose to conduct a raid against Ming first. At one point the Qing forces under Ajige got as close to Beijing as the Marco Polo Bridge. Although they were ultimately repelled, the raid made it clear that Ming defenses were no longer fully capable of securing their borders. After this successful operation, Hong Taiji turned towards Joseon and launched an attack in December 1636.

Prior to the invasion, Hong Taiji sent Abatai, Jirgalang, and Ajige to secure the coastal approaches to Joseon Korea, so that Ming could not send reinforcements. The defector Ming mutineer Kong Youde, ennobled as the Qing dynasty's Prince Gongshun, joined the attacks at Ganghwa Island and Ka Island. The defectors Geng Zhongming and Shang Kexi also played prominent roles in the Korean invasion.

== War ==
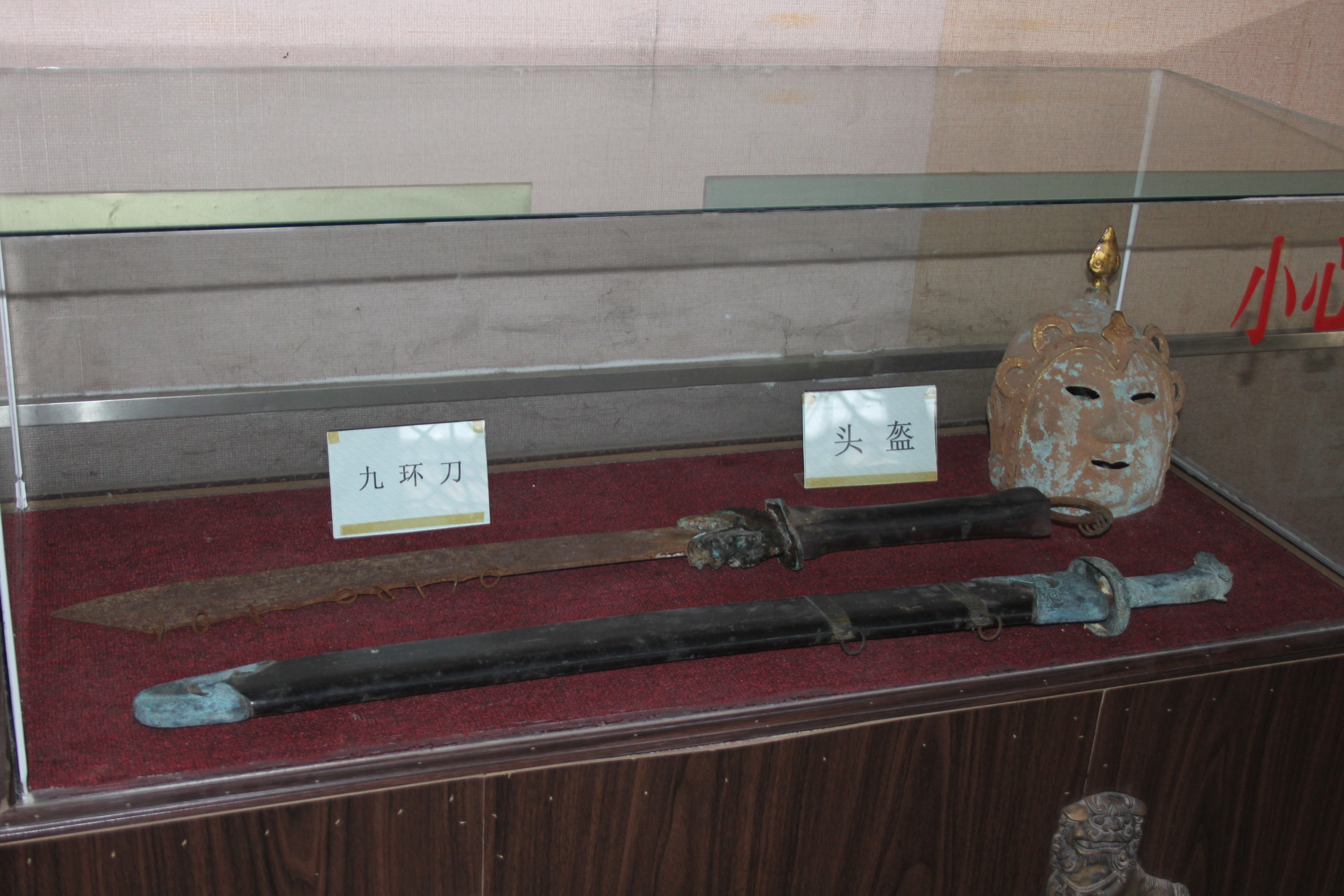
Qing swords and face helmet

On 9 December 1636, Hong Taiji led Manchu, Mongol, and Han Chinese Banners in a three pronged attack on Joseon. Chinese support was particularly evident in the army's artillery and naval contingents.

Im Gyeong-eop with 3,000 men at the Baengma fortress in Uiju, successfully held off attacks by the 30,000 strong western division led by Dodo. Dodo decided not to take the fortress and passed it instead. Similarly, elsewhere Manchu forces of the main division under Hong Taiji bypassed northern Joseon fortresses. Dorgon and Hooge led a vanguard Mongol force straight to Hanseong to prevent King Injo from evacuating to Ganghwa Island, just as in the previous war. On 14 December, Hanseong's garrisons were defeated, and the city was taken. Fifteen thousand troops were mobilized from the south to relieve the city, but they were defeated by Dorgon's army.

King Injo, along with 13,800 soldiers, took refuge at the Namhansanseong (the Namhan Mountain Fortress), which did not have enough provisions stockpiled for such a large number of people. Hong Taiji's main division, 70,000 strong, laid siege to the fortress. Provincial forces from around the country began moving in to relieve King Injo and his retinue of defenders. Joseon forces under Hong Myeong-gu and Yu Lim, 5,000 strong, engaged 6,000 Manchus on 28 January. The Manchu cavalry attempted frontal assaults several times but was turned back by heavy musket fire. Eventually they circumnavigated a mountain and ambushed Hong's troops from the rear, defeating them. Protected by the mountainous terrain, Yu's forces fared better and successfully decimated the Manchu forces after defeating their attacks several times throughout the day. The Joseon troops within the fortress, which consisted of both capital and prefectural armies, also successfully defended the fortress against Manchu assaults, forcing their actions to be relegated to small-scale clashes for a few weeks.

Despite working on tight rations, by January 1637 the Joseon defenders were able to effectively counter Manchu siegeworks with sorties and even managed to blow up the powder magazine of an artillery battery that was assailing the East Gate of the fortress, killing its commander and many soldiers. Some walls crumbled under repeated bombardment, but were repaired overnight. Despite their successes, Dorgon occupied Ganghwa Island on 27 January, and captured the second son and consorts of King Injo. King Injo surrendered the day after.

The surrendering delegation was received at the Han River, where King Injo turned over his Ming seals of investiture and three pro-war officers to the Qing, as well as agreeing to the following terms of peace, which required Joseon to:

1. stop using the Ming-era name as well as abandon using the seal, imperial patent, and jade books from the Ming empire;
2. send two royal princes as hostages and accept the Qing calendar;
3. receive the Qing envoys and perform rituals in the same way Joseon had done towards the Ming empire as the subject of the Son of Heaven;
4. send Joseon troops and provide supplies in support of the Qing empire's foreign expeditions;
5. not construct fortresses for defense;
6. not accept persons who flee from the Qing empire; and
7. send tributes every year.

Hong Taiji set up a platform in Samjeondo in the upper reach of the Han River. Injo of Joseon knelt three times and bowed nine times, as was customary with the other subjects of the Qing court. Then he was called to eat with the others, sitting the closest to the left of Hong Taiji, higher than even the Hošo-i Cin Wang. A monument in honor of the so-called excellent virtues of the Manchu Emperor was erected at Samjeondo, where the ceremony of submission had been conducted. In accordance with the terms of surrender, Joseon sent troops to attack Ka Island at the mouth of the Yalu River.

Ming officer Shen Shikui was well ensconced in Ka Island's fortifications and hammered his attackers with heavy cannon for over a month. In the end, Ming and Joseon defectors including Kong Youde landed 70 boats on the eastern side of the island and drew out his garrison in that direction. On the next morning, however, he found that the Qing—"who seem to have flown"—had landed to his rear in the northwest corner of the island in the middle of the night. Shen refused to surrender, but was overrun and beheaded by Ajige. Official reports put the casualties as at least 10,000, with few survivors. The Ming general Yang Sichang then withdrew the remaining Ming forces in Korea to Denglai in northern Shandong.

== Aftermath ==
Many Korean women were kidnapped and raped at the hands of the Qing forces, and as a result were not welcomed by their families even if they were released by the Qing after being ransomed. Divorce demands rose, causing social unrest, but the government rejected the divorce requests and said the repatriated women should not be regarded as having been disgraced. In 1648 Joseon was forced to provide several royal princesses as concubines to the Qing regent Prince Dorgon. In 1650 Dorgon married the Joseon Princess Uisun, the daughter of Prince Geumnim, who had to be adopted by King Hyojong beforehand. Dorgon married another Joseon princess at Lianshan.

Koreans continued to harbor a defiant attitude towards the Qing dynasty in private, while they officially yielded obedience, and sentiments of Manchu "barbarity" continued to pervade Korean discourse. Joseon scholars secretly used Ming-era names even after that dynasty's collapse, and some people believed that Joseon should have been the legitimate successor of the Ming dynasty and Chinese civilization instead of the "barbaric" Manchu's Qing. Despite the peace treaty forbidding construction of fortresses, fortresses were erected around Hanseong and in the northern region. The future Hyojong of Joseon lived as a hostage for seven years in Mukden (Shenyang). He planned an invasion of Qing called Bukbeol (Korean: 북벌; Hanja: 北伐; lit. 'northern expedition') during his ten years on the Joseon throne, though the plan died with his death on the eve of the expedition.

From 1639 until 1894, the Joseon court trained a corps of professional Korean-Manchu translators. They replaced earlier interpreters of Jurchen, who had been trained using textbooks in the Jurchen script. Joseon's first textbooks of Manchu were drawn up by Shin Gye-am, who had previously been an interpreter of Jurchen, and he transliterated old Jurchen textbooks into the Manchu script. Shin's adapted textbooks, completed in 1639, were used for the yeokgwa (special examinations for foreign languages) until 1684. The Manchu examination replaced the Jurchen examination, and the examination's official title was not changed from "Jurchen" to "Manchu" until 1667.

For much of Joseon's historical discourse following the invasion, the Qing invasion was seen as a more important event than the Japanese invasions of Korea from 1592 to 1598, which, while devastating, had not ended in complete defeat for Joseon. The defeat at the hands of the "barbarian" Manchus, the humiliation of the Joseon kings and Yi family, as well as the destruction of the Ming dynasty, had a deeper psychological impact on contemporary Korean society than the Japanese invasions. The Japanese invasions had not created a fundamental change in the Ming world order of which Joseon had been part. It was only after the rise of Japan during the 19th century and the following invasion and annexation of Korea that the 16th-century Japanese invasions by Toyotomi Hideyoshi became more significant.

== Popular culture ==
- The novel Namhansanseong by South Korean novelist Kim Hoon is based on the second invasion. It was later adapted to a movie in 2017 as The Fortress.
- The 2009 musical, Namhansanseong, is based on the novel of the same name, but focuses on the lives of common people and their spirit of survival during harsh situations. It stars Yesung of boy band Super Junior as villain "Jung Myung-su", a servant-turned-interpreter. It was shown from 9 October to 14 November at Seongnam Arts Center Opera House.
- The 2011 South Korean movie War of the Arrows is set during the Qing invasion.
- The 2015 South Korean drama Splendid Politics.
- The 2017 South Korean movie The Fortress.
- The 2023 South Korean TV series My Dearest tells the story of events of this invasion using two pairs of fictional lovers, and placing them as protagonists in key events of the invasion and its aftermath.
- The 2024 South Korean TV series Captivating the King tells the story in the aftermath of this invasion using fictional Palace characters, and placing them as protagonists in the capital.

== See also ==
- Later Jin invasion of Joseon
- History of Korea
- Yeongeunmun
- Independence Gate
- Samjeondo Monument
- Korean–Jurchen border conflicts
