= Kim Ji-yong (cinematographer) =

South Korean cinematographer

- Notable work: A Bittersweet Life; Squid Game (season 2)

Kim Ji-yong (Korean: 김지용) is a South Korean cinematographer and director. Ji-yong is the first Korean cinematographer to receive the EnergaCAMERIMAGE Golden Frog award.

== Filmography ==
Year	Film	Language	Notes
2005	A Bittersweet Life	Korean	
2006	Forbidden Quest	Korean	
2007	Hansel and Gretel	Korean	
2009	Marine Boy	Korean	
2010	The Influence	Korean	
2019	Ashfall	Korean	
2022	Decision to Leave	Korean	
2023	Cobweb	Korean	
2024	The Sympathizer	English	
2024–2025	Squid Game	Korean	Season 2
2025	Holy Night: Demon Hunters	Korean	
2026	Possible Love	Korean	

== Awards ==
Year	Nominated work	Association	Category	Result	Ref.
2005	A Bittersweet Life	Grand Bell Awards	Best Cinematography	Nominated	
2005	A Bittersweet Life	Blue Dragon Film Awards	Best Cinematography	Won	
2006	A Bittersweet Life	Fantasia International Film Festival	Best Photography	Won	
2018	The Fortress	Camerimage	Golden Frog	Won	
2018	The Fortress	Korean Association of Film Critics Awards	Best Cinematography	Won	
2018	The Fortress	Blue Dragon Film Awards	Best Cinematography-Lighting	Nominated	
2018	The Fortress	Asian Film Awards	Best Cinematography	Won	
2018	The Fortress	Chunsa Film Art Awards	Technical Award	Won	
2018	The Fortress	Buil Film Awards	Best Cinematography	Nominated	
2018	The Fortress	Grand Bell Awards	Best Cinematography	Won	
2026	Possible Love	Blue Dragon Film Awards	Best Cinematography and Lighting	Pending	
