= Runaway (1995 film) =

- Film poster
- Hangul: 런어웨이
- RR: Reoneowei
- MR: Rŏnŏwei
- Directed by: Kim Sung-su
- Written by: Kim Sung-su
- Produced by: Park Sang-in; Kim Hyeon-taek
- Starring: Lee Byung-hun; Kim Eun-jeong
- Edited by: Kim Hyeon
- Music by: Jo Seong-woo
- Distributed by: Ik Young Films Co., Ltd
- Release date: December 30, 1995 (South Korea)
- Running time: 106 minutes
- Country: South Korea
- Language: Korean

Runaway (Korean: 런어웨이) is a 1995 South Korean action thriller film.

== Plot ==
Lee Dong-ho, a computer game producer, and Choi Miran, a freelance illustrator, meet by chance and spend a short but passionate night together. As they are about to go back to their lives, they witness a gang murder. The couple then become the perpetrators' next targets. A police officer working on the murder turns out to be a kidnapper. Hired killers break into their homes and kill their loved ones in front of their eyes. Nobody is of much help to them. At home, in the police station, in the hospital, at work, wherever they go, criminals seem to follow them. Finally, they must face the real criminals.

== Cast ==
- Lee Byung-hun ... Lee Dong-ho
- Kim Eun-jeong ... Choi Miran
- Lee Geung-young
- Jang Se-jin ... Wolf
- Jang Dong-jik
- Lee Cheol-ung
- Kim Ki-hyeon
- Lee Seok-jun
- Kim Dong-geon
- Lee Eun-Young
