= The Match (2025 film) =

2025 film by Kim Hyung-joo

- Theatrical release poster
- Hangul: 승부
- Hanja: 勝負
- Lit.: The Game
- RR: Seungbu
- MR: Sŭngbu
- Directed by: Kim Hyung-joo
- Written by: Kim Hyung-joo; Yoon Jong-bin
- Produced by: Guk Su-ran; Yoon Jong-bin
- Starring: Lee Byung-hun; Yoo Ah-in; Ko Chang-seok; Hyun Bong-sik; Moon Jeong-hee; Kim Kang-hoon
- Cinematography: You Eok
- Edited by: Kim Sang-bum
- Music by: Jo Yeong-wook
- Production companies: MoonLight Film Company; BH Entertainment
- Distributed by: BY4M Studio; Netflix
- Release date: March 26, 2025
- Running time: 115 minutes
- Country: South Korea
- Language: Korean
- Box office: US$14.6 million

The Match (Korean: 승부) is a 2025 South Korean biographical sports drama film directed and written by Kim Hyung-joo, based on two real-life notable Go players Cho Hun-hyun and Lee Chang-ho. It stars Lee Byung-hun, Yoo Ah-in, Ko Chang-seok, Hyun Bong-sik, Moon Jeong-hee, and Kim Kang-hoon. The film was released theatrically on March 26, 2025.

== Synopsis ==
Set in the 1980s-1990s and based on two real-life notable Go players, the film tells the story of Cho Hun-hyun, a Go champion who discovers a gifted but untrained young boy Lee Chang-ho in an amateur contest. He takes him under his wing to turn into a professional player. Conflicts arise when the protégé later turns against his teachings.

== Cast ==
- Lee Byung-hun as Cho Hun-hyun
- Yoo Ah-in as Lee Chang-ho
  - Kim Kang-hoon as young Lee Chang-ho
- Ko Chang-seok as Cheon Seung-pil
- Hyun Bong-sik as Lee Yong-gak
- Moon Jeong-hee as Jung Mi-hwa, Cho Hun-yun's wife
- Jo Woo-jin as Nam Ki-cheol
- Jeon Moo-song as Lee Hwa-chun
- Jeong Suk-yong as Chang-ho's father

== Production ==
=== Casting ===
In October 2020, Lee Byung-hun and Yoo Ah-in joined the cast of the film, followed by Moon Jeong-hee and child actor Kim Kang-hoon.

=== Filming ===
Principal photography began on December 17, 2020. Filming took place in Yeongnam, Gyeongsang Province and Gangwon Province, and wrapped up in July, 2021.

== Release ==
The Match was scheduled to be released on Netflix in 2023. Prior to the release, the film launched international sales and was screened at the Busan International Film Festival's Asian Contents & Film Market in October 2021. However, it was delayed following Yoo Ah-in's drug use charges.

In February 2025, it was reported that The Match would to be released in theaters in the first half of 2025 after its Netflix release was delayed. The film will finally be released on May 7, 2025 on the platform in selected regions.

== Reception ==
=== Box office ===
The film was released on March 26, 2025, on 1,638 screens. It opened at first place at the South Korean box office with 91,471 admissions.

The film has grossed US$14,382,747 from 2,146,284 admissions.

=== Accolades ===
Award	Year	Category	Recipient(s)	Result	Ref.
Baeksang Arts Awards	2025	Best Actor	Lee Byung-hun	Nominated	
Baeksang Arts Awards	2025	Best Screenplay	Kim Hyung-joo, Yoon Jong-bin	Nominated	
Blue Dragon Film Awards	2025	Best Screenplay	Kim Hyung-joo, Yoon Jong-bin	Won	
Blue Dragon Film Awards	2025	Best Editing	Kim Sang-bum	Nominated	
Blue Dragon Film Awards	2025	Best Art Direction	Jung Eun-young	Nominated	
Buil Film Awards	2025	Best Director	Kim Hyung-joo	Nominated	
Buil Film Awards	2025	Best Actor	Lee Byung-hun	Won	
Buil Film Awards	2025	Best Art/Technical Award	Jung Eun-young	Nominated	
Director's Cut Awards	2025	Best Director (Film)	Kim Hyung-joo	Nominated	
Director's Cut Awards	2025	Best Screenplay (Film)	Kim Hyung-joo, Yoon Jong-bin	Nominated	
Director's Cut Awards	2025	Best Actor (Film)	Yoo Ah-in	Nominated	
Director's Cut Awards	2025	Best Actor (Film)	Lee Byung-hun	Won	
Golden Cinematography Awards	2025	Best Picture	The Match	Won	
Golden Cinematography Awards	2025	Best Supporting Actor	Ko Chang-seok	Won	
Korean Film Producers Association Awards	2025	Best Actor	Lee Byung-hun	Won	
Korean Film Producers Association Awards	2025	Best Art Direction	Jung Eun-young	Won	
