= A Bittersweet Life =

- Theatrical release poster
- Hangul: 달콤한 인생
- Hanja: 달콤한 人生
- RR: Dalkomhan insaeng
- MR: Talk'omhan insaeng
- Directed by: Kim Jee-woon
- Written by: Kim Jee-woon
- Produced by: Park Dong-ho; Eugene Lee
- Starring: Lee Byung-hun; Kim Yeong-cheol; Shin Min-a; Kim Roi-ha
- Cinematography: Kim Ji-yong
- Edited by: Choi Jae-keun
- Music by: Jang Young-gyu; Dalpalan
- Distributed by: CJ Entertainment
- Release date: April 1, 2005
- Running time: 119 minutes
- Country: South Korea
- Languages: Filipino; Korean; Russian
- Box office: US$10.1 million

A Bittersweet Life (Korean: 달콤한 인생; RR: Dalkomhan insaeng; lit. 'The Sweet Life') is a 2005 South Korean action film written and directed by Kim Jee-woon. It stars Lee Byung-hun as Sun-woo, a hitman who becomes targeted by his boss after he spares the latter's cheating mistress.

The film was released theatrically in South Korea on 1 April 2005. It opened on 265 screens throughout the country, and registered a total of 1,112,950 admissions by the end of its run. It was also screened out of competition at the 2005 Cannes Film Festival. A 30 seconds longer director's cut was later released, featuring slight cutting and re-arrangement of scenes, swapping of music placement and some additional scenes that do not appear in the theatrical cut. The film received an unofficial Indian remake titled Awarapan in 2007.

== Plot ==
Kim Sun-woo (Lee Byung-hun) is a high-ranking enforcer and loyal subordinate of crime boss Kang (Kim Yeong-cheol). The two share concerns over business tensions with Baek Dae-sik (Hwang Jung-min), a son from a rival family. Recently, Sun-woo had beaten up Baek's men for overstaying their welcome at their nightclub. Kang, preparing to leave on a business trip, assigns Sun-woo to shadow his young mistress Hee-soo (Shin Min-a), whom he fears is having an "affair" with another man.

As Sun-woo performs his duty — following Hee-soo, and escorting her to a music recital — he becomes quietly enthralled by the girl's beauty as glimpses into his lonely, empty personal life become prevalent. When he does come to discover Hee-soo and her lover at her home, he beats up the man and prepares to inform Kang. However, he changes his mind and spares the two on the condition that they no longer see each other again, earning him Hee-soo's enmity.

Later, a man asks Sun-woo to apologize for beating up Baek's men, but he refuses. Agitated, he gets drunk in his apartment, and is kidnapped by Baek's henchmen. They prepare to kill him, but Kang saves him with a phone call. Kang, who has learned of his attempted cover-up of Hee-soo's affair, questions his motive, but he doesn't answer. Kang orders his men to torture Sun-woo, but gives him a chance to fix his mistake. Instead, Sun-woo escapes and vows revenge.

Sun-woo delivers Hee-soo a farewell gift, then attempts to buy a handgun. The deal goes bad and he ends up killing the arms dealers. This incurs a vendetta with the brother of one of the dealers, who goes to the nightclub where he works. Sun-woo lures Baek to an ice rink and kills him, getting injured in the process.

Undeterred, he arrives at the night club and kills his way in. Confronting Kang, Sun-woo vents over how badly he has been treated despite his years of loyalty. Receiving no justification, Sun-woo kills Kang. Baek's henchmen, who have been trailing Sun-woo, shoot at him and Kang's henchmen. Sun-woo emerges as the only survivor of the battle, just as the arms dealer's brother appears. Heavily wounded bleeding profusely, Sun-woo recalls watching Hee-soo's music recital. That was the only time he was seen smiling. The arms dealer's brother then executes him.

(We also see Hee-soo at home, opening a gift-wrapped package, sent to her, containing a decorative lamp, she wanted to buy earlier in the film, but didn't, because it was too expensive for her.)

The film ends with a continuation of an earlier scene, where Sun-woo looks out of a window at the city below him. After making sure he's alone, he begins to shadowbox his reflection in the glass, looking very happy.

== Cast ==
- Lee Byung-hun as Kim Sun-woo
- Kim Yeong-cheol as Mr. Kang
- Shin Min-a as Moon Hee-soo
- Kim Roi-ha as Mun Suk
- Lee Ki-young as Oh Mu-sung
- Oh Dal-su as Myung-goo
- Kim Hae-gon as Tae-woong
- Kim Han as Se-yoon
- Jin Goo as Min-gi
- Jeon Gook-hwan as President Baek
- Kim Sung-oh as Oh Mu-sung's subordinate
- Jung Yu-mi as Mi-ae

=== Special appearance ===
- Hwang Jung-min as Baek Dae-sik
- Eric Mun as Tae-goo

== Soundtrack ==
A Bittersweet Life Original Soundtrack

Soundtrack album by various artists
- Released: April 7, 2005
- Genre: Soundtrack
- Label: Pony Canyon (Korea)

The A Bittersweet Life original soundtrack was released on April 7, 2005.

A Bittersweet Life OST track listing
No.	Title	Artist	Length
1.	"Dialogue #1"		0:27
2.	"My Sad Night"		4:00
3.	"Irreversible Time"		2:14
4.	"Dialogue #2"		0:04
5.	"Romance"	Yuhki Kuramoto	5:00
6.	"Red Lounge"	Dalparan	4:26
7.	"Long Journey"		2:33
8.	"Red Ice Rink"	Dalparan	3:05
9.	"A Bittersweet Life II"	Dalparan	3:09
10.	"A Bittersweet Life"	Dalparan	2:33
11.	"Escape"	Dalparan	6:02
12.	"Fairness"		2:58
13.	"Dark Room"	Dalparan	3:09
14.	"Follow"	Dalparan	2:25
15.	"Etude in E Minor"		1:55
16.	"Dialogue #3"		0:20
17.	"Sky Lounge"		4:18
18.	"Irreversible Time (Quartet)"		2:09
19.	"A Bittersweet Life III"	Yang Pa	5:39
20.	"A Honeyed Question"	Hwang Jung-min	4:27

== Box office and critical reception ==
The film was screened out of competition at the 2005 Cannes Film Festival. The film at the time had the highest price when its distribution rights were sold to Japan for US$3.2 million.

Critical reception was highly positive, with critics describing it as "organic, essential, beautifully staged and refreshingly realistic." Derek Elley from Variety magazine described the film as "a tour de force of noirish style and Korean ultra-violence that will have genre fans nailed to their seats." Sam Toy from Empire stated Lee "puts in a star-making performance as the brutal chief whip-turned-fugitive, never overplaying what could easily become hammy and clichéd, and easily holds this Korean noir together." He added "this is hugely enjoyable, and beautifully brutal."

Lee Byung-hun was praised for his acting ability with a critic from Cinema Eye saying that he "brings sheer excitement in his performance" and is "an angel dressed in vengeance." The critic also noted that A Bittersweet Life is "the best film of 2005." A critic from BeyondHollywood.com gave the film 4/5 stars. On Rotten Tomatoes, it currently holds a 100%, with an average score of 8.1 out of 10 based on ten reviews.

In 2009, Empire named it third in a poll of the "20 Greatest Gangster Movies You've Never Seen* (*Probably)."

When the film finally ended its theatrical run, it had 1,291,621 admissions.

== Remake ==
The 2007 Indian film Awarapan contained plot elements similar to the film. The film, directed by Mohit Suri, starred Emraan Hashmi, Shriya Saran and Ashutosh Rana. In August 2017, an American remake was announced, with Jennifer Yuh Nelson to direct and Michael B. Jordan to star. In November 2024, Kevin McMullin became attached to write for Netflix.

== Awards and nominations ==
2005 42nd Grand Bell Awards

- Best Supporting Actor – Hwang Jung-min
- Nomination – Best Film
- Nomination – Best Director – Kim Jee-woon
- Nomination – Best Actor – Lee Byung-hun
- Nomination – Best Cinematography – Kim Ji-yong
- Nomination – Best Editing – Choi Jae-keun
- Nomination – Best Lighting – Shin Sang-ryeol
- Nomination – Best Art Direction – Ryu Seong-hui
- Nomination – Best Music – Jang Young-gyu, Dalparan
- Nomination – Best Visual Effects – Kim Wook (DTI), Kwak Tae-yong (CELL), Demolition
- Nomination – Best Sound – Kim Kyung-tae, Choi Tae-young (Live Zone)

2005 13th Chunsa Film Art Awards

- Best Actor – Lee Byung-hun

2005 25th Korean Association of Film Critics Awards

- Top 10 Films
- Best Actor – Lee Byung-hun
- Best Music – Dalparan, Jang Young-gyu

2005 26th Blue Dragon Film Awards

- Best Cinematography – Kim Ji-yong
- Nomination – Best Director – Kim Jee-woon
- Nomination – Best Leading Actor – Lee Byung-hun
- Nomination – Best Supporting Actor – Hwang Jung-min
- Nomination – Best Lighting – Shin Sang-ryeol
- Nomination – Best Art Direction – Ryu Seong-hui
- Nomination – Best Music – Dalparan and Jang Young-gyu

2005 4th Korean Film Awards

- Best Supporting Actor – Hwang Jung-min

2006 42nd Baeksang Arts Awards

- Best Actor – Lee Byung-hun
- Nomination – Best Director – Kim Jee-woon

2005 38th Sitges Film Festival

- Best Original Soundtrack – Dalparan and Jang Young-gyu
- Nomination – Best Film

2006 8th Deauville Asian Film Festival

- Lotus Action Asia – Grand Prix Action Asia, Action Asia Prize

2006 10th Fantasia Film Festival

- Silver Prize, Best Asian Film
- Best Cinematography – Kim Ji-yong
