= Ashfall (film) =

South Korean film

- Theatrical release poster
- Hangul: 백두산
- Hanja: 白頭山
- RR: Baekdusan
- MR: Paektusan
- Directed by: Lee Hae-jun; Kim Byung-seo
- Written by: Lee Hae-jun; Kim Byung-seo
- Produced by: Kim Yong-hwa; Park Ji-sung; Ha Jung-woo
- Starring: Lee Byung-hun; Ha Jung-woo; Ma Dong-seok; Jeon Hye-jin; Bae Suzy
- Cinematography: Kim Ji-yong
- Edited by: Kim Hye-jin; Kim Jin-oh
- Music by: Bang Jun-seok
- Production companies: Dexter Studios; CJ E&M
- Distributed by: CJ Entertainment
- Release date: 19 December 2019
- Running time: 128 minutes
- Country: South Korea
- Language: Korean
- Budget: US$17.7 million
- Box office: US$61.3 million

Ashfall (Korean: 백두산; RR: Baekdusan), also known as Mount Paektu, is a 2019 South Korean disaster film directed by Lee Hae-jun and Kim Byung-seo, starring Lee Byung-hun, Ha Jung-woo, Ma Dong-seok, Jeon Hye-jin and Bae Suzy. The film was released in December 2019 in South Korea.

== Plot ==
Paektu Mountain, an active volcano straddling the China–North Korea border, suddenly erupts, causing severe earthquakes in both North and South Korea. Pandemonium ensues on the Korean Peninsula, with more eruptions predicted in the area. To prevent another disaster, Jeon Yoo-kyung plans an operation based on a theory by Professor Kang Bong-rae, who had studied Mount Baekdu and its possible future eruptions. The plan is to detonate a nuclear bomb near the mine located near Mount Paektu to release the built-up pressure to stop further eruption.

Jo In-chang is assigned to be the captain of a special forces team taking part in the operation. Jo In-chang contacts Lee Joon-pyeong who is part of the Korean People's Army in North Korea as a spy. Meanwhile, Jo In-Chang's pregnant wife Choi Ji-young is alone in Seoul and struggling to survive amidst the disaster.

In-Chang departs with his team on a plane, and they parachute after their airplane malfunctions. They locate Joon-pyeong, who was being held in a North Korean prison, and seek his knowledge in finding the correct mine closest to Paektu's caldera. After threatening his dying wife to disclose the location of his daughter, Joon-pyeong guides In-chang's team to a power station, and they extract a piece of uranium from a nuclear missile. This alerts the American garrison in South Korea, which sends soldiers to stop Joon-pyeong from delivering the uranium piece to several gangsters from China.

Meanwhile, Ji-young encounters a tsunami while she was on the way to evacuate from Seoul. She manages to survive and eventually rescued by the US military, and met Professor Kang, who was also evacuating to the United States after his disillusioned feelings with the South Korean government. Due to the earthquake, Ji-young and the evacuees cannot board the ship bound for America and Professor Kang helps her, and he decides to stay to continue helping the South Korean military to prevent the final eruption of Mount Paektu. At the military base, where the US military took control from the South Korean army, Yoo-kyung steals the military documents and sneaks out to meet Kang and Ji-young at a secluded place to contact In-chang.

Back at the North, In-chang and Joon-pyeong evade the Americans and reach Bocheon, a town near Paektu Mountain. Joon-pyeong meets his frightened daughter Soon-ok, and just as the Chinese gangsters was about to kill him for failing to deliver the uranium, In-chang gives the uranium, but sets its timer to coincide with Paektu's eruption. Although the American soldiers also arrive to take the uranium, they and the Chinese gangsters flee when Mt. Baekdu erupts again, triggering more earthquakes. After Professor Kang updated In-chang about the location of the final eruption, In-chang and Joon-pyeong bring the uranium to an abandoned mine (which was the same location where the final eruption would take place). Joon-pyeong takes the bomb into the mine's depths, leaving In-chang to go with Soon-ok, whom he adopts. The uranium bomb explodes and while Joon-pyeong was killed, the bomb's detonation stops the earthquakes, saving many lives in the Korean peninsula.

One year later, North and South Korea together oversee the reconstruction of the peninsula. In-chang and Ji-young have a baby son, along with Soon-Ok, keeping his promise to Ri that he will look after her.

== Cast ==
- Lee Byung-hun as Lee Joon-pyeong (Chosongul: 이준평, I Jun-pyeong)
- Ha Jung-woo as Captain Jo In-chang (조인창 대위, Jo In-chang Daewi)
- Ma Dong-seok as Professor Kang Bong-rae (강봉래, Gang Bong-lae)
- Jeon Hye-jin as Jeon Yoo-kyung (전유경, Jeon Yu-gyeong)
- Bae Suzy as Choi Ji-young, In-chang's pregnant wife (최지영, Choe Ji-yeong)

Also appearing in the film are Lee Geung-young as General Choi of the Republic of Korea Army; Kim Si-a as Sun-ok, Joon-pyeong's daughter; Lee Sang-won as Sergeant Park Tae-sik; Ok Ja-yeon as Sergeant Min; and Jo Han-chul as a colonel. Jeon Do-yeon also makes a cameo appearance as Sun-hwa, Joon-pyeong's wife. Byeon Woo-seok has a bit part as a bodyguard, while Yang Dae-hyuk appears as an agent.

== Production ==
Production on Ashfall ended on 21 July after five months of filming.

Kim Yong-hwa was in charge of production, and Dexter Studio, represented by Kim Yong-hwa, was in charge of VFX and co-produced and distributed with CJ. It is a co-directed work by Lee Hae-joon and Kim Byung-seo.

== Release ==
The film was released 19 December 2019 in South Korea. Internationally, it was released on 20 December in the United States, 24 December in Taiwan, 1 January 2020 in Hong Kong, 2 January in Singapore and Malaysia, 8 January in Indonesia, the day after in Thailand and Australia, and 31 January in Vietnam.

== Reception ==
=== Critical response ===
On review aggregator Rotten Tomatoes, the film holds an approval rating of 73% based on 11 reviews, with an average rating of 5.8/10.

=== Box office ===
On 22 December at 11 a.m. KST, "Ashfall" officially surpassed 2 million moviegoers, taking just four days to reach the milestone. Notably, the film had just reached 1 million moviegoers just the day before.

=== Accolades ===
At the 56th Grand Bell Awards, the movie earned 4 nominations and won 2 awards.

| Awards | Category | Recipients | Result | Ref. |
|---|---|---|---|---|
| 56th Grand Bell Awards | Best Actor | Lee Byung-hun | Won | |
| 56th Grand Bell Awards | Technical Award (Visual Effects) | Andras Ikladi | Won | |
| 56th Grand Bell Awards | Best Music | Bang Jun-Seok | Nominated | |
| 56th Grand Bell Awards | Best Lighting | Cho Kyu-young | Nominated | |

=== Criticism ===
The film was criticized by North Korea because Paektu Mountain has a significant place in North Korea. This is because Paektu Mountain is featured on the Emblem of North Korea and is used by North Korea for propaganda purposes.
