= The Fortress (2017 film) =

- Theatrical release poster
- Hangul: 남한산성
- Hanja: 南漢山城
- RR: Namhansanseong
- MR: Namhansansŏng
- Directed by: Hwang Dong-hyuk
- Screenplay by: Hwang Dong-hyuk
- Based on: Namhansanseong by Kim Hoon
- Produced by: Kim Ji-yeon
- Starring: Lee Byung-hun; Kim Yoon-seok
- Cinematography: Kim Ji-yong
- Edited by: Nam Na-yeong
- Music by: Ryuichi Sakamoto
- Production company: Siren Pictures
- Distributed by: CJ Entertainment
- Release date: October 3, 2017 (South Korea)
- Running time: 139 minutes
- Country: South Korea
- Languages: Korean; Manchu
- Box office: US$29.2 million

The Fortress (Korean: 남한산성) is a 2017 South Korean epic historical drama film directed by Hwang Dong-hyuk, starring Lee Byung-hun and Kim Yoon-seok. It is based on the novel Namhansanseong by Kim Hoon.

== Plot ==
The film is set during the Qing invasion of Joseon in 1636, when King Injo and his retainers sought refuge in the fortress located in Namhansanseong.

== Cast ==
=== Main ===
- Lee Byung-hun as Choi Myung-kil

A leader of one of the two ideological cliques that battles in the fortress trying to decide whether to make peace or fight against the Qing dynasty.

- Kim Yoon-seok as Kim Sang-hun

The other leader of the ideological clique who battles with Choi's opinion and firmly believes in defending the nation's dignity by fighting against the Qing dynasty.

- Park Hae-il as King Injo

The king who is in agony in the tense conflicts between his men over the fate of the nation.

- Go Soo as Seo Nal-soe

A blacksmith sent out with a king's letter to recruit loyal forces.

- Park Hee-soon as Lee Shi-baek

The commander of the Namhansanseong garrison, silently defending the mountain fortress in the extreme cold weather conditions.

=== Supporting ===
- Song Young-chang as Kim Ryoo
- Jo Woo-jin as Jung Myung-soo
- Lee David as Chil-bok
- Heo Sung-tae as Yonggoldae
- Kim Beop-rae as Hong Taiji
- Jo Ah-in as Na-roo
- Jin Seon-kyu as Lee Doo-gap
- Yoo Soon-woong as Chief Scholar
- Park Ji-il as Deputy Chief Scholar
- Choi Jong-ryul as Eunuch
- Kim Joong-ki as First Secretary

== Production ==
In 2011, Kim Hoon sold the rights to his novel Namhansanseong to his own daughter, film producer Kim Ji-yeon.

== Release and reception ==
The film was released in South Korean cinemas on October 3, 2017. It topped the box office on its opening day with 444,527 viewers. According to the film's distributor CJ Entertainment, by the second day of its release, the film had accumulated more than one million admissions, the fastest film released during the Chuseok holidays to surpass the mark.

The Fortress was sold to 28 countries worldwide including U.S.A, Japan, Taiwan and Singapore. It was the opening film at the 2nd London East Asia Film Festival. In South Korea, the film attracted a total of 3.8 million moviegoers.

On the review aggregator website Rotten Tomatoes, 63% of 8 critics' reviews are positive, with an average rating of 6.30/10.

== Awards and nominations ==
Award	Category	Recipient	Result	Ref.
37th Korean Association of Film Critics Awards	Best Film	The Fortress	Won	
37th Korean Association of Film Critics Awards	Best Director	Hwang Dong-hyuk	Won	
37th Korean Association of Film Critics Awards	Best Cinematography	Kim Jee-yong	Won	
37th Korean Association of Film Critics Awards	Best Music	Ryuichi Sakamoto	Won	
37th Korean Association of Film Critics Awards	Top 10 Films	The Fortress	Won	
38th Blue Dragon Film Awards	Best Film	The Fortress	Nominated	
38th Blue Dragon Film Awards	Best Director	Hwang Dong-hyuk	Nominated	
38th Blue Dragon Film Awards	Best Actor	Kim Yoon-seok	Nominated	
38th Blue Dragon Film Awards	Best Actor	Lee Byung-hun	Nominated	
38th Blue Dragon Film Awards	Best Screenplay	Hwang Dong-hyuk	Won	
38th Blue Dragon Film Awards	Best Cinematography and Lighting	Kim Jee-yong & Jo Gyu-young	Nominated	
38th Blue Dragon Film Awards	Best Music	Ryuichi Sakamoto	Nominated	
38th Blue Dragon Film Awards	Best Art Direction	Chae Kyung-seon	Nominated	
4th Korean Film Producers Association Awards	Best Film	The Fortress	Won	
4th Korean Film Producers Association Awards	Best Editing	Nam Na-yeong	Won	
4th Korean Film Producers Association Awards	Best Sound	Choi Tae-young	Won	
12th Asian Film Awards	Best Cinematography	Kim Jee-yong	Won	
12th Asian Film Awards	Best Sound	Choi Tae-young	Nominated	
54th Baeksang Arts Awards	Grand Prize (Film)	Kim Yoon-seok	Nominated	
54th Baeksang Arts Awards	Best Film	The Fortress	Won	
54th Baeksang Arts Awards	Best Director	Hwang Dong-hyuk	Nominated	
23rd Chunsa Film Art Awards	Best Director	Hwang Dong-hyuk	Won	
23rd Chunsa Film Art Awards	Best Actor	Lee Byung-hun	Nominated	
23rd Chunsa Film Art Awards	Technical Award	Kim Jee-yong	Won	
27th Buil Film Awards	Best Film	The Fortress	Nominated	
27th Buil Film Awards	Best Director	Hwang Dong-hyuk	Nominated	
27th Buil Film Awards	Best Screenplay	Hwang Dong-hyuk	Nominated	
27th Buil Film Awards	Best Cinematography	Kim Jee-yong	Nominated	
27th Buil Film Awards	Best Music	Ryuichi Sakamoto	Nominated	
27th Buil Film Awards	Best Art Direction	Chae Kyung-seon	Nominated	
55th Grand Bell Awards	Best Film	The Fortress	Nominated	
55th Grand Bell Awards	Best Director	Hwang Dong-hyuk	Nominated	
55th Grand Bell Awards	Best Actor	Lee Byung-hun	Nominated	
55th Grand Bell Awards	Best Screenplay	Hwang Dong-hyuk	Nominated	
55th Grand Bell Awards	Best Cinematography	Kim Jee-yong	Won	
55th Grand Bell Awards	Best Editing	Nam Na-young	Nominated	
55th Grand Bell Awards	Best Art Direction	Chae Kyung-seon	Nominated	
55th Grand Bell Awards	Best Lightning	Jo Kyu-young	Won	
55th Grand Bell Awards	Best Costume Design	Jo Sang-kyung	Nominated	
55th Grand Bell Awards	Best Music	Ryuichi Sakamoto	Won	
2nd The Seoul Awards	Best Film	The Fortress	Nominated	
2nd The Seoul Awards	Best Actor	Lee Byung-hun	Nominated	
Camerimage	Golden Frog	Kim Jee-yong	Won	
