= Bungee Jumping of Their Own =

2001 film by Kim Dae-seung

- Poster for Bungee Jumping of Their Own
- Hangul: 번지점프를 하다
- RR: Beonji jeompeureul hada
- MR: Pŏnji chŏmp'ŭrŭl hada
- Directed by: Kim Dae-seung
- Written by: Go Eun-nim
- Produced by: Choi Nak-kwon
- Starring: Lee Byung-hun; Lee Eun-ju; Yeo Hyun-soo; Hong Soo-hyun
- Cinematography: Lee Hu-gon
- Edited by: Park Yoo-kyeong
- Music by: Park Ho-jun
- Production companies: Noon Entertainment; KTB Network
- Distributed by: The Walt Disney Company Korea (through Buena Vista International Korea)
- Release date: February 2, 2001 (South Korea)
- Running time: 99 minutes
- Country: South Korea
- Language: Korean

Bungee Jumping of Their Own (Korean: 번지점프를 하다) is a 2001 South Korean romantic drama film starring Lee Byung-hun and Lee Eun-ju. The film had 947,000 admissions, making it the 10th most attended film of 2001 in South Korea.

== Plot ==
In 1983, Seo In-woo (Lee Byung-hun) is attending university in Seoul. One rainy night, he has a chance encounter with a woman who shares his umbrella as they walk to the bus stop. He becomes infatuated with her, feeling he has experienced love at first sight. He later discovers the woman is In Tae-hee (Lee Eun-ju), an art student at the same university, and begins crashing her classes to spend more time with her. Their relationship intensifies on a school trip to the mountains, and Tae-hee gifts In-woo a gold lighter with a custom engraving of her face. Shortly after, Tae-hee is unexpectedly hit by a truck and killed.

17 years later, In-woo has become a high school teacher, and is married with an infant daughter. Im Hyun-bin (Yeo Hyun-soo), who is known for his raunchy jokes and aggressive flirting with female student Yeo Hye-su (Hong Soo-hyun), is placed in In-woo's homeroom class at the start of a new school year. In-woo begins to notice similarities between Hyun-bin and Tae-hee and becomes infatuated with the male student; he makes phone calls to Hyun-bin after school hours and finds excuses to casually touch his shoulders. He experiences a crisis of sexuality, struggling to be intimate with his wife and seeking psychiatric evaluation.

Hyun-bin and Hye-su start going steady. During one of their dates, Hyun-bin discovers the gold lighter for sale at a market. Feeling drawn to the engraved image of Tae-hee, he takes it to school and sketches her face during class. In-woo catches this and has a public outburst, which sparks gossip in the school that he is a homosexual pursuing Hyun-bin. As his social status is threatened, Hyun-bin begins to lash out against In-woo. The rumors intensify, and In-woo is harassed by his students, fired from his job, and left by his wife.

After a nighttime confrontation, Hyun-bin questions his own feelings for In-woo. He breaks up with Hye-su, and continues to be mesmerized by Tae-hee's face on the lighter. One day, while staring at the lighter in class, he suddenly remembers Tae-hee's first meeting with In-woo. He races out of class and visits locations that were important to Tae-hee and In-woo's relationship, regaining more of her memories as he does. He realizes that he was Tae-hee in his past life, that he is her reincarnated form.

Hyun-bin, now fully realized as Tae-hee, tracks down In-woo in a train station. The pair are soulmates, destined to find each other in every life. They travel to New Zealand and sign up for bungee jumping in the mountains. There, they instead commit suicide by falling, so that they can be reborn as the same age and fall in love again.

== Cast ==
- Lee Byung-hun as Seo In-woo
- Lee Eun-ju as In Tae-hee
- Yeo Hyun-soo as Im Hyun-bin
- Hong Soo-hyun as Yeo Hye-su
- Lee Beom-soo as Lee Dae-geun
- Jeon Mi-seon as In-woo's wife
- Namkoong Min as Kim Sung-chul
- Park Chul-min as P.E. teacher
- Go Jun as Shin Yeong-ho
- Kim Jung-young as English teacher
- Kim Kap-soo as sculpture professor (cameo)

== Awards ==
2001 Baeksang Arts Awards

- Best Screenplay: Go Eun-nim
- Best New Actor: Yeo Hyun-soo

2001 Grand Bell Awards

- Best Screenplay: Go Eun-nim

2001 Blue Dragon Film Awards

- Best Screenplay: Go Eun-nim
- Best New Director: Kim Dae-seung

== Film festivals ==
It was selected to appear in the 2002 Frameline Film Festival and the 2004 Korean Film Festival DC.

== Adaptations ==
A stage musical entitled Bungee Jump was produced in 2012, with lyrics by Hue Park and music by American composer Will Aronson. The production was successful and won the award for best score at the 7th Musical Awards and the 18th Korea Musical Awards.

It has been remade in Thai film titled Dew in 2019 by Chookiat Sakveerakul, with lead role by Sukollawat Kanarot.

On November 2, 2021, it was announced that Jeong Yun o and Lee Hyun-wook will appear in the OTT drama remake of the movie in the roles of Im Hyun-bin and Seo In woo. On December 9, it was announced that the remake had been cancelled due to concerns from the original screenwriter. The original screenwriter opposed the remake due to his newly found Christian beliefs, which are against the theme of homosexuality, suicide and rebirth which are main plot points in the film.
