= Inside Men (film) =

2015 South Korean film by Woo Min-ho

- Theatrical release poster
- Hangul: 내부자들
- Hanja: 内部者들
- RR: Naebujadeul
- MR: Naebujadŭl
- Directed by: Woo Min-ho
- Written by: Woo Min-ho
- Based on: The Insiders by Yoon Tae-ho
- Produced by: Lee Min-su
- Starring: Lee Byung-hun; Cho Seung-woo; Baek Yoon-sik
- Cinematography: Go Nak-seon
- Edited by: Kim Sang-bum; Kim Jae-bum
- Music by: Jo Yeong-wook
- Distributed by: Showbox
- Release date: November 19, 2015
- Running time: 130 minutes
- Country: South Korea
- Language: Korean
- Box office: US$63 million

Inside Men (Korean: 내부자들; RR: Naebujadeul) is a 2015 South Korean political action thriller film written and directed by Woo Min-ho, based on Yoon Tae-ho's webtoon The Insiders, that dissects the corruption within Korean society. Starring Lee Byung-hun, Cho Seung-woo and Baek Yoon-sik, it began filming in July 2014 and was released in theaters on November 19, 2015.

Inside Men and the director's cut Inside Men: The Original have sold a total of 9.1 million admissions at the box office, thus becoming the top grossing R-rated movie of all-time at the South Korean box office.

== Plot ==
Two years before the 2012 presidential election, ambitious prosecutor Woo Jang-hoon is assigned to investigate leading presidential candidate Jang Pil-woo's secret slush fund. A former accounting manager agrees to hand over incriminating files, but he is kidnapped by gangster Ahn Sang-goo, who steals the evidence for influential newspaper editor Lee Kang-hee. Trusting Lee completely, Sang-goo gives him a copy of the original files. Soon afterward, however, Sang-goo discovers he has been betrayed. Lee secretly exposes his actions to Pil-woo's associates, and Sang-goo is brutally tortured by Managing Director Jo, who severs his right hand before having him locked away in a psychiatric hospital to disappear.

Two years later, Sang-goo has escaped the institution and lives in obscurity while secretly plotting revenge against the men who ruined him. Meanwhile, Jang-hoon suffers a professional setback after a bank executive under investigation commits suicide, leaving behind a note blaming the prosecution. Suspended from active duty, Jang-hoon begins investigating Sang-goo independently. Sang-goo attempts to expose the conspirators by secretly recording their sex parties with hidden cameras, but the plan fails as Lee stays one step ahead, leading to the capture and torture of Sang-goo's associate, Park Jong-pal.

After Jo's men track Sang-goo down, Jang-hoon rescues him during a violent confrontation and hides him in his father's old bookstore. The pair form an alliance when Sang-goo reveals that he has secretly kept the original slush fund files hidden inside his cross necklace all along. To make the evidence public, Sang-goo holds a press conference exposing the corruption and willingly goes to prison. However, Pil-woo denies everything and Lee uses his newspaper to destroy Sang-goo's reputation with fabricated stories. Key witnesses are silenced, including actress Joo Eun-hye, who is murdered by Jo after helping Sang-goo.

Consumed by rage after learning Lee willingly betrayed him from the beginning, Sang-goo escapes custody and confronts the editor. He forces Lee to confess that Pil-woo orchestrated everything, including Eun-hye's murder and the smear campaign against Sang-goo, before cutting off Lee's right hand in revenge. Although Sang-goo records the confession, Jang-hoon realizes it is legally inadmissible because it was obtained under duress. Instead, he manipulates Lee into believing he has switched sides and gains the trust of Pil-woo's inner circle, earning a prestigious position in the Supreme Prosecutors' Office.

At a gathering hosted by Pil-woo and his allies, Jang-hoon secretly records the politicians and businessmen openly discussing their crimes using a hidden camera concealed in a liquor bottle cap. After Pil-woo secures his party's presidential nomination, the recordings are anonymously released to the public alongside the original financial documents. Jang-hoon then steps forward at a press conference, revealing himself as the whistleblower and admitting his own role in infiltrating the conspiracy. His testimony, combined with the leaked footage, triggers nationwide outrage. Lee comes under investigation, while Pil-woo goes into hiding before becoming the subject of a nationwide manhunt.

Six months later, Jang-hoon has left the prosecution and opened a small law office, where he reunites with Sang-goo after his release from prison. Rather than pursuing political power himself, Jang-hoon rejects becoming another man like Pil-woo. The two men leave together, finally free from the corruption that consumed their lives.

== Cast ==
- Lee Byung-hun as Ahn Sang-goo
- Cho Seung-woo as Woo Jang-hoon
- Baek Yoon-sik as Lee Kang-hee
- Lee Geung-young as Jang Pil-woo
- Kim Hong-pa as Oh Hyun-soo
- Lee El as Joo Eun-hye
- Jung Man-sik as Choi Choong-sik
- Kim Byeong-ok as Oh Myung-hwan
- Kim Eui-sung as Editor-in-chief in Joguk Ilbo
- Jo Jae-yoon as Section chief Bang
- Bae Seong-woo as Park Jong-pal
- Kim Dae-myung as Go Sang-chul
- Jo Woo-jin as Managing director Jo
- Park Jin-woo as Department head Lee
- Nam Il-woo as Woo Jang-hoon's father
- Kwon Hyeok-poong as Seok Myeong-gwan
- Ryu Tae-ho as Moon Il-seok
- Park Sang-gyoo as Kim Seok-woo
- Kwon Tae-won as Song Man-seob
- Jo Deok-je as Detective Choi
- Park Jin-young as Member of parliament Son
- Shin Ji-soo as Penthouse girl

== Release ==
The film was released theatrically in South Korea in November 19, 2015. Following its commercial success, an extended director's cut, titled Inside Men: The Original, was released theatrically on December 31. Running approximately 180 minutes, the extended version incorporated additional footage not included in the original theatrical release.

== Reception ==
On its first four days at the South Korean box office, the film grossed ₩13.2 billion. Inside Men drew more than 2 million viewers in just six days, a record for an R-rated film; it has also set the record for the most-viewed R-rated movie in a single day—489,503 viewers.

== Accolades ==
| Year | Award | Category | Recipient | Result |
|---|---|---|---|---|
| 2016 | 52nd Baeksang Arts Awards | Best Film | Inside Men | Nominated |
| 2016 | 52nd Baeksang Arts Awards | Best Director | Woo Min-ho | Nominated |
| 2016 | 52nd Baeksang Arts Awards | Best Actor | Lee Byung-hun | Won |
| 2016 | 52nd Baeksang Arts Awards | Best Actor | Baek Yoon-sik | Nominated |
| 2016 | 52nd Baeksang Arts Awards | Best Screenplay | Woo Min-ho | Nominated |
| 2016 | 25th Buil Film Awards | Best Film | Inside Men | Nominated |
| 2016 | 25th Buil Film Awards | Best Actor | Lee Byung-hun | Won |
| 2016 | 25th Buil Film Awards | Best Screenplay | Woo Min-ho | Nominated |
| 2016 | 37th Blue Dragon Film Awards | Best Film | Inside Men | Won |
| 2016 | 37th Blue Dragon Film Awards | Best Director | Woo Min-ho | Nominated |
| 2016 | 37th Blue Dragon Film Awards | Best Screenplay | Woo Min-ho | Nominated |
| 2016 | 37th Blue Dragon Film Awards | Best Actor | Lee Byung-hun | Won |
| 2016 | 37th Blue Dragon Film Awards | Best New Actor | Joo Woo-jin | Nominated |
| 2016 | 37th Blue Dragon Film Awards | Best Editing | Kim Sang-bum, Kim Jae-bum | Nominated |
| 2016 | 53rd Grand Bell Awards | Best Film | Inside Men | Won |
| 2016 | 53rd Grand Bell Awards | Best Director | Woo Min-ho | Won |
| 2016 | 53rd Grand Bell Awards | Best Actor | Lee Byung-hun | Won |
| 2016 | 53rd Grand Bell Awards | Best Supporting Actor | Lee Geung-young | Nominated |
| 2016 | 53rd Grand Bell Awards | Best Supporting Actress | Lee El | Nominated |
| 2016 | 53rd Grand Bell Awards | Best Screenplay | Woo Min-ho | Won |
| 2016 | 53rd Grand Bell Awards | Best Planning | Kim Won-kook | Won |
| 2016 | 11th Max Movie Awards | Best Film | Inside Men | Nominated |
| 2016 | 11th Max Movie Awards | Best Director | Woo Min-ho | Nominated |
| 2016 | 11th Max Movie Awards | Best Actor | Lee Byung-hun | Nominated |
| 2016 | 11th Max Movie Awards | Best Supporting Actor | Baek Yoon-sik | Nominated |
| 2016 | 11th Max Movie Awards | Best Trailer | Inside Men | Nominated |
| 2016 | 10th Asian Film Awards | Best Actor | Lee Byung-hun | Won |
| 2016 | 10th Asian Film Awards | Best Production Designer | Cho Hwa-sung | Nominated |
| 2016 | 21st Chunsa Film Art Awards | Best Director | Woo Min-ho | Nominated |
| 2016 | 21st Chunsa Film Art Awards | Best Actor | Lee Byung-hun | Nominated |
| 2016 | 21st Chunsa Film Art Awards | Best Screenplay | Woo Min-ho | Nominated |
| 2016 | 21st Chunsa Film Art Awards | Best Supporting Actor | Baek Yoon-sik | Nominated |
| 2016 | 16th Director's Cut Awards | Best Actor | Lee Byung-hun | Won |
| 2016 | 36th Korean Association of Film Critics Awards | Best Actor | Lee Byung-hun | Won |
| 2016 | 36th Korean Association of Film Critics Awards | Ten Best Films of the Year | Inside Men | Won |
| 2016 | 3rd Korean Film Producers Association Awards | Best Actor | Lee Byung-hun | Won |
| 2016 | 5th Marie Claire Film Festival | Pioneer Award | Lee Byung-hun | Won |
| 2016 | 15th New York Asian Film Festival | Star Asia Award | Lee Byung-hun | Won |
| 2016 | 4th Marie Claire Asia Star Awards | Actor of the Year | Lee Byung-hun | Won |
