= All In (TV series) =

2003 South Korean television series

- Promotional poster
- Hangul: 올인
- RR: Orin
- MR: Orin
- Genre: Action; Romance; Drama
- Written by: Choi Wan-kyu
- Directed by: Yoo Chul-yong; Kang Shin-hyo
- Starring: Lee Byung-hun; Song Hye-kyo; Ji Sung; Park Sol-mi
- Music by: Kim Hyeong-seok
- Opening theme: "Just Like the First Day" by Park Yong-ha
- Country of origin: South Korea
- Original languages: Korean; English; Japanese
- No. of episodes: 24

Production
- Production locations: Seoul; Jeju; Los Angeles; Las Vegas
- Running time: 60 minutes Wednesdays and Thursdays at 21:55 (KST)
- Production company: Chorokbaem Media

Original release
- Network: SBS TV
- Release: 15 January – 3 April 2003

Related
- Swallow the Sun

All In (Korean: 올인; RR: Orin) is a 2003 South Korean television drama series that aired on SBS TV from 15 January to 3 April 2003, on Wednesdays and Thursdays at 21:55 (KST) for 24 episodes. Inspired by the life of professional poker player Jimmy Cha, it starred Lee Byung-hun and Song Hye-kyo in a story about one's man's rise through the fiercely competitive world of casino gambling as he clashes with his rivals over money, success, and love.

The drama was a ratings success in South Korea, with its final episode reaching a peak viewership rating of 47.7%, the 10th highest rated episode of any Korean series aired between 2000 and 2008. It also won several awards, notably the Grand Prize ("Daesang") for Lee Byung-hun at the 2003 SBS Drama Awards.

== Synopsis ==
Orphaned then taken in by his gambler uncle, Kim In-ha (Jin Goo) often hangs out with his friends in the basement of a movie theater. He unexpectedly befriends Choi Jung-won, a model student and the rich son of the theater owner. In-ha and Jung-won both fall for Min Su-yeon (Song Hye-kyo), the daughter of the projectionist at the theater.

When Su-yeon's father was killed by loan sharks, In-ha and Jung-won hatch a plan to avenge Su-yeon by setting fire to a gangster's hideout. But the fire spreads, accidentally killing the gang leader. In-ha is sentenced to seven years, while thanks to his family connections, Jung-won avoids jail time. As In-ha serves his sentence, Jung-won goes to the United States to study and Su-yeon decides to become a nun.

Seven years pass, and by pure chance, the three all end up working at the same casino. In-ha (Lee Byung-hun) and Su-yeon (Song Hye-kyo) fall in love, but are later separated when In-ha is forced to illegally immigrate to the U.S. He finds a job as a mafia hitman, and by a stroke of luck, again meets Su-yeon, and the two plan to get married. However, on their supposed wedding day, In-ha suffers a near-fatal gunshot wound and becomes comatose for 8 months. Unaware that In-ha is alive, the grieving Su-yeon returns to Korea.

In-ha eventually recovers, but Jung-won (Ji Sung) intervenes, saying that he is unworthy to love Su-yeon. In-ha decides to turn his life of misery around and becomes a professional gambler. He meets a business partner and, betting everything he has, returns to Korea to win back Su-yeon's love.

== Cast ==
=== Main ===
- Lee Byung-hun as Kim In-ha
  - Jin Goo as young In-ha
- Song Hye-kyo as Min Su-yeon / Sister Angela
  - Han Ji-min as young Su-yeon
- Ji Sung as Choi Jung-won
  - Go Dong-hyeon as young Jung-won
- Park Sol-mi as Seo Jin-hee
  - Shin Ah as young Jin-hee

=== Supporting ===
- Lee Deok-hwa as Choi Do-hwan, Jung-won's father
- Sunwoo Eun-sook as Yoon Hye-sun, Jung-won's mother
- Im Hyun-sik as Kim Chi-soo, In-ha's uncle
- Park Won-sook as Jang Hyun-ja
- Jo Kyung-hwan as Chairman Seo Seung-don, Jin-hee's father
- Kim Tae-yeon as Jenny
- Huh Joon-ho as Yoo Jong-gu, In-ha's friend from prison
- Choi Jung-won as Yoo Jung-ae, Hyun-ja's daughter
- Choi Joon-yong as Park Tae-joon, In-ha's hometown friend who became a detective
- Yoon Gi-won as Woo Yong-tae, In-ha's hometown friend who became a waiter
- Baek Seung-hyeon as Yang Shi-bong, In-ha's hometown friend who is crippled
- Jung Yoo-seok as Im Dae-soo ("Shorty")
- Jung Ho-bin as Jung Joon-il
- Park Jung-woo as Jjagoo
- Im Dae-ho as Chun Sang-gu
- Yoon Seo-hyun as Man-soo
- Hong Yeo-jin as bar hostess
- Cho Yeon-woo as yakuza
- Kim Byung-se as Michael Jang
- Yuko Fueki as Rie Ochida
- Kim Hee-jung as office clerk
- Park Sang-myun as Im Dae-chi, gang boss
- Kim Ha-kyun as Director Son
- Choi Ran as Manager Jang Mi-ran
- Park Joon-hee as Jo Jung-min
- Gi Ju-bong as Bae Sang-doo
- Gianni Russo as Falcone, the American mob boss

== Production ==
=== Development and casting ===
All In was adapted from the novel of the same name by Noh Seung-il, inspired by the life of poker player Jimmy Cha. The title All In comes from a term in poker that refers to betting one's entire stake. Though the plot was adapted from the novel, the characters were wholly original to the drama.

In 2000, SBS drama production team director Lee Jong-su first approached Jimmy Cha, whom the original novel was based on, to adapt the novel for a TV series, but Cha rejected the offer due to Korea's negative attitude towards gambling. Lee later approached Cha twice, requesting to make a series about Cha's mother. Cha turned the offer down both times, but the project was already at the casting stage. A meeting was held, and screenwriter Choi Wan-gyu suggested changing the concept to focus more on Jimmy Cha's life as a whole.

Lee Byung-hun had already been cast as the main role, but his female counterpart had not been decided on; actors considered for the role included Lee Young-ae, Song Yoon-ah, Kim Hee-sun, and Shin Eun-kyung. The producers then suggested Song Hye-kyo to Jimmy Cha, and Cha gave SBS the OK to cast her. Additionally, Joo Sang-wook was supposed to play the young version of Lee Byung-hun's character, but he was replaced by Jin Goo last minute. Gianni Russo, known to international audiences as Carlo in The Godfather, appears in a few episodes as Falcone, the American mafia boss.

=== Filming ===
Filming began on 9 September 2002 and took place in several locations. An outdoor set was built in Jeju Island, for which the island provided 200 million Korean won. Most scenes filmed in Jeju were shot on the Seopjikoji coast, located in the city Seogwipo. From 28 November to 31 December 2002, location filming took place in the United States, with the casino scenes being filmed in Las Vegas. The kiss scene between Song Hye-kyo and Lee Byung-hun was filmed over two days, moving from Los Angeles to Las Vegas. Production costs reached 250 million won per episode to a total budget of over 5 billion won, at that time the highest for a Korean miniseries.

During the drama's filming, SBS promised they would stop broadcasting smoking scenes in their TV dramas. All In, which started production before the announcement, had scenes where characters smoked – as many of the scenes as possible were removed in editing, and during the scenes that couldn't be cut, subtitles were displayed during broadcast asking for understanding.

=== Changes in writing ===
Initially, Ji Sung's character Jung-won was planned to die in the story, but as the show's scale increased, its plot became uncertain. Actors approached screenwriter Choi Wan-gyu mid-production to explain why their character had to die. Choi said to Maeil Business Newspaper, "All of [the actors] are very good at analyzing the drama, and their advice is very helpful. That's why I'm more worried about how to end it." In the end, Choi decided that none of the main characters would die, stating that death was unnecessary for an emotional story.

Additionally, Song Hye-kyo's character Su-yeon was meant to marry Jung-won, thinking Lee Byung-hun's character In-ha had died. Viewers expressed dissatisfaction with the storyline online, and it was later dropped to create tension within the narrative.

== Music ==
All In Original Soundtrack

Soundtrack album by Various Artists
- Released: January 2003
- Genre: Soundtrack
- Label: Yeon Young Entertainment
- Producer: Kim Hyeong-seok

The soundtrack album for All In was officially released in January 2003. Produced by Kim Hyeong-seok, the soundtrack sold 53,892 copies in February and was the 18th best-selling Korean album of 2003. "Like the First Day", the drama's theme song, became a popular ringtone, racking up over 900,000 downloads on caller ring services by March. The identity of its singer, formally named Who, drew curiosity as he had not made any public appearances; it was later revealed that actor Park Yong-ha was behind the song.

No.	Title	Artist	Length
1.	"All In Theme"	Kim Hyeong-seok	1:48
2.	"Orgol"	Kim Hyeong-seok	0:54
3.	"처음 그 날처럼"	Who (Park Yong-ha)	4:12
4.	"수연 Theme"	Kim Hyeong-seok	1:59
5.	"괜찮아요 난"	Yarz	4:19
6.	"재회"	Kim Hyeong-seok	1:44
7.	"Purple Rain"	Yarz	4:07
8.	"회상"	Kim Hyeong-seok	2:05
9.	"Love Theme"	Kim Hyeong-seok	3:17
10.	"처음이 마지막처럼"	Yarz	4:38
11.	"All In (Piano)"	Kim Hyeong-seok	1:54
12.	"언젠가"	Kim Hyun-sung	4:12
13.	"설레임"	Kim Hyeong-seok	2:05
14.	"그리움에 잠이 듬..."	Kim Hyeong-seok	2:06
15.	"Visions"	Cliff Richard	3:00
16.	"Run (Rock #1)"	Kim Hyeong-seok	1:48
17.	"Fight (Rock #2)"	Kim Hyeong-seok	0:53
18.	"感의 법칙"	Yarz	3:33

== Reception ==
=== Critical response ===
Though All In was a ratings and marketing success, it was also subject to criticisms that it glorified gambling. Journalist Jeon Yeo-ok wrote that while the drama was "worth seeing", its provocative subject matter and excessive violence was not fit for public TV. This concern was echoed by a writer for the South Korean newspaper Kukmin Ilbo, who criticized the series as showing a romanticized portrayal of gambling and asserted that it had "everything that shouldn't be seen on TV".

=== Viewership ===
All In achieved a 21.7% rating in its first week of broadcast, and by its 3rd episode, ratings exceeded to over 30%. By its final episode, it had held the top spot in weekly TV ratings for 7 weeks. With an average rating of 39.6%, it was the highest rated Korean program in March 2003, and was the second highest rated Korean TV program in 2003. Its top rating of 47.7% gave it the 10th highest peak of any series aired between 2000 and 2008, and it was the 4th highest rated SBS drama as of 2012. All In also set records for video-on-demand, breaking Successful Story of a Bright Girl's record of 700,000 downloads with over 1.1 million VOD views.

=== Commercial impact ===
Various spots in Jeju, where most of All In was filmed, became highly-visited tourist attractions upon the show's airing. Over 6,000 visitors came to Seopjikoji during the samiljeol holiday of 2003, and in April that year the series' cast members and staff became PR ambassadors for Jeju Island. Lotte Hotel Jeju, where many of the drama's scenes were filmed, also began selling an "All In Package" where tourists could "experience the vivid emotions of the drama". It was reported in 2006 that the drama had earned Jeju 176.4 billion won due to its "advertising effect". Products featured in the series, such as music boxes with which the main characters express their love, were sold to commercial success, reportedly selling 1,000 copies per day. Forms of gambling also saw an increase after the drama's broadcast; poker games on sites such as Hangame and Hanafos saw an increase in players, and customer traffic to the casino Kangwon Land was said to have increased by 10% since the drama's airing.

=== Accolades ===
All In won the television grand prize at the 39th Baeksang Arts Awards, as well as a Best Actor award for Lee Byung-hun. It was also named the best drama at the 30th Korea Broadcasting Awards, and was one of the Best Picture winners at the 16th Grimae Awards. At the 2003 SBS Drama Awards, Lee Byung-hun won the Grand Prize for his performance in the series. Song Hye-kyo, Ji Sung, and Heo Joon-ho won the Best Actress, Best Actor in a Drama Special, and Best Supporting award respectively, and Lee Byung-hun and Song Hye-kyo also received the Top 10 Stars award at the ceremony.

== Regional broadcast ==
In April 2003, SBS signed a contract with the Taiwanese cable channel Gala Television to broadcast All In in Taiwan. Although the export price was not disclosed, it was said to be the highest for a Korean drama until then. At the time, the record export price had stood at over 400 million won for the Japanese export of Winter Sonata.

In Japan, it first aired on the cable channel KNTV from 8 March to 25 May 2003. Japanese satellite channel NHK BS2 broadcast All In under the title All In: Unmei no Ai (オールイン 運命の愛) once a week from 1 April 2004, and re-airings followed once a week on terrestrial TV starting 16 April 2005. In the Philippines, the drama was aired on GMA-QTV on the network's air launch on November 11, 2005 because of Song Hye-kyo's popularity thru GMA. According to a poll conducted by the TV Asahi variety show SMAP Station in May 2007, All In ranked as the seventh most popular Korean drama in Japan. It was also broadcast in countries like Macedonia and Turkey on the channel Arirang TV, gaining enough popularity in Macedonia to be rebroadcast. In Vietnam, it was broadcast on the channel HTV9.

== See also ==
- List of South Korean television series
- Culture of South Korea
