= The Harmonium in My Memory =

- Theatrical release poster
- Hangul: 내 마음의 풍금
- Hanja: 내 마음의 風琴
- RR: Nae maeumui punggeum
- MR: Nae maŭmŭi p'unggŭm
- Directed by: Lee Young-jae
- Written by: Lee Young-jae
- Based on: Female Student by Ha Keum-chan
- Produced by: Seo Hyun-seok
- Starring: Lee Byung-hun; Jeon Do-yeon; Lee Mi-yeon
- Cinematography: Jeon Jo-myeong
- Edited by: Kyung Min-ho
- Music by: Cho Dong-ik
- Production company: Art Hill
- Release date: 27 March 1999
- Running time: 116 minutes
- Country: South Korea
- Language: Korean

The Harmonium in My Memory (Korean: 내 마음의 풍금; RR: Nae maeumui punggeum) is a 1999 South Korean romantic drama film based on the best-selling Korean semi-autobiographical novel Female Student by Ha Keum-chan.

== Plot ==
In 1962, South Korea. Kang Soo-ha, a 21-year-old teacher from Seoul, takes his first job at a village school in Gangwon Province. One of his older students, 17-year-old Yun Hong-yeon, develops a crush on him, though her efforts to catch his attention seem to go unnoticed. Meanwhile, Soo-ha has fallen for Yang Eun-hee, a fellow teacher at their school.

== Cast ==
- Lee Byung-hun as Kang Soo-ha
- Jeon Do-yeon as Yun Hong-yeon
- Lee Mi-yeon as Yang Eun-hee
- Jeon Moo-song
- Choi Joo-bong
- Lee In-cheol
- Song Ok-sook
- Kim Seon-hwa
- Lee Dae-yeon
- Shin Shin-ae as Sangju-daek

== Release ==
The Harmonium in My Memory was released in South Korea on March 27, 1999.

== Awards ==
Jeon Do-yeon won Best Actress at the 1999 Blue Dragon Film Awards, 1999 Director's Cut Awards, and 2000 Grand Bell Awards for her performance.

The film won Best Picture at the 2000 Verona Love Screens Film Festival.

== Musical theatre ==
The film was adapted into a musical Organ in My Memory (also known as Organ in My Heart) in 2008, which focused on reviving the romantic atmosphere and literary sensitivity of the 1960s on stage as the film did. "The original novel was published in 1980s and the film was made in 1990s and now the musical rendition will be made in 2000s, showing the tireless energy of the work because of its pure and touching story," a public relations official of the production company Show Tic Communications, said. The musical featured visually catching pink-toned stage sets to exude a romantic atmosphere, along with modern music and choreography played by 21 actors to curry favor with the modern audience. The initial run at Hoam Arts Hall (July 22 to September 11, 2008) also drew attention from the public for the return of musical theater-turned-TV/film actor Oh Man-seok to the stage.

At the 2008 Korea Musical Awards, it swept Best Original Korean Musical, Best Direction (Cho Gwang-hwa), Best Composition, Best Scenario, Best Stage Design and Best New Actor (Jo Jung-suk - Oh's alternate for the lead role).

The musical had a second run on July 16 to August 28, 2011 at Hoam Arts Hall in Sunhwa-dong, central Seoul. Oh Man-seok, the star of the first run, returned this time as the director. Oh cast singer Tim and musical actor Kim Seung-dae to take over the lead role.
