= Lee Byung-hun =

South Korean actor (born 1970)

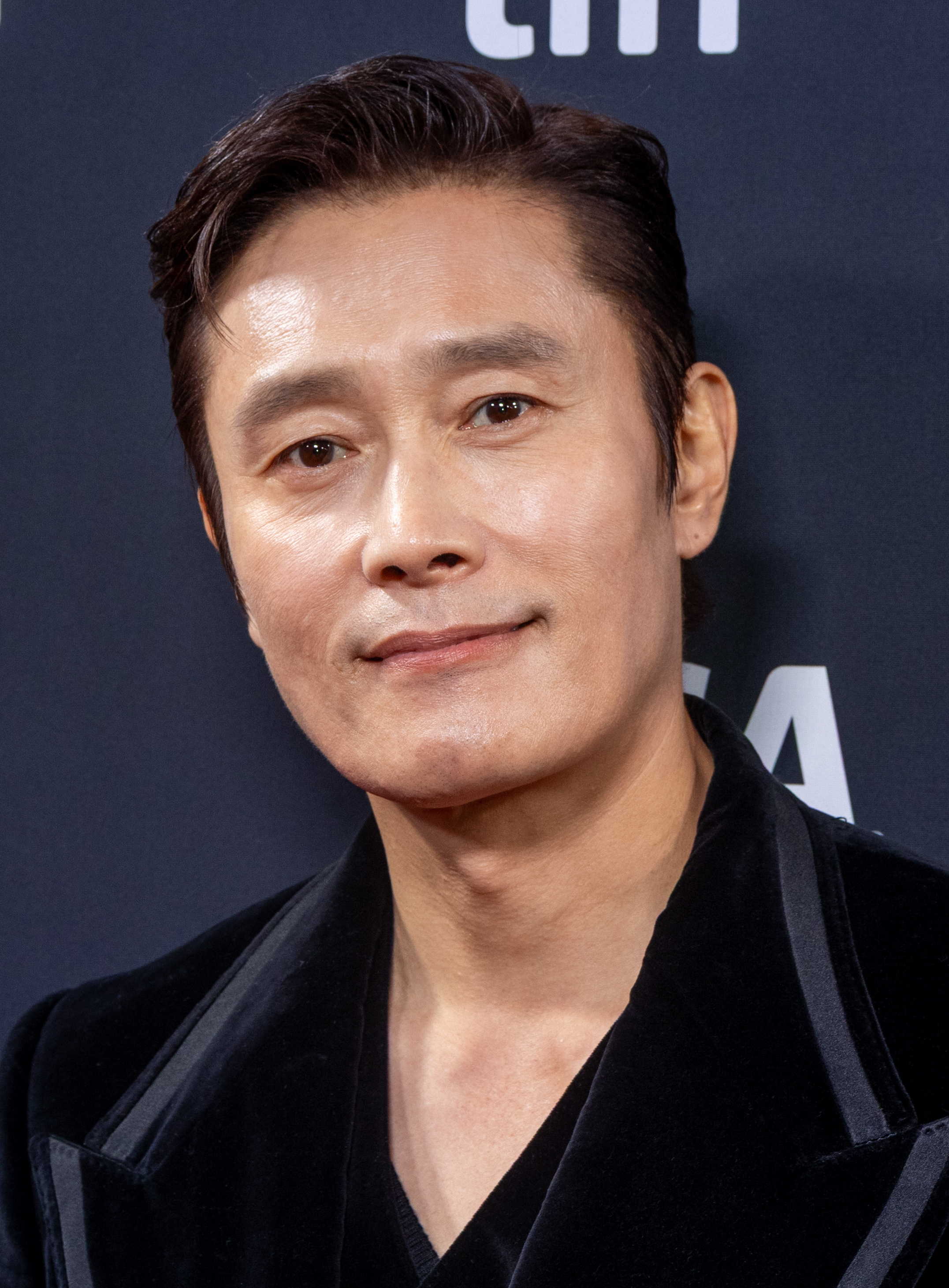
- Lee in 2025
- Born: July 12, 1970 (age 56); Seoul, South Korea
- Education: Hanyang University (French literature); Chung-Ang University
- Occupation: Actor
- Years active: 1991–present
- Agents: United Talent Agency; BH Entertainment (Kakao M)
- Works: Full list
- Spouse: Lee Min-jung (m. 2013)
- Children: 2
- Awards: Full list
- Honours: Bo-gwan Order of Cultural Merit (2025)

Korean name
- Hangul: 이병헌
- Hanja: 李炳憲
- RR: I Byeongheon
- MR: I Pyŏnghŏn

Signature
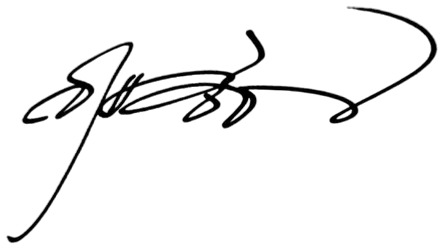

Lee Byung-hun (Korean: 이병헌; born July 12, 1970) is a South Korean actor. He has received acclaim for his work in a wide range of genres, most notably Joint Security Area (2000); A Bittersweet Life (2005); The Good, the Bad, the Weird (2008); I Saw the Devil (2010); Masquerade (2012); and the television series All In (2003), Iris (2009), Mr. Sunshine (2018), Our Blues (2022), and Squid Game (2021–2025). His other notable South Korean films include Inside Men (2015), Master (2016), Ashfall (2019), The Man Standing Next (2020), and No Other Choice (2025), for which he was nominated for a Golden Globe.

In the United States, he is known for portraying Storm Shadow in G.I. Joe: The Rise of Cobra (2009) and its sequel G.I. Joe: Retaliation (2013), and starring alongside Bruce Willis in Red 2 (2013). He portrayed T-1000 in Terminator Genisys (2015), Billy Rocks in The Magnificent Seven (2016) and voiced Gwi-Ma in KPop Demon Hunters (2025). He appeared in a recurring role as the Front Man in season 1 and as part of the main cast of seasons 2 and 3 of the Netflix hit survival series Squid Game (2021–2025).

Lee has been named Gallup Korea's Film Actor of the Year in 2012 and Gallup Korea's Television Actor of the Year in 2018. He was also the first South Korean actor to present an Oscar at the annual Academy Awards in Los Angeles and is a member of the Academy of Motion Picture Arts and Sciences. Lee and Ahn Sung-ki were the first South Korean actors to imprint their hand and foot prints on the forecourt of Grauman's Chinese Theatre in Hollywood, Los Angeles.

== Early life and education ==
Lee was born in Seoul, South Korea. He has a younger sister, Lee Eun-hee, who won the Miss Korea in 1996. He graduated from Hanyang University with a major in French Literature and the Graduate School of Chung-Ang University with a major in Theater and Cinematography.

== Career ==
=== 1991–2000: Beginnings and breakthrough ===
Lee's career began in 1991 after a KBS talent audition and making his debut in the television drama Asphalt My Hometown. Lee drew attention with the action drama Asphalt Man and romantic film The Harmonium in My Memory, but it was only in 2000 that he made his big breakthrough with Park Chan-wook's Joint Security Area. The film broke the box office record and became the highest grossing Korean film at the time. Lee's role as a border-guard soldier won him the Best Actor award at the Busan Film Critics Awards.

=== 2001–2009: Stardom ===
In 2001, Lee's popularity continued to climb when he starred in melodramas Beautiful Days and Bungee Jumping of Their Own. In 2003, he received the Grand Prize at the SBS Drama Awards and Best Actor at the Baeksang Arts Awards for his role in the poker drama All In. Due to his film and television roles, Lee experienced a rise in popularity across Asia, particularly Japan.

From 2005, Lee focused on film, earning praise for his performance in A Bittersweet Life directed by Kim Jee-woon, which was screened out of competition at the Cannes Film Festival. Lee was nominated for Best Actor at the Blue Dragon Film Awards and Grand Bell Awards, and won at the Chunsa Film Art Awards, Baeksang Arts Awards and the Korean Association of Film Critics Awards.

Lee reunited with director Kim Jee-woon in the "kimchi western" The Good, the Bad, the Weird, taking on his first villain role. The film was screened out of competition at the Cannes Film Festival. Lee's eye-catching performance in the film led to increased global recognition for him. This led to Lee's debut in Hollywood, where he played Storm Shadow in G.I. Joe: The Rise of Cobra, also starring Channing Tatum and Sienna Miller.

Back in Korea, Lee appeared in I Come with the Rain opposite American actor Josh Hartnett and Japanese actor Takuya Kimura.

Lee returned to television in late 2009 in the espionage action thriller Iris as a secret agent who finds himself at the center of an international conspiracy. He reportedly received over 100 million won per episode for his role, the third highest in the country's drama history. Iris was one of the most expensive shows ever produced, and was a smash hit across Asia. Lee's performance earned him the Grand Prize at the KBS Drama Awards and Best Actor at the Baeksang Arts Awards.

=== 2010–2017: Acclaim and Hollywood roles ===
In 2010, Lee starred in I Saw the Devil with Choi Min-sik, his third collaboration with Kim Jee-woon, which premiered at the Sundance Film Festival. His portrayal of the intelligence agent won him the Grand Prize at the Baeksang Arts Awards.

Lee was praised for his portrayal of dual roles in the lavish period drama Masquerade. The film was a box office hit, becoming the 7th film in Korean history to surpass 10 million admissions. Lee won Best Actor at the Grand Bell Awards for his performance. On June 23, 2012, Lee, along with Ahn Sung-ki, became the first Korean actors to leave their hand and foot prints on the forecourt of Grauman's Chinese Theatre in Hollywood, Los Angeles. He was recognized as an emerging star in Hollywood for his role of Storm Shadow in G.I. Joe: The Rise of Cobra, and its sequel, G.I. Joe: Retaliation.

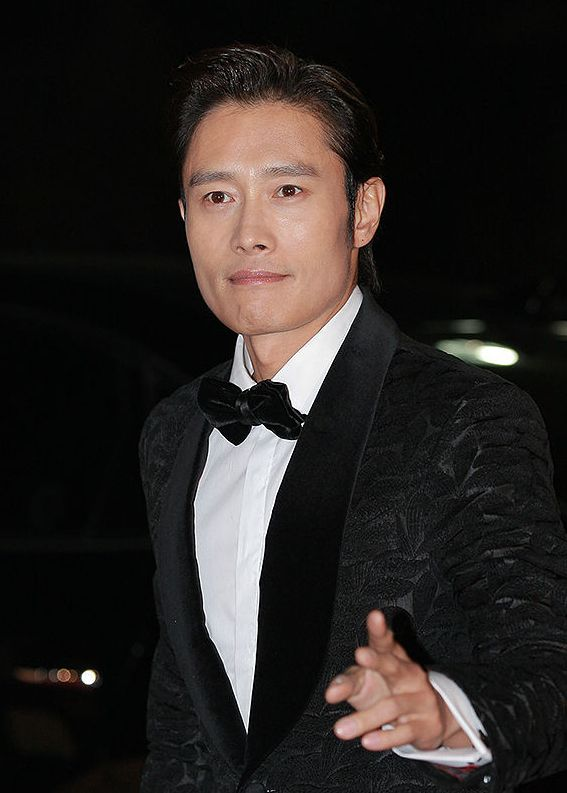
Lee in 2013

In 2013, Lee reprised his role as Storm Shadow in G.I. Joe: Retaliation. He then co-starred in the American film Red 2, the sequel to the 2010 action-comedy hit Red, alongside Bruce Willis, Catherine Zeta-Jones, Helen Mirren and John Malkovich.

Following his sex-chat scandal, Lee returned with the martial arts film Memories of the Sword in 2015. The film was shot in late 2013 and scheduled for release in 2014, but was postponed due to Lee's scandal. He received praise for his "scene-stealing" role as a young and ambitious warrior with a lowly status, but the film failed to do well and was criticized for its plot. The same year, Lee played a T-1000 in Terminator Genisys opposite Arnold Schwarzenegger. He then starred in Woo Min-ho's political crime thriller Inside Men, which became the top grossing R-rated movie of all-time at the Korean Box Office. Touted as the "star" of the film, Lee won Best Actor awards at various film awards ceremonies.

In 2016, Lee featured in the American crime thriller Misconduct. On February 28, 2016, Lee attended the 88th Academy Awards and presented the Best Foreign Language Film award with actress Sofia Vergara. He was the first Korean actor to present an award at the Oscars. The same year, Lee co-starred as knife-wielding gunslinger Billy Rocks in The Magnificent Seven with Denzel Washington, Chris Pratt, and Ethan Hawke.

Returning to Korea, Lee starred in the crime thriller Master, followed by mystery drama Single Rider.

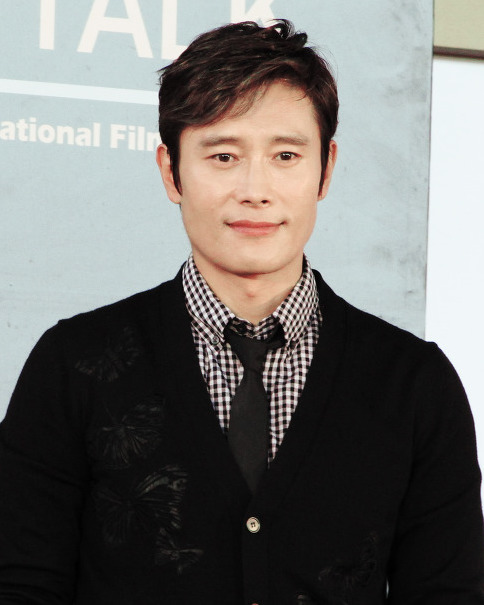
Lee in 2016

In March 2017, Lee signed with major Hollywood agency United Talent Agency. He was cast in the Hollywood action film Radiance. The film is directed by Patrick Lussier, who worked with Lee in Terminator Genisys. Lee then starred in historical epic The Fortress, and comedy-drama film Keys to the Heart.

=== 2018–present: Return to television and continued success ===
In 2018, Lee made his television comeback in Mr. Sunshine, a historical war drama written by Kim Eun-sook. The series was a commercial and critical success, and Lee won the Grand Prize at the 6th APAN Star Awards.

In 2019, Lee starred in the action film Ashfall. In 2020, Lee starred in the political drama The Man Standing Next. Both films were box office successes, and proved Lee's brand power as a lead actor. Lee also starred in the political thriller aviation disaster film Emergency Declaration, which premiered out of competition at the 74th Cannes Film Festival in July 2021 before its theatrical release in South Korea on August 3, 2022.

In September 2021, he appeared on the first season of Netflix's survival drama Squid Game as the Front Man. At the 15th Asian Film Awards, he was awarded with Asian Film Excellence Award. He is the first Korean actor to be selected for the award, which is given for outstanding achievements in Asian cinema and culture. He reprised his role as the Front Man in the second season, released in December 2024, and later its third and final season, released in June 2025.

In 2022, Lee starred in the tvN television series Our Blues written by Noh Hee-kyung.

In 2023, Lee appeared in Um Tae-hwa's disaster thriller film Concrete Utopia alongside Park Bo-young and Park Seo-joon. On September 14, 2023, he was one of the guest speakers chosen to introduce rock star Yoshiki at his imprint ceremony at the TCL Chinese Theatre.

In 2025, Lee was the star of 29th edition of Bucheon International Fantastic Film Festival's Actor Special Exhibition held from July 3 to 17. He also hosted the opening ceremony of 30th Busan International Film Festival. Lee also starred in Park Chan-wook's black comedy thriller No Other Choice, which premiered in competition at the 82nd Venice International Film Festival. For his performance, he was nominated for the Golden Globe Award for Best Actor in a Motion Picture – Musical or Comedy.

== Other work ==
Lee formed a management company, BH Entertainment, which manages many actors including Han Hyo-joo, Go Soo, Jin Goo, Jinyoung and Han Ji-min. He owns a shop, BHNC, which sells hats, scarves and wallets.

Lee is noted in the video game industry for providing his likeness for the main character Wayne Holden, in the 2006 game Lost Planet: Extreme Condition, for the Xbox 360, PS3, and PC.

=== Ambassadorship ===
In 2010, Lee was named California's tourism promotion ambassador to Korea.

In 2013, Lee was selected as an honorary ambassador for that year's annual meeting of the Association of Film Commissioners International, a group dedicated to helping facilitate international coproductions. The same year, he was appointed honorary ambassador to promote the 50th Grand Bell Awards.

=== Philanthropy ===
In March 2011, Lee donated 700 million won to the Korean Red Cross to help local residents affected by the earthquake and tsunami in Japan.

In November 2016, Lee made a voice donation to Green Umbrella Children's Foundation for 'Haru', a campaign to support sick children.

In April 2019, Lee and his wife Lee Min-jung donated 100 million to victims of forest fires in Gangwon-do.

In February 2020, Lee donated 100 million won through the Fruit of Love of the Community Chest of Korea and his donation was used to provide sanitary products to vulnerable groups. In October 2020, Lee made voice donation to multi-media type Braille sensory book by The National Research Institute of Cultural Heritage. On December 30, 2020, Lee donated 100 million won to the Green Umbrella Children's Foundation to help children from low-income families who are having difficulties in life due to COVID-19.

On July 12, 2021, Lee donated 100 million won to Asan Children's Hospital in Seoul on his birthday.

On March 6, 2022, Lee donated 100 million won to Hope Bridge Disaster Relief Association to help residents affected by the Uljin and Samcheok wildfires and his donation is said to be quickly used to provide temporary shelter for the victims who are evacuating from their homes.

On May 5, 2023, he donated ₩100 million (approximately US$68,000) to support pediatric and adolescent patients in celebration of Children's Day. The donation was intended to assist with medical treatment and related support for young patients.

== Personal life ==
In his spare time, Lee practices taekwondo.

=== Relationships ===
Lee was previously romantically linked with fellow All In lead Song Hye-kyo beginning in the early-2000s. The relationship, though kept completely low-key and rarely publicized, lasted fifteen months before they split in mid-June 2004. Lee married actress Lee Min-jung on August 10, 2013, at the Grand Hyatt Seoul. The couple had briefly dated in 2006, then resumed their relationship in 2012. Lee's wife gave birth to their child, a son, Lee Joon-hoo, on March 31, 2015. On August 4, 2023, Lee's wife confirmed that she was expecting their second child. They welcomed the birth of their second child, a daughter, born on December 21, 2023.

After he had to clear some debts following his father's death, Lee fell into a depression. He then started to suffer panic disorders, and found it difficult to attend award ceremonies. Lee credits his wife with helping him overcome his mental health challenges.

=== Civil lawsuit and habitual gambling allegations ===
On December 9, 2009, Lee's ex-girlfriend Kwon Mi-yeon filed a civil lawsuit alleging she was tricked into having a sexual relationship with the star based on the promise of marriage. She claimed Lee caused her mental anguish and physical damage along with claims that Lee is a chronic gambler and sued for 100 million won ($75,000 to $80,000 in 2009, depending on the fluctuating exchange rate). Lee's agency, BH Entertainment, countered that her claims were all false and that the lawsuit was retaliatory in nature due to the breakup. Lee countersued Kwon for defamation and extortion.

Shortly after the lawsuit was filed, TV show host Kang Byung-kyu appeared on the set of the TV drama Iris that Lee was working on at the time. He was accused of bringing in gangsters and causing a disturbance due to a conflict with a producer that he claimed spread rumors that Kang was behind the feud between Lee and Kwon. Due to this incident, Kang was arrested on assault charges. Kang was also later indicted on charges of blackmail and defamation, with prosecutors alleging that Kang and Kwon colluded to blackmail Lee for large sums of money in November 2009, before Kwon went on to file her civil lawsuit in December, after Lee refused to pay.

Lee was cleared of the illegal gambling charges on March 19, 2010, with prosecutors citing no evidence. Kwon's claim for damages was eventually dropped in August 2010 due to her lack of participation in proceedings. Kang was eventually sentenced to one year in prison and three years probation in 2013 on his fraud and assault charges.

=== Blackmail scandal ===
On August 28, 2014, Lee was blackmailed by singer Dahee from K-pop girl group Glam and model Lee Ji-yeon for 5 billion won (about US$4,000,000) in exchange for not releasing on the internet a compromising video of him making sexual jokes while drinking with them on July 3. Dahee and Lee Ji-yeon were arrested on September 1, after the actor reported the crime to police when they handed him two suitcases to fill with the money. It was later revealed that the crime was intentional and preplanned, as both Dahee and Lee Ji-yeon looked for plane tickets to escape to Europe and purchased two suitcases to be used for transporting the money. Moreover, the two women attempted to film an additional video of Lee Byung-hun hugging Lee Ji-yeon by secretly placing a smartphone in a kitchen sink, but they failed to do so. However, Lee Ji-yeon claimed that the blackmailing was an impulsive act after Lee broke up with her, for which Lee's agency released an official statement, stating that Lee had not once met her alone and that he mentioned to the two women that he wanted to stop meeting them when he sensed ulterior motives from them, after talking about their financial difficulties, demanding he buy them a house. The final trial was held at the Seoul District Court on January 15, 2015, where Dahee was sentenced to a year in jail and Lee Ji-yeon a year and two months. In February, following the sentencing, Lee Byung-hun requested a pardon for the women, while the prosecutors in charge felt that the sentence was too lenient. In March, both women, who were in jail for six months, received a suspended sentence for two years, following Lee's pardon request. Glam was disbanded following the sentencing of Dahee.

=== Tax audit ===
Lee and BH Entertainment underwent a non-regular National Tax Service audit in September 2022. When that became public in February 2023, BH confirmed an additional levy of an unspecified sum and said it was not for tax evasion. The agency said Lee had had no tax incident in 30 years. It attributed the extra tax to the timing of advertising-fee deposits and to bonuses he paid staff from his own money that had been booked as company costs; some reports also cited an accounting error on a planned COVID-19 donation from 2020 advertising fees. BH said the amount had been paid and that a reported building sale was unrelated to the audit.

== Discography ==
=== Albums ===
| Year | Title |
|---|---|
| 1999 | Lee Byung Hun - To Me |

=== Singles ===
| Year | Title |
|---|---|
| 2008 | "Itsuka (Someday)" |

=== Soundtrack appearances ===
| Year | Title | Album |
|---|---|---|
| 2010 | "Stay" | Iris OST |
| 2010 | "Endless Road" | Iris OST |
