= Baeksang Arts Award for Most Popular Actor =

South Korean annual award

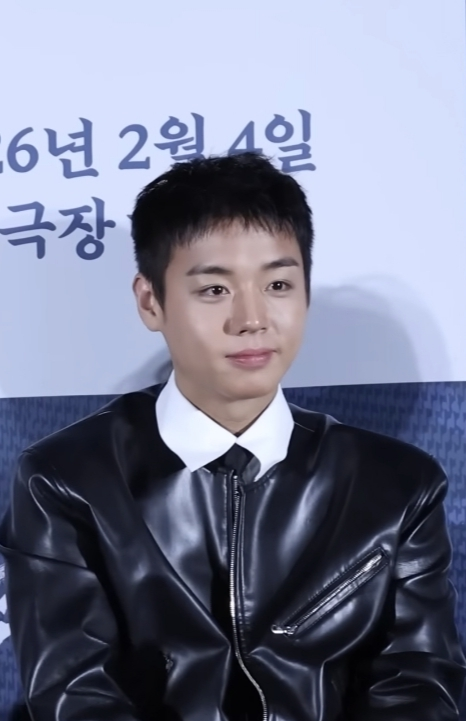
- 2026 recipient: Park Ji-hoon
- Awarded for: Most voted actor in the popularity poll
- Country: South Korea
- Presented by: Baeksang Arts Awards
- Most recent winner: Park Ji-hoon (2026)
- Website: baeksangartsawards

The Baeksang Arts Awards for Most Popular Actor (Korean: 백상예술대상 인기상; RR: Baeksang Yesul Daesang Ingisang) is an award presented annually at the Baeksang Arts Awards ceremony organised by Ilgan Sports and JTBC Plus, affiliates of JoongAng Ilbo, usually in the second quarter of each year in Seoul.

Before 2018, the winners were announced in both film and television categories. The award is voted by the public and all male acting nominees from film and television categories are eligible. TikTok held the naming rights for this award from 2020 to 2023.

== List of winners ==
=== 1985–2017 ===
#	Year	Film		Television	
#	Year	Recipient	Work	Recipient	Work
21	1985	Not awarded		Jeong Jin	The Ume Tree in the Midst of the Snow
21	1985	Not awarded		Byun Hee-bong	The Ume Tree in the Midst of the Snow
21	1985	Not awarded		Lee Deok-hwa	Love and Truth
22	1986	Not awarded		Yu In-chon	First Love
23	1987	Ahn Sung-ki	Moonlight Hunter		
23	1987	Ahn Sung-ki	Moonlight Hunter	Kil Yong-woo	Samogok
23	1987	Ahn Sung-ki	Moonlight Hunter	Lee Deok-hwa	Love and Ambition
24	1988	Yu In-chon	Diary of King Yeonsan	Jung Han-yong	Door of Desire
24	1988	Yu In-chon	Diary of King Yeonsan	Nam Sung-hoon	Love and Ambition
25	1989	Lee Young-ha	Honeymoon	Im Hyun-sik	Three Families Under One Roof
25	1989	Lee Young-ha	Honeymoon	Park Geun-hyung	Sandcastle
26	1990	Son Chang-min	All That Falls Has Wings	Kim Soon-cheol	—N/a
26	1990	Son Chang-min	All That Falls Has Wings	Yu In-chon	—N/a
27	1991	Choi Soo-jong	Well, It's A Secret	Jung Han-yong	—N/a
27	1991	Choi Soo-jong	Well, It's A Secret	Joo Hyun	—N/a
28	1992	Lee Deok-hwa	Fly High Run Far	Park Sang-won	Eyes of Dawn
28	1992	Lee Deok-hwa	Fly High Run Far	Choi Min-soo	What Is Love
29	1993	Park Yeong-gyu	The Emperor of Romance	Yu In-chon	Ilchulbong
29	1993	Park Yeong-gyu	The Emperor of Romance	Baek Il-seob	Sons and Daughters
30	1994	Lee Geung-young	That Woman, That Man	Choi Soo-jong	Sons and Daughters
31	1995	Dokgo Young-jae	Life and Death of the Hollywood Kid	Cha In-pyo	Love Is In Your Embrace
31	1995	Park Sang-min	Affliction Of Man	Lee Charm	Daughter
32	1996	Park Joong-hoon	Millions in My Account	Jeong Jong-jun	Aunt Jade
32	1996	Park Joong-hoon	Millions in My Account	Park Yong-sik	Even If the Wind Blows
33	1997	Lee Jung-jae	Firebird	Bae Yong-joon	First Love
33	1997	Lee Jung-jae	Firebird	Jang Dong-gun	Medical Brothers
34	1998	Park Shin-yang	The Letter	Cha In-pyo	You and I
34	1998	Park Shin-yang	The Letter	Song Seung-heon	You and I
35	1999	Lee Jung-jae	City of the Rising Sun	Ryu Si-won	Paper Crane
36	2000	Lee Sung-jae	Attack the Gas Station	Yoo Dong-geun	You Don't Know My Mind
36	2000	Lee Sung-jae	Attack the Gas Station	Jun Kwang-ryul	Hur Jun
37	2001	Song Kang-ho	—N/a	Kang Seok-woo	—N/a
38	2002	Yoo Oh-sung	—N/a	Yoon Tae-young	—N/a
38	2002	Yoo Oh-sung	—N/a	Bae Yong-joon	—N/a
39	2003	Im Chang-jung	Sex Is Zero	Ahn Jae-mo	—N/a
39	2003	Im Chang-jung	Sex Is Zero	Yoon Tae-young	—N/a
40	2004	Kang Dong-won	Too Beautiful to Lie	Rain	Sang Doo! Let's Go to School
40	2004	Kwon Sang-woo	Once Upon a Time in High School	So Ji-sub	What Happened in Bali
41	2005	Kang Dong-won	Duelist	Zo In-sung	Spring Days
41	2005	Kim Rae-won	My Little Bride	Eric Mun	Super Rookie
41	2005	Lee Dong-gun	My Boyfriend Is Type B		
42	2006	Hyun Bin	A Millionaire's First Love	Jo Hyun-jae	Ballad of Seodong
43	2007	Lee Joon-gi	Fly, Daddy, Fly	Lee Beom-soo	Surgeon Bong Dal-hee
44	2008	Kwon Sang-woo	Fate	Kang Ji-hwan	Hong Gil-dong
45	2009	Ju Ji-hoon	Antique	Kim Hyun-joong	Boys Over Flowers
46	2010	Jang Keun-suk	The Case of Itaewon Homicide	Lee Seung-gi	Brilliant Legacy
47	2011	Choi Seung-hyun	71: Into the Fire	Park Yoo-chun	Sungkyunkwan Scandal
48	2012	Jang Keun-suk	You're My Pet	Park Yoo-chun	Miss Ripley
49	2013	Kim Dong-wan	Deranged	Park Yoo-chun	Missing You
50	2014	Kim Soo-hyun	Secretly, Greatly	Kim Soo-hyun	My Love from the Star
51	2015	Lee Min-ho	Gangnam Blues	Lee Jong-suk	Pinocchio
52	2016	Doh Kyung-soo	Pure Love	Song Joong-ki	Descendants of the Sun
53	2017	Doh Kyung-soo	My Annoying Brother	Park Bo-gum	Love in the Moonlight

=== 2018–present ===
#	Year	Awardee
54	2018	Jung Hae-in
55	2019	Doh Kyung-soo
56	2020	Hyun Bin
57	2021	Kim Seon-ho
58	2022	Lee Jun-ho
59	2023	Park Jin-young
60	2024	Kim Soo-hyun
61	2025	Byeon Woo-seok
62	2026	Park Ji-hoon

== Sources ==
- "Baeksang Arts Awards Nominees and Winners Lists". Naver Movie (in Korean).
- "Baeksang Arts Awards Winners Lists". Baeksang Arts Awards (in Korean).
