= List of awards and nominations received by Lee Min-ho =

Lee Min-ho awards and nominations
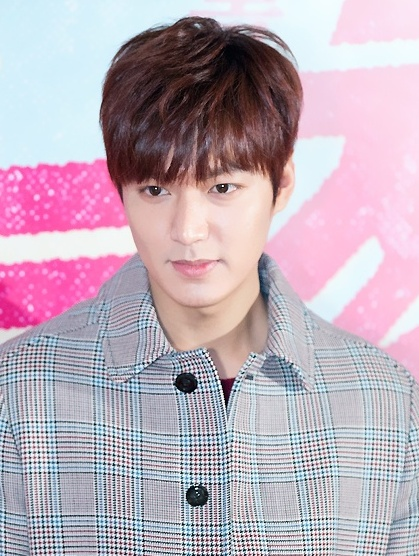
- Lee in 2014
Awards and nominations
Award	Wins	Nominations
APAN Star Awards	0	2
Asian Television Award	0	1
Baeksang Arts Awards	3	4
Baidu Feidian Awards	1	1
Blue Dragon Film Awards	1	3
Bucheon International Fantastic Film Festival	1	1
China Fashion Awards	1	1
Fashionista Awards	0	1
Fundex Awards	1	1
Grand Bell Awards	1	2
Gold Derby Awards	2	2
Independent Spirit Awards	1	1
KBS Drama Awards	2	3
Korea Brand Stars	1	1
Korea Drama Awards	2	3
Korea SNS Industry Grand Award	1	1
Korean Association of Film Critics Awards	0	1
Korean Tourism Awards	1	1
LeTV Awards	1	1
Max Movie Awards	0	1
MBC Drama Awards	1	3
Mnet 20's Choice Awards	0	7
MTN Broadcast Advertisement Festival	1	1
SBS Drama Awards	14	19
Seoul International Drama Awards	2	8
Sohu Media Awards	1	1
Soompi Awards	2	2
Style Icon Awards	0	4
Weibo Movie Award	2	2
Yahoo Asia Buzz Awards	0	3

Totals (Note: Certain award groups do not simply award one winner. They acknowledge several different recipients, have runners-up, and have third place. Since this is a specific recognition and is different from losing an award, runner-up mentions are considered wins in this award tally. For simplification and to avoid errors, each award in this list has been presumed to have had a prior nomination.)
- Wins: 43
- Nominations: 82

This is a list of awards and nominations received by South Korean actor Lee Min-ho. Lee is acknowledged for his roles in television dramas Boys Over Flowers (2009), City Hunter (2011), and The King: Eternal Monarch (2020).

== Awards and nominations ==
Name of the award ceremony, year presented, category, work(s) nominated / nominee(s) of the award, and the result of the nomination
Award ceremony	Year	Category	Work(s) / Nominee(s)	Result	Ref.
APAN Star Awards	2014	Top Excellence Award, Actor in a Miniseries	The Heirs	Nominated	
APAN Star Awards	2020	Popular Star Award, Actor	The King: Eternal Monarch	Nominated	
Asian Television Award	2009	Best Drama Actor	Boys Over Flowers	Nominated	
Baeksang Arts Awards	2009	Best New Actor – Television	Boys Over Flowers	Won	
Baeksang Arts Awards	2015	Best New Actor – Film	Gangnam Blues	Nominated	
Baeksang Arts Awards	2015	Most Popular Actor – Film	Gangnam Blues	Won	
Baeksang Arts Awards	2015	iQiyi Star Award	Lee Min-ho	Won	
Baidu Feidian Awards	2013	Best Asian Actor	The Heirs	Won	
Blue Dragon Film Awards	2015	Best New Actor	Gangnam Blues	Nominated	
Blue Dragon Film Awards	2015	Popularity Award	Gangnam Blues	Won	
Blue Dragon Film Awards	2026	Best Supporting Actor	The Assassin(s)	Pending	
Bucheon International Fantastic Film Festival	2015	Producer Choice Award	Lee Min-ho	Won	
China Fashion Awards	2013	Most Popular Asian Actor	Lee Min-ho	Won	
Fashionista Awards	2015	Best Fashionista in a Movie	Gangnam Blues	Nominated	
Fundex Awards	2024	Best Actor in an OTT Original Drama	Pachinko Season 2	Won	
Grand Bell Awards	2015	Best New Actor	Gangnam Blues	Won	
Grand Bell Awards	2015	Popularity Award	Gangnam Blues	Nominated	
Gold Derby Awards	2022	Best Drama Actor	Pachinko	Won	
Gold Derby Awards	2022	Breakthrough Performer of the Year	Pachinko	Won	
Independent Spirit Awards	2023	Best Ensemble Cast	Pachinko	Won	
KBS Drama Awards	2009	Best New Actor	Boys Over Flowers	Won	
KBS Drama Awards	2009	Best Couple Award (with Ku Hye-sun)	Boys Over Flowers	Won	
KBS Drama Awards	2009	Netizen Award, Actor	Boys Over Flowers	Nominated	
Korea Brand Stars	2015	Grand Prize (Daesang) (Note: A Daesang (Korean: 대상), which translates to "Grand Prize", is the highest honor given out at South Korean award ceremonies.)	Lee Min-ho	Won	
Korea Drama Awards	2011	Top Excellence Award, Actor	City Hunter	Won	
Korea Drama Awards	2011	Hallyu Star Award	City Hunter	Won	
Korea Drama Awards	2014	Grand Prize (Daesang)	The Heirs	Nominated	
Korea SNS Industry Grand Award	2015	President Award of National Information Society Agency	Lee Min-ho	Won	
Korean Association of Film Critics Awards	2015	Best New Actor	Gangnam Blues	Nominated	
Korean Tourism Awards	2015	The STAR of Korean Tourism 2015	Lee Min-ho	Won	
LeTV Awards	2016	Most Popular Asian Actor Award	Lee Min-ho	Won	
Max Movie Awards	2016	Best New Actor	Gangnam Blues	Nominated	
MBC Drama Awards	2010	Excellence Award, Actor	Personal Taste	Won	
MBC Drama Awards	2010	Popularity Award, Actor	Personal Taste	Nominated	
MBC Drama Awards	2010	Best Couple Award with Son Ye-jin	Personal Taste	Nominated	
Mnet 20's Choice Awards	2009	Hot Male Drama Star	Boys Over Flowers	Nominated	
Mnet 20's Choice Awards	2009	Hot Character ("Gu Jun-pyo")	Boys Over Flowers	Nominated	
Mnet 20's Choice Awards	2009	Hot CF Star	Dunkin' Donuts	Nominated	
Mnet 20's Choice Awards	2009	Hot New Star	Lee Min-ho	Nominated	
Mnet 20's Choice Awards	2009	Hot Summer Heat Popularity Award	Lee Min-ho	Nominated	
Mnet 20's Choice Awards	2011	Hot Male Drama Star	City Hunter	Nominated	
Mnet 20's Choice Awards	2011	Hot 20's Voice	Lee Min-ho	Nominated	
MTN Broadcast Advertisement Festival	2009	Most Popular Advertisement Model	Trugen Commercial	Won	
SBS Drama Awards	2011	Top Excellence Award, Actor in a Drama Special	City Hunter	Won	
SBS Drama Awards	2011	Popularity Award, Actor	City Hunter	Won	
SBS Drama Awards	2011	Top 10 Stars	City Hunter	Won	
SBS Drama Awards	2011	Best Couple Award with Park Min-young	City Hunter	Nominated	
SBS Drama Awards	2012	Top Excellence Award, Actor in a Miniseries	Faith	Won	
SBS Drama Awards	2012	Top 10 Stars	Faith	Won	
SBS Drama Awards	2012	Popularity Award, Actor	Faith	Nominated	
SBS Drama Awards	2013	Top Excellence Award, Actor in a Drama Special	The Heirs	Won	
SBS Drama Awards	2013	Popularity Award, Actor	The Heirs	Won	
SBS Drama Awards	2013	Top 10 Stars	The Heirs	Won	
SBS Drama Awards	2013	Best Couple Award with Park Shin-hye	The Heirs	Won	
SBS Drama Awards	2013	Best Dressed	The Heirs	Won	
SBS Drama Awards	2016	Grand Prize (Daesang)	The Legend of the Blue Sea	Nominated	
SBS Drama Awards	2016	Top Excellence Award, Actor in a Fantasy Drama	The Legend of the Blue Sea	Won	
SBS Drama Awards	2016	Best Couple (with Jun Ji-hyun)	The Legend of the Blue Sea	Won	
SBS Drama Awards	2016	Top 10 Stars Award	The Legend of the Blue Sea	Won	
SBS Drama Awards	2016	K-Wave Star Award	The Legend of the Blue Sea	Nominated	
SBS Drama Awards	2020	Top Excellence Award, Actor in a Miniseries Fantasy/Romance Drama	The King: Eternal Monarch	Won	
SBS Drama Awards	2020	Best Couple (with Kim Go-eun)	The King: Eternal Monarch	Nominated	
Seoul International Drama Awards	2009	People's Choice Actor	Boys Over Flowers	Nominated	
Seoul International Drama Awards	2012	Outstanding Korean Actor	City Hunter	Nominated	
Seoul International Drama Awards	2012	People's Choice Actor	City Hunter	Nominated	
Seoul International Drama Awards	2013	People's Choice Actor	Faith	Nominated	
Seoul International Drama Awards	2014	Outstanding Korean Actor	The Heirs	Nominated	
Seoul International Drama Awards	2014	People's Choice Actor	The Heirs	Nominated	
Seoul International Drama Awards	2015	10th Anniversary Hallyu Achievement Award	Lee Min-ho	Won	
Seoul International Drama Awards	2015	Mango TV Popularity Award	Lee Min-ho	Won	
Sohu Media Awards	2013	Most Popular International Actor	Lee Min-ho	Won	
Soompi Awards	2017	Actor of the Year	The Legend of the Blue Sea	Won	
Soompi Awards	2017	Spot-on Best Couple (with Jun Ji-hyun)	The Legend of the Blue Sea	Won	
Style Icon Awards	2009	Viewers' Best Popularity Icon	Lee Min-ho	Nominated	
Style Icon Awards	2010	Popularity Award	Lee Min-ho	Nominated	
Style Icon Awards	2011	Top 10 Style Icons	Lee Min-ho	Nominated	
Style Icon Awards	2014	Top 10 Style Icons	Lee Min-ho	Nominated	
Weibo Movie Award	2016	Most Anticipated Action Comedy Actor	Bounty Hunters	Won	
Weibo Movie Award	2016	Asian Movie Pioneer	Bounty Hunters	Won	
Yahoo Asia Buzz Awards	2009	Top Buzz Star: Male Category	Lee Min-ho	Nominated	
Yahoo Asia Buzz Awards	2010	Top Buzz Star: Male Actor	Lee Min-ho	Nominated	
Yahoo Asia Buzz Awards	2010	Top Buzz Star: Male Category	Lee Min-ho	Nominated	

== Other accolades ==
=== State and cultural honors ===
Name of country or organization, year given, and name of honor
Country or organization	Year	Honor	Ref.
Institute of National Brand Promotion (Note: Honors are given at the National Brand Awards, to acknowledge individuals and businesses who make an exceptional contribution to raising South Korea's brand image.)	2017	National Brand Award Grand Prize – Culture Sector	
South Korea (Note: Honors are given at the Korean Popular Culture and Arts Awards, arranged by the Korea Creative Content Agency and hosted by the Ministry of Culture, Sports and Tourism. They are awarded to those who have contributed to the arts and South Korea's pop culture.)	2014	Prime Minister's Commendation	
South Korea	2025	Presidential Commendation	

=== Listicles ===
Name of publisher, year listed, name of listicle, and placement
Publisher	Year	List	Placement	Ref.
Forbes	2010	Korea Power Celebrity 40	18th	
Forbes	2011	Korea Power Celebrity 40	35th	
Forbes	2012	Korea Power Celebrity 40	40th	
Forbes	2014	Korea Power Celebrity 40	21st	
Forbes	2016	Korea Power Celebrity 40	31st	
Forbes	2017	Korea Power Celebrity 40	22nd	
Forbes	2021	Korea Power Celebrity 40	16th	
Forbes	2022	Korea Power Celebrity 40	20th	
Gold House (Note: The A100 List honours the most impactful Asians and Asian American & Pacific Islanders (AAPIs) in culture every May for AAPI Heritage Month. Gold House "champions trailblazing members of the AAPI community and their transformative contributions to entertainment, fashion, lifestyle, technology, business, social activism and politics from the past year".)	2022	A100 List (with Pachinko Creators & Stars)	Included	
Korean Film Council	2021	Korean Actors 200 (Note: Introduces 200 actors that best represent the present and future of Korean cinema to the people in the film industry all over the world.)	Included	
