= M.C the Max =

South Korean rock band

- Also known as: Moon Child
- Origin: Seoul, South Korea
- Genres: Korean Ballad, Power Ballad, Pop rock
- Years active: 2000–present
- Labels: Music&NEW; 325 E&C
- Members: Lee Soo
- Past members: Heo Jung-min: J. Yoon; Jeon Min-hyuk

M.C the Max (Korean: 엠씨 더 맥스) is a South Korean rock band. They debuted in 2000 as a 4-member band under the name Moon Child. After the departure of member Heo Jung-min, members Lee Soo, Jeon Min-hyuk and J. Yoon regrouped in 2002 as M.C the Max.

They were initially managed by the production company of Yoshiki, founding member of the Japanese heavy metal band X Japan. On September 1, 2016, it was reported that M.C the MAX had chosen to form their own music agency, 325 E&C. Their song "Love Poem (사랑의 시)", from their 2nd album, topped the KBS chart in February 2004. To date, they have released 8 full-length albums, several singles, and began participating in soundtrack contributions for several Korean television series as well.

== Career ==
=== 2000–2001: Debut as Moon Child, Delete, 사랑하니까, and Heo Jung-min's departure ===
M.C the MAX originally debuted in May 2000 with the release of their 1st album Delete as a quartet under the name "Moon Child": Lee Soo, J. Yoon, Jeon Min-hyuk and Heo Jung-min. Their 1st album consisted of mainly songs in the techno rock as well as the rock ballad genre.

They released their 2nd album 사랑하니까 (loosely translated to Because of Love) in May 2001. Their 2nd album had a more similar sound to what they do today, consisting mainly of ballads mixed with a rock sound. Their title song "사랑하니까" is a ballad song with some rock sounds mixed in. It was their last album to feature member Heo Jung-min, as he left the band in late 2001 for personal reasons.

=== 2002–2003: Regrouping, rising popularity in Japan, and Love Is Time Sixth Sense ===
Their first two albums was met with limited success and after member Heo Jung-min left the band in 2001, it partially influenced their decision to disband. They then re-grouped as a trio with the remaining members under their current name "M.C the Max". The name change and the decision to regroup could be seen as means to release songs with improved quality than ever before, as well as be 'reborn' under a new identity. They released their first album as a trio with a new band name on October 31, 2002. They steered into music of the ballad genre, while keeping their rock sounds.

They gained popularity in Japan with the support of Yoshiki from the popular Japanese rock band X Japan, and they also remade "Tears" from the band. The remake song was included in their first album M.C the Max with the name "잠시만 안녕" (Farewell For Now). In addition, the second disc, which was included with their first album, consisted of songs entirely written and composed by the members themselves - one of which is "One Love", of the band's greatest hits along with "Farewell For Now" - which displays the members' musical abilities. Although the band still had the strong "Moon Child" image, through the resurgence under a new name, M.C the Max was building an image of a talented, singer/songwriter band.

In December 2003, M.C the Max made their comeback with their second full-length album Love Is Time Sixth Sense. The title track "Poem of Love" was composed by the frontman of Anzen Chitai, Kōji Tamaki. The new album would be released and sold simultaneously with Anzen Chitai's album, Anzen Chitai X. The album was met with great success and appealing to many Koreans, as M.C the Max won for the first time since debut on music programs. They won a total of 7 trophies with the title track and 2 triple crowns (winning consecutively for 3 times) on music programs such as the then Music Camp (the current Show! Music Core, and Inkigayo).

=== 2004–2005: Solitude Love, The Rusted Love, and In Search for Love ===
The following year, they released their third full-length album Solitude Love on November 18, 2004. The title track "Don't Be Happy" was composed by a singer-songwriter in Japan, Kohmi Hirose who released the million-selling single Romance no Kamisama. This third album consisted of several songs of the ballad genre than before. However, a situation where members Jeon Min-hyuk and J. Yoon did not want to enter (preparation) sessions since the release of their second full-length album in 2003 was revealed. M.C the Max members then lost their desire to continue activities, forcing their widening activities to be stopped abruptly. Despite this, M.C the Max won an additional 5 trophies and another triple crown with their title track on more music programs such as M! Countdown.

Even though the promotional activities for their third full-length album were stopped abruptly, that did not deter them from releasing a new album in 2005. They made a comeback after a year with their fourth full-length album The Rusted Love on November 23, 2005 and the title track "사랑은 아프려고 하는 거죠" (loosely translated to (We) Love in Order to be Hurt) won another 5 trophies on music programs.

The members then expanded their entertainment activity rather than releasing mainstream music. They ventured into contributing soundtracks for dramas and also releasing a compilation album. Most notably, they released the soundtrack "사랑하고 있네요" for the television series Which Star Are You From, and also released the compilation album In Search for Love. At the end of 2006, the members' contracts with Paramount Entertainment expired. As they did not own the band name, Paramount Entertainment tried to debut "M.C the Max 2" and member Lee Soo as a solo singer, independent from the group.

Lee Soo had objected to the decision, stating that "Unless this group consists of the three of us, we will not be able to release any music. The M.C in M.C the Max stands for Moon Child, and for the three of us only." which was against the policy of Paramount Entertainment. They then left the agency and signed a contract with a new agency named Vitamin Entertainment. However, Paramount Entertainment stated that they possessed the rights to the name M.C the Max until 2014, and had plans to add legal restrictions on the use of the name. After which, they filed a lawsuit for the name rights. Meanwhile, while the lawsuit was ongoing, M.C the Max was planning to release "볼때기 사랑", a song which they had recorded earlier. Later on, they released the song together with the digital single "The Perfect Ballad".

Lee Soo also released the soundtrack "나만의 슬픔" which was a remake song original sung by Kim Don-kyu for the musical drama "동화". In late 2006, the court made a decision in favour of M.C the Max, and Paramount Entertainment had to retract their decision to debut "M.C the Max 2". M.C the Max also claimed ownership for the four full-length albums they've released under the agency up till now.

=== 2007–2008: Returns, VIA 6, and Unlimited ===
M.C the Max then made a surprise announcement that they will release their fifth full-length album Returns on April 18, 2007. The album consists of songs that goes beyond the different types of ballad and traditional rock sounds. They stated that one of the few factors was to break the perception that M.C the Max was a ballad band. After the release of their fifth full-length album, M.C the Max also planned on releasing another repackaged album to meet their fans twice through album promotions. After the promotional activities for their album has been completed, Lee Soo also worked with the vocalist of Rumble Fish, Choi Jin-yi on the duet "Requiem".

Together with Choi Jin-yi, they also started working on Lee Soo's solo album "I Am" which was to be released in May 2008. Both J. Yoon and Jeon Min-hyuk also participated in the preparation sessions. J. Yoon and Davink was also active in project activities, being part of the electronica project band Monotonik. J. Yoon also collaborated with Shin Hae-chul who had produced their first album under the name Moon Child and their upcoming fifth full-length album to form the project group "Wittgenstein".

Among news of the members' solo and project activities, rumours that M.C the Max also began to spread. However, M.C the Max had squashed the rumours as they announced they were making their comeback with the release of their sixth full-length album VIA 6 on September 30, 2008 after a year and 5 months. To commemorate the release of their sixth full-length album, M.C the Max also announced that they were going on a national cpncert tour titled Eclipse around Korea.

They would begin their tour starting in Yonsei University in Seoul on October 18, before moving on to Seongnam Arts Center on November 8. This will be followed by the KBS Hall in Busan on November 15, before concluding in Daegu Health College in Daegu on December 20. They then became active in promotional activities with the title track off their sixth full-length album, "Unbeknown to Tears". On December 10, 2008, they also released a repackaged album in pictorial format titled Unlimited. They had originally produced 10,000 copies of the pictorial album, but due to high demands, they produced another 10,000 copies of the album.

=== 2009–2012: Military enlistment, Rewind & Remind, and hiatus ===
In 2009, M.C the Max released the live album "Moonchild Is Invincible" which contained the songs sung live in the 2007 concert of the same name. On June 13 and 14, M.C the Max members held their final concert titled "Goodbye for a moment" at Yonsei University before their military enlistment. A few days later on June 18, during the free time between their final concert and the date of their military enlistment, they released the special album "Rewind & Remind" online. The special album will also be made available at music stores on June 23.

On June 25, Lee Soo started his military service by enlisting as a public servant and entered the training camp. About a month later on July 27, Jeon Min-hyuk also followed and enlisted as part of the Republic of Korea Air Force. For J. Yoon, he had entered the training camp on September 17 but in the middle of training, he had sustained injuries during a concert in 2008 so he was forced to give up US citizenship and was also serving as a public service personnel.

In the middle of military service, M.C the Max also dropped a single album "So Sick". In late 2011, the members' military service has ended and they were discharged from the training camp. They held another year-end solo concert at Yongsan Art Hall from December 29 to 31, and released the soundtracks for the TV Chosun television series Korean Peninsula, as well as the television series The King's Doctor. They parted ways with Vitamin Entertainment and joined their current agency, Music&NEW.

=== 2014–2015: Unveiling ===
M.C the Max made their comeback in about 5 years with the release of their seventh full-length album Unveiling on January 2. This was their newest full-length album release since their sixth full-length album was dropped on 2008. Teasers for one of the tracks on the album, "Night We Shine" was released on December 17, 2013. Meanwhile, the teaser for the title track "Wind That Blows" was released on December 30.

Their title track "Wind That Blows" swept various music charts and remained in the 1st place upon its release. It also won the Ballad Music Star award at the 6th Melon Music Awards in 2014. Other songs on the album, including "Lying on your lips" and "Night We Shine" also won a lot of popularity among the public and overall, their comeback was a hugely successful one.

M.C the Max members also started venturing out to other areas of entertainment, and also started participating in the soundtracks for various television series. Most notably, member Lee Soo released "U" for the television series It's Okay, That's Love and the group also released "Looking at You for the television series Birth of a Beauty. Teasers for their soundtrack "Looking at You" were revealed on November 21.

Lee Soo also confirmed his participation on the third season of the popular MBC variety program I Am a Singer. However, due to previous stories that Lee Soo was involved in child prostitution which generated much publicity, the panelists of I Am a Singer objected to his participation. MBC responded saying that to prevent further controversy, Lee Soo ultimately would also not be able to participate in the variety program.

On April 23, their soundtrack "That Man" for the television series A Girl Who Sees Smells also became very popular and received a lot of love.

=== 2016–present: Pathos ===
On January 4, 2016, it was announced that M.C the Max will be making their comeback in 2 years with their 8th full-length album, pathos, in late January. At the same time, they will also be going on a national concert tour with the same title in Korea in February to commemorate the album's release as well as celebrate their 16th anniversary as a professional band. Apart from performing their latest songs from their soon-to-be released album, it was said that the members have also prepared some of the most spectacular performances for their fans in the concert. It will also be the first public performance to celebrate the release of their 8th full-length album. The first stop will be in Seoul and scheduled to be held on February 21 and 22, and tickets for the Seoul leg will go on sale at Interpark's ticketing website on January 8 at noon.

The ticket reservations are expected to be a fierce one, after their sold-out year-end concert titled Wintering... in 2014 proved their ticketing power. Concert details for other cities on the tour list include the KBS Hall in Busan on February 27, followed by Jeongsimhwa Hall at Chungnam National University in Daejeon on March 5, the Kyungbuk National University Auditorium in Daegu on March 12, Gyeonggi Arts Center in Suwon on March 19 before concluding at Cultural Arts Center in Gwangju on April 9. Tickets for all shows will be available on the Interpark's ticketing website as well. Teaser photos for the concert were then revealed on January 15. The poster is mysterious and intense, which raises expectations.

M.C the Max released the track list for their upcoming album on January 19 through their agency Music&NEW. The album will be released online on January 28 at midnight and offline at music stores on February 2. It consists of 10 songs including the title track No matter where. Notably, member Lee Soo took part in the songwriting for 7 songs on the album, in addition to taking part in the composing and arrangement for at least 3 songs. Later on, a teaser for the title track No matter where was released on January 24. Within hours of the album's release, the title track had topped 8 music charts, namely MelOn, Genie, Naver Music, Mnet, Bugs, Soribada, etc. Other songs on the albums also gained a lot of popularity and the album was met with huge success.

Separately, in an interview with Star News in January 2016, it was revealed that Heo Jung-min left the group to pursue a career in acting. In another interview with Maeil Business Newspaper (MK News) later in February 2016, he also revealed a similar reason for his departure. However, he recalled the times when he was in "Moon Child" a great one and after leaving, it enabled him to better focus on his acting career.

On June 13, it was revealed that J. Yoon has left the group. However, the agency Music&NEW has refuted these rumours, stating that "it is groundless and absolutely not the truth".

On September 1, 2016, it was reported that M.C the Max had chosen not to resign with label Music&NEW. They subsequently formed their own agency, 325 E&C—the "325" standing for their debut date of March 25, 2000.

On May 13, 2021, the group's agency was unable to get in contact with J.Yoon and they notified the authorities. Police arrived at his home in Seogyo-dong, Seoul, where he was found dead.

== Members ==
=== Current members ===
- Lee Soo (ko:이수) – vocals, guitar (2000–present)

=== Former members ===
- Heo Jung-min – electric organ (2000-2001)
- J. Yoon (ko:제이 윤) – leader, bass guitar, violin (2000–2021)
- Jeon Min-hyuk (ko:전민혁) – drums (2000–2022)

== Discography ==
As Moon Child

- Delete (2000)
- Because of Love (2001)

As M.C the Max

- M.C the Max (2002)
- Love Is Time Sixth Sense (2003)
- Solitude Love... (2004)
- The Rusted Love (2005)
- Returns (2007)
- Returns Part 2 (2007)
- Via 6 (2008)
- Rewind & Remind (2009)
- Unveiling (2014)
- Pathos (2016)
- Circular (2019)
- Ceremonia (2020)
- Eternity (2022)

== Awards and nominations ==
Year	Awards	Category	Work	Result	Ref
2004	19th Golden Disk Awards	Bonsang Award^{α}	M.C the Max	Won	
2004	2004 Mnet Asian Music Awards	Best Male Group Video	"Love Poem" (사랑의시)	Nominated	
2004	SBS Gayo Daejeon Awards	Bonsang Award	M.C the Max	Won	
2005	2005 Mnet Asian Music Awards	Best Male Group	"Don't Be Happy" (행복하지 말아요)	Nominated	
2005	SBS Gayo Daejeon Awards	Bonsang Award	M.C the Max	Won	
2006	21st Golden Disk Awards	Bonsang Award^{α}	M.C the Max	Won	
2007	Korean Entertainment Arts Awards	Best Singer/Group	M.C the Max	Won	
2007	2007 Mnet Asian Music Awards	Best Ballad Performance	"Stop My Heart"	Nominated	
2008	17th Seoul Music Awards	Bonsang Award^{β}	M.C the Max	Won	
2014	MelOn Music Awards	Ballad Music Star	"Wind That Blows (그대가 분다)"	Won	
2016	6th Gaon Chart K-Pop Awards	Long-Run Song of the Year	M.C the Max	Won	
2016	6th Gaon Chart K-Pop Awards	Popular Singer of the Year	M.C the Max	Won	
2018	MBC Plus X Genie Music Awards	Song of the Year	"My Way"	Nominated	
2018	MBC Plus X Genie Music Awards	OST Award	"My Way"	Nominated	
2018	MBC Plus X Genie Music Awards	Genie Music Popularity Award	M.C the Max	Nominated	
2019	Gaon Chart Music Awards	Song of the Year – January	After You've Gone	Won	
2019	Melon Music Awards	Top 10 Artists	M.C the Max	Won	
2019	Melon Music Awards	Artist of the Year	M.C the Max	Nominated	
2019	Melon Music Awards	Album of the Year	Circular	Nominated	
2019	Melon Music Awards	Best Ballad	"After You've Gone"	Nominated	
2019	Melon Music Awards	Song of the Year	"After You've Gone"	Nominated	
2019	Mnet Asian Music Award	Best Band Performance	"After You've Gone"	Nominated	
2019	Mnet Asian Music Award	Song of the Year	"After You've Gone"	Nominated	
2019	Mnet Asian Music Award	Worldwide Fans’ Choice Top 10	M.C the Max	Nominated	
2020	Mnet Asian Music Award	Worldwide Fans’ Choice Top 10	M.C the Max	Nominated	
2020	Mnet Asian Music Award	Song of the Year	"Bloom"	Nominated	
2020	Mnet Asian Music Award	Best Band Performance	"Bloom"	Nominated	
2020	Gaon Chart Music Awards	MuBeat Global Choice Award (Male)	M.C the Max	Nominated	

- ^α For Golden Disc Awards, Bonsang awards (Main Prize) are given to up to ten music groups. One of the groups is chosen for a Grand Prize (Daesang). A Disk Bonsang/Daesang is an Album of the Year, while a Digital Bonsang/Daesang is a Song of the Year.
- ^β For Seoul Music Awards Best Artists, Bonsang awards are given to up to 12 music groups. One of the groups is chosen for a Daesang.
- ^γ For Mnet Asian Music Awards Song of the Year, Initial nominees are a pool of about 15-20 artists, of which 5 are finalists and 1 is a winner.
- ^δ Mnet Asian Music Awards occasionally hand out special awards that are uniquely named or have a limited run.
