= Kim Rae-won =

South Korean actor

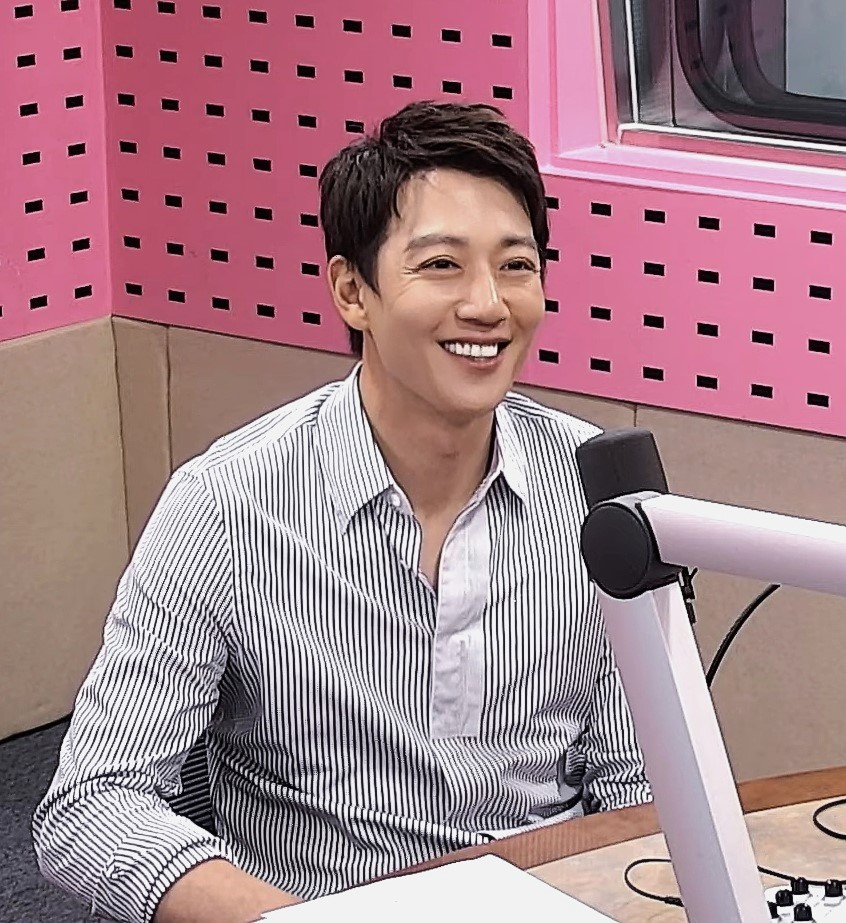
- Kim in June 2019
- Born: March 19, 1981 (age 45); Gangneung, Gangwon Province, South Korea
- Education: Chung-Ang University - Theater and Film
- Occupation: Actor
- Years active: 1997–present
- Agent: Whale Company

Korean name
- Hangul: 김래원
- Hanja: 金來沅
- RR: Gim Raewon
- MR: Kim Raewŏn

Kim Rae-won (Korean: 김래원; born March 19, 1981) is a South Korean actor. He first rose to fame with his appearances in the 2003 romantic comedy series Cats on the Roof. He is best known for the movies My Little Bride (2004), Sunflower (2006), The Prison (2017), as well as television series Love Story in Harvard (2004), Gourmet (2008), A Thousand Days' Promise (2011), Punch (2014–2015), The Doctors (2016), Black Knight: The Man Who Guards Me (2018), and The First Responders (2022–2023).

== Career ==
Kim Rae-won initially wanted to become a professional basketball player, but when an injured ankle tendon ended that childhood dream, he turned to acting and studied Theater and Film at Chung-Ang University. He made his acting debut in the 1997 teen drama Me, in the role of a newbie at the broadcasting club of his high school. This was followed by another teen drama, School 2 (1999) and coming-of-age film Plum Blossom (2000).

In 2002, Kim rose to fame after starring in the romance comedy drama My Love Patzzi. His popularity further increased in 2003, playing a law student slacker who cohabitates with a girl (Jeong Da-bin) in the popular romance series Cats on the Roof. He then played a carefree photographer who enters the life of an introverted girl in melodrama ...ing and starred in the romantic comedy film My Little Bride, in the role of a college graduate forced to marry a high school girl (Moon Geun-young). My Little Bride became a sleeper hit and was the second top-grossing Korean film of 2004.

Kim continued playing romantic heroes on television, in dramas such as Snowman (2003), Love Story in Harvard (2004), and Which Star Are You From (2006). But on the big screen, he focused on darker, more masculine fare. He played a lowlife-turned-cop in Mr. Socrates (2005), a former gangster attempting to turn over a new leaf in Sunflower (2006), and an antihero art restorer in Insadong Scandal (2009).

In 2008, Kim played an elementary school teacher who falls for a Korean-Japanese jewelry designer (Mirai Yamamoto) in the Japanese film Flower Shadow (花影, Hanakage). Later that year, he starred as a genius aspiring chef in Gourmet, a hit series based on Huh Young-man's manhwa Sikgaek.

Kim then explored the melodrama genre in A Thousand Days' Promise (2011), by renowned TV screenwriter Kim Soo-hyun. Kim impressed the audience with his portrayal of a character torn between the longtime girlfriend whom his parents approve of, and the woman he truly loves (Soo Ae) who has early-onset Alzheimer's disease.

In the 2012 film My Little Hero (released internationally as A Wonderful Moment), Kim played a cynical music director who "discovers" a young boy in an audition contest. He next starred in 2014 legal thriller Punch, where he wowed critics with his portrayal of a prosecutor who is diagnosed with a terminal illness and decides to use his remaining six months to bring down the corrupt officials within the legal system.

This was followed by Gangnam Blues, a 2015 noir action film by director Yoo Ha about the seedy underbelly behind the rapid real estate development of Gangnam in the 1970s. Kim shed 15 kilograms to make his role as a fist-fighting gangster more realistic. He then made his small-screen comeback in the SBS's medical drama Doctors opposite Park Shin-hye. The drama topped viewership ratings and popularity charts during its 10-week broadcast. Following Doctors, Kim experienced a rise in popularity and commercial offers.

In 2017, Kim starred in the crime action film The Prison alongside Han Suk-kyu, playing a former detective behind bars. The film became a surprise hit at the box office and received critical acclaim; and Kim was praised for his realistic execution of action scenes. Kim next starred in mystery thriller film RV: Resurrected Victims by Kwak Kyung-taek. The same year, Kim made his television comeback in fantasy romance drama Black Knight: The Man Who Guards Me.

In September 2018, Kim was cast in the action film Long Live The King alongside Won Jin-ah, based on a webtoon of the same name. Kim took the role of a mob boss who campaigned and became a politician. In 2019, Kim was also cast in the romantic comedy film Crazy Romance alongside Snowman co-star Gong Hyo-jin.

In July 2021, HB Entertainment's contract ended and Kim decided not to renew it.

In 2022, Kim returns to the small screen with the SBS drama The First Responders, his first terrestrial television in six years since 2016. The second season premiered in 2023. In April 2022, it was reported that Kim had formed the Whale Company, an entity Kim founded as a sole agency.

== Personal life ==
On 28 September 2011, Kim was reportedly involved in a physical altercation with a waitress at a bar in Gangnam, Seoul where he and employees of his then-agency Bless Entertainment were drinking. He issued a denial, claiming he had only interceded in a verbal argument between the woman and an agency rep, and later made a public apology regarding the incident.

Kim has long been rumored to come from a very affluent family, which he denied in a 14 January 2013 guest appearance on talk show Healing Camp, though he confirmed that he did inherit an apartment unit during middle school as well as a large sum of money from his grandmother.

Kim is a practicing Roman Catholic.

== Filmography ==
=== Film ===
Year	Title	Role	Notes	Ref.
1998	Scent of a Man	young Kwon Hyuk-soo		
2000	Harpy	Kang Hyun-woo		
2000	Plum Blossom	Kim Ja-hyo		
2002	2424	Han Ik-su		
2003	...ing	Young-jae		
2004	My Little Bride	Park Sang-min		
2005	Mr. Socrates	Ku Dong-hyuk		
2006	Sunflower	Oh Tae-sik		
2008	Flower Shadow	Seung-woo		
2009	Insadong Scandal	Lee Kang-jun		
2013	My Little Hero	Yoo Il-han		
2015	Gangnam Blues	Baek Yong-ki		
2017	RV: Resurrected Victims	Seo Jin-hong		
2017	The Prison	Song Yoo-gun		
2019	Long Live The King	Jang Sae-chool		
2019	Crazy Romance	Jae-hoon		
2022	Decibel	Kang Do-young		
2023	The Moon	Lee Sang-won	Special appearance	

=== Television series ===
Year	Title	Role	Notes	Ref.
1997	Me			
1998	Soonpoong Clinic	Kim Rae-won		
1998	MBC Best Theater "Her Flower Pot No. 1"		one act-drama	
1999	School 2	Lee Han		
1999	Hometown of Legends	Jang-su, Goguryeo Shinjo		
2000	It's Half	Choi Jung-shik		
2000	The Thief's Daughter	Deok-gyeong		
2001	Life Is Beautiful	Lee Jae-min		
2001	Wuri's Family	Lee Young-hoon		
2002	My Love Patzzi	Kim Hyun-sung		
2003	Snowman	Cha Sung-joon		
2003	Cats on the Roof	Lee Kyung-min		
2004	Say You Love Me	Kim Byung-soo		
2004	Love Story in Harvard	Kim Hyun-woo		
2006	Which Star Are You From	Choi Seung-hee		
2008	Gourmet	Lee Sung-chan		
2011	A Thousand Days' Promise	Park Ji-hyung		
2014–2015	Punch	Park Jung-hwan		
2016	The Doctors	Hong Ji-hong		
2017–2018	Black Knight: The Man Who Guards Me	Moon Soo-ho		
2021	L.U.C.A.: The Beginning	Ji Oh		
2022–2023	The First Responders	Jin Ho-gae	Season 1–2	
2027	Full Count	Hwang Jin-ho		

== Accolades ==
=== Awards and nominations ===
Name of the award ceremony, year presented, category, nominee of the award, and the result of the nomination
Award ceremony	Year	Category	Nominee / Work	Result	Ref.
Andre Kim Best Star Awards	2003	Best Star Award	Kim Rae-won	Won	
Andre Kim Best Star Awards	2007	Best Star Award	Kim Rae-won	Won	
APAN Star Awards	2015	Top Excellence Award, Actor in a Miniseries	Punch	Nominated	
APAN Star Awards	2016	Top Excellence Award, Actor in a Miniseries	The Doctors	Nominated	
Baeksang Arts Awards	2004	Best Actor – Television	Cats on the Roof	Nominated	
Baeksang Arts Awards	2005	Most Popular Actor (Film)	My Little Bride	Won	
Baeksang Arts Awards	2015	Best Actor – Television	Punch	Nominated	
Blue Dragon Film Awards	2000	Best New Actor	Plum Blossom	Won	
Chungbuk International Martial Arts And Action Film Festival	2019	Best Actor	Long Live The King	Won	
Grand Bell Awards	2001	Best New Actor	Harpy	Nominated	
Grand Bell Awards	2004	Best New Actor	My Little Bride	Won	
KBS Drama Awards	1999	Best Young Actor	School 2	Won	
KBS Drama Awards	2018	Top Excellence Award, Actor	Black Knight: The Man Who Guards Me	Nominated	
KBS Drama Awards	2018	Excellence Award, Actor in a Mid-length Drama	Black Knight: The Man Who Guards Me	Nominated	
KBS Drama Awards	2018	Netizen Award, Actor	Black Knight: The Man Who Guards Me	Nominated	
KBS Drama Awards	2018	Best Couple Award	Kim Rae-won (with Shin Se-kyung); Black Knight: The Man Who Guards Me	Nominated	
Korea Best Dresser Swan Awards	2003	Best Dressed	Kim Rae-won	Won	
Korea Drama Awards	2008	Excellence Award, Actor	Gourmet	Won	
Korea Drama Awards	2016	Grand Prize (Daesang)	The Doctors	Nominated	
Korea Movie Star Awards	2007	Excellence Award in Action	Sunflower	Won	
MBC Drama Awards	2002	Best New Actor	My Love Patzzi	Nominated	
MBC Drama Awards	2003	Top Excellence Award, Actor	Cats on the Roof	Won	
MBC Drama Awards	2003	Popularity Award, Actor	Cats on the Roof	Won	
MBC Drama Awards	2003	Best Couple Award	Kim Rae-won (with Jung Da-bin); Cats on the Roof	Nominated	
MBC Drama Awards	2006	Top Excellence Award, Actor	Which Star Are You From	Nominated	
MBC Drama Awards	2006	Popularity Award, Actor	Which Star Are You From	Nominated	
MBC Drama Awards	2006	Best Couple Award	Kim Rae-won (with Jung Ryeo-won); Which Star Are You From	Nominated	
SBS Drama Awards	2004	Top Excellence Award, Actor	Love Story in Harvard	Nominated	
SBS Drama Awards	2004	Excellence Award, Actor in a Special Planning Drama	Love Story in Harvard	Nominated	
SBS Drama Awards	2004	Netizen Popularity Award	Love Story in Harvard	Won	
SBS Drama Awards	2004	Top 10 Stars	Love Story in Harvard	Won	
SBS Drama Awards	2008	Top Excellence Award, Actor	Gourmet	Nominated	
SBS Drama Awards	2008	Excellence Award, Actor in a Special Planning Drama	Gourmet	Nominated	
SBS Drama Awards	2008	Netizen Popularity Award	Gourmet	Nominated	
SBS Drama Awards	2008	Top 10 Stars	Gourmet	Won	
SBS Drama Awards	2008	Best Couple Award	Kim Rae-won (with Nam Sang-mi); Gourmet	Nominated	
SBS Drama Awards	2011	Top Excellence Award, Actor in a Special Planning Drama	A Thousand Days' Promise	Won	
SBS Drama Awards	2011	Netizen Popularity Award	A Thousand Days' Promise	Nominated	
SBS Drama Awards	2011	Top 10 Stars	A Thousand Days' Promise	Won	
SBS Drama Awards	2011	Best Couple Award	Kim Rae-won (with Soo Ae); A Thousand Days' Promise	Nominated	
SBS Drama Awards	2015	Grand Prize (Daesang)	Punch	Nominated	
SBS Drama Awards	2015	Top Excellence Award, Actor in a Mid-Length Drama	Punch	Nominated	
SBS Drama Awards	2015	PD Award	Punch	Won	
SBS Drama Awards	2016	Top Excellence Award, Actor in a Genre Drama	The Doctors	Won	
SBS Drama Awards	2016	Best Couple Award	Kim Rae-won (with Park Shin-hye); The Doctors	Nominated	
SBS Drama Awards	2022	Grand Prize (Daesang)	The First Responders	Nominated	
SBS Drama Awards	2022	Top Excellence Award, Actor in a Miniseries Genre/Fantasy Drama	The First Responders	Won	
SBS Drama Awards	2023	Grand Prize (Daesang)	The First Responders 2	Nominated	
SBS Drama Awards	2023	Top Excellence Award, Actor in a Seasonal Drama	The First Responders 2	Nominated	

=== State honors ===
Name of country, year given, and name of honor
Country or Organization	Year	Honor or Award	Ref.
Savings Day	2006	Presidential Commendation	
