= Heo Jung-min =

South Korean actor and musician (born 1982)

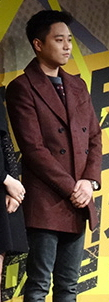
- Heo in 2014
- Born: November 11, 1982 (age 43); Seoul, South Korea
- Occupation: Actor • musician
- Years active: 2001–present
- Agent: Acom My ENT
- Works: Marriage, Not Dating

Korean name
- Hangul: 허정민
- RR: Heo Jeongmin
- MR: Hŏ Chŏngmin

Heo Jung-min (Korean: 허정민; born November 11, 1982) is a South Korean actor and musician. He was a member of the rock band Moon Child (now known as MC the Max) from 2000 to 2001. As an actor, he had a lead role in the 2014 South Korean television series Marriage, Not Dating.

== Career ==
Heo Jung-min was a former member of Moon Child, he later left after the release of the second album to pursue solo activities in Korea, he made his acting debut with the lead role of Moon Seung-man of My Love Patzzi.

== Filmography ==
=== Film ===
Year	Title	Role
2005	Mr. Socrates	
2013	Fancy Walk	

=== Television series ===
Year	Title	Role	Notes
1995	Sandglass		
2002	My Love Patzzi	Moon Seung-man	
2003	Something About 1%	Kim Joon-hyun	
2003	The Bean Chaff of My Life	Choi Eun-ho	
2003	Merry Go Round	Myung-ja's son	
2004	My 19 Year Old Sister-in-Law	Han Kang-pyo	
2005	Princess Lulu	Jung-min	
2005	The Barefooted Youth	Bong Chun-dong	
2006	Mr. Goodbye	Ronnie	
2006	A Woman's Choice	Ahn Jin-mo	
2007	Capital Scandal	Shin Se-ki	
2007	Legend of Hyang Dan	Bang-ja	
2008	Chunja's Special Day	Nam Gi-seok	
2008	Little Mom Scandal	Jung Woo-yub	
2011	KBS Drama Special	Kim Ji-hoon	Episode "Ji-hoon, Born in 1982"
2012	Dream of the Emperor	Buyeo Tae	
2013	All About My Romance	Seo Yoon-ki	
2013	KBS Drama Special	Kyung-woon	Episode "Outlasting Happiness"
2014	Pluto Secret Society	Choi Ki-chan	
2014	Marriage, Not Dating	Lee Hoon-dong	
2015	Shine or Go Crazy	Yang Gyu-dal	
2015	All Is Well	Jang Jin-gook	
2015	Wings of an Angel	Choi Gi-chan	
2016	Another Miss Oh	Park Hoon	
2017	Introverted Boss	Eom Sun-bong	
2017	Go Back	Ahn Jae-woo	
2018	Evergreen	Oh Ga-na	
2018	100 Days My Prince	Kim Soo-ji	
2019	The Dramatization Has Already Begun	Park Sang-Geun	
2020	Love with Flaws	Park Hyun-soo	
2022	Café Minamdang	Hypnotic detective	Cameo (episode 10)
2022	Mental Coach Jegal	Pistol Park Hyun-soo	

=== Variety show ===
Year	Title	Role
2016	King of Mask Singer	Contestant as "Returning Home in Glory on the Way Home", episode 75
2018	Creaking Heroes	Cast Member
