= Cats on the Roof =

South Korean television series

- Promotional poster
- Also known as: Attic Cat; Cat on the Roof; Cat in the Rooftop Flat; Rooftop Romance
- Hangul: 옥탑방 고양이
- Hanja: 屋塔房 고양이
- RR: Oktapbang goyangi
- MR: Okt'appang koyangi
- Written by: Min Hyo-jung; Goo Sun-kyung
- Story by: Kim Yu-ri
- Directed by: Kim Sa-hyun
- Starring: Kim Rae-won; Jeong Da-bin
- Country of origin: South Korea
- Original language: Korean
- No. of episodes: 16

Production
- Running time: 50 minutes

Original release
- Network: Munhwa Broadcasting Corporation
- Release: June 2 – July 22, 2003

Cats on the Roof (Korean: 옥탑방 고양이; RR: Oktapbang goyangi; lit. 'Rooftop Room Cat') is a 2003 South Korean television series starring Kim Rae-won, Jeong Da-bin, Choi Jung-yoon and Lee Hyun-woo. It aired on MBC from June 2 to July 22, 2003 on Mondays and Tuesdays at 21:55 for 16 episodes.

A comedy with light touches of drama about friendship, love and cohabitation, the series is loosely based on a web novel written by Kim Yu-ri. It was a hit, receiving an average viewership rating of 26.3% and a peak rating of 37.3%.

== Overview ==
Kyung-min, a law student, is in desperate straits, so he decides to take it upon himself to help Hye-ryun's poor friend, Jung-eun. This is the beginning of an extremely volatile friendship that somehow ends with the two of them living together under one roof, or to be more specific, living in a room on top of the roof of an old building.

This setting provides the backdrop for this unlikely love story. Kyung-min's ways clash with Jung-eun's simple living, as he steadily takes advantage of her kindness and good nature.

== Cast ==
- Kim Rae-won as Lee Kyung-min
- Jeong Da-bin as Nam Jung-eun
- Choi Jung-yoon as Na Hye-ryun
- Lee Hyun-woo as Yoo Dong-joon
- Jang Yong as Nam Sang-sik, Jung-eun's father
- Kim Ja-ok as Kim Soon-deok, Jung-eun's mother
- Bong Tae-gyu as Nam Jung-woo, Jung-eun's younger brother
- Kim Mu-saeng as Lee Pil-deuk, Kyung-min's grandfather
- Kang Boo-ja as Lee Kyung-hee, Kyung-min's grandmother
- Kim Chang-sook as Hye-ryun's mother
- Cha Joo-ik as Kyung-min's aunt
- Kim Tae-hyun as Joon-ho, Kyung-min's college friend
- Seo Hyun

== Production ==
Cats on the Roof was adapted from a web novel on the female-oriented web portal Miclub. Min Hyo-jung and Goo Sun-kyung co-wrote the series; it was the first miniseries both had penned. At the time of its announcement, Kim Rae-won had been cast as the male lead, but the female lead had not yet been chosen. It reportedly ran into troubles with casting; an Ilgan Sports article in April stated that Han Eun-jung would play alongside Kim as the female lead, but by May Jeong Da-bin was said to have taken the role.

An additional episode was arranged to air a week after the drama's planned ending, but it was cancelled due to scheduling conflicts with Kim Rae-won. Additionally, the ending was changed last minute—originally, Jung Da-bin's character, Jeong-eun, would visit Kyung-min, Kim's character, after three years spent studying abroad. On the morning before the last episode's airing, the script was modified so that Jeong-eun would not study abroad and instead live with Kyung-min.

== Theatre adaptation ==
It was adapted into a stage play of the same title in 2010, with Lee Sun-ho and Hwang Bo-ra in the leading roles.
