= Gangnam Blues =

2015 South Korean neo-noir action film

- Theatrical release poster
- Hangul: 강남 1970
- Hanja: 江南 1970
- RR: Gangnam 1970
- MR: Kangnam 1970
- Directed by: Yoo Ha
- Written by: Yoo Ha
- Produced by: Yoo Ha; Yu Jeong-hun
- Starring: Lee Min-ho; Kim Rae-won
- Cinematography: Kim Tae-seong; Hong Seong-hyuk
- Edited by: Park Gok-ji
- Music by: Jo Yeong-wook
- Production company: m.o.vera Pictures
- Distributed by: Showbox/Mediaplex
- Release date: January 21, 2015
- Running time: 135 minutes
- Country: South Korea
- Language: Korean
- Box office: US$16.2 million

Gangnam Blues (Korean: 강남 1970) is a 2015 South Korean neo-noir action film written and directed by Yoo Ha, and starring Lee Min-ho and Kim Rae-won. The film is set in the 1970s against the backdrop of the real estate development of the Gangnam region of Seoul amidst socio-political turmoil and terrorism. The friendship of two childhood friends is tested as they find themselves entangled in the collusion and battles between political powers and criminal organizations.

== Synopsis ==
In the 1970s, during the height of political corruption, Gangnam, the southern part of Seoul, is starting to transform into a developed area. Childhood friends, Jong-dae (Lee Min-ho) and Yong-ki (Kim Rae-won) struggle to get by, until their shanty homes are demolished by local thugs. Desperate for cash, they get involved in violent political clashes, and are separated during one of the skirmishes.

Three years later, Jong-dae lives as an adopted son of a former gang leader, Gil-soo (Jung Jin-young) and unknown to him, as a small-time gangster. Meanwhile, Yong-ki has risen as a made man inside Seoul's most powerful criminal organization, the Myeongdong-pa, under Yang Ki-taek (Jung Ho-bin). Jong-dae acquaints Min Seong-hee (Kim Ji-soo) and is entangled in real estate business through the tips Min Seong-hee gets from Park Seung-gu (Choi Jin-ho). Together, they enter into a bigger business of land-dealing. Jong-dae finally crosses paths with Yong-ki and they decide to co-operate and plan to eventually come into possession of what they desire; Jong-dae desires land while Yong-ki wants money. Min Seong-hee introduces Jong-dae to a disgraced politician, Seo Tae-gon (Yoo Seung-mok), who still has political connections and they agree to raise him up in the ladder of the political arena. They enter high-stake battles going on between various political parties over land in Gangnam, to acquire land before its value shoots up, after being tipped on intel from the inside about the government's plan to include Gangnam as an extended part of the capital.

While the gangs fight over the rights to various plots and to maintain dominance in the power structure, Yong-ki betrays his people and eliminates opposition with Jong-dae. After falling under suspicion, Yong-ki kills Gil-soo to regain his gang's trust and keeps the truth from Jong-dae. Jong-dae finds out the truth on his own and keeps an eye on him. Meanwhile, Yong-ki's gang motivates him to overthrow Jong-dae when the mission is over and take over the entire gang and operation. After Seo Tae-gon's final mission, Yong-ki sets an ambush to kill Jong-dae, but Jong-dae, who is one step ahead, eliminates Yong-ki's gang members and spares Yong-ki after telling him to disappear.

Seo Tae-gon, to turn a new leaf in his career, recruits two new goons as his henchmen and assigns them to assassinate both Jong-dae and Yong-ki and they do so, while Seo Tae-gon announces his nomination for election. The ruling government then declares its intent to adjoin Gangnam to its capital. After years, an aged Seo Tae-gon addresses the developed city of Gangnam about his commitment to the city.

== Cast ==
- Lee Min-ho as Kim Jong-dae
- Kim Rae-won as Baek Yong-ki
- Jung Jin-young as Kang Gil-soo
- Kim Seol-hyun as Kang Seon-hye
- Kim Ji-soo as Min Seong-hee
- Han Joon-woo as Tom
- Yoo Seung-mok as Seo Tae-gon
- Han Jae-young as Park Chang-bae
- Jung Ho-bin as Yang Ki-taek
- Choi Jin-ho as Park Seung-gu
- Um Hyo-sup as Kim Jung-kyu
- Heo Seong-min as Jae-pil
- Kim Yoo-yeon as Jeom-soon
- Ji Dae-han as Chang Deok-jae
- Yoon Jong-hwa as Hwa-sang
- Kim Hyun as Banquet hall waltz team
- Choi Byung-mo as Section chief Mun
- Lee Jin-kwon as Myeongdong Gang
- Lee Seok as Chun-ho
- Kwak Min-ho as Min-kyu
- Jeon Bae-soo as Chairman Gu
- Park Min-gyu as Cheol-seung
- Jang In-ho as Myeong-chun
- Park Hyeok-min as Gyeong-pyo
- Jo Mun-ui as Saudi Kim
- Park Tong-il as Mayor of Seoul

== Production ==
This was the final film in director-screenwriter Yoo Ha's "street series" trilogy, after Once Upon a Time in High School (2004) and A Dirty Carnival (2006). He called it "a story about people who are used, then discarded, about lives that are, like the buildings they live in, unauthorized. [...] represents the obsession over land ― land from which we are born, to which we return when we die. It is a feast of all things wretched."

Yoo originally didn't want to cast Lee Min-ho in the leading role, finding Lee's breakout performance in TV series Boys Over Flowers "a bit cheesy" and that the actor was "so handsome he was like a manhwa character". But after being convinced by his wife, Yoo realized the potentially huge impact of "flower boy" actors completely transforming their image, and together they collaborated to "burn to the ground" Lee's previous screen persona as a chaebol's son.

Yoo also asked actor Kim Rae-won to shed 15 kilograms since his character works as a rag man in the beginning of the film; Kim lost the weight in one month, which he said also made his fist-fighting scenes as a gangster more realistic.

Filming began on April 16, 2014 and wrapped on August 31, 2014.

The early Korean working title was Gangnam Blues (강남 블루스), which was changed to Gangnam 1970 in October 2014. Gangnam Blues was retained as the international English title.

== Release ==
=== South Korea ===
Gangnam Blues was released in 684 theaters in South Korea on January 21, 2015. Despite its "restricted" rating, it topped the box office on its opening day, with 152,500 tickets sold. Within 5 days, it had reached the 1 million admission mark (1,097,103). After 35 days of release, the film recorded 2.19 million admissions.

An uncensored version (running time: 141 minutes) became available for streaming on VOD service IPTV on March 19, 2015.

=== China ===
The film was released with a different cut for the Chinese market in March 2015, in order to capitalize on Lee Min-ho's big fan base in the region. The new cut included more scenes of Lee, including those further developing the relationship between Lee's character and his love interest (played by Kim Seol-hyun), as well as an alternate ending.

== Critical reception ==
Modern Korean Cinema's Pierce Conran called the film "an evocative and immensely entertaining saga that pits a common tale of brotherhood and betrayal against a thrilling period setting mired in violence and corruption" and praised it as "one of the most beautifully designed and lushly filmed Korean productions ever made". He found Lee Min-ho "thoroughly convincing as a rising gangster with a cool exterior and emotional core", but that Kim Rae-won's performance had "a little less depth", yet nevertheless was Kim's best performance since 2006's Sunflower, in which he also played a gangster.

== Soundtrack ==
The song "Anak" by Freddie Aguilar was used for the trailer and film in both Filipino and Korean versions.

== Awards and nominations ==
Year	Award	Category	Recipient	Result
2015	51st Baeksang Arts Awards	Best New Actor	Lee Min-ho	Nominated
2015	51st Baeksang Arts Awards	Best New Actress	Kim Seol-hyun	Nominated
2015	51st Baeksang Arts Awards	Most Popular Actor	Lee Min-ho	Won
2015	19th Bucheon International Fantastic Film Festival	Producers' Choice Award	Lee Min-ho	Won
2015	52nd Grand Bell Awards	Best New Actor	Lee Min-ho	Won
2015	52nd Grand Bell Awards	Best New Actress	Kim Seol-hyun	Nominated
2015	36th Blue Dragon Film Awards	Best New Actor	Lee Min-ho	Nominated
2015	36th Blue Dragon Film Awards	Best New Actress	Kim Seol-hyun	Nominated
2015	36th Blue Dragon Film Awards	Technical Award	Shin Jae-myung	Nominated
2015	36th Blue Dragon Film Awards	Popular Star Award	Lee Min-ho	Won
2015	36th Blue Dragon Film Awards	Popular Star Award	Kim Seol-hyun	Won
2015	Korean Association of Film Critics Awards	Best New Actor	Lee Min-ho	Nominated
2016	11th Max Movie Awards	Best New Actor	Lee Min-ho	Nominated
2016	11th Max Movie Awards	Rising Star Award	Kim Seol-hyun	Won
2016	5th Marie Claire Film Festival	Rookie Award	Kim Seol-hyun	Won
