= 100 Days My Prince =

2018 South Korean TV series

- Promotional poster
- Also known as: Dear Husband of 100 Days
- Hangul: 백일의 낭군님
- Hanja: 百日의 郎君님
- Lit.: Hundred-Day Husband
- RR: Baegirui nanggunnim
- MR: Paegirŭi nanggunnim
- Genre: Historical; Romantic comedy
- Created by: Studio Dragon
- Written by: No Ji-sul
- Directed by: Lee Jong-jae; Nam Sung-woo
- Starring: Doh Kyung-soo; Nam Ji-hyun; Jo Sung-ha; Jo Han-chul; Kim Seon-ho; Han So-hee; Kim Jae-young
- Music by: Kim Joon-seok; Jeong Se-rin
- Country of origin: South Korea
- Original language: Korean
- No. of episodes: 16 + 2 special

Production
- Executive producer: Lee Chan-ho
- Producers: Son Jae-hyun; Kim Ye-jin; Lee Sang-baek
- Camera setup: Single-camera
- Running time: 67–85 minutes
- Production company: AStory

Original release
- Network: tvN
- Release: September 10 – October 30, 2018

100 Days My Prince (Korean: 백일의 낭군님) is a 2018 South Korean television series starring Doh Kyung-soo and Nam Ji-hyun. The series aired on tvN from September 10 to October 30, 2018, every Monday and Tuesday at 21:30 (KST). It is one of the highest-rated Korean dramas in cable television history.

== Plot ==
Lee Yul is the king's nephew who enjoys spending his days playing instead of studying. He enjoys playing with the peasant children alongside his best friend and guardian, Dong-joo. One day, as he is playing with the peasant children where they are playing as Villains, Yul uses his nobility status to punish the children by beating them up, oblivious that his actions were hurting them. The children could not object to this treatment due to Yul's status. A girl, Yoon Yi-seo intervenes and chides Yul for his cruel actions. Like Yul, Yi-seo is from a noble family, but is kind, smart and compassionate. Yul instantly develops a crush on Yi-seo and this causes him to change and become more studious in order to impress her. Yi-seo's father is a general and the right-hand man of the King.

However, Yul's father is an ambitious man who is jealous of his brother, the King, and vies for the throne. Scheming with another ambitious man, Kim Cha-eon, they plot to overthrow the current King, with the promise that Cha-eon will be handsomely rewarded. One night, Kim Cha-eon begins the coup which sees the King, all his men and allies ruthlessly murdered, including Yi-seo's father. While fatally injured, Yi-seo's father instructs his elder son Seok-ha to take Yi-seo and run away, as Cha-eon is determined to wipe out the entire family. As Cha-eon is about to deal with the killing blow, Yul, who has been witnessing the whole thing, comes out from his hiding place to stop Cha-eon, threatening that he will report this matter to his father. Cha-eon then carries Yul back to his father's mansion and it is then made known that he has been conspiring with Cha-eon for the whole thing all along, shocking Yul. Yul is removed from the scene and the coup is completed successfully. Due to this, Yul's father is crowned as the new King and Cha-eon becomes the Vice-Premier. Yul automatically assumes the title of Crown Prince, and is further shocked on the coronation day with the news of his mother's "accidental death". Despite the new King's surprise at the news, it becomes clear that the Vice-Premier will be the person who has the most power and control of the new reign. Yul bitterly resents his new position as the Crown Prince of Joseon.

Sixteen years later, Yul has grown up to be a cold and unlikable Crown Prince, due to the trauma of his past. Yul is also very smart and skilled in the martial arts. His father is now remarried to the new queen who dislikes him and wants the Crown Prince title for her own son while he himself is married to Kim So-hye, who is Vice-Premier Kim's daughter. Despite the marriage, Yul still longs for Yi-seo, even though he believes that Yi-seo was killed. This causes him to despise the Crown Princess and her father. Yul constantly avoids consummating the marriage, despite the various schemes to ensure the consummation takes place. At the same time, a drought occurs in Joseon and people begin to blame Yul and his refusal to consummate the marriage as the reason. Annoyed, Yul orders all the singles in the nation to be married off in a month to help alleviate the drought.

While en route to a rain ritual, Yul and his followers are ambushed by assassins arranged by Cha-eon, and he is almost killed. It is discovered that the Crown Princess was pregnant with another's child (later revealed to be Mu Yeon's, Hong-shim/Yi-Seo's brother) and the Crown Prince's assassination attempt was to help her escape from her predicament. His childhood friend and guardian, Dong-joo, forces them to switch their garments, essentially luring the attackers away from Yul. Dong-joo is subsequently killed and falls into the river. The attackers do not see his face and thus believe that it is Yul. Meanwhile, Yul gets shot with an arrow on his chest while on the run, and accidentally knocks his head, becoming unconscious. When he wakes up, he realizes that he lost all of his memories.

Yi-seo, who managed to escape unscathed in the coup years ago, has been adopted by a commoner man and now lives undercover as a peasant girl named Hong-shim in Songjoo Village. It is her adoptive father who eventually finds the terribly wounded Yul and nurses him back to consciousness. The fate of her brother Seok-ha is unknown, as they separated after Seok-ha buried her under a stack of leaves and ran away to lure Cha-eon's people who were hunting them in the woods. Before separating, they promised to wait for each other at a bridge every full moon. While Yi-seo goes to the bridge as promised without fail, it has been sixteen years since the separation and she is beginning to lose hope that her brother is still alive.

As a single woman, Hong-shim is also subjected to the crown prince's marriage decree and she happens to be the oldest single woman in the village. Due to the imbalance number of single men and women, Hong-shim finds herself the only one without a pair. Instead, she receives an offer to become the concubine of a lecherous nobleman. Hong-shim refuses because she says that she is already betrothed to a man named Won-deuk who is serving in the military and has no intention of being the nobleman's fifth wife. The deadline for the decree passes by and since Hong-shim is still unmarried, she is subjected to the punishment of 100 floggings. To save her, her father takes advantage of Yul's amnesia. A very skeptical Yul is told that he is Hong-shim's betrothed, Won-deuk, a man whom her father had recommended but whom she had never met.

Thus, Yi-seo and Yul get married and neither of them is aware of each other's true identities. The rest of the story follows how the prince seems very strange to the commoner's lifestyle and is initially considered a good-for-nothing-husband by the villagers. However, his skills of reading, writing and martial arts remain which impresses Hong-shim and the villagers. He eventually returns to the palace and regains his memories of Yi-seo later and the two reunite again.

== Cast ==
=== Main ===
- Doh Kyung-soo as Lee Yul / Na Won-deuk
  - Jung Ji-hoon as young Lee Yul

An idealistic crown prince who transforms into a low status man after a near fatal accident. Despite his amnesia, Yul maintains the speaking style of a noble man, to the villagers' annoyance and also lands himself in constant trouble because of this. He also retains his intelligence and martial arts skill, especially archery. However, he is completely useless with daily chores and activities of a peasant, such as making straw shoes, using the sickle, and chopping wood.

- Nam Ji-hyun as Yoon Yi-seo / Yeon Hong-shim
  - Heo Jung-eun as young Yoon Yi-seo

An intelligent and strong woman who used to be a noblewoman and now runs Joseon's first all-solution agency in Songjoo village. She is shown to be fiercely independent and crass at times, and is always getting into arguments with Won-deuk. She hides her true identity from everyone in the village, except for her adoptive father. She longs to be reunited with her brother.

- Jo Sung-ha as Kim Cha-eon

The evil vice-premier who is also the father-in-law of Lee Yul. He is the most powerful man in the nation and controls even the king. A ruthless man, he is ready to employ any actions necessary to gain and maintain his power.

- Han So-hee as Kim So-hye
  - Choi Myung-bin as young Kim So-hye

Crown Princess, Kim Cha-eon's daughter and Lee Yul's wife. Like Yul, she is also forced into the marriage and is constantly neglected by her husband. She secretly harbours feelings for Moo-yeon, one of her father's hired killers and the father of the child she becomes pregnant with, causing great distress for her and her father, as she never consummated her marriage with Yul.

- Kim Seon-ho as Jung Jae-yoon

Formerly ranked 7a at the Capital, then Magistrate (6b) of the Songjoo village, then hidden advisor of the Crown Prince. He has a one-sided love for Hong-shim. He has prosopagnosia or "face blindness", which causes him to initially be unable to recognize Won-deuk as the crown prince. The only face that he could recognize is Hong-shim's. He is smart and wise, and is one of the few people to earn Lee Yul's trust.

- Kim Jae-young as Moo-yeon / Yoon Seok-ha
  - Jung Joon-won as young Yoon Seok-ha

Yi-seo's elder brother and Kim Cha-eon's main hired killer. Despite knowing that Cha-eon killed his father, he continues to serve Cha-eon as he is constantly being threatened with the hunting down and killing of his lost sister, Yi-seo. He is shown to be ruthless and amazingly skilled in the martial arts. He is also unafraid to wield his sword and kill anyone Cha-eon instructs him. Despite this, he longs to be free from this lifestyle and bargains with Cha-eon for his release, with one final assignment - to murder the Crown Prince. He is later shown to be heavily conflicted between running away with his sister to start a new life, and being with the Crown Princess with whom he is in love and who is pregnant with his child. He is also conflicted upon learning that the man he has been ordered to kill is now married to his sister.

=== Supporting ===
==== People around Lee Yul ====
- Jo Han-chul as the King

Lee Yul's father who is shown to be a puppet king, ineffective due to being under the vice-premier's control. His relationship with Yul is strained due to the manner in which he seized the throne and the consequences surrounding Yul's mother's death.

- Oh Yeon-ah as Queen Park

Lee Yul's step-mother. She is ambitious and longs for the Crown Prince title to be transferred to her son. It is shown that the King constantly neglects her. She also has a strained relationship with her stepson Lee Yul, and rejoices at the news of his death. She is a constant suspect in any murder attempt on Yul.

- Ji Min-hyuk as Prince Seowon

Lee Yul's younger half-brother, son of Queen Park. Despite his mother's ambition for him, he is a very righteous young man, and does not want to inherit the Crown Prince title using dirty tactics. He is against corruption in the Palace and any attempt to murder his half-brother. He is shown to have feelings for his sister-in-law, the crown princess.

==== People in the Palace ====
- Choi Woong as Jung Sa-yeob

Head of Censorat, elder half-brother of Jung Jae-yoon. He despises Jae-yoon and is annoyed that Jae-yoon manages to climb up the rankings and even become the crown prince's right-hand man all on his own abilities.

- Heo Jung-min as Kim Soo-ji

Ranked 5a at Yejo, Kim Cha-eon's son, Kim So-hye's brother. He is clumsy and weak, and shown to not possess the intelligence and ambitions of his father.

- Jo Hyun-sik as Eunuch Yang

He is in charge of Lee Yul in the Palace. Cha-eon has him killed when he is able to recognise that the dead body in the crown prince's garment is not Lee Yul, but is rescued secretly. He returns to the Palace and continues to serve Lee Yul.

- Kang Young-seok as Gwon Hyeok

A Palace Guards' officer, friend of Jung Jae-yoon.

- Son Kwang-eop as Jang Moon-seok

Kim Cha-eon's right-hand man, Minister of War

==== People in Songjoo Village ====
- Jung Hae-kyun as Mr. Yeon

Hong-sim's adoptive father. He is the only one who knows the truth of Hong-sim's identity and rescues Lee Yul in the woods. To save Hong-sim, he keeps up the ruse that Lee Yul is actually Hong-sim's betrothed, Na Won-deuk, and even buries the clothes in which Yul was found to hide his true identity. Due to his guilt towards Yul, he always takes Yul's side in any of Yul's arguments with Hong-shim. He is a widower whose wife and child died.

- Ahn Suk-hwan as Park Seon-do

Powerful yangban, Kim Cha-eon's subject. He is also involved in corruption and has a vendetta against Hong-shim for rejecting his advances and marriage offer.

- Lee Jun-hyeok as Park Bok-eun

Magistrate's henchman (promoted to Magistrate in Ep. 16). Despite the corruption by his superiors, he is shown to be righteous and has a good relationship with the villagers.

- Lee Min-ji as Kkeut-nyeo

Hong-shim's best friend and Gu-dol's wife due to the marriage decree. They confide in each other often and despite not knowing of Hong-shim's true identity of a noble woman, Kkeut-nyeo is the only person besides Hong-shim's father to know that she was adopted and has an older brother.

- Kim Ki-doo as Gu-dol

Kkeut-nyeo's husband. He also later develops a friendship with Won-deuk and is always there to teach him and give him advice despite finding Won-deuk useless and annoying.

- Jo Jae-ryong as Jo Boo-young, former Magistrate
- Lee Hye-eun as Yang-chun
- Jung Soo-kyo as Ma-chil, a loan shark
- Noh Kang-min as Meok-gu, a child friend of Hong-shim and Won-deuk

==== Others ====
- Lee Seung-hoon as Sin Seung-jo, Right State Councilor
- Park Seon-woo as Lee Don-young
- Lee Seung-joon as Min Yeong-gi, Minister of Rites
- Lee Chae-kyung as Court Lady Kang of Crown Princess' Palace.
- Han Ji-eun as Ae-weol, a gisaeng friend of Jae-yoon

She has feelings for Jae-yoon despite knowing that he only has his heart on Hong-shim. However, she still acts as his trusted confidante and readily assists him in various tasks, even putting her own life at risk. She is shown to be a good artist as her spot on sketch of Won-deuk after spending some time with him under the ruse to look for her missing fan, finally unravels the truth that Lee Yul is alive to Jae-yoon. She constantly visits Jae-yoon at Songjoo Village.

- Lee Seon-hee as Mi-geum, tavern owner
- Keum Chae-an as Song Seon
- Kim Ji-sung as Makgae
- Hong Yoon-jae as Hyuk, assassin #2, Moo-yeon's friend
- Lim Seung-jun as Beom, assassin #3
- Ha Min as Head Court Lady
- Jo Jin-chul
- Eon Rae-ok
- Jo Yeon-woo
- Kim Tae-yeong
- Jung Uk
- Park Chang-seon
- Ji Sung-geun
- Hong Bo-hyang
- Yoon Yeo-heok

=== Special appearances ===
- Jung Ho-bin as Yoon Yi-seo's father (Ep. 1)
- Choi Ji-na as Lee Yul's mother (Ep. 1)
- Do Ji-han as Dong-joo, Crown Prince's best friend and guardian (Ep. 1–2 & 15)
- Ahn Se-ha as Heo Man-shik, King's Royal Inspector (Ep. 5 & 7)
- Jin Ji-hee as Jin Rin, young daughter of the Chinese Envoy (Ep. 13)

== Production ==
- The first script reading took place on March 21, 2018, at CJ E&M Center in Sangam-dong, Seoul, South Korea.
- Filming began in April and ended on September 3.
- Yoon Tae-young was removed from the drama following drunk driving charges.
- Filming took place at KOFIC Namyangju Studios in Namyangju, South Korea.
- The Composer is Jung Se-rin.

== Original soundtrack ==
100 Days My Prince OST

Soundtrack album by Various artists
- Recorded: 2018
- Genre: Soundtrack
- Languages: Korean; English
- Labels: Stone Music Entertainment; Pop Music

=== Part 1 ===
Released on September 11, 2018
No.	Title	Lyrics	Music	Artist	Length
1.	"Erase It" (지워져)	POPKID, Safira.K, Lee Ha-jin	POPKID, Safira.K	Gummy	3:53
2.	"Erase It" (Inst.)		POPKID, Safira.K		3:53
Total length:					7:46

=== Part 2 ===
Released on September 25, 2018
No.	Title	Lyrics	Music	Artist	Length
1.	"For this Love" (이 사랑을)	Yoon Young-joon	Yoon Young-joon	Jinyoung (B1A4)	4:20
2.	"For this Love" (Inst.)		Yoon Young-joon		4:20
Total length:					8:40

=== Part 3 ===
Released on October 16, 2018
No.	Title	Lyrics	Music	Artist	Length
1.	"Cherry Blossom Love Song" (벚꽃연가)	Mathi; Park Keun-cheol; Jung Soo-min	Park Keun-cheol; Jung Soo-min	Chen (EXO)	4:10
2.	"Cherry Blossom Love Song" (Inst.)		Park Keun-cheol; Jung Soo-min		4:10
Total length:					8:20

=== Part 4 ===
Released on October 23, 2018
No.	Title	Lyrics	Music	Artist	Length
1.	"Believe"	Hana	Tom and Jerry	SBGB	3:51
2.	"Believe" (Inst.)		Tom and Jerry		3:51
Total length:					7:42

=== Part 5 ===
Released on October 30, 2018
No.	Title	Lyrics	Music	Artist	Length
1.	"I Will Remember" (기억할테니까)	Park Jong-jin, Jung Won-bo	Park Jong-jin, Jung Won-bo	NeighBro	3:59
2.	"I Will Remember" (Inst.)		Park Jong-jin, Jung Won-bo		3:59
Total length:					7:58

Disc 2:
No.	Title	Artist	Length
1.	"100 days my Prince" (Opening Title)	Kim Jun Seok, Jung Se Rin	2:32
2.	"Crown Prince Yul"	Kim Jun Seok, Jung Se Rin	2:44
3.	"Loads to Carry"	Kim Jun Seok	2:46
4.	"Confusion"	Kim Jun Seok	1:43
5.	"Last Request"	Kim Jun Seok	3:49
6.	"A Great Determination"	Kim Jun Seok	2:34
7.	"Feeling"	Kim Jun Seok	2:20
8.	"The person that I cannot forget"	Jung Se Rin	2:26
9.	"Vanished World"	Jung Se Rin	3:37
10.	"Someone Strikes"	Jung Se Rin	3:11
11.	"I will marry you"	Jung Se Rin	3:51
12.	"Promise under cherry blossom"	Jung Se Rin	2:52
13.	"Finding you in me"	Jung Se Rin	3:36
14.	"Cannot have what i want"	Jung Se Rin	2:02
15.	"Overwhelmed by a longing"	Jung Se Rin	3:38
16.	"100 Days Memory"	Jung Se Rin	3:26
17.	"Songjo-hyun people"	Lee Ruri	2:29
18.	"Lost spinster"	Lee Ruri	2:08
19.	"The enemy of my family"	Lee Ruri	3:01
20.	"Piece of Memory"	Lee Ruri	3:28
21.	"Deepen mind that doesn't fade"	Lee Ruri	2:11
22.	"Won-Deuk's Comeback"	Lee Ruri	2:09
23.	"Flower Rain"	Lee Yun Ji	4:23
24.	"Depose a King"	Lee Yun Ji	2:53
25.	"Back"	Lee Yun Ji	3:08
26.	"Troublemaker Husband"	Lee Yun Ji	2:57
27.	"Amnesia"	Lee Yun Ji	1:39
28.	"Miserable Heart"	Lee Yun Ji	3:57
29.	"Secret"	Lee Yun Ji	1:32
30.	"Scheme"	Lee Yun Ji	2:34
31.	"Greedy Blade"	Joo In Ro	2:59
32.	"Kim Cha-Eon"	BonChoon Koo	4:35
33.	"Assassin"	BonChoon Koo	2:53
34.	"Clue to the Memory"	BonChoon Koo	3:14
35.	"Useless Man"	Noh Yoo Rim	2:09
36.	"Travel Incognito"	Noh Yoo Rim	2:31
37.	"Shallow Trick"	Noh Yoo Rim	2:04
38.	"Present Governor and Oldman Park"	Noh Yoo Rim	2:10
39.	"Deliberate Murder"	Noh Yoo Rim	2:31
40.	"Farewell Forever"	Noh Yoo Rim	2:42
41.	"Conspiracy"	Kim Yun Ju	2:11
42.	"A Strong Suspicion"	Kim Yun Ju	2:40
43.	"Honest Happiness"	Kim Yun Ju	3:27
44.	"Warm Memory"	Yae Rin Soo	3:34
45.	"The Night at the watermill"	Yae Rin Soo	1:59
46.	"This is the Order of a Crown Prince!"	Yae Rin Soo	2:43
47.	"Am I the only one who's feeling uncomfortable?"	Kim Jeong Wan	1:50
48.	"Troubleshooter Hongshim"	Kim Jeong Wan	2:12
49.	"Money eating fool"	Park Hye Min	1:54

In the Philippines, "Hinahanap" sung by Three Two One was released under ABS-CBN Star Music and was the show's theme song.

== Reception ==
=== Viewership ===
100 Days My Prince : South Korea viewers per episode (millions)

Season	Episode number																Average
Season	1	2	3	4	5	6	7	8	9	10	11	12	13	14	15	16	Average
1	1.183	1.373	1.381	1.725	1.098	1.541	1.836	2.168	2.229	2.503	2.307	2.591	2.648	2.877	2.831	3.264	2.097

Source: Audience measurement performed nationwide by Nielsen Media Research.

Average TV viewership ratings
Ep.	Original broadcast date	Average audience share		
Ep.	Original broadcast date	AGB Nielsen		TNmS
Ep.	Original broadcast date	Nationwide	Seoul	Nationwide
1	September 10, 2018	5.026%	5.527%	5.5%
2	September 11, 2018	6.199%	6.882%	5.7%
3	September 17, 2018	6.000%	6.229%	5.9%
4	September 18, 2018	7.274%	7.814%	7.5%
5	September 24, 2018	4.362%	4.799%	4.7%
6	September 25, 2018	6.923%	7.232%	7.2%
7	October 1, 2018	7.991%	8.785%	9.0%
8	October 2, 2018	9.223%	9.995%	8.3%
9	October 8, 2018	9.089%	9.790%	7.8%
10	October 9, 2018	10.263%	10.904%	9.5%
11	October 15, 2018	10.120%	10.790%	9.4%
12	October 16, 2018	11.170%	12.325%	11.0%
13	October 22, 2018	11.333%	12.502%	12.5%
14	October 23, 2018	12.670%	13.455%	12.0%
15	October 29, 2018	12.159%	13.033%	13.0%
16	October 30, 2018	14.412%	15.169%	15.1%
Average		9.013%	9.702%	9.0%
Special	September 4, 2018	1.1%	1.188%	—N/a
Special	November 9, 2018	1.976%	2.233%	—N/a
In the table above, the blue numbers represent the lowest ratings and the red numbers represent the highest ratings.; N/A denotes that the rating is not known.; This drama aired on a cable channel/pay TV which normally has a relatively smaller audience compared to free-to-air TV/public broadcasters (KBS, SBS, MBC and EBS).

=== Big data ===
In the second week of October, drama 100 Days My Prince topped the Good Data Corporation's "Drama TV Topicality Top 10" rankings, after maintaining second place for four consecutive weeks since its premiere. Its lead actors, Do Kyung-soo and Nam Ji-hyun, ranked first and second respectively in the "Drama TV Performer Topicality Top 10". Also entering the top ten were supporting actors Kim Seon-ho (sixth) and Jo Sung-ha (seventh).
