= Music&New =

South Korean record label

MUSIC&NEW
- Industry: contents (music)
- Founded: 2012
- Founder: Kim Woo-taek
- Headquarters: Seoul, South Korea, South Korea
- Area served: Worldwide
- Services: Production, distribution
- Parent: Next Entertainment World
- Website: its-new.co.kr/musicnew.aspx

Music&NEW (stylized MUSIC&NEW; Korean: 뮤직앤뉴), a subsidiary of Next Entertainment World, is a South Korean company that specializes in the production and distribution of music content.

== History ==
MUSIC & NEW is Next Entertainment World's music content distribution division. It started to run its music production and management business in 2012. At now, MUSIC & NEW is focusing on investment and distribution of established potential artists' music and producing divers content through OSMU. In 2012, the company hosted the "i am a musician" project with Soribada, which is a project seeking to find new composers. In the first half year of 2016, MUSIC & NEW was ranked 1st in Production company and 4th in Distribution company in gaon chart Korea. Moreover, Music & New will strengthen its position as a global company. Through partnerships with international labels, MUSIC & NEW will provide a new vision for music distribution services.

== Former artists ==
- Lyn
- Lee Young-hyun
- MC the Max (2012-2016)
- OH!nle (Playground sub-label)
- Sweet Sorrow
- VIBE
- Big Mama
- Sunny Hill (2018-2025)
