= My 19 Year Old Sister-in-Law =

2004 South Korean television series

- Promotional poster
- Also known as: My Sister-in-Law is 19; She is Nineteen
- Hangul: 형수님은 열아홉
- Hanja: 兄嫂님은 열아홉
- RR: Hyeongsunimeun yeorahop
- MR: Hyŏngsunimŭn yŏrahop
- Genre: Romance, Comedy, Drama
- Written by: Jin Soo-wan
- Directed by: Lee Chang-han
- Starring: Jeong Da-bin; Yoon Kye-sang; Kim Jaewon; Kim Min-hee
- Country of origin: South Korea
- Original language: Korean
- No. of episodes: 16

Production
- Executive producer: Lee Jin-suk
- Producer: Goo Bon-geun
- Running time: 60 minutes on Wednesdays and Thursdays at 21:55 (KST)
- Production company: JS Pictures

Original release
- Network: Seoul Broadcasting System
- Release: July 28 – September 23, 2004

My 19 Year Old Sister-in-Law (Korean: 형수님은 열아홉) is a 2004 South Korean television series starring Jeong Da-bin, Yoon Kye-sang, Kim Jaewon and Kim Min-hee. It aired on SBS from July 28 to September 23, 2004, on Wednesdays and Thursdays at 21:55 for 16 episodes.

== Plot ==
The story begins with a car accident involving a man named Jung Joon-seok and it flashes back some scenes of him chasing a young adorable girl, his daughter Jung Hae-won, around the hanging blankets. He was living with his wife, Park Young-ran, Hae-won's mother.

Joon-seok's father, Jung Geun-woo paid off Young-ran to stop looking for Joon-seok and lied that Joon-seok doesn't want to see them. Young-ran tried to catch up to Geun-woo to return the money but failed resulting to her sudden faint because of her illness. The two kitchen helpers, Im Cheong-ok and Song Kyung-hwa, run to rescue Young-ran and while Cheong-ok was pulling Young-ran inside, Kyung-hwa happen to see the envelope which was given by Geun-woo and was shocked to see the amount of money inside.

One night, Cheong-ok was being pursued by some loan sharks and threatened her that they will kill her in front of her sons. She didn't have a choice but to steal the money from Young-ran but was caught red-handed. Young-ran beg her to return because she will return it but due to this, her illness become worst resulting to death. The scene was witnessed by Kyung-Hwa.

Kyung-Hwa made Cheong-ok her accomplice to divide the money and get rid of Hae-won. Cheong-ok refused but Kyung-Hwa threatened her about her killing Hae-won's mother. Kyung-Hwa begs Cheong-ok to do it since it will be for their sons and daughters who are in need to be raise well. Choi Soo-ji, Kyung-Hwa's daughter, overheard about their plan. Soon, Cheong-ok left Hae-won, while carrying a bear given by her father, to a train travelling to Seoul and watches her crying and calling her name. Back to Young-ran's home, Kyung-hwa was busy collecting Young-ran's jewelries. She didn't bother to notice that Soo-ji hid Hae-won's family picture to herself.

15 years later, the now 19-year-old Hae-won, Han Yoo-min lives alone with her adoptive brother, Han Kang-pyo. She has no memory of her childhood and only remembers herself running around the hanging blankets. One day, she meets Kang Min-jae, a doctor who treats her brother, and instantly falls in love. It suddenly turns out that Min-jae is Cheong-ok's eldest son. At the same hospital, Geun-woo was rushed inside and gave words to Joon-seok, who lost his memories after the car accident, to find her daughter 'Hae-won'.

Min-jae wanted to dedicate the wife position to Seo-yeon, the girl who left him without a word a year ago. But because of her mother who keeps pushing him to marry a tycoon's daughter, Min-jae needs Yoo-min help to pretend his fiancée until Seo-yeon return. Yoo-min, who lied to being a 22-year-old woman, decided to tell Min-jae her true age. Min-jae somehows accept her and they renew the contract of if Min-jae will fall in love to Yoo-min before Seo-yeon returns, their engagement will turn to real.

Soon, Yoo-min and Kang-pyo move into Min-jae's house as well as Soo-ji and Kyung-hwa. Soo-ji started to become suspicious of Yoo-min's identity after seeing her teddy bear, which is that she also has the same that is also given by Yoo-min's biological father.

Yoo-min accidentally enters Min-jae's younger brother, Kang Seung-jae's school which is also a school where Soo-ji and Hye-rim is studying. Due to this, Yoo-min and Kang-pyo decided to build up another lie to Soo-ji and Hye-rim.

== Cast ==
- Jeong Da-bin as Han Yoo-min/Jeong Hae-won
- Yoon Kye-sang as Kang Seung-jae
- Kim Jaewon as Kang Min-jae
- Kim Min-hee as Choi Soo-ji
  - Seo Ji-hee as young Choi Soo-ji

Supporting cast

- Seo Ji-hye as Kang Ye-rim, Seung-jae's twin sister
- Heo Jung-min as Han Kang-pyo, Yoo-min's adoptive brother
- Lee Hye-sook as Song Kyung-hwa, Soo-ji's mother
- Park Won-sook as Im Cheong-ok, mother of Min-jae, Seung-jae and Ye-rim
- Lee Bo-hee as Park Young-ran, Yoo-min's mother
- Hong Yo-seob as Jung Joon-seok, Yoo-min's father
- Yoon Joo-sang as Jung Geon-woo, Yoo-min's grandfather
- Kim Seung-min as Tae-woo, Min-jae's friend
- Seo Dong-won as Shin Chang-jo, Seung-jae's housemate
- Im Hyun-kyung as Min Seo-yeon, Min-jae's ex-girlfriend
- Woo Kyung-ah as Chae So-na
- Kang Ye-won

== Remake ==
An Indonesian remake was titled Kakak Iparku 17-Tahun.
