= My Love Patzzi =

2002 South Korean television series

- Promotional poster for My Love Patzzi (L to R: Hee-won, Seung-joon, Song-yee, and Hyun-sung)
- Also known as: My Love, Cindy; My Feisty Girl
- Hangul: 내 사랑 팥쥐
- RR: Nae sarang Patjwi
- MR: Nae sarang P'atchwi
- Genre: Romance; Comedy
- Written by: Kim Yi-young
- Directed by: Lee Jin-suk
- Starring: Jang Na-ra; Kim Rae-won; Kim Jaewon; Hong Eun-hee
- Opening theme: "Sweet Dream" by Jang Na-ra
- Country of origin: South Korea
- Original language: Korean
- No. of episodes: 10

Production
- Production company: JS Pictures

Original release
- Network: Munhwa Broadcasting Corporation
- Release: August 26 – September 24, 2002

My Love, Patzzi (Korean: 내 사랑 팥쥐) is a 2002 South Korean television series starring Jang Na-ra, Kim Rae-won, Kim Jaewon and Hong Eun-hee. It aired on MBC from August 26 to September 24, 2002 on Mondays and Tuesdays at 21:55 for ten episodes.

== Plot ==
This Korean drama is based on the Korean folktale Kongji and Patzzi, and turns it on its ear. The traditional story is somewhat like a Korean version of Cinderella where Kongji is the nice girl who in the end gets the prince, and Patzzi (or Patjwi/Patji) is the hot-tempered and nasty girl that everyone detests (like an evil stepsister).

In this take on the story, Patji, though still hot-tempered, is a kind and caring girl deep down, and Kongji, though she appears to be nice and caring, is actually very nasty and constantly plots to make Patji look bad.

The show starts off with the younger versions of Song-yee (Jang Na-ra), Hee-won (Hong Eun-hee) and Hyun-sung (Kim Rae-won) at elementary school. Song-yee quite obviously likes Hyun-sung, and when Hee-won finds out about it, she tells Song-yee that she will not like the same guy Song-yee likes. Later, during a class exercise, when the teacher asks the children to choose a boy to sit with for the new seating arrangement, Song-yee immediately grabs Hyun-sung's hand. Hyun-sung is startled, but it is Song-yee's turn to be surprised when Hee-won walks right up to the two of them and extends her hand to Hyun-sung. She then kindly states that he doesn't have to go with her if he doesn't want to. Hyun-sung takes a moment, looks at Song-yee who forcefully took his hand, then looks to Hee-won who gently proposed to take his. Making his choice, he breaks away from Song-yee and takes Hee-won's hand. Naturally, Song-yee isn't too happy about this. Furious, she throws her shoe at Hee-won and then proceeds to beat her up.

The show then fast forwards to years later, when the children have grown up.

After a somewhat disastrous school play, Song-yee gets fired from her job. Song-yee, a member of the school staff, has the children perform an altered version of Patji and Kongji, where Patji in fact wins the prince's love after he discovers that Kongji (Kim Jaewon), the pretty one, is manipulative and fake. Turning this classic folk tale upside down upsets the school and the parents, resulting in her being fired. Hee-won, seeing that she needs new employment, helps Song-yee to get a job at the amusement park where she works. (This amusement park is very obviously in many respects modeled after Everland.) There, Song-yee is given the job as a mascot, having to wear a hot suit with a huge head (think Mickey Mouse at Disney World). Song-yee, who is naturally hot-tempered, doesn't enjoy this job too much, and is seen by Hyun-sung (who also works at the amusement park) and his friend, Yang Sam-yeol, bullying some kids after they touched her chest. After an initial chase, they catch her and are surprised to find out she's a girl.

The two boys are waiting for Song-yee after she gets changed into her regular clothes, and Hyun-sung and Song-yee get into a verbal fight. It is then that Hee-won comes up to the both of them, calms them down, and walks off with Song-yee. Hyun-sung pauses for a moment, then remembers Hee-won and chases after them. As he talks with Hee-won, Song-yee realizes who Hyun-sung is and is a little hurt he doesn't remember her, but doesn't have time to dwell on it as Hyun-sung and Hee-won go off to catch up with each other.

It isn't only Hyun-sung who likes Hee-won, though. His friend, Sam-yeol, fell for her at first sight and schemes to make Hee-won fall for him by pretending to like Song-yee. Over the next few days, Hyun-sung and Song-yee continue to have confrontations, though he begins to see a somewhat gentler side of her as she really thinks that Sam-yeol likes her. Needless to say, when she finds out that he only pretended to like her because he wanted Hee-won, she doesn't take it very well and once again decides to unleash her wrath.

While planning to merely do a little damage to a float, she inadvertently causes it to catch on fire as Seung-joon is taking it for a spin. Seeing that he needs help, she ends up saving him and causing him to fall in love with the "angel" who rescued him. He doesn't know who she is, but has her coat and so he uses that to look for her. In addition to winning Seung-joon's affection, Hyun-sung begins to see her in a new light as they eventually become friends. Hee-won, seeing that two men have fallen for Song-yee, proceeds to do what she does best, and tries her hardest to steal Seung-joon from her while making Song-yee look bad in the process, though Seung-joon might be harder to steal than she originally expected. And is Seung-joon the one Song-yee really wants to be with?

== Cast ==
=== Main characters ===
- Jang Na-ra as Yang Song-yee
  - Lee Se-young as young Yang Song-yee

Yang Song-yee is our Patji of the show. She is hot-tempered and does not hide her thoughts. Hence, her forthright personality often brings her loads of trouble as many misunderstandings are caused by her candidness.

- Kim Rae-won as Kim Hyun-sung

Kim Hyun-sung is a seal trainer working at the amusement park. He has a heart problem and hides it from others. Because of this, he vows not to fall in love again, as he thinks that his ill health will bring agony to the other party.

- Kim Jaewon as Kang Seung-joon

Kang Seung-joon is the son of a rich amusement park owner. He falls in love with Song-yee as he thinks that she is a good girl who does not try to hide her real self.

- Hong Eun-hee as Eun Hee-won
  - Park Eun-bin as young Eun Hee-won

Eun Hee-won is the nice, pretty Konji that everybody likes. However, deep down, she is scheming, and tries in many ways to hurt Song-yee.

=== Supporting characters ===
- Kang Rae-yeon as Hwangbo Yu-ri
- Kim Kyung-shik as Yang Sam-yeol/Yoo-bin
- Shin Dong-mi as Noh Ji-young
- Park Kwang-jung as Nam Joo-im
- Heo Jung-min as Moon Seung-man
- Park In-hwan as Pool technician
- Kim Ji-young
