= Sunflower (2006 film) =

- Theatrical poster
- Hangul: 해바라기
- RR: Haebaragi
- MR: Haebaragi
- Directed by: Kang Seok-beom
- Written by: Kang Seok-beom
- Produced by: Jeon Ho-jin; Jeon Jae-sun
- Starring: Kim Rae-won; Kim Hae-sook
- Cinematography: Kim Woo-jae
- Edited by: Hahm Sung-won
- Music by: Angelo Lee
- Production companies: DCG Plus; Ivision Entertainment
- Distributed by: Showbox
- Release date: 23 November 2006
- Running time: 117 minutes
- Country: South Korea
- Language: Korean
- Budget: $3.3 million
- Box office: $8.22 million

Sunflower (Korean: 해바라기; RR: Haebaragi) is a 2006 South Korean action thriller film directed by Kang Seok-beom. This action with full drama starring by Kim Rae-won and Kim Hae-sook .

== Premise ==
Former gangster Tae-sik is released from prison and heads back to his hometown to live in a small restaurant with a woman. Attempting to leave his past behind, he takes a job in a garage and tries to keep away from the local gangs, most of whom still live in fear of his brutal reputation. When a local politician wants to knock down his adoptive mom's restaurant to build a new shopping mall, Tae-sik struggles to avoid returning to a life of violence.

== Cast ==
- Kim Rae-won as Oh Tae-sik
- Kim Hae-sook
- Heo Yi-jae
- Kim Byeong-ok
- Kim Jung-tae as Yang-ki
- Han Jung-soo
- Ji Dae-han
- Park Sung-woong
- Park Cheol-ho

== Release ==
Sunflower was released in South Korea on 23 November 2006, and topped the box office on its opening weekend with 267,065 admissions. It held the number-one spot for a second consecutive weekend, and went on to receive a total of 1,543,429 admissions, with a gross (as of 7 January 2007) of US$8,221,999.
