= Big Mama (group) =

South Korean girl group

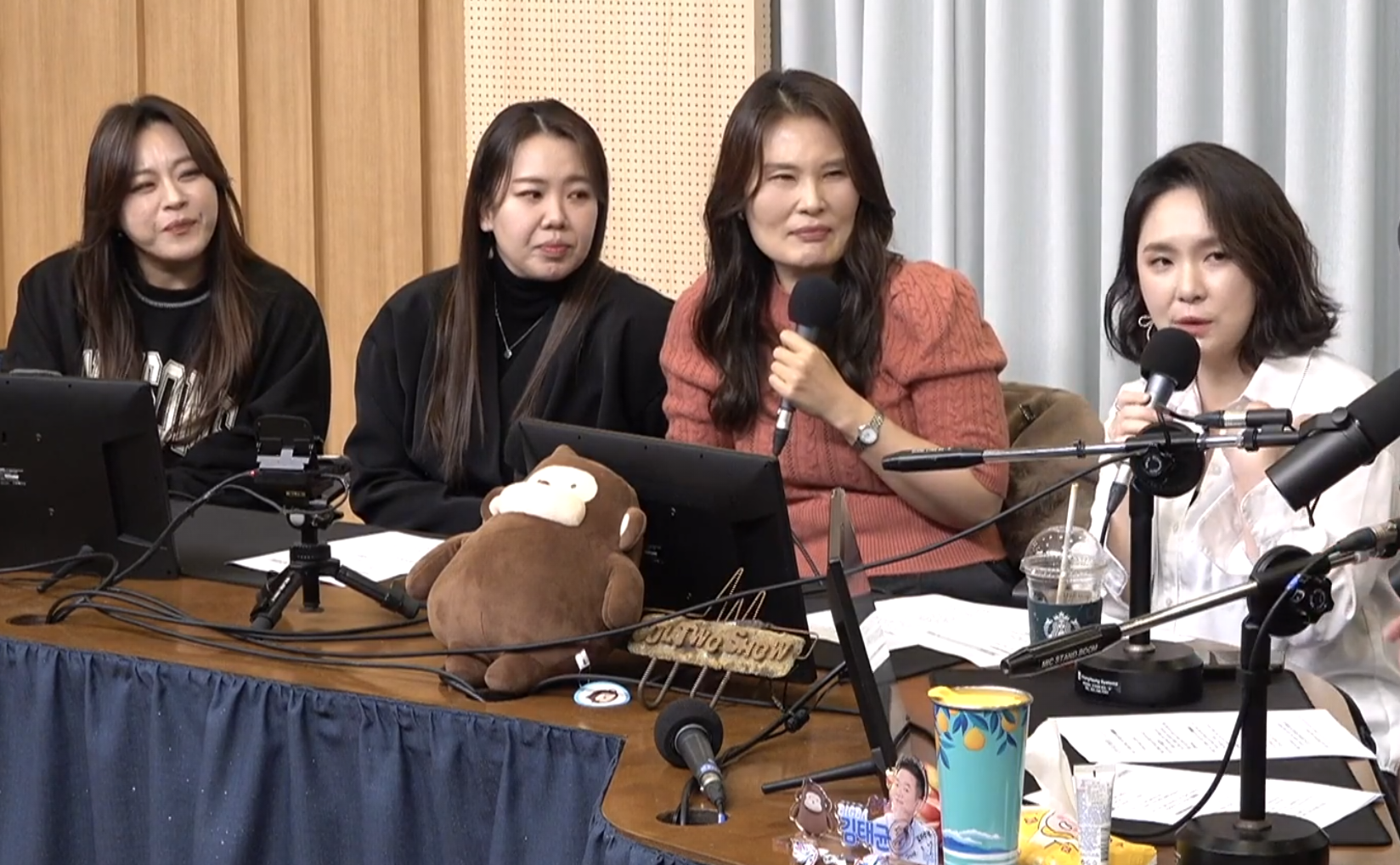
- Big Mama in December 2023; L–R: Lee Young-hyun, Park Min-hye, Shin Yeon-ah and Lee Ji-young.

Background information
- Origin: South Korea
- Genres: Gospel; pop; R&B; soul
- Years active: 2003–2012; 2021–present
- Labels: Taillrunsmedia (태일런스미디어); YG; Music&New; Kakao
- Members: Shin Yeon-ah; Lee Ji-young; Lee Young-hyun; Park Min-hye

Big Mama (Korean: 빅마마) is a South Korean female group that debuted in 2003. The group focused on its members' singing abilities rather than their looks. The group went on hiatus in 2012 after their song "Cleaning My Closet". The group reunited on June 24, 2021 with their digital single "One More Day", ending their 9 year hiatus.

As of 2026, the group has currently released six studio albums, two cover albums and 18 singles.

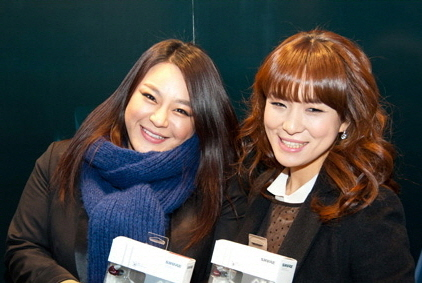
In 2017

== Members ==
- Shin Yona (신연아, 申然雅)
- Lee Ji-young (이지영)
- Lee Young-hyun (이영현)
- Park Min-hye (박민혜)

== Discography ==
=== Studio albums ===
Title	Album details	Peak chart positions		Sales
Title	Album details	KOR RIAK	KOR Gaon	Sales
Like the Bible	Released: February 6, 2003; Label: YG Entertainment; Formats: CD, cassette	11	—	KOR: 338,389
It's Unique	Released: May 17, 2005; Label: YG Entertainment; Formats: CD, cassette	3	—	KOR: 163,442
For The People	Released: October 12, 2006; Label: YG Entertainment; Formats: CD, cassette	6	99	KOR: 37,342
Blossom	Released: October 2, 2007; Label: Manwaldang; Formats: CD, cassette	—	—	—N/a
5	Released: March 23, 2010; Label: Music&New; Formats: CD, digital download	—N/a	3	—N/a
Born	Released: February 10, 2022; Label: Kakao Entertainment; Formats: CD, digital download	—N/a	90	—N/a

=== Cover albums ===
Title	Album details	Peak chart positions	Sales
Title	Album details	KOR RIAK	Sales
Big Mama's Gift	Released: November 24, 2005; Label: YG Entertainment; Formats: CD, cassette	7	KOR: 21,336
For The Christmas	Released: November 28, 2006; Label: YG Entertainment; Formats: CD, cassette	22	KOR: 6,948

=== Singles ===
Title	Year	Peak chart positions	Sales	Album
Title	Year	KOR Circle	Sales	Album
"Break Away"	2003	—		Like The Bible
"Resignation" (체념)	2003	—		Like The Bible
"Woman" (여자)	2005	—		It's Unique
"Sori" (소리)	2005	—		It's Unique
"Jingle Bell Rock"	2005	—		Big Mama's Gift
"Never Mind"	2006	—		For The People
"Winter Child" (겨울아이)	2006	—		For The Christmas
"Betrayal" (배반)	2007	—		Blossom
"Money..? Honey..?"	2008	—		Non-album singles
"Happy Birthday to You"	2008	—		Non-album singles
"Just One Day" (하루만)	2010	5	KOR: 1,116,001	5
"Crazy For" (기다리다 미쳐)	2010	6	KOR: 926,229	5
"Never" (절대)	2010	23		Non-album singles
"I Love You" (사랑해요)	2011	39	KOR: 308,258	Non-album singles
"Cleaning Out the Drawer" (서랍정리)	2012	15	KOR: 325,435	Non-album singles
"One Day More" (하루만 더)	2021	15		Born
"Like Nothing Happened" (아무렇지 않은 척)	2022	96		Born
"Happy Me" (행복한 나를)	2023	170		Non-album single

== Awards and nominations ==
Award ceremony	Year	Category	Nominee / work	Result	Ref.
Golden Disc Awards	2003	Best New Artist	"Break Away"	Won	
Golden Disc Awards	2003	Best Music Video	"Break Away"	Won	
KBS Music Awards	2005	Singer of the Year (Bonsang)	Big Mama	Won	
KMTV Korean Music Awards	2003	Best New Artist	Big Mama	Won	
Korea Broadcasting Producer Awards	2006	Singer of the Year	Big Mama	Won	
Korean Music Awards	2004	Musician of the Year (Grand Prize)	Big Mama	Won	
Korean Music Awards	2004	Rookie of the Year	Big Mama	Nominated	
Korean Music Awards	2004	Album of the Year	Like The Bible	Nominated	
Korean Music Awards	2004	Best R&B Album	Like The Bible	Nominated	
Korean Music Awards	2006	Best R&B and Soul Song	"Sori"	Nominated	
MBC Gayo Daejejeon	2003	Top Ten Artist	Big Mama	Won	
Mnet Asian Music Awards	2003	Music Video of the Year (Grand Prize)	"Break Away"	Won	
Mnet Asian Music Awards	2003	Best New Artist	"Break Away"	Won	
Mnet Asian Music Awards	2003	Best R&B Performance	"Break Away"	Nominated	
Mnet Asian Music Awards	2005	Best Female Group	"Woman"	Nominated	
Mnet Asian Music Awards	2007	Best Female Group	"Betrayal"	Nominated	
SBS Gayo Daejeon	2003	Best New Artist	Big Mama	Won	
Seoul Music Awards	2003	Best New Artist	Big Mama	Won	
