= Kongjwi and Patjwi =

Korean romance story

Kongjwi and Patjwi (Korean: 콩쥐 팥쥐, also romanized as "Kongji and Patzzi") is a traditional Korean romance story from the Joseon Dynasty. It is the story of humble Kongji's triumph over adversity. The moral of the story is that virtuous people who think positively and work diligently will be happy, encapsulating the Western proverb "heaven helps those who help themselves."

== Plot summary ==
A childless couple was blessed with a very beautiful baby girl, whom they named Kongji. Her mother died when Kongjwi was 100 days old. She grew up with her father. The man remarried again when Kongji was fourteen years old. To replace his wife, he found a cruel widow who had a very ugly daughter named Patjwi. Her father eventually died. From that time onwards, the stepmother and Patjwi treated Kongjwi very unfairly. They starved her, dressed her in rags, and forced her to do all the dirtiest work in the house.

One day, the stepmother forced Kongjwi to plow a field with a wooden hoe. The hoe soon broke, leaving Kongjwi in tears, for fear that her stepmother would beat her again. A cow appeared and comforted her. He plowed the field in her place and sent Kongjwi home with a basket of apples, a gift from the cow. Her stepmother accused her of stealing the apples, gave the entire basket to Patjwi, and refused to give Kongjwi her supper.

The next day, the stepmother gave Kongjwi an enormous pot with a hole in the bottom and told her she must fill it with water before she and Patjwi returned home from town. Kongjwi kept bringing baskets of water, but the pot was never filled. The water leaked out from the hole. A tortoise appeared and blocked the hole for her. With his help, Kongjwi filled the pot with water. The stepmother was even angrier. She spanked Kongjwi black and blue.

After a time, the Magistrate announced that he was looking for a wife. A dance would be given in his honor and every maiden was to attend. Kongjwi and Patjwi were invited. The stepmother was hopeful that Patjwi would be the lucky one, but afraid that Kongjwi would spoil her own daughter's chance. Before they left, the stepmother gave Kongjwi a huge sack of rice to hull, which she had to accomplish before they returned from the dance. Kongjwi asked for help from the heavens, and a flock of sparrows appeared and hulled the rice. A Celestial maiden came down from heaven and dressed Kongjwi in a beautiful gown and a delicate pair of colorful shoes. She was transported to the palace by four men in a magnificent palanquin. Kongjwi hurried towards the dance.

Everyone admired her because of her beauty. The Magistrate went to her to ask her name. But when Kongjwi saw her stepmother and stepsister among the guests, she fled in terror. Patjwi remarked to her mother that the strange girl looked like her Kongjwi. As Kongjwi crossed a bridge, she tripped. One of her shoes fell into the stream. The Magistrate found the shoe and vowed to marry the woman it belonged to. Servants tried the shoe on every woman in the land until they arrived in Kongjwi's village. It fit no one except Kongjwi. She was the last to try the shoe. Then, she produced her clothes and the other pair of her shoes. The Magistrate and Kongjwi were married.

Patjwi was jealous of Kongjwi's marriage and drowned her in a river. Patjwi disguised herself as Kongjwi to live with the Magistrate. Kongjwi's spirit would haunt anyone in the river. A brave man confronted her ghost and she told him everything. The man reported this to the Magistrate, and the Magistrate went into the river. Instead of a dead body, he retrieved a golden lotus. He kissed the lotus and it turned into Kongjwi.

The Magistrate sentenced Patjwi to be in jail, and she was killed and cooked into sauce. The stepmother, thinking it was Kongjwi's gift, ate it, until she realized it was Patjwi's dead body, she yelled so loudly until she died. Kongjwi and Magistrate lived happily ever after. The moral of this story is that those who are kind and persevering shall be rewarded.

== Analysis ==
The legend of Kongji and Patjwi was passed down orally for many generations before it was first recorded, producing numerous regional variations. For example, some versions of the story cast a frog in place of the turtle as Kongji's helper, while others have been reduced to the Cinderella-esque first portion. Although the first part of the story shares elements with the Western fairy tale Cinderella, the traditional Korean belief of kwon seon jing ak (권선징악), the importance of encouraging virtue and punishing vice, pervades the traditional tale coming to fruition with the deserved deaths of Kongji's stepmother and stepsister in the second part of the story.

=== Tale type ===
The tale shares similarities with the more general tale type ATU 510, "The Persecuted Heroine", of the international system of Aarne–Thompson–Uther Index (to which Cinderella belongs), but merits its own classification in the Korean tale index as type KT 450.

According to Sinologist Boris L. Riftin, unlike European variants of Cinderella, wherein the princess marries the prince and the tale ends, Asian variants (which include those from China and Southeast Asia) segue into the revenge of the stepfamily and the heroine's replacement by her stepsister. In the second part of the story, states Ding Naitong, the heroine goes through a cycle of transformations (bird/tree/object), until she regains human form at an old woman's house.

== Setting ==
Although the story itself contains fantastic elements, its setting is believed to be the real-life village of Dunsan, Keumgu Township, Gimje-si (김제시 금구면 둔산마을). Both Dunsan village and the village in which the novel Kongji and Patzzi is set are shaped like a cow. The turtle which blocked the hole in Kongji's pot is associated with Dunsan's turtle rock. People say that Kongji dropped her shoes in Duwol (두월) brook outside Dunsan.

== Adaptations ==
=== Opera ===
Composer: Kim Dai-Hyun (1917 ~), 『 Kongji Patji 』 4 Acts First Performance :1951. 12. 20. Busan Theater. Length : 2hours 30minutes

=== Music ===
- "Heavy-metal Kongji" by Cherry Filter

=== Film ===
- Kongjwi Patjwi (1958), directed by Yun Bong-Chun.
- Kongjwi Patjwi (1967), directed by Jo Keung-Ha.
- Kongjwi and Patjwi (1977), directed by Kang Tae-ung (stop motion version)

=== Television ===
- My Love Patzzi (2006–2007), produced by Lee Jin-Suk
- All My Love (2010–2011), produced by Kwon Ik Joon
