= Jeong Da-bin =

South Korean actress (1980–2007)

- 정다빈
- Jeong in 2006
- Born: Jeong Hye-sun; March 4, 1980; Seongnam, South Korea
- Died: February 10, 2007 (aged 26); Seoul, South Korea
- Cause of death: Suicide by hanging
- Resting place: Cheonga Park, Goyang, South Korea
- Other name: Jung Da-bin
- Occupations: Actress; dancer
- Years active: 2000–2007
- Notable work: Cats on the Roof

Korean name
- Hangul: 정혜선
- Hanja: 鄭惠善
- RR: Jeong Hyeseon
- MR: Chŏng Hyesŏn

Stage name
- Hangul: 정다빈
- Hanja: 鄭多彬
- RR: Jeong Dabin
- MR: Chŏng Tabin

Jeong Da-bin (Korean: 정다빈; March 4, 1980 – February 10, 2007) was a South Korean actress. Best known for the popular television series Cats on the Roof (2003), she died from suicide in 2007 at the age of 26.

== Career ==
Born Jeong Hye-seon in Seongnam, Gyeonggi Province, she studied Theater and Film at Dongguk University. Using the stage name Jeong Da-bin, she made her acting debut in 2000 in The Legend of Gingko. This was followed by minor and supporting roles in television dramas, and as part of the ensemble cast in the sitcom Nonstop.

In 2003, Jeong's acting breakthrough would come in Cats on the Roof. Depicting a boy and a girl platonically living together then falling in love (with cohabitation at the time a taboo topic in the South Korean mainstream), the series was a success, especially popular among teenagers and those in their early to mid 20s.

Jeong became known for her cheerful and positive image, and in 2004 having starred in her first film, the romantic comedy He Was Cool alongside Song Seung-heon, based on the internet novel by Guiyeoni. She then returned to television, starring with Yoon Kye-sang in My 19 Year Old Sister-in-Law. In 2005, That Summer's Typhoon, which co-starred Han Ye-seul, would be her final acting role, although it did not perform well.

== Subsequent depression and death ==
On February 10, 2007, Jeong was found hanged with a bath towel in the bathroom of her boyfriend's house in Samseong-dong, Gangnam District, southern Seoul. Her boyfriend, identified by his surname Lee, said he took Jeong back to his house because she got drunk while socializing with friends at a nearby bar in Cheongdam-dong. Lee, who discovered her body at 7:50 a.m. and called the police, said the actress had been recently depressed due to a lack of work, the imprisonment of her previous manager, and malicious attacks on the Internet about her physical appearance. Lee also said Jeong first attempted suicide by slitting her wrist between September and October 2006. Her talent agency disputed this, claiming her wrist scar was the result of an accident that occurred in her first year of high school. Suspecting foul play, her family and agency requested an investigation, and the postmortem concluded that it was suicide.

Although no apparent suicide note was left behind, Jeong had posted her thoughts on her personal blog on Cyworld just a day prior to her death. Under the title "The End" (or "Finished"), she wrote:

Everything is so complicated. I get angry for no reason and I feel like I'm going crazy. It hurts so much that I feel like I'm getting seasick. My head hurts so much that I start to tear. I was becoming a slave to my temper. I thought that I was losing myself, losing my identity. Then, as if lightning had struck, all became quiet. The Lord came to me with love. He made me realize my importance and gave me courage. I was about to collapse, and he lifted me up, saying it's going to be okay. YES, I WILL BE OKAY.

She was cremated, and her remains placed at Cheonga Park in Ilsan, Gyeonggi Province. Jeong's death, which was shortly after singer U;Nee's suicide in January 2007, sent shock waves throughout South Korea and sparked concern over copycat suicides.

== Filmography ==
=== Television drama ===
- Money.com (SBS, 2000)
- The Full Sun (KBS2, 2000)
- New Nonstop (MBC, 2001)
- KBS TV Novel "Hongeo" (KBS1, 2001)
- How Should I Be? (MBC, 2001)
- Trio (2002)
- Nonstop 3 (MBC, 2003)
- Cats on the Roof (MBC, 2003)
- My 19 Year Old Sister-in-Law (SBS, 2004)
- That Summer's Typhoon (SBS, 2005)

=== Film ===
- The Legend of Gingko (2000)
- He Was Cool (2004)

=== Music video appearance ===
- Baek Ji-young – "I Won't Love" (2006)

== Awards ==
- 2002 MBC Entertainment Awards: Top Excellence Award, Actress in a Sitcom/Comedy (New Nonstop)
- 2003 MBC Drama Awards: Best New Actress (Cats on the Roof)
- 2004 SBS Drama Awards: New Star Award (My 19 Year Old Sister-in-Law)

== See also ==
- Suicide in South Korea
