= Which Star Are You From =

2006 South Korean television drama

- Promotional poster
- Also known as: What Star Did You Come From?; Which Planet Are You From?
- Hangul: 넌 어느 별에서 왔니
- RR: Neon eoneu byeoreseo wanni
- MR: Nŏn ŏnŭ pyŏresŏ wanni
- Genre: Romance; Comedy; Drama
- Written by: Jung Yoo-kyung
- Directed by: Pyo Min-soo; Han Joo-seok
- Starring: Kim Rae-won; Jung Ryeo-won
- Country of origin: South Korea
- Original language: Korean
- No. of episodes: 16

Production
- Producer: Han Hee
- Running time: 60 minutes
- Production company: Kim Jong-hak Production

Original release
- Network: Munhwa Broadcasting Corporation
- Release: March 13 – May 2, 2006

Which Star Are You From (Korean: 넌 어느 별에서 왔니; RR: Neon eoneu byeoreseo wanni) is a South Korean romantic comedy television series, starring Kim Rae-won and Jung Ryeo-won. It aired on MBC from March 13 to May 2, 2006 on Mondays and Tuesdays at 21:55 (KST) for 16 episodes.

== Plot ==
Kim Rae-won plays Choi Seung-hee, a young director who just made a successful international film debut. Following his success in Australia, he meets the girl of his dreams, Lee Hye-su (Jung Ryeo-won), an aspiring musician. After spending a lovestruck romp on Australia, they planned to get married. Hye-su, however, discovers her mother does not approve of Choi. Driving to eat out one day, Seung-hee suddenly proposes to Hye-su, and while putting the ring on her finger, Seung-hee careens wildly on the road to get out the way of a truck. The accident causes Lee's death. Choi then spends the next three years in seclusion, drinking and holing himself up in his apartment.

Han Jeong-hoon (Park Si-hoo), who runs a film company, urges Director Kim to finish his grieving and to start working on film again. Choi pulls all his energy to push Hye-su out of his thoughts. On the day he decided to go out and to continue working, he sees a young woman at the sidewalk who looked exactly like his beloved Hye-su. Struck by the utter similarity, he starts to follow the girl to her hometown, which turned out to be a far-flung province. The girl, named Kim Bok-shil (also played by Jung Ryeo-won), realizing Choi had nowhere else to stay for the night, offers her home as an inn. Being poor, she considers all opportunities a chance to get good money.

After spending the night at the fake inn, the two also spends the morning together searching for fresh mountain water and encountering a wild boar in the process. Choi does not reveal his identity to Kim, and Kim mistakes him for a bum waiting to pass a long overdue exam. While walking on the countryside, Choi is inspired by the beauty of his surroundings and gets ready to prepare for his next film. He then returns to Seoul and later comes back to Kim's village to shoot. They see each other again, and Bok-shil realizes Seung-hee is a renowned director. Bok-shil then positions herself as a rice-server for the crew and comes to the set every day. By a stroke of luck, Han Jeong-hoon, also on the set, absent-mindedly offers Bok-shil a job at the film company. Jeong-hoon is also struck by the similarity of Bok-shil and Hye-su.

Bok-shil starts work in Seoul as an assistant for Director Choi. In the hopes of saving enough money for her mother's surgery, Bok-shil braves the demands of her work despite her clumsy and awkward ways. Seung-hee finds himself being attracted to Bok-shil because of her face, initially, and then later on because of her unique charm and humor.

Hye-su's family, by chance, sees Bok-shil and realizes she is the long lost sister of Hye-su. Hye-su's mother, determined not to lose another daughter, runs an investigation to find out Bok-shil's real identity. Proving that Bok-shil is really Lee Hye-rim, her lost younger daughter, she pleads Bok-shil/Hye-rim to leave her rural life and adopted mother to embrace her true lineage. Through Yoon Mi-hyeon (Kang Jeong-hwa), the film company's music director who turned to be her cousin, Bok-shil realizes she is the sister of Hye-su, Director Choi's former girlfriend. She is now conflicted on how to tell the truth to Seung-hee, who is now also falling for her. After the initial shock and confusion, Seung-hee was able to overcome his fears and admits he is in love with Hye-rim as Kim Bok-shil. Bok-shil's real mother, pained yet again due to her younger daughter's choice, becomes determined to put an end to the relationships. Her hate for the director has come full-circle, and Choi now has the chance to do what he wasn't able to do for Hye-su.

== Cast ==
- Jung Ryeo-won as Kim Bok-shil/Lee Hye-su/Lee Hae-rim
- Kim Rae-won as Choi Seung-hee
- Park Si-hoo as Han Jeong-hoon
- Kang Jeong-hwa as Yoon Mi-hyeon
- Im Ye-jin as Kim Soon-ok (Bok-shil's mom)
- Ok Ji-young as Jung Sun-jung (Bok-shil's friend)
- Kim Ha-kyun as Jo Doo-sik
- Lee Bo-hee as Ahn Jin-hee (Hye-su's mom)
- Song Jae-ho as Lee Young-noh
- Lee Young-ha as Choi Soo-il (Seung-hee's dad)
- Park Chul-ho as Park Chan-ho (Seung-hee's upperclassman)

== International airings ==
Which Star Are You From aired in the Philippines on ABS-CBN's Primetime Bida line up from May 28 to August 3, 2007, replacing Maging Sino Ka Man and was replaced by Kokey.
