= My Little Bride =

- Theatrical release poster
- Hangul: 어린 신부
- Hanja: 어린 新婦
- RR: Eorin sinbu
- MR: Ŏrin sinbu
- Directed by: Kim Ho-jun
- Written by: Yoo Soon-il
- Produced by: Choi Soon-shik
- Starring: Kim Rae-won; Moon Geun-young
- Cinematography: Seo Jeong-min
- Edited by: Park Soon-deok
- Music by: Choi Soon-shik; Choi Man-shik
- Distributed by: Korea Pictures
- Release date: April 2, 2004
- Running time: 115 minutes
- Country: South Korea
- Language: Korean

My Little Bride (Korean: 어린 신부; RR: Eorin sinbu) is a 2004 South Korean romantic comedy film about a teenage girl (Moon Geun-young) who tries to continue her normal social and school life, after her grandfather forces her into an arranged marriage with a man in his twenties (Kim Rae-won). With 3,149,500 tickets sold, it was the second most popular domestic film at the Korean box office in 2004 (behind blockbuster Taegukgi), and fourth most popular overall.

My Little Bride is a Korean remake of the 2002 Hong Kong film My Wife Is 18, starring Charlene Choi and Ekin Cheng.

== Plot ==
Bo-eun (Moon Geun-young) is an ordinary 15-year-old high school girl who worries about grades and has a crush on her school's baseball team ace, Jung-woo. One day, Bo-eun's grandfather orders her to marry Sang-min (Kim Rae-won) because of a pact he made with Sang-min's grandfather during the Korean War. Despite the grandchildren's opposition, they are forced to marry because of Bo-eun's grandfather's strong influence. However, later on in the story, it is revealed that Sang-min actually loves Bo-eun. Bo-eun's undercover married life begins: She pretends that she doesn't have a husband and starts dating Jung-woo. And her only best friend cannot help but to be envious of Bo-eun as she also has a crush on Jung-woo. But Bo-eun believes that she can manage both men and live a double life. Everything goes smoothly until Sang-min becomes an art teacher at Bo-eun's school and the duo have to try to keep their marriage a secret. From there, their relationship begins to grow. After an incident, Bo-eun's family finds out about Jung-woo. After talking to her mother, Bo-eun finally realizes that she loves Sang-min. At the school festival she breaks up with Jung-woo and confesses her feelings to Sang-min in front of the whole school.

== Cast ==
- Kim Rae-won as Sang-min
- Moon Geun-young as Bo-eun
- Park Jin-woo as Lee Jung-woo
- Shin Se-kyung as Hye-won, Bo-eun's friend
- Ahn Sun-young as Teacher Kim
- Kim Bo-kyung as Ji-soo
- Kim In-moon as Bo-eun's grandfather
- Song Ki-yoon as Bo-eun's father
- Sunwoo Eun-sook as Bo-eun's mother
- Han Jin-hee as Sang-min's father
- Kim Hye-ok as Sang-min's mother
- Yoon Chan as Yong-joo
- Ryu Deok-hwan as Dong-goo
- Kim Han as Young-chul

== Soundtrack ==
1. Childhood memories
2. My Love - Shim Eun-jin
3. Sad gratitude
4. Happy Time
5. Flirt
6. Sad Sang-min
7. Look at me - Park Se-ryung
8. First love
9. I don't know about love yet - Moon Geun-young
10. Mural of love
11. Shopping center
12. Letter
13. The clown is laughing at me - 공주파 3인
14. Confession at the auditorium
15. Epilogue
16. I don't know about love yet - Kim Hye-jin
17. I don't know about love yet - Jeon Woo-joo
18. I don't know about love yet (Inst.)
19. My Love (Inst.)

== Release ==
My Little Bride was released in South Korea on April 2, 2004. In the Philippines, the film was released by Korea Pictures with a Tagalog dub on November 23, 2005.

== Accolades ==
Year	Award	Category	Recipient	Result
2004	6th Mnet Asian Music Awards	Best OST	"I Don't Know About Love Yet" by Moon Geun-young	Nominated
2004	41st Grand Bell Awards	Best New Actor	Kim Rae-won	Won
2004	41st Grand Bell Awards	Best New Actress	Moon Geun-young	Won
2004	41st Grand Bell Awards	Popularity Award	Moon Geun-young	Won
2004	12th Chunsa Film Art Awards	Best New Actress	Moon Geun-young	Won
2004	25th Blue Dragon Film Awards	Popular Star Award	Moon Geun-young	Won
2004	3rd Korean Film Awards	Best New Actress	Moon Geun-young	Nominated
2005	41st Baeksang Arts Awards	Most Popular Actor (Film)	Kim Rae-won	Nominated
