= Yoon Tae-young =

South Korean actor (born 1974)

- Born: October 3, 1974 (age 52); Yeongcheon, South Korea
- Education: Illinois Wesleyan University - Business Administration
- Occupation: Actor
- Years active: 1996–present
- Agent: SM C&C
- Spouse: Im Yoo-jin (m. 2007)
- Children: 1 daughter

Korean name
- Hangul: 윤태영
- Hanja: 尹泰榮
- RR: Yun Taeyeong
- MR: Yun T'aeyŏng

Yoon Tae-young (Korean: 윤태영; born October 3, 1974) is a South Korean actor. He is best known for starring in television dramas, notably fantasy epic The Legend (2007) and sports drama/romance Strike Love (2009).

== Personal life ==
Yoon married actress Im Yoo-jin on February 14, 2007. They met on the 2003 TV drama On the Prairie.

He is the only son of former Samsung Electronics vice chairman Yoon Jong-yong.

=== Drunk driving incident ===
On May 13, 2018, Yoon crashed into another car while driving under the influence of alcohol. Yoon was called in the next day to the police station where the police determined that his blood alcohol content was 0.140 percent at the time of the accident. The police suspended his licenses, and after the news broke out, producers of the then upcoming TV series 100 Days My Prince announced their intent to replace him with another actor.

== Filmography ==
=== Television series ===
- The Escape of the Seven (2023)
- Local Hero (2016)
- KBS Drama Special – "The Final Puzzle" (2014)
- Diary of a Night Watchman (2014)
- The King's Daughter, Soo Baek-hyang (2013–2014)
- Midnight Hospital (2011)
- Strike Love (2009)
- The Legend (2007)
- Special Crime Investigation: Murder in the Blue House (2006)
- Pearl Necklace (2003–2004)
- On the Prairie (2003)
- Nothing Better and Nothing Worse (2002)
- Successful Story of a Bright Girl (2002)
- MBC Best Theater – "A Chance" (2002)
- Everyday With You (2001–2002)
- Sun-hee and Jin-hee (2001)
- Her House (2001)
- Hotelier (2001)
- Jump (1999)
- Wang Cho (The Boss) (1999)
- Michiko (1999)
- I Love You, I Love You (1997)
- Beautiful My Lady (1997)

=== Film ===
- Mr. Socrates (2005)
- Never to Lose (2005)
- Dream of a Warrior (2001)

=== Variety show ===
- Survival Quiz of God (jTBC, 2013) - MC
- Golf King (TV Chosun, 2022) - Cast Member; Season 3

== Awards ==
- 2012 한일문화대상: Cultural Diplomacy recipient
- 2011 MBC Drama Awards: Special Award (Midnight Hospital)
- 2003 39th Baeksang Arts Awards: Most Popular Actor (TV)
- 2002 38th Baeksang Arts Awards: Most Popular Actor (TV)
- 2000 36th Baeksang Arts Awards: Best New Actor (TV) (The Boss)
- 1999 MBC Drama Awards: Best New Actor (The Boss)
