= Mr. Socrates =

- Theatrical poster
- Hangul: 미스터 소크라테스
- RR: Miseuteo Sokeurateseu
- MR: Misŭt'ŏ Sok'ŭrat'esŭ
- Directed by: Choi Jin-won
- Written by: Choi Jin-won
- Produced by: Kim Sang-oh; Choi Yong-gi
- Starring: Kim Rae-won; Kang Shin-il; Lee Jong-hyuk; Yoon Tae-young; Park Sung-woong
- Cinematography: Jin Yong-hwan
- Edited by: Park Gok-ji
- Music by: Sung Ki-wan
- Distributed by: Lotte Entertainment
- Release date: November 10, 2005
- Running time: 109 minutes
- Country: South Korea
- Language: Korean
- Box office: US$6,380,076

Mr. Socrates (Korean: 미스터 소크라테스) is a 2005 South Korean crime film.

== Plot ==
Asking for money to his father imprisoned in jail, threatening a friend who became a murderer by mistake, stealing money from his friends... Ku Dong-hyuk (Kim Rae-won) is the worst scumbag you can ever imagine. Living a low-life like a street dog, one day, Dong-hyuk gets kidnapped by a mysterious gang. Being captured out of no reason, the gang trains Dong-hyuk in a secret and inhumane way repeatedly. Dong-hyuk tries to escape but fails, which makes the training more harsh and cruel than before. After finishing all the training, the gang orders Dong-hyuk to become a police detective as their secret connection.

== Cast ==
- Kim Rae-won as Ku Dong-hyuk
- Kang Shin-il as Beom-pyo
- Lee Jong-hyuk as Lieutenant Shin
- Yoon Tae-young as Lawyer Cho
- Park Sung-woong as Han-doo
