= Kkangpae =

Term for Korean street gangs

Kkangpae (Korean: 깡패) is a romanization of the Korean word that is commonly translated to 'gangster' or 'thug'. The term is commonly used to refer to members of unorganized street gangs. By contrast, members of organized crime gangs are called geondal (건달) or jopok (Korean: 조폭; Hanja: 組暴; Abbreviation of 조직폭력배; 組織暴力輩).

Criminal gangs have featured in South Korean popular culture, including films and television, over the past decades.

== History ==
The Korean mafia may have been established in the 19th century, towards the end of the Joseon dynasty, with the rise of commerce and the emergence of investment from European colonial powers. At this time, pre-existing street gangs, which were largely lower-class but operated by wealthy merchants, gained greater influence. The modern history of Korean criminal organizations can be divided into four periods: the Colonial era, the political mobs of the 1950s and early 1960s under president Syngman Rhee, the Civil War period under the military rule of Park Chung Hee and Chun Doo-hwan, and the present era.

=== 1910–1945: Colonial era ===
During the 35 years when Korea was under Imperial Japanese rule, some Koreans were subjected to forced labor and sex slavery. This intensified during World War II when the Empire of Japan spread its empire throughout Manchuria, and parts of China. During this period, Koreans fled to mainland Japan and formed mobs to overcome discrimination and crime. The most infamous "mobster" during this period was Kim Du-han, the self-proclaimed son of Korean independence activist Kim Chwa-chin, who grew up as a beggar and became involved with a local gang named Jumok ("fist"). He rose through the ranks and became infamous for his bouts with the yakuza.

The colonial branch of the Imperial Japanese yakuza was then under the control of Hayashi, an ethnic Korean who defected to the Japanese and joined the yakuza. The rival mob to Hayashi's yakuza was controlled by Koo Majok, but the Korean mafia was always short of money and many local mob bosses were disloyal to Koo and formed separated mobs, notably Shin Majak and Shang Kal (twin knives). Koo Majok finally tried to solidify his control over the Korean mobs by knocking out Shang Kal and taking over his territory, but it caused a backlash. Kim Du-han, originally a member of Shang Kal, rebelled against Koo Majok. Kim killed both Shin Majok and Koo Majok, and unified all the Korean mobs under his command at the age of 18. After solidifying his rule by beating the revolting groups, Kim made his move against the yakuza, starting the famous trial war between Kkangpae and yakuza, which became symbolic of the resistance by Koreans against Japanese. Kim Du-han was a major figure of the movement against the colonial rule and later became a politician in Syngman Rhee's Liberal Party.

=== 1950s–60s: Political mobs ===
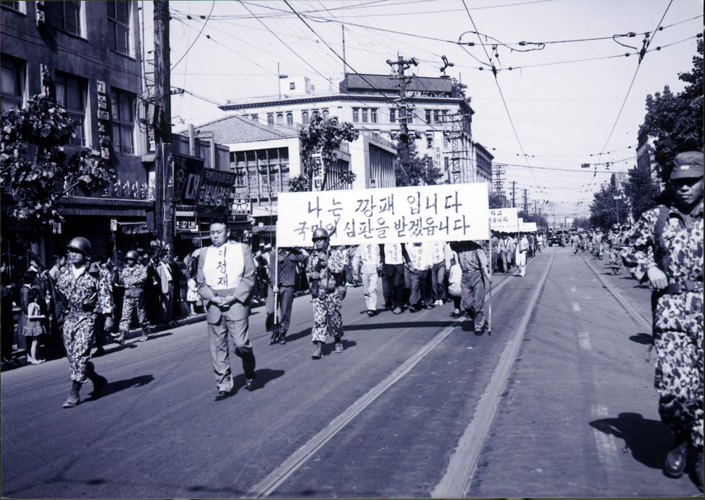
Gang leader Lee Jung-jae being shame-paraded by the Park Chung Hee's military regime (1961). He was arrested after Park's May 16 coup and executed in October 1961.

During the 1950s, two separate Seoul-based groups, the Myung-dong and the Chong-ro, operated to protect Korean merchants from Japanese criminals who were often protected by officials. The 1960s, however, saw a shutdown of nearly all gang activity as those groups were considered a problem by the regime.

=== 1970s–80s: Military rule ===
It was not until the early 1970s that the modern Korean gangs began to emerge. Hierarchical structures began forming during this time, as well as the use of weapons such as knives and iron bars which culminated in more violent attacks. The 1980s was a flourishing period for gangsters, as they were able to infiltrate businesses and set up connections with in-house government and entertainment officials, as well as making ties with other global crime rings.

=== 1990s ===
The early 1990s saw another periodic crackdown with Article 114 of Korean Criminal Law dictating that not only were organized gangs illegal, but those who joined or formed groups could also be charged. This new law forced many into hiding or fleeing, while many others were arrested, and even those who finished their time were often put under surveillance if they were deemed career criminals. However, Korea's rapid globalization has made it hard for law enforcement to completely stamp out organized crime, which continues to be a problem in the present day.

Gang members have been linked to crimes ranging from sex trafficking to drug smuggling, burglary, kidnapping for ransom and extortion. A survey in 2007 showed that 109 inmates jailed for organized criminal activities were all involved in extortion, mostly victimizing/running bars, nightclubs, and game rooms. Gangsters have also been used as hired muscle and strongmen for businesses, such as in the case of Kim Seung-youn, "a conglomerate owner who hired gangsters to abduct and beat up employees of bar". Assaults have become more common in recent years as seen in 2009, when out of 621 gang members, 35% were arrested for assault while extortion took second at 29%, and illegal gambling (11%) and loan sharking (7%) made up the rest. The number of gang members and affiliates jump in years of economic strain, as in the economic slump of 2009, when officials saw a 60% increase in new gang formations and activities. In 2011, police initiated a crackdown on gangs and affiliated members, rounding up 127 individuals within the first week of the "war against organized crime".

South Korean mafiosi often have tattoos of the pa ("branch" or "division" in Korean) they are in. When confronted by other mobs, they show their tattoos to help identify themselves. The tattoo can also be used as a warning to the general public. As a result, tattoos are often considered taboo in South Korean society. The mafia boss in Korea is called hyungnim ("older brother" in Korean).

The stereotypical image of the quintessential South Korean mafioso is one with a gakdoogi hairstyle, which consists of the sides of the head shaved, with hair remaining on top, a big build, dark, black clothing, tacky suits, black-painted luxury cars, prominent tattoos, and regional accents or dialects (사투리Saturi). Contrary to popular belief, Seoul is not a known hotbed of South Korean mob presence. The most prominent organizations of the South Korean mafia operate in the Jeolla region, in cities such as Gwangju and Mokpo, with other South Korean mafiosi known to be operating in Busan and Incheon.

=== Prominent South Korean gangs ===
There are many named local gangs and organized crime affiliates in South Korea. They often operate small, local businesses to earn extra money, however, their usual source of income comes from protection fees, in which they take over a certain neighborhood designated as their "territory" (구역), demanding that all businesses in the neighborhood make a monthly payment to the gang leaders in exchange for not damaging their business. Some of the most preeminent criminal syndicates are:

- the Beomseobangpa gang, founded in the 1990s by Kim Tae-chon (김태촌), one of the most powerful criminals in South Korea.
- the Yangeuni Family, one of the most powerful criminal syndicates in South Korea, founded in the 1970s by Cho Yang-eun (조양은), a powerful South Korean crime boss arrested by the Philippine government in 2013.
- the Chilsung-pa (also known as the Seven Star Mob), known as one of the biggest criminal syndicates in South Korea, the biggest crime syndicate of Busan and whose main source of profit for the gang is extortion and blackmail.

== In popular culture ==
Films romanticizing kkangpae have featured in South Korean cinema since the 1970s, but gained a foothold in the market in the early 1990s. Such films emphasized traits like loyalty, decency, and morality against a backdrop of violence and corruption. The popularity of films like Friend (2001), A Bittersweet Life (2005), New World (2013) popularized the image of the identifiable and ‘honorable’ gangster.

The rise in gang-centered content in film and television has been linked to changes in the public perception of kkangpae, particularly in teens and younger audiences. Some have linked this to the increase in school-yard gangs known as iljinhoe, which may take cues from such movies in the form of intimidation and mental or physical abuse. Youths may look up to kkangpae characters for their strength and intelligence outside of the restrictive classroom setting. Kkangpae were shown as important characters in the 2014 Franco-U.S. film Lucy.

Korean gang culture is also quite prominent in TV shows. Some notorious fictional Korean gangs that feature prominently in TV series include:

- K-Town Killers in The Shield. Considered the main Asian gang in the series, they are known for being quite violent and for having prostitution and drug trafficking (mainly fentanyl) as their main economic activities.
- Shin Kkangpae in Power. Originally from South Korea, this gang is considered one of the responsible for the intense drug trafficking between the United States and Asia. This gang is led by Jae Shin (played by CS Lee), a xenophobic and racist South Korean drug lord who, in order not to arouse suspicion about his criminal empire, presents himself as a legitimate businessman, owner of a famous Korean restaurant.
- Golden Boys Gang or G-Boys in S.W.A.T.. Considered one of the most ruthless and brutal enemies of the first season of S.W.A.T., they are the main antagonists in two episodes of the first season, K-Town (1x11) and Vendetta (1x20). Responsible for trafficking fentanyl in Los Angeles, this powerful Korean criminal syndicate is headquartered in Koreatown, Los Angeles and led by Jae Kim (played by Kelvin Han Yee), a powerful Korean real estate mogul, who behind the image of a legitimate real estate businessman hides that he is a bloodthirsty drug kingpin who does everything he can to keep the lucrative fentanyl business alive, including kidnapping the son of one of the allies of LAPD Metropolitan Division, Katrina "K.C." Walsh, a DEA special agent (portrayed by MC Lyte).

== See also ==
- Triad (organized crime)
- Tong (organization)
- Yakuza
