= Jo Jung-suk filmography =

Films of Korean actor

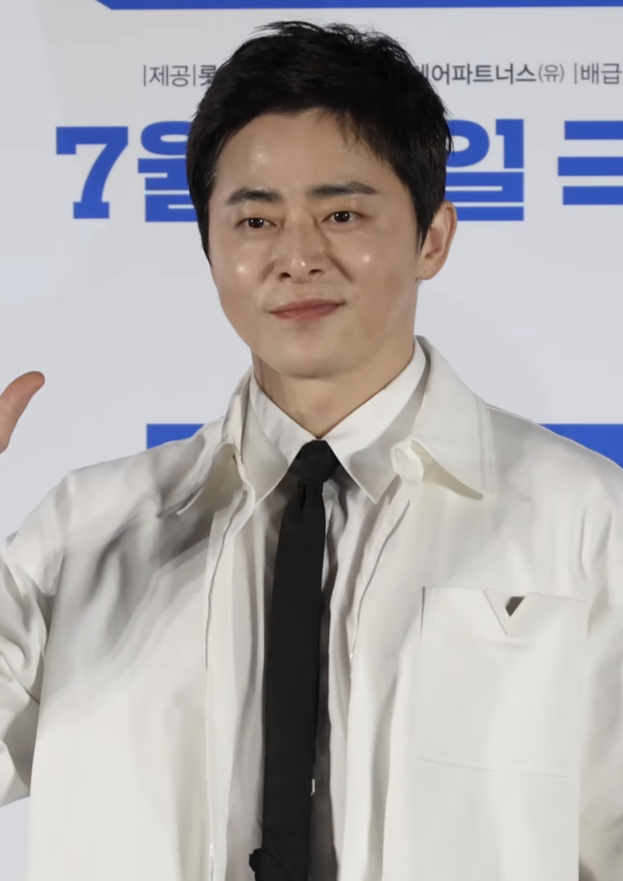
- Jo at the Pilot film press conference
- Film: 15
- Television series: 14
- Television show: 4

Jo Jung-suk (Korean: 조정석; born December 26, 1980) is a South Korean actor with a diverse body of work across various entertainment platforms. He began his career in musical, making his debut on stage in 2004 with musical The Nutcracker. After performing exclusively on stage for seven years, he auditioned for a television role, landing a role in the MBN musical drama What's Up (2011–2012).

Following this, he auditioned for a supporting role in Architecture 101 (2012), where he portrayed Nabddeuki, the best friend of the protagonist, played by Lee Je-hoon. This marked his film debut and proved to be a breakthrough role, earning him critical acclaim. For his performance in Architecture 101, Jo Jung-suk won multiple awards, including the Best New Actor Award at the 2012 Blue Dragon Film Awards. He further solidified his reputation onscreen with drama series The King Two Hearts (2012) where he was nominated for several New Actor Awards.

He continued to star in the television series Oh My Ghost (2015), Don't Dare to Dream (2016), Hospital Playlist (2020–2021), as well as films The Face Reader (2013), My Annoying Brother (2016), Exit (2019), and My Daughter Is a Zombie (2025). For his role in the film Pilot (2024), he won the 60th Baeksang Arts Awards for Best Actor in Film.

== Filmography ==
=== Film ===
Year	Title	Role	Notes	Ref.
2012	Architecture 101	Nabddeuki	Film debut	
2012	Almost Che	Hwang Young-min / Kang Moon-mo		
2013	The Face Reader	Paeng-heon		
2014	The Fatal Encounter	Sal-soo		
2014	My Love, My Bride	Young-min		
2015	The Exclusive: Beat the Devil's Tattoo	Heo Moo-hyuk		
2016	Time Renegades	Ji-hwan		
2016	My Annoying Brother	Go Doo-shik		
2018	Intimate Strangers	Yeon-woo	Voice cameo	
2018	The Drug King	Kim In-goo		
2019	Hit-and-Run Squad	Jung Jae-cheol		
2019	Exit	Yong-nam		
2024	Pilot	Han Jung-woo		
2024	Land of Happiness	Jung In-hoo		
2025	My Daughter Is a Zombie	Lee Jung-hwan		

=== Television series ===
Acting credit of Jo in series
Year	Title	Role	Notes	Ref.
2011	What's Up	Kim Byung-gun		
2012	The King 2 Hearts	Eun Shi-kyung		
2013	You Are the Best!	Shin Joon-ho		
2015	Oh My Ghost	Kang Sun-woo		
2016	Don't Dare to Dream	Lee Hwa-shin		
2016	The Legend of the Blue Sea	Yoo Jeong-hoon	Cameo (Ep. 7–8)	
2017–2018	Two Cops	Cha Dong-tak / Gong Su-chang		
2018	Familiar Wife	Kang Sun-woo	Cameo (Ep. 15)	
2019	Nokdu Flower	Baek Yi-kang		
2020–2021	Hospital Playlist	Lee Ik-joon	Season 1–2	
2024	Captivating the King	King Yi In / Grand Prince Jinhan		
2024	When the Stars Gossip	Newscaster	Cameo (Ep. 1–2)	
2025	Weak Hero	Choi Chang Hui	Cameo (Ep. 5, 7–8)	
2025	Resident Playbook	Lee Ik-joon	Cameo (Ep. 10)	

=== Variety shows ===
Year	Title	Role	Notes	Ref.
2016	Youth Over Flowers (Iceland)	Cast member		
2021	Wise Mountain Village Life	Cast member		
2021	Saturday Night Live Korea	Host	Coupang Play Show, Season 10, Episode 3	
2024	A-list to Playlist	Main cast	Netflix Original	
