= List of awards and nominations received by Jo Jung-suk =

Jo Jung-suk awards and nominations
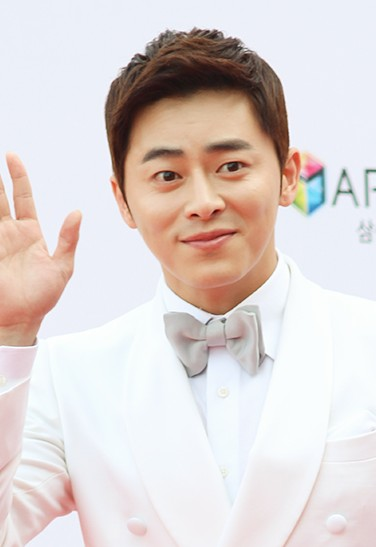
- Jo on the red carpet of The Musical Awards on June 3, 2013
Awards and nominations
Award	Wins	Nominations
APAN Star Awards	0	3
Baeksang Art Awards	1	4
Blue Dragon Film Awards	1	5
Brand of the Year	2	2
Buil Film Awards	0	3
Chunsa Film Art Awards	0	1
Cine21 Film Awards	1	1
Genie Music Awards	2	2
Genie Music Awards	2	2
Golden Cinematography Awards	1	1
Golden Disc Awards	1	1
Golden Ticket Awards	0	1
Grand Bell Awards	1	3
KBS Drama Awards	2	2
KOFRA Film Awards	1	1
Korea Advertiser Association	1	1
Korea Association of Film Critics Awards	1	1
Korea Culture and Entertainment Awards	0	0
Korea Drama Awards	0	3
Korea First Brand Awards	2	2
Korea Musical Awards	2	2
Korea World Youth Film Festival	2	2
Max Movie Awards	0	1
MBC Drama Awards	1	3
Melon Music Awards	1	1
Mnet Asian Music Awards	1	1
Mnet 20's Choice Awards	1	1
The Musical Awards	1	2
SBS Drama Awards	2	3
Seoul Music Awards	1	1
Seoul International Drama Awards	1	2
Style Icon Awards	1	1
TvN10 Awards	2	3

Totals (Note: Certain award groups do not simply award one winner. They acknowledge several different recipients, have runners-up, and have third place. Since this is a specific recognition and is different from losing an award, runner-up mentions are considered wins in this award tally. For simplification and to avoid errors, each award in this list has been presumed to have had a prior nomination.)
- Wins: 35
- Nominations: 63

South Korean actor Jo Jung-suk (Korean: 조정석; born December 26, 1980) has been recognized with numerous awards and nominations across his career in film, television, and theatre.

In television, his achievements span multiple major network awards. He has earned one award from MBC Drama Awards for his drama Two Cops (2017), as well as two awards from KBS Drama Awards for his drama You Are the Best! (2013). Furthermore, he has amassed four wins at the SBS Drama Awards for his roles in Don't Dare to Dream (2016) and Nokdu Flower (2019).

Jo has received commendations from the South Korean government for his cultural and public contributions. In 2016, he was awarded a Minister of Culture, Sports and Tourism Commendation at the Korean Popular Culture and Arts Awards. This was followed in 2011 by a Presidential Commendation at the 55th Taxpayers' Day ceremony. In 2024, he was awarded a Presidential Commendation at the Korean Popular Culture and Arts Awards.

As film actor his status was officially recognized in 2021 when the Korean Film Council (KOFIC) included him on its "Korean Actor 200" list, which aims to introduce the most prominent South Korean actors to the global film industry. For his role in the film Pilot (2024), he won the Baeksang Arts Award for Best Actor in Film. Jo also made the list of Forbes Korea Power Celebrity 40 twice, in 2017 and 2021.

== Awards and nominations ==
Name of the award ceremony, year presented, category, nominee(s) of the award, and the result of the nomination
Award	Year	Category	Nominee / Work	Result	Ref.
APAN Star Awards	2015	Excellence Award, Actor in a Miniseries	Oh My Ghost	Nominated	
APAN Star Awards	2018	Top Excellence Award, Actor in a Miniseries	Two Cops	Nominated	
APAN Star Awards	2021	Top Excellence Award, Actor in a Miniseries	Hospital Playlist	Nominated	
Baeksang Arts Awards	2013	Best New Actor – Television	The King 2 Hearts	Nominated	
Baeksang Arts Awards	2017	Best Actor – Television	Don't Dare to Dream	Nominated	
Baeksang Arts Awards	2020	Best Actor – Film	Exit	Nominated	
Baeksang Arts Awards	2025	Best Actor – Film	Pilot	Won	
Blue Dragon Film Awards	2012	Best New Actor	Architecture 101	Won	
Blue Dragon Film Awards	2013	Best Supporting Actor	The Face Reader	Nominated	
Blue Dragon Film Awards	2019	Best Actor	Exit	Nominated	
Blue Dragon Film Awards	2025	Best Actor	My Daughter is a Zombie	Nominated	
Brand of the Year Awards	2020	Best Actor of the Year	Hospital Playlist	Won	
Brand of the Year Awards	2020	Best OST of the Year	"Aloha"	Won	
Buil Film Awards	2012	Best New Actor	Architecture 101	Nominated	
Buil Film Awards	2012	Best Supporting Actor	Architecture 101	Nominated	
Buil Film Awards	2025	Best Actor	Land of Happiness	Nominated	
Chunsa Film Art Awards	2020	Best Actor	Exit	Nominated	
Cine21 Film Awards	2012	Best New Actor	Architecture 101	Won	
Genie Music Awards	2020	Best OST	"Aloha"	Won	
Golden Cinematography Awards	2025	Best Actor	My Daughter Is a Zombie	Won	
Golden Disc Awards	2021	Best OST	"Aloha"	Won	
Golden Ticket Awards (Note: The Golden Ticket Awards (골든티켓어워즈) is an awards ceremony that selects works and people who have shown the best ticket power by performance genre during the year. Since 2005, Interpark has held an awards ceremony by adding up ticket sales, ranking scores, and online voting for each year at the end of the year.)	2018	Best Theater Actor	Amadeus	Nominated	
Grand Bell Awards	2012	Best Supporting Actor	Architecture 101	Nominated	
Grand Bell Awards	2012	Best New Actor	Architecture 101	Nominated	
Grand Bell Awards	2013	Best Supporting Actor	The Face Reader	Won	
KBS Drama Awards	2013	Excellence Award, Actor in a Serial Drama	You Are the Best!	Won	
KBS Drama Awards	2013	Best Couple Award	Jo Jung-suk with IU; You Are the Best!	Won	
KOFRA Film Awards	2013	Best New Actor	Architecture 101	Won	
Korea Advertisers Association	2021	Advertisers' Choice-Great Model Award	Jo Jung-suk	Won	
Korean Association of Film Critics Awards	2013	Best Supporting Actor	The Face Reader	Won	
Korean Culture and Entertainment Awards	2012	Best New Actor	Architecture 101	Won	
Korea Drama Awards	2012	Best New Actor	The King 2 Hearts	Nominated	
Korea Drama Awards	2015	Excellence Award, Actor	Oh My Ghost	Nominated	
Korea Drama Awards	2019	Grand Prize (Daesang) (Note: A Daesang (Korean: 대상), which translates to "Grand Prize", is the highest honor given out at South Korean award ceremonies.)	Nokdu Flower	Nominated	
Korea First Brand awards	2020	Male Commercial Model	Jo Jung-suk	Won	
Korea First Brand awards	2022	Best Actor	Jo Jung-suk	Won	
Korea First Brand awards	2025	Promising Actor (Film) to Lead in 2025	Jo Jung-suk	Nominated	
Korea Musical Awards	2008	Best New Actor	The Harmonium in My Memory	Won	
Korea Musical Awards	2009	Best Supporting Actor	Spring Awakening	Won	
Korea World Youth Film Festival	2013	Best New Actor	The Face Reader	Won	
Korea World Youth Film Festival	2014	Popularity Award	My Love, My Bride	Won	
Marie Claire Asia Star Awards (Note: Busan International Film Festival)	2019	Asia Star Award	Jo Jung-suk	Won	
Max Movie Awards	2014	Best Supporting Actor	The Face Reader	Nominated	
MBC Drama Awards	2012	Best New Actor	The King 2 Hearts	Nominated	
MBC Drama Awards	2017	Grand Prize (Daesang)	Two Cops	Nominated	
MBC Drama Awards	2017	Top Excellence Award, Actor in a Monday-Tuesday Drama	Two Cops	Won	
Melon Music Awards	2020	Best OST	"Aloha"	Won	
Mnet Asian Music Awards	2020	Best OST	"Aloha"	Nominated	
Mnet Asian Music Awards	2020	Song of the Year	"Aloha"	Nominated	
Mnet Asian Music Awards	2021	Best OST	"I Like You"	Won	
Mnet 20's Choice Awards	2012	20's Booming Actor	Architecture 101, The King 2 Hearts	Won	
The Musical Awards	2009	Best Actor	Janggeum the Great	Nominated	
The Musical Awards	2010	Best Supporting Actor	Spring Awakening	Won	
SBS Drama Awards	2016	Grand Prize (Daesang)	Don't Dare to Dream	Nominated	
SBS Drama Awards	2016	Top Excellence Award, Actor in a Romantic Comedy Drama	Don't Dare to Dream	Won	
SBS Drama Awards	2016	Top 10 Stars Award	Don't Dare to Dream	Won	
SBS Drama Awards	2019	Top Excellence Award, Actor in a Mid-Length Drama	Nokdu Flower	Won	
Seoul Music Award	2020	Best OST	"Aloha"	Won	
Star Night - Korea Top Star Awards Ceremony	2016	Korea's Top Star	My Annoying Brother	Won	
Style Icon Awards	2012	New Icon	Jo Jung-suk	Won	
tvN10 Awards	2016	Romantic Comedy King	Oh My Ghost	Nominated	
tvN10 Awards	2016	Two Star Award	Oh My Ghost	Won	
tvN10 Awards	2016	Best Kiss Award	Jo Jung-suk with Park Bo-young; Oh My Ghost	6th place	

== State honors ==
Name of the organization, year presented, and the award given
Country	Ceremony	Year	Award	Ref.
South Korea	Korean Popular Culture and Arts Awards (Note: Honors are given at the Korean Popular Culture and Arts Awards, arranged by the Korea Creative Content Agency and hosted by the Ministry of Culture, Sports and Tourism. They are awarded to those who have contributed to the arts and South Korea's pop culture.)	2016	Minister of Culture, Sports and Tourism Commendation	
South Korea	Korean Popular Culture and Arts Awards	2024	Presidential Commendation	
South Korea	Taxpayers' Day	2021	Presidential Commendation	

== Listicles ==
Name of publisher, year listed, name of listicle, and placement
Publisher	Year	Listicle	Placement	Ref.
Cine21	2021	Actors that will lead Korean Video Content Industry in 2022	6th (Note: mentioned together with Ahn Bo-hyun, Choi Woo-shik, Kim Seon-ho, Kim Soo-hyun, Ma Dong-seok, Park Jeong-min, Ryu Jun-yeol, Song Kang-ho, Wi Ha-joon)	
Forbes Korea	2017	Korea Power Celebrity 40	9th	
Forbes Korea	2021	Korea Power Celebrity 40	37th	
Korean Film Council	2021	Korean Actors 200 (Note: The list introduces the 200 actors that best represent the present and future of Korean cinema to the people in the film industry all over the world.)	Included	
The Screen	2019	2009–2019 Top Box Office Powerhouse Actors in Korean Movies	24th	
