= Park Hoon =

South Korean actor

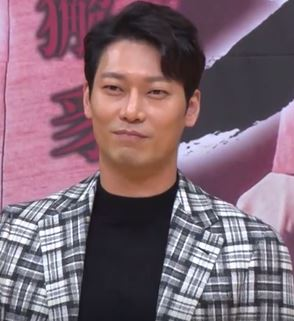
- Park in 2019
- Born: Park Won-hee; April 27, 1981 (age 45); Sabuk-eup, Jeongseon County, Gangwon Province, South Korea
- Education: Paekche Institute of The Arts – Musical
- Occupation: Actor
- Agent: Artist Company
- Spouse: Park Min-jung (m. 2017)

Korean name
- Hangul: 박원희
- RR: Bak Wonhui
- MR: Pak Wŏnhŭi

Stage name
- Hangul: 박훈
- RR: Bak Hun
- MR: Pak Hun

Park Won-hee (Korean: 박원희; born April 27, 1981), better known by his stage name Park Hoon (박훈), is a South Korean actor. He won Best Supporting Actor at the 17th Asian Film Awards for his role in Kim Sung-su's film 12.12: The Day. He was included into the "Chungmuro 10 Million Viewers Club," a recognition given to actors whose films have sold more than 10 million tickets in South Korea.

Park began his career in 2007 as a musical actor in Daehangno. After performing in musicals and plays for some time, he made his film debut in a minor role in 2008 and his television debut in 2015. He first gained recognition for his role in the drama Descendants of the Sun (2016) and further expanded his recognition as a second lead in Memories of the Alhambra (2018), for which he earned a nomination for Best New Actor Television at the Baeksang Arts Awards.

== Career ==
=== Beginning onstage ===
Park Hoon debuted in 2007 in Jang Yu-jeong's musical Oh! While You Were Sleeping. Afterwards, he also performed in musicals like Brothers Were Brave, Hello, Francesca, and Temptation of Wolves. He also appeared in stage productions such as the play Model Students.

=== Television debut ===
He made his television debut in the 2015 tvN drama Oh My Ghost with small role. His breakthrough came in the following year with drama Descendants of the Sun, portraying Sergeant First Class Choi Woo-geun, a special forces sniper. His performance as a loyal and strong soldier earned him positive reviews and successfully introduced him to a wider audience.

In the 2018 drama Memories of the Alhambra, Park played dual roles of Cha Hyung-seok, a sharp-looking IT company CEO who also appears as a character within a video game. Though his character had minimal dialogue, Park Hoon earned the nickname "Cha Zombie" for his ability to convey intensity and tension through his eyes and expressions. He earned a nomination for Best New Actor Television in Baeksang Arts Awards for this role.

He received praise for his transformative performance in the 2020 drama Nobody Knows, where he played the villainous Baek Sang-ho. His chilling portrayal was described as an "unprecedented character," with his intense acting creating numerous "breathtaking" scenes.

In his first leading film role, Park starred in the 2021 movie Midnight as Jong-tak, a former Marine and security team leader. He gained weight to fully embody the character's solid build. His realistic and vivid portrayal was praised for enhancing the film's quality. This was followed by the 2022 film The Pirates: The Last Royal Treasure, in which he played the ruthless character Mangcho. His cold gaze and intense performance in the action scenes were noted for their powerful charisma.

=== International recognition ===
In 2023, Park joined the supporting cast of the Kim Sung-su's historical drama film 12.12: The Day. The film is set against the backdrop of 1979 South Korean coup d'état. Park played the role of Moon Il-pyeong, the chief secretary to the film's antagonist, Jeon Du-gwang (played by Hwang Jung-min), and a key figure in the coup. For his powerful performance, Park won Best Supporting Actor at the 17th Asian Film Awards, held in Hong Kong on March 10, 2024. Released theatrically on November 22, 2023, the film was the highest-grossing film of 2023, drawing over 13.12 million viewers in South Korea.

In the film Harbin (2024), Park plays Tatsuo Mori, a Japanese soldier. Director Woo Min-ho specifically offered him the role, and after reading the script, Park interpreted his character as a force that embodies the imperialistic spirit of Itō Hirobumi. Park stated that shaving his head for the role was not a special effort but a visual tool to demonstrate his character's obsession with imperialism.

In 2025, Park was cast in the Korean premiere of the British play The Effect, written by Lucy Prebble. Kim was triple cast as the character Dr. Toby, starring alongside Yang So-min, and Min Jin-woong. The play explores themes of love and sorrow through the story of two clinical trial participants and their supervising doctors. The production was directed by Min Sae-rom, with Park Ji-sun as the screenwriter and Bae Yu-ri as the motion director. The show ran from June 10 to August 31 at the Nol Seo-kyung Square Scone Theater 2.

== Personal life ==
Park Hoon's birth name is Park Won-hee. He adopted his late brother's nickname, "Park Hoon", as his stage name to honor his memory. He chose the name to give himself a sense of responsibility and ensure he would not bring shame to his brother's name. His brother, Park Hoon-hee, died by suicide when Park was 14, a tragedy that led to his parents' separation.

Park met actress Park Min-jung while doing theater together. They held their wedding ceremony on September 22, 2017 at a location in Seoul.

== Filmography ==
=== Film ===
Key
†	Denotes films that have not yet been released

Year	Title	Role	Notes	Ref.
2008	Death Bell	Creditor		
2010	Finding Mr. Destiny	Detective		
2014	Thuy	Welfare center husband		
2016	A Violent Prosecutor	Chul-goo's subordinate		
2018	Golden Slumber	Team Leader Sun		
2021	Midnight	Jong-tak	TVING Film	
2022	The Pirates: The Last Royal Treasure	Mangcho	Netflix film	
2022	Hansan: Rising Dragon	Yi Un-ryong		
2022	Confidential Assignment 2: International	Park Sang-wi		
2023	12.12: The Day	Moon Il-pyeong		
2023	Noryang: Deadly Sea	Lee Woon-ryong		
2024	Land of Happiness	Kim Oh-ryong		
2024	Harbin	Tatsuo Mori		

=== Television series ===
Year	Title	Role	Notes	Ref.
2015	Oh My Ghost			
2015	Six Flying Dragons	Chuk In-gwang		
2016	Descendants of the Sun	Choi Woo-geun		
2016	KBS Drama Special – The Red Teacher	NSA Agent		
2016	Happy Home	young Sam-bong		
2016	Monster	Oh Choong-dong		
2017	Naked Fireman	Oh Sung-jin		
2017	Disorted	Informant		
2017	Two Cops	Tak Jae-hee		
2017	The Lady in Dignity			
2018	Memories of the Alhambra	Cha Hyung-seok		
2019	Haechi	Dal-moon		
2019	Nokdu Flower	Kim Chang soo	Cameo, Ep. 48	
2019	Designated Survivor: 60 Days	Major Jang Jun Ha	Cameo, Ep. 6	
2020	Nobody Knows	Baek Sang-ho		
2020	The King: Eternal Monarch	Jo Yeong's father	Cameo	
2022	Tomorrow	Ha Dae-soo	Cameo, Ep.15-16	
2022	Big Mouth	Seo Jae-yong		
2023	Payback: Money and Power	Hwang Ki-seok		
2023-2026	Bloodhounds	Moon Kwang-moo		
2025	Trigger	Goo Jeong-man		
2027	Full Count	Cho Dong-hee		

=== Web series ===
Year	Title	Role	Notes	Ref.
2022	Soundtrack #1	Gyeol-han	Special appearance	
2022	Remarriage & Desires	Cha Seok-jin		

== Theater ==
=== Musical Theater ===
Year	Title		Role	Theater	Date	Ref.
Year	English	Korean	Role	Theater	Date	Ref.
2007	Oh! While You Were Sleeping	오! 당신이 잠든 사이	Peter	JTN Art Hall 4	January 6, 2007 to July 22, 2007	
2008-2010	Oh! While You Were Sleeping	오! 당신이 잠든 사이	Peter	JTN Art Hall 4	November 4, 2008 to February 28, 2010	
2008	Brave Brothers	형제는 용감했다	Song Hye-ja	Jayu Theater, Daehangno	March 22, 2008 to June 22, 2008	
2008	Goodbye, Francesca	안녕, 프란체스카	Ensemble	Theater Yong, National Museum of Korea	September 12, 2008 to October 26, 2008	
2008	Brave Brothers	형제는 용감했다	Yi-ong	Yeongang Hall, Doosan Art Center	December 5, 2008 to February 8, 2009	
2009	Brave Brothers	형제는 용감했다	Yi-ong	Suri Hall (Grand Performance Hall), Gunpo Culture and Arts Center	February 14, 2009 to February 15, 2009	
2009	Brave Brothers	형제는 용감했다	Scholars	COEX Shinhan Card Artium	May 1, 2009 to July 12, 2009	
2009	Brave Brothers	형제는 용감했다	Scholars	Eoullim Theater, Goyang Eoullim Nuri	August 28, 2009 to August 29, 2009	
2010	Brave Brothers 2010	형제는 용감했다 2010	Yi-ong	COEX Shinhan Card Artium	April 1, 2010 to June 20, 2010	
2010	Brave Brothers 2010	형제는 용감했다 2010	Yi-ong	MBC Lotte Art Hall	July 16, 2010 to July 18, 2010	
2010	Brave Brothers 2010	형제는 용감했다 2010	Yi-ong	Grand Performance Hall, Chuncheon Culture and Arts Center	August 20, 2010 to August 21, 2010	
2010	Brave Brothers 2010	형제는 용감했다 2010	Yi-ong	Grand Theater, Gyeonggi Arts Center	December 18, 2010 to December 19, 2010	
2011	Temptation of Wolves	늑대의 유혹	Ensemble	COEX Shinhan Card Artium	July 14, 2011 to October 30, 2011	
2011	March of Youth	젊음의 행진	Brother-in-law	COEX Shinhan Card Artium	November 12, 2011 to January 29, 2012	
2012	March of Youth	젊음의 행진	Brother-in-law	Baekun Art Hall, Wonju	February 4, 2012 to February 5, 2012	
2012	Brave Brothers	형제는 용감했다	Yi-ong	COEX Shinhan Card Artium	June 26, 2012 to October 1, 2012	
2012	Brave Brothers	형제는 용감했다	Yi-ong	Grand Performance Hall, Icheon Art Hall	October 26, 2012 to October 27, 2012	
2012	Brave Brothers	형제는 용감했다	Yi-ong	Grand Theater, Busan Cultural Center	November 10, 2012 to November 11, 2012	
2012	Brave Brothers	형제는 용감했다	Yi-ong	Grand Theater, Uijeongbu Arts Center	November 29, 2012 to November 30, 2012	
2013	Triangle	트라이앵글	Gyeong-min	Sangmyung Art Hall 1	September 6, 2013 to January 26, 2014	
2015	Moonlight Fairy and Girl	달빛요정과 소녀	Moonlight fairy	Chungmu Art Hall Small Theater Blue Stage	January 20 to February 8, 2015	
2015	Moonlight Fairy and Girl	달빛요정과 소녀	Moonlight fairy	YES24 Art One 1	May 8 to May 31, 2015	
2019	Moonlight Fairy and Girl	달빛요정과 소녀	Moonlight fairy	Daehangno SH Art Hall	January 7 to 20, 2019	
2023	Moonlight Song - Gangneung	월하가요 - 강릉		Seon-gyojang, Gangneung	June 8 to 14, 2023	

=== Theater Play ===
Theater play performance
Year	Title		Role	Theater	Date	Ref.
Year	English	Korean	Role	Theater	Date	Ref.
2012	Model Students	모범생들	Kim Myeong-jun	Yes24 Art One Hall 3	February 3, 2012 to July 22, 2012	
2012	Model Students	모범생들	Kim Myeong-jun	Ensemble Hall, Daejeon Arts Center	December 14, 2012 to December 30, 2012	
2013	Model Students	모범생들	Kim Myeong-jun	Jayu Theater, Daehangno	May 31, 2013 to September 29, 2013	
2013	Puzzle	퍼즐	Maurice	Happy Theater	November 21, 2013 to March 2, 2014	
2014	Almost, Maine	올모스트 메인		JTN Art Hall 4	January 23, 2014 to February 23, 2014	
2014	Three Generations Gone Wild	바람난 삼대		Sangmyung Art Hall 1	February 7, 2014 to August 31, 2014	
2014	Judo Boy	유도소년	Gyeong-chan	Yes24 Art One Hall 3	April 26, 2014 to July 13, 2014	
2014	Perfect Insurance Company	완전보험주식회사	Han Bo-jang	Space Piccolo, Daehangno Musical Center	September 11, 2014 to November 2, 2014	
2014	The Story of a Old Thief	늘근도둑 이야기	Investigator	Daehangno Sori Art Hall 1	November 21, 2014 to March 29, 2015	
2015	Judo Boy	유도소년	Gyeong-chan	Yes24 Art One Hall 3	February 7, 2015 to May 3, 2015	
2015	The Story of a Old Thief - Daegu	늘근도둑 이야기 - 대구	Investigator	Gaon Hall, Daegu Bongsan Culture Center	March 4, 2015 to March 15, 2015	
2015	The Story of a Old Thief - Daegu	늘근도둑 이야기 - 대구	Investigator	COEX Art Hall	April 8, 2015 to March 6, 2016	
2015	The Story of a Old Thief - Daegu	늘근도둑 이야기 - 대구	Investigator	Grand Theater, Uijeongbu Arts Center	April 10, 2015 to April 11, 2015	
2015	Judo Boy - Ansan	유도소년 - 안산	Gyeong-chan	Dalmaj-i Theater, Ansan Arts Center	May 21, 2015 to May 24, 2015	
2015	Judo Boy - Ansan	유도소년 - 안산	Gyeong-chan	Saerasae Theater, Goyang Aram Nuri	August 21, 2015 to August 23, 2015	
2015	Judo Boy - Ansan	유도소년 - 안산	Gyeong-chan	Grand Performance Hall, Osan Culture and Arts Center	October 2, 2015 to October 3, 2015	
2015	Judo Boy - Ansan	유도소년 - 안산	Gyeong-chan	Gaon Hall, Daegu Bongsan Culture Center	October 9, 2015 to October 10, 2015	
2016	Come See Me	날 보러와요	Detective Jo	Yes24 Stage Hall 2	September 21, 2016 to December 11, 2016	
2016	Bunker Trilogy	벙커 트릴로지	Soldier 1	Hongik Daehangno Art Center Small Theater	December 6, 2016 to February 19, 2017	
2017	Judo Boy	유도소년	Gyeong-chan	Yes24 Stage Hall 3	March 4, 2017 to May 14, 2017	
2021–2022	Understudy	언더스터디	Harry	Jayu Theater, Seoul Arts Center	December 21, 2021 to February 27, 2022	
2025	The Effect	디 이펙트	Dr. Toby	NOL Seogyeong Square Scone 2nd Building	June 10, 2025 to August 31, 2025	
2025	The Effect	디 이펙트	Dr. Toby	NOL Seogyeong Square Scone 2nd Building	July 23 to 26, 2025	

== Awards and nominations ==
Award ceremony	Year	Category	Nominated work	Result	Ref.
Asian Film Awards	2024	Best Supporting Actor	12.12: The Day	Won	
Baeksang Arts Awards	2019	Best New Actor (TV)	Memories of the Alhambra	Nominated	
SBS Drama Awards	2019	Best Supporting Actor	Haechi	Nominated	
SBS Drama Awards	2020	Excellence Award, Actor in a Miniseries Genre/Action Drama	Nobody Knows	Nominated	
SBS Drama Awards	2023	Excellence Award, Actor in a Miniseries Genre/Action Drama	Payback	Nominated	
