= Jo Jung-suk =

South Korean actor (born 1980)

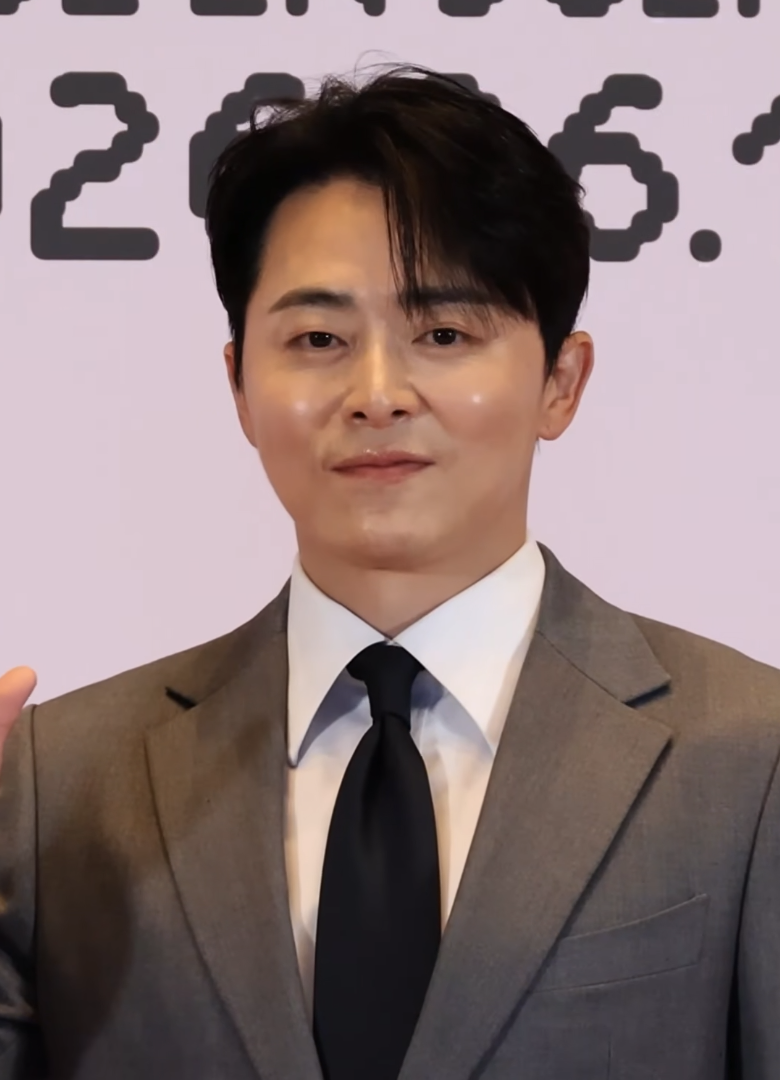
- Jo in June 2026
- Born: December 26, 1980 (age 45); Banghwa-dong, Gangseo-gu, Seoul, South Korea
- Other name: Cho Jung-seok
- Education: Seoul Institute of the Arts (Theater)
- Occupation: Actor
- Years active: 2004–present
- Agent: JAM Entertainment
- Works: Filmography; theater; discography
- Spouse: Gummy (m. 2018)
- Children: 2
- Awards: Full list

Korean name
- Hangul: 조정석
- Hanja: 曺政奭
- RR: Jo Jeongseok
- MR: Cho Chŏngsŏk
- Website: chojungseok.co.kr

Jo Jung-suk (Korean: 조정석; born December 26, 1980) is a South Korean actor. He began his career in theatre, starring in Spring Awakening, Hedwig and the Angry Inch, Grease and stage adaptation of The Harmonium in My Memory, among many other musicals and plays.

After nearly a decade on the stage, Jo made his film debut as a comedic supporting actor in the box office hit Architecture 101 (2012), which became his breakout role. He continued to star in the television series The King 2 Hearts (2012), Oh My Ghost (2015), Don't Dare to Dream (2016), Hospital Playlist (2020–2021), as well as films The Face Reader (2013), My Annoying Brother (2016), Exit (2019), and My Daughter Is a Zombie (2025). For his role in the film Pilot (2024), he won the Baeksang Arts Award for Best Actor.

== Career ==
=== 2004–2010: Early career, becoming a musical star ===
Jo Jung-suk had always wanted to be on stage. He was admitted into the Theater department of Seoul Institute of the Arts on student loan, but after his father died in 2000, Jo's widowed mother became fully dependent on him. He was granted an exemption from military service due to family circumstances, and he quit school before graduating so he could start earning money by doing musicals. He made his professional acting debut in The Nutcracker in 2004.

Jo then became active and well-known in musical theatre, performing in a total of 25 musicals during the first nine years of his career, including, musical adaptation of The Harmonium in My Memory, Organ in My Heart, musical adaptation of Jewel in the Palace, Janggeum the Great, as well as Korean productions of Hedwig and the Angry Inch, Grease, The Island, and Spring Awakening.

Jo Jung-suk expressed in an interview with the media:

"To be honest, I don't really like the term 'musical actor.' I just want to be an actor. A really good actor."
— Financial News, May 3, 2007.

=== 2011–2018: Rising to prominence with breakout roles, taking on leading roles, and critical acclaim on screen ===
In 2011, he landed his first television role on cable series What's Up, playing an awkward but talented music student. However, 2012 proved to be his breakout year with two high-profile projects. In his big-screen debut, he played a supporting role as Nab-ddeuk, the young hero's best friend, in the box-office hit Architecture 101. Jo's performance, which brimmed with personality and comic timing, earned him the Best New Actor award at the Blue Dragon Film Awards, along with nominations from the Grand Bell Awards and Buil Film Awards. He was once again a scene stealer in his third onscreen role as earnest soldier Eun Shi-kyung in the drama series The King 2 Hearts. Jo's display of versatility and screen presence in these projects caused a surge in his mainstream prominence, resulting in close to twenty offers for films and TV series, in addition to commercial endorsements.

He next starred in big-screen comedy Almost Che, which was loosely based on a real-life 1985 incident where student activists forcibly occupied the US Cultural Center in Seoul and had a standoff with the police.

I felt that he is an exceptionally talented actor. Jo Jung-suk made a strong impression on many through Architecture 101, but he also expressed a wide range of emotions in our film (The Face Reader). I believe he is a naturally gifted actor capable of deeply emotional performances rather than just comedic ones. As a result, I felt very comfortable working with him on set, as he conveyed a lot and actively contributed to creating a wonderful ensemble. He often sang for us on set. I knew he could sing well, but he would sing whenever he had the chance, so it made working together enjoyable. Whenever I see him, I always look forward to it and feel delighted.

— Song Kang-ho, in an interview quoted by Sport Chosun

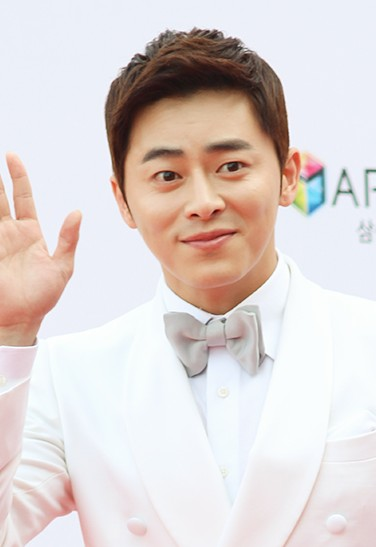
Jo in 2013

In 2013, Jo starred in his first historical film, The Face Reader, directed by Han Jae-rim. He portrayed Paeng-heon, the brother-in-law and assistant of the protagonist Nae-gyeong (portrayed by Song Kang-ho). This character wanders the eight provinces and holds the key to a significant plot reversal in the film. He received favorable reviews from critics for his performance and further established himself as an actor by winning the Best Supporting Actor award at both the Grand Bell Awards and the Korean Association of Film Critics Awards.

At the same year, Jo returned to television in his first onscreen leading role in the 2013 family drama You Are the Best!, co-starring IU. The series aired on KBS2 from March 9 to August 25, 2013, on weekends. Jo also lent his voice to the drama's original soundtrack, titled "I Completely Love You." Ratings peaked at 29.3% for the final episode. At the 2013 KBS Drama Awards, Jo won the Best Couple Award alongside IU for their on-screen chemistry, in addition to the Excellence Award for Actor in a Serial Drama.

In 2014, Jo was featured in two films of different genres. The first, released on April 30, 2014, is the period thriller The Fatal Encounter, where he played an assassin targeting King Jeongjo (portrayed by Hyun Bin). The second film, released on October 8, 2014, is the romantic comedy My Love, My Bride, a remake of the same-titled 1990 hit directed by Im Chan-sang, in which Jo and Shin Min-ah played a newly married couple.

In 2015, Jo starred in tvN drama Oh My Ghost, directed by Yoo Je-won. He acted as Kang Sun-woo, the owner and head chef of Sun Restaurant, an arrogant star chef specializing in pasta, who falls for his kitchen assistant Na Bong-sun (Park Bo-young) who's been possessed by a lustful virgin ghost named Shin Soon-ae (Kim Seul-gi). The drama was a commercial and critical hit. He also headlined The Exclusive: Beat the Devil's Tattoo, in which he played a TV news reporter who gets a scoop, followed by the time-hopping thriller Time Renegades.

In 2016, Jo played an announcer in SBS's romantic comedy Don't Dare to Dream who falls for a weather announcer (played by Gong Hyo-jin). The series was a hit and led to increased prominence for Jo, who then became one of the most in-demand actors in the industry. He then headlined the comedy-drama film My Annoying Brother alongside Park Shin-hye and Doh Kyung-soo of Exo. The film topped box office charts and earned positive reviews for Jo, who was praised for his comedic timing and chemistry with co-star Do.

In 2017, Jo was cast in the gangster thriller The Drug King, directed by Woo Min-ho. The same year, he made his small-screen comeback in MBC's fantasy comedy drama Two Cops. In 2018, Jo was cast in the action thriller film Hit-and-Run Squad in which he took a role as an antagonist.

=== 2019–2023: New agency, box office film Exit and Hospital Playlist ===
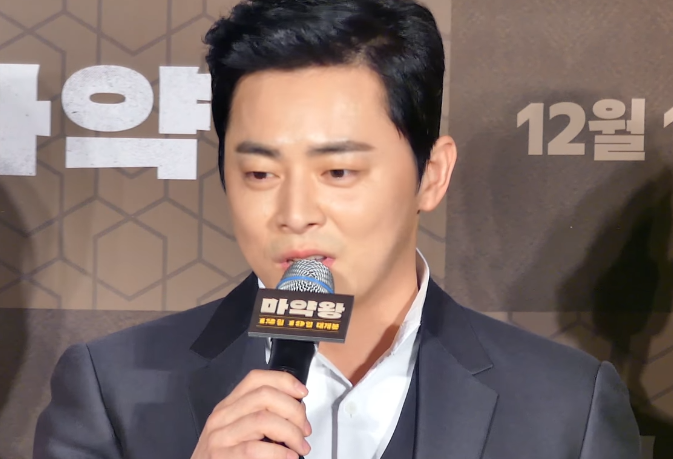
Jo in 2018

After the contract with Cultural Depot was terminated in February 2018, Jo Jung-suk worked as a free agent for a while. In March 2019, he signed an exclusive contract with Jam Entertainment, a new agency. Later, he took on the role of Baek Yi-gang, the eldest son of the notorious stranger Baekga in the historical drama Nokdu Flower.

In 2019, Jo starred alongside Im Yoon-ah in disaster action comedy film written and directed by Lee Sang-geun, Exit. The film follows the story of Yongnam, a young unemployed man, who attempts to reconnect with an old crush, but following a chain of events, they end up trying to escape from a mysterious white gas that threatens to engulf the entire Seoul district. Exit first premiered in South Korea on July 31, 2019. It was considered a box office success earning over US$69.5 million worldwide, becoming South Korea's third highest-grossing domestic film for 2019. Jo established himself as a box office actor with his acting skills and ticket power combined. He was nominated for the Best Actor Award at the Blue Dragon Film Awards.

In 2020, Jo starred as an assistant professor of general surgery, Lee Ik-jun, in the medical drama Hospital Playlist. The television series was created by director Shin Won-ho and writer Lee Woo-jung of the Reply series. It recorded an audience rating of 14.1% in the final episode, and received positive reviews throughout its run. In 2021, Jo reprised the role in the second season. Jo hosted the Jo Jung-suk Show at Mastercard Hall in Blue Square, Seoul, for two days on September 3 to 4, 2022.

=== 2024–present: Television, film, and music endeavors ===
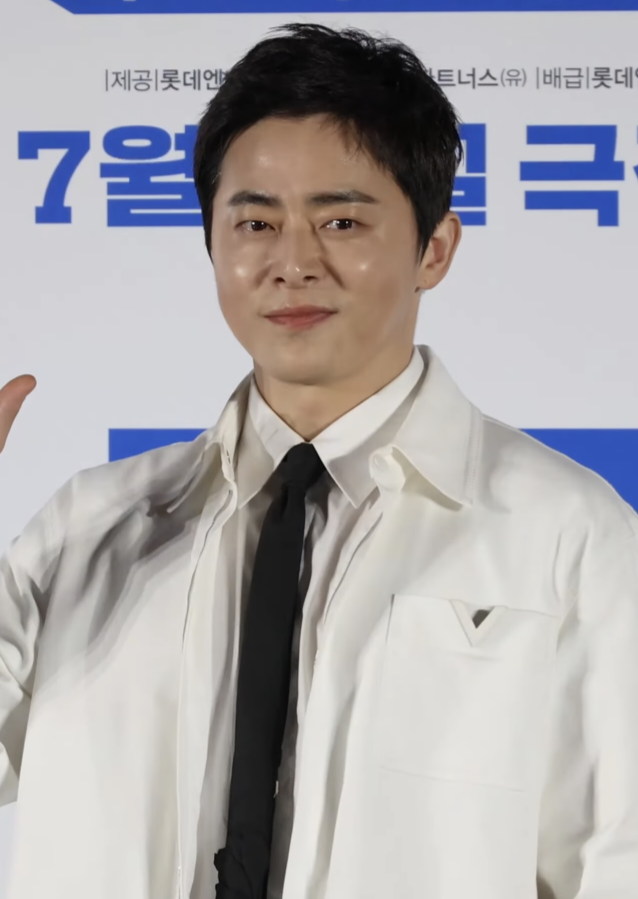
Jo in 2024

Several projects featuring Jo were released in 2024. Jo starred in the period drama Captivating the King, which aired on tvN from January 21 to March 3, 2024. Jo portrays Yi In, a king caught up in political power struggles that falls in love with the spy Kang Hee-soo, played by Shin Se-kyung. From March until June, Jo made a comeback the musical Hedwig, appearing after an eight-year hiatus. The musical ran at the Charlotte Theater, Seoul, and Jo's opening performance received positive reviews.

His return to film after five years was with Pilot, a comedy film released theatrically on July 31, 2024. Pilot is a remake of the 2012 Swedish film Cockpit, directed by Kim Han-gyul and also starring Lee Ju-myoung, Han Sun-hwa, and Shin Seung-ho. The film follows Han Jung-woo, a star pilot who becomes unemployed and succeeds in getting re-employed after assuming his sister identity. The legal drama film Land of Happiness, directed by Choo Chang-min, was released theatrically on August 14, 2024. Jo starred alongside Lee Sun-kyun and Yoo Jae-myung. The film is inspired by real-life figure Tae Yoon-ki, who served as the defense attorney for an Army colonel Park Heung-ju in the aftermath of the assassination of Park Chung Hee. It was released theatrically on August 14, 2024.

His Netflix original show A-list to Playlist (a wordplay referencing his drama Hospital Playlist) premiered on August 30. The project marked Jo's debut as a singer in his 20th year in the entertainment industry. The show followed Jo's songwriting journey, collaborations with various artists, and evaluations by a panel. It was directed by Yang Jung-woo, marking their first reunion since Youth Over Flowers Iceland (2016). The project was produced by his best friend, CEO Jeong Sang-hoon, with assistance from comedian Moon Sang-hoon. Several celebrity guests appeared, including IU, Dynamic Duo, and Jo's wife, the singer Gummy, marking Jo and Gummy's first TV collaboration. The show also featured his best friends, Jung Kyung-ho, who directed Jo's music video, which starred Kim Dae-myung and Gong Hyo-jin. The series concluded with a showcase on March 27, 2024, at Blue Square in Seoul, where Jo presented his songs and the album's concept.

In 2025, Jo returned to the silver screen with My Daughter Is a Zombie, adaptation of manhwa of the same name by Yun-chang Lee. Directed by Pil Gam-sung, the film starred Jo alongside Lee Jung-eun, Cho Yeo-jeong, Yoon Kyung-ho, and Choi Yu-ri. The plot depicts a father's struggle to protect his daughter, who has been infected with a zombie virus, as he seeks refuge in his mother's rural home. It was released theatrically on July 30, 2025 in South Korea. The film was commercially successful, grossing $38 million worldwide and becoming the highest-grossing South Korean film of 2025.

== Other ventures ==
=== Endorsements ===
Following the success of Architecture 101 and the drama The King 2 Hearts in 2012, Jo began receiving numerous advertising offers. His first television commercial was for LG U+. After the success of the film My Annoying Brother, Jo's prominence in the entertainment industry continued to grow. In 2016, he became the brand ambassador for an online English learning platform, and his promotional video for the platform gained significant attention on social media. Another notable commercial featuring Jo was his tuna advertisement alongside Son Na-eun.

In 2021, Jo served as the face of 12 different brands, promoting a diverse range of products, including mobile communications, credit cards, beverages, ramen, reading platforms, and masks. He ranked fourth in a CF revenue chart for that year.

=== Philanthropy ===
In 2019, newlyweds Jo and Gummy donated 30 million won to the Korea National Disaster Relief Association to aid in the recovery from the Goseong forest fire.

== Personal life ==
Jo has been in a relationship with singer Gummy since 2013. In June 2018, it was announced that the couple would marry in the fall. On October 8, 2018, it was revealed that the couple had already gotten married in a private ceremony with their families. On January 6, 2020, Gummy's agency confirmed that she was seven weeks pregnant with the couple's first child. On August 6, 2020, Jo and Gummy welcomed their first daughter. In July 2025, it was reported that Gummy was pregnant with the couple's second child. On January 14, 2026, the couple welcomed their second daughter.

== Filmography ==
Films

- Architecture 101 (2012)
- The Face Reader (2013)
- My Annoying Brother (2016)
- Exit (2019)
- Pilot (2024)
- Land of Happiness (2025)
- My Daughter Is a Zombie (2025)

Television series

- The King 2 Hearts (2012)
- You Are the Best! (2013)
- Oh My Ghost (2015)
- Don't Dare to Dream (2016)
- Nokdu Flower (2019)
- Hospital Playlist (Season 1, 2020; Season 2, 2021)
- Weak Hero (Season 2, 2025)

== Theater ==
=== Concerts ===
Year	Title		Role	Theater	Date	Ref.
Year	English	Korean	Role	Theater	Date	Ref.
2007	Hedwig Concert with John Cameron Mitchell	존 카메론 미첼과 함께하는 헤드윅 콘서트	Hedwig	Jamsil Indoor Gymnasium	May 27, 2007 – June 5, 2007	
2010	The Phantom of the Opera Commemorative Gala Concert	오페라의 유령 기념 갈라콘서트	Special appearance	Charlotte Theater	September 17, 2010 – September 19, 2010	
2011	Lee Young-mi concert	이영미 콘서트	Singer	Rolling hole	May 6, 2011	
2011	Welcome 5 SHOW - Anyang	어서5SHOW - 안양	Singer	Anyang Art Center, Main Hall (Gwanak Hall)	December 3, 2011	
2014	Musical Story Show with Lee Seok-jun: 10th Anniversary	뮤지컬 이야기쇼 이석준과 함께 10주년	Mickey	LG Art Center	May 26, 2014	
2017	Jo Jung-suk Fan Meeting <THE ROOM>	조정석 팬미팅 <THE ROOM>	Performer	Blue Square Samsung Card Hall	May 6, 2017 – May 7, 2017	
2022	Jo Jung-suk Show	조정석 쇼	Performer	Blue Square Mastercard Hall	September 3, 2022 – September 4, 2022	

=== Musicals ===
Year	Title		Role	Theater	Date	Ref.
Year	English	Korean	Role	Theater	Date	Ref.
2004	The Nutcracker	호두까기 인형	Tin robot/pink barberry/flower box	—N/a		
2005	Nunsense A-Men	남자넌센스 A-Men!	Sister Mary Leo	Dongsoong Art Center, Dongsoong Hall	March 18, 2005 – May 15, 2005	
2005	Grease	그리스	Roger	Dongsoong Art Center, Dongsoong Hall	June 1, 2005 – August 7, 2005	
2005	Grease	그리스	Roger	Dongsoong Art Center, Dongsoong Hall	August 19, 2005 – September 30, 2005	
2005–2006	Grease	그리스	Roger	Chungmu Art Center, Grand Theater	October 1, 2005 – January 1, 2006	
2006	Le Passe-Muraille	벽을 뚫는 남자	Newspaper Seller	CJ Towol Theater, Seoul Arts Center	February 28, 2006 – April 2, 2006	
2006	You're a Good Man, Charlie Brown	찰리브라운	Charlie Brown	Chungmu Art Center, Middle Theater Black	April 6, 2006 – June 25, 2006	
2006	The Kingdom of the Wind	바람의 나라	Ho-dong	CJ Towol Theater, Seoul Arts Center	July 14, 2006 – July 21, 2006	
2006–2007	Hedwig and the Angry Inch	헤드윅	Hedwig	Daehangno SH Art Hall	October 14, 2006 – February 17, 2007	
2007	All Shook Up	올슉업	Chad	Chungmu Art Center, Grand Theater	January 30, 2007 – April 22, 2007	
2007	First Love	첫사랑	Hae-su	Daehakro Tiom 1 Hall	March 27, 2007 – June 17, 2007	
2007	Pump Boys and Dinettes	펌프보이즈	Jim	JTN Art Hall, 2nd Hall	August 4, 2007 – October 14, 2007	
2007–2008	Le Passe-Muraille	벽을 뚫는 남자	Newsvendor	Dongsoong Art Center, Dongsoong Hall	November 17, 2007 – February 3, 2008	
2008	Evil Dead	이블데드	Ash	Chungmu Art Center, Middle Theater Black	March 18, 2008 – June 15, 2008	
2008	Hedwig and the Angry Inch	헤드윅	Hedwig	KT&G Sangsangmadang, Daechi Art Hall	June 27, 2008 – January 11, 2009	
2008	Organ in My Heart	내 마음의 풍금	Kang Dong-soo	Hoam Art Hall	July 22, 2008 – September 12, 2008	
2008	Organ in My Heart	내 마음의 풍금	Kang Dong-soo	Daegu Opera House	September 20, 2008 – September 21, 2008	
2008	Organ in My Heart	내 마음의 풍금	Kang Dong-soo	Daejeon Arts Center, Art Hall	September 25, 2008 – September 27, 2008	
2008	Janggeum the Great	대장금	Jo Gwang-jo	Gyeonghuigung Seungjeongjeon	September 5, 2008 – October 12, 2008	
2009–2010	Spring Awakening	스프링 어웨이크닝	Moritz	Doosan Art Center, Yeongang Hall	June 30, 2009 – January 10, 2010	
2011	Hedwig and the Angry Inch	헤드윅	Hedwig	KT&G Sangsangmadang, Daechi Art Hall	May 14, 2011 – August 21, 2011	
2011	Hedwig and the Angry Inch	헤드윅	Hedwig	Geumjeong Cultural Center, Main Hall (Geumbit Nuri Hall), Busan	September 2, 2011 – September 4, 2011	
2014	Blood Brothers	블러드 브라더스	Mickey	Hongik University Daehakro Art Center	June 27, 2014 – September 14, 2014	
2016	Hedwig and the Angry Inch	헤드윅	Hedwig	Hongik University Daehakro Art Center, Main Theater	March 1, 2016 – June 5, 2016	
2018	Amadeus	아마데우스	Wolfgang Amadeus Mozart	Gwanglim Art Center BBCH Hall	February 27, 2018 – April 29, 2018	
2024	Hedwig and the Angry Inch	헤드윅	Hedwig	Charlotte Theater	March 22, 2024 – June 23, 2024	

=== Plays ===
Year	Title		Role	Venue	Date	Ref.
Year	English	Korean	Role	Venue	Date	Ref.
2009	The Island	아일랜드	John	CJ Azit Daehakro (formerly SM Art Hall)	February 14, 2009 – April 5, 2009	
2010–2011	True West	트루웨스트	Austin	Plus Theater (formerly Culture Space N.U.)	November 26, 2010 – May 1, 2011	
2011	The Vagina Monologues	버자이너 모놀로그	Guest appearance	Chungmu Art Hall Blue Theater	December 2 to January 2012	

== Discography ==
=== Soundtrack appearances ===
Title	Year	Peak chart position		Sales	Album
Title	Year	Circle	Hot	Sales	Album
"Blue Sleeves"	2012	—	—	N/A	Almost Che OST
"Dreams Come True"	2012	—	—	N/A	What's Up OST
"Might Gonna"	2012	—	—	N/A	What's Up OST
"With You"	2012	—	—	N/A	What's Up OST
"I Completely Love You"	2013	—	—	N/A	You Are the Best! OST
"My Love, My Bride" (with Shin Min-a)	2014	—	—	N/A	My Love, My Bride OST
"Gimme a Chocolate"	2015	—	—	N/A	Oh My Ghost OST
"Don't Worry" (with D.O.)	2016	100	—	KOR: 19,498	My Annoying Brother OST
"Aloha"	2020	1	1	N/A	Hospital Playlist OST
"I Like You"	2021	8	10	N/A	Hospital Playlist 2 OST

=== Compilation appearances ===
Title	Year	Album
"Sugar Daddy" "Angry Inch"	2006	Hedwig and the Angry Inch cast recording
"첫사랑" "멋진키스" "아버지가 좋아요" "너의 바다는" "하지만 나는 안가" "해수의 바다" "아직 늦지 않았어" "사랑해 언제까지나"	2007	First Love cast recording
"내 마음의 풍금" "나의 사랑 수정(Love Thema)" "웃는이유" "나비의 꿈" "아가씨" "봄이다 그치" "커피향" "응급처치" "소풍" "때려쳐" "왜" "홍연이 안 왔어요" "Springtime"	2008	Organ in My Heart cast recording
"Tear Me Down" "Wig in a Box"	2011	Hedwig and the Angry Inch cast recording
