= My Daughter Is a Zombie =

2018–2020 South Korean webtoon

- Manhwa cover of My Daughter Is a Zombie volume 1

좀비딸 Jombi ttal
- Genre: Comedy
- Author: Yun-chang Lee
- Webtoon service: Naver Webtoon (Korean); Line Webtoon (English)
- Original run: August 22, 2018 – June 16, 2020
- Volumes: 7

My Daughter Is a Zombie
- Country of origin: South Korea
- Original language: Korean
- No. of episodes: 26

Production
- Production companies: EBS; DURUFIX

Original release
- Network: EBS
- Release: April 3 – June 26, 2022

My Daughter Is a Zombie (Korean: 좀비딸) is a South Korean manhwa released as a webtoon written and illustrated by Yun-chang Lee. It was serialized via Naver Corporation's webtoon platform Naver Webtoon from August 2018 to June 2020, with the individual chapters collected and published into seven volumes.

A South Korean animated series adaptation by EBS and DURUFIX aired from April 3 to June 26, 2022, on EBS. A live-action film adaptation was released in July 2025.

== Manhwa ==
Yun-chang Lee launched My Daughter Is a Zombie in Naver's webtoon platform Naver Webtoon on August 22, 2018.

=== Volume list ===
No.	Korean release date	Korean ISBN
1	August 9, 2022	979-1-16-779123-8
2	August 9, 2022	979-1-16-779124-5
3	August 9, 2022	979-1-16-779125-2
4	August 9, 2022	979-1-16-779126-9
5	August 9, 2022	979-1-16-779127-6
6	August 9, 2022	979-1-16-779128-3
7	August 9, 2022	979-1-16-779129-0

== Adaptations ==
=== Animated series ===
A South Korean animated series based on webtoon by EBS and DURUFIX aired from April 3 to June 26, 2022, on EBS.

=== Live-action film ===
A South Korean live-action of the same name based on webtoon is ready for release on July 30, 2025, with the main characters of Lee Jeong-hwan, Kim Bam-sun, Shin Yeon-hwa, Jo Dong-bae, and Lee Su-a being played by Jo Jung-suk, Lee Jung-eun, Cho Yeo-jeong, Yoon Kyung-ho, and Choi Yu-ri, respectively.
