= Almost Che =

- Film poster
- Directed by: Yook Sang-hyo
- Written by: Yook Sang-hyo
- Produced by: Lee Se-young
- Starring: Kim In-kwon; Yoo Da-in; Jo Jeong-seok
- Production company: Space M
- Distributed by: Lotte Entertainment
- Release date: October 25, 2012 (South Korea)
- Running time: 113 minutes
- Country: South Korea
- Language: Korean

Almost Che (also known as Iron Dae-oh: The Nation's Iron Bag!, Korean: 강철대오: 구국의 철가방; RR: Gangcheoldaeoh: Googookeui Cheolgabang) is a 2012 South Korean comedy film directed and written by Yook Sang-hyo. It was released on October 25, 2012.

== Cast ==
- Kim In-kwon as Kang Dae-oh
- Yoo Da-in as Seo Ye-rin
- Jo Jung-suk as Hwang Yeong-min
- Park Chul-min as Hwang Bi-hong
- Kwon Hyun-sang as Nam-jeong
- Kim Ki-bang as Bong-soo
- Oh Hee-joon as Riot police
- Shin Hyun-been as Site reporter (Cameo)
- Cha Chung-hwa as Dong-sook
- Choi Min as Yook Jung-yeob
