= What's Up (TV series) =

2011–2012 South Korean television series

- Promotional poster
- Genre: Musical; Drama
- Created by: MBN Production plan
- Written by: Song Ji-na
- Directed by: Jang Mi-ja; Song Ji-won
- Starring: Lim Ju-hwan; Daesung; Lim Ju-eun; Oh Man-seok; Jang Hee-jin; Kim Ji-won; Jo Jung-suk
- Country of origin: South Korea
- Original language: Korean
- No. of episodes: 20

Production
- Executive producer: Min Jeong-hoon
- Producers: Seo Sang-wook; Song Hyun-joo
- Running time: 60 minutes
- Production company: Zero Plus

Original release
- Network: MBN
- Release: December 3, 2011 – February 5, 2012

What's Up (Korean: 왓츠업) is a 2011 South Korean television series starring Lim Ju-hwan, Kang Dae-sung, Lim Ju-eun, Oh Man-seok, Jang Hee-jin, Kim Ji-won and Jo Jung-suk. It aired on Saturdays to Sundays at 23:00 on MBN starting from December 3, 2011, and ended on February 5, 2012. This series is about the dreams, passions, and love of twenty-year-old youths, in a university musical department.

== Synopsis ==
Jae-Hun (Lim Ju-Hwan) is a high school dropout who roams the streets at night with his two best friends. One day, his friends try steal from a drunk guy without Jae-Hun and are caught by the police. He tries to rescue his friends and gets involved in an accident that leads to the death of a stranger. A while later, he decides to go to university to study acting. Park Tae Yi (Kim Ji-Won) comes to Seoul to take an audition for entry into in the university. She lives in the countryside with her grandfather, and inherited her musical talents from her father.

Ha Do Sung (Daesung) is the famous rock star Hades who presents himself by hiding his identity through a mask. Because of his secret family background, Do-Sung can't reveal his real identity, so he tries to live quietly without drawing attention to himself and joins the university.

Kim Byeong Gun (Jo Jung-suk) is the odd one out in his family of businessmen, wishing to pursue a career in musicals - despite his fear of performing in front of others. Eun Chae Young (Jang Hee-jin) is the experienced actress who wants to prove that she has talent and not just a pretty face. Already Oh Doo Ri (Lim Ju-eun), is a talented actress who prefers to spend her time playing first-person shooting computer games than rehearsing.

These young adults end up together in the musical department of Haneul Arts University, and find themselves under the guidance of unconventional professor Sunwoo Young (Oh Man-seok). So they get a chance to learn what it is to be a 'star,' and to prove to the people around them that they can succeed in their chosen path.

== Cast ==
=== Main ===
- Lim Ju-hwan as Jang Jae-hun
- Daesung as Ha Do-sung
- Lim Ju-eun as Oh Doo-ri
- Oh Man-seok as Sun Woo-young
- Jang Hee-jin as Eun Chae-young
- Kim Ji-won as Park Tae-yi
- Jo Jung-suk as Kim Byung-gun
- Yang Ji-won as Yang Ji-eun

=== Supporting ===
- Kim Sung-ryung as Ha In-young, Do Sung's mom
- Kim Chang-wan as Tae-yi's dad
- Lee Ho-young as Detective Cho
- Jin Yi-han as Director Kang
- Song Ok-sook as Jae-hun's mom
- Kim Mi-kyung as Yang Soo-ung
- Lee Soo-hyuk as Lee Soo-in
- Yang Hee-kyung as Doo-ri's mom
- Han Ye-won as Yeon-joo
- Kim Ga-eun as Ga-young
- Kwon Young-don as one of the twins
- Kwon Young-deuk as one of the twins

=== Special appearance ===
- Ham Jin-sung as Policeman
- Jung Young-sook as Chancellor
- Baek Jae-jin as Mr. Bae
- Kim Jong-moon as Student

== Production ==
Written by Song Ji-na, What's Up was a pre-produced serie before airing and your filming began in July 2010. Its premiere was scheduled to air by SBS on Mondays and Tuesdays at 21:00, starting March 2011 replacing Paradise Ranch. However, SBS announced the cancellation of the 21:00 time slot for dramas.

On October 24, it was revealed that the filming of What's Up was completed, and it was confirmed that the title would be aired on television cable MBN, with expected date the scheduled for early December 2011 or the beginning of 2012.
