= Nokdu Flower =

2019 South Korean television series

- Promotional poster
- Hangul: 녹두꽃
- Lit.: Mung Bean Flower
- RR: Nokdukkot
- MR: Noktukkot
- Genre: Historical period drama
- Written by: Jeong Hyun-min
- Directed by: Shin Kyung-soo
- Starring: Jo Jung-suk; Yoon Shi-yoon; Han Ye-ri
- Music by: Kim Soo-jin
- Country of origin: South Korea
- Original language: Korean
- No. of episodes: 48 (Note: In order to circumvent Korean laws that prevent commercial breaks in the middle of an episode, what would previously have been aired as single 70 minute episodes are now being repackaged as two 35 minute episodes, with two episodes being shown each night with a commercial break between the two.)

Production
- Executive producers: Park Myung-soo; SBS Drama
- Camera setup: Single-camera
- Running time: 35 minutes
- Production company: C-JeS Entertainment
- Budget: ₩20 billion

Original release
- Network: SBS TV
- Release: April 26 – July 13, 2019

Nokdu Flower (Korean: 녹두꽃; RR: Nokdukkot) is a 2019 South Korean television series starring Jo Jung-suk, Yoon Shi-yoon and Han Ye-ri. It aired from April 26 to July 13, 2019 on SBS TV.

== Synopsis ==
The series tells the story of two half-brothers from separate mothers but share the same father who experienced different upbringings due to their respective mothers' different social statuses. The brothers find themselves fighting on the opposite sides of the Battle of Ugeumchi, which took place in 1894 during the Donghak Peasant Revolution. Their relationship is tested as both find themselves questioning their loyalties and values.

== Cast ==
=== Main ===
- Jo Jung-suk as Baek Yi-kang, the illegitimate older son who was born out of wedlock as the son of his father's wife's handmaid and is discriminated against by his family due to his mother's low status.
  - Park Sang-hoon as young Baek Yi-kang
- Yoon Shi-yoon as Baek Yi-hyun, the legitimate younger son who received an elite education in Japan and is preparing for the national civil service exam.
- Han Ye-ri as Song Ja-in, a daughter of an elite family who is charismatic and strong-minded. She also runs a shop where she trades goods for money.

=== Supporting ===
- Park Hyuk-kwon as Baek Ga, Yi-kang and Yi-hyun's father who is a notorious and wealthy government official in the town of Gobu. He is greedy for reputation due to his inferiority complex about his low birth.
- Min Sung-wook as Choi Kyung-seon, Yi-kang's ally who is the commander of the vanguard unit of a rebel army.
- Choi Moo-sung as Jeon Bongjun, the owner of a local apothecary who becomes the revolutionary leader.
- Kim Sang-ho as Choi Deok-gi
- Choi Won-young as Hwang Seok-ju
- Jo Hyun-sik as Eok-soe
- Park Gyu-young as Hwang Myung-shim
- Byung Hun as Beon Gae
- Shim Wan-joon as Jae-yun
- Noh Haeng-ha as Beo-deul, sniper and Kyung Seon's unit.
- Ahn Gil-kang as Hae Seung, monk and Kyung Seon's unit.
- Seo Young-hee as Yoo Wol, Yi-kang's mother.
- Hwang Young-hee as Chae Jung-shil, Yi-hyun's mother.
- Baek Eun-hye as Baek Yi-hwa, Yi-hyun's sister.
- Moon Won-joo as Kim Dang-son, Yi-hwa's husband.
- Park Ji-il as Song Bong-gil
- Park Ji-hwan as Kim Ga
- Son Woo-hyeon as Lee Kyu-tae

=== Special appearance ===
- Park Hoon as Kim Chang-soo, Donghak leader. (Ep. 48)
- Choi Dae-hoon

== Production ==
Early working title of the series is Ugeumchi (Korean: 우금티).

== Ratings ==
Ep.	Broadcast date	Average audience share		
Ep.	Broadcast date	Nielsen Korea		TNmS
Ep.	Broadcast date	Nationwide	Seoul	Nationwide
1	April 26, 2019	8.6% (9th)	10.1% (8th)	7.2%
2	April 26, 2019	11.5% (5th)	13.2% (3rd)	9.5%
3	April 27, 2019	6.5% (15th)	7.3% (12th)	N/A
4	April 27, 2019	8.6% (9th)	9.5% (6th)	6.8%
5	May 3, 2019	6.6% (14th)	7.2% (12th)	6.7%
6	May 3, 2019	8.8% (6th)	9.8% (5th)	8.3%
7	May 4, 2019	6.8% (9th)	8.1% (6th)	6.2%
8	May 4, 2019	8.1% (6th)	9.4% (3rd)	7.4%
9	May 10, 2019	7.4% (9th)	8.6% (8th)	6.8%
10	May 10, 2019	8.6% (7th)	9.9% (5th)	7.7%
11	May 11, 2019	8.1% (6th)	9.9% (5th)	7.4%
12	May 11, 2019	9.1% (4th)	10.9% (3rd)	8.0%
13	May 17, 2019	7.0% (13th)	8.2% (10th)	7.0%
14	May 17, 2019	8.4% (7th)	9.5% (6th)	8.2%
15	May 18, 2019	6.5% (14th)	7.4% (9th)	6.3%
16	May 18, 2019	7.7% (8th)	8.6% (5th)	6.8%
17	May 24, 2019	6.0% (14th)	7.1% (11th)	6.3%
18	May 24, 2019	7.1% (10th)	8.3% (10th)	7.2%
19	May 25, 2019	6.7% (10th)	7.9% (5th)	6.2%
20	May 25, 2019	7.4% (6th)	8.7% (4th)	6.6%
21	May 31, 2019	6.1% (14th)	6.7% (12th)	5.8%
22	May 31, 2019	6.9% (11th)	7.9% (9th)	6.5%
23	June 1, 2019	5.7% (20th)	6.4% (11th)	5.8%
24	June 1, 2019	6.7% (10th)	7.4% (5th)	N/A
25	June 7, 2019	6.8% (12th)	7.8% (9th)	6.6%
26	June 7, 2019	7.5% (11th)	8.4% (7th)	7.0%
27	June 8, 2019	4.6% (NR)	5.7% (15th)	N/A
28	June 8, 2019	5.7% (17th)	6.7% (8th)	N/A
29	June 14, 2019	5.2% (17th)	5.8% (14th)	N/A
30	June 14, 2019	6.5% (13th)	7.7% (11th)	5.9%
31	June 15, 2019	5.6% (20th)	6.2% (15th)	N/A
32	June 15, 2019	7.0% (11th)	7.9% (8th)	N/A
33	June 21, 2019	5.1% (18th)	6.3% (13th)	5.0%
34	June 21, 2019	6.0% (14th)	7.2% (11th)	5.8%
35	June 22, 2019	4.5% (NR)	N/A	N/A
36	June 22, 2019	6.2% (12th)	7.0% (7th)	N/A
37	June 28, 2019	5.1% (17th)	5.8% (14th)	5.6%
38	June 28, 2019	5.9% (14th)	6.6% (11th)	6.4%
39	June 29, 2019	4.0% (NR)	N/A	N/A
40	June 29, 2019	5.3% (NR)	6.0% (15th)	N/A
41	July 5, 2019	4.9% (18th)	5.7% (14th)	4.8%
42	July 5, 2019	5.9% (14th)	7.1% (10th)	5.5%
43	July 6, 2019	4.6% (NR)	5.2% (17th)	N/A
44	July 6, 2019	6.5% (10th)	6.9% (6th)	6.2%
45	July 12, 2019	4.7% (20th)	5.3% (16th)	N/A
46	July 12, 2019	6.0% (13th)	6.7% (12th)	N/A
47	July 13, 2019	6.0% (13th)	7.2% (10th)	N/A
48	July 13, 2019	8.1% (7th)	9.1% (4th)	N/A
Average		6.6%	— (Note: Due to some unpublished ratings, the exact average rating is unknown.)	—
In the table above, the blue numbers represent the lowest ratings and the red numbers represent the highest ratings.; N/A denotes that the rating is not known.; NR denotes that the drama did not rank in the top 20 daily programs on that date.

== Awards and nominations ==
Year	Award	Category	Recipient	Result	Ref.
2019	12th Korea Drama Awards	Grand Prize (Daesang)	Jo Jung-suk	Nominated	
2019	32nd Korean Broadcasting Writers' Awards	Writer Award (Drama Division)	Jeong Hyun-min	Won	
2019	SBS Drama Awards	Grand Prize (Daesang)	Jo Jung-suk	Nominated	
2019	SBS Drama Awards	Producer Award	Jo Jung-suk	Nominated	
2019	SBS Drama Awards	Producer Award	Han Ye-ri	Nominated	
2019	SBS Drama Awards	Top Excellence Award, Actor in a Mid-Length Drama	Jo Jung-suk	Won	
2019	SBS Drama Awards	Excellence Award, Actor in a Mid-Length Drama	Yoon Shi-yoon	Nominated	
2019	SBS Drama Awards	Excellence Award, Actor in a Mid-Length Drama	Choi Moo-sung	Nominated	
2019	SBS Drama Awards	Excellence Award, Actress in a Mid-Length Drama	Han Ye-ri	Won	
2019	SBS Drama Awards	Best Supporting Team	Ahn Gil-kang, Jung Kyu-soo, No Haeng-na and Byung Hun	Nominated	
2019	SBS Drama Awards	Best Couple Award	Jo Jung-suk and Han Ye-ri	Nominated	
