= The King 2 Hearts =

2012 South Korean television series

- Promotional poster
- Also known as: King2Hearts
- Genre: Romance; Drama; Action
- Written by: Hong Jin-ah
- Directed by: Lee Jae-kyoo; Jung Dae-yoon
- Starring: Ha Ji-won; Lee Seung-gi
- Country of origin: South Korea
- Original language: Korean
- No. of episodes: 20

Production
- Running time: 60 minutes
- Production company: Kim Jong-hak Production

Original release
- Network: MBC TV
- Release: March 21 – May 24, 2012

The King 2 Hearts (Korean: 더킹 투하츠) is a 2012 South Korean television series, starring Ha Ji-won and Lee Seung-gi in the leading roles. It is about a South Korean crown prince who falls in love with a North Korean special agent. The series aired on MBC from March 21 to May 24, 2012, on Wednesdays and Thursdays at 21:55 for 20 episodes.

== Synopsis ==
Set in an alternate reality, modern-day South Korea is governed by a constitutional monarchy descended from the Joseon dynasty. Lee Jae-ha (Lee Seung-gi) is a handsome yet materialistic crown prince who doesn't care about politics and feels total reluctance to being the second in line to the throne. Lee Jae-kang (Lee Sung-min), the current king, tricks him into joining a joint military collaboration with North Korea as a means to help "make him grow up."

Meanwhile, Kim Hang-ah (Ha Ji-won) is a North Korean Special Forces officer who is also the daughter of a high ranking North Korean military official. Both Jae-ha and Hang-ah meet at the joint military training, a crucial part in establishing friendly relations between the two separate countries. Although the two are initially antagonistic towards each other, Jae-ha unwittingly sparks a friendship with Hang-ah and he subsequently falls in love with her. Soon, an arranged marriage is set up between the two and they eventually become engaged. While they attempt to set their differences aside and build a growing relationship, things suddenly take a turn for the worse when King Jae-kang and his wife are assassinated by the devious and notorious terrorist group, Club M, led by John Mayer/Kim Bong-gu (Yoon Je-moon), a mysterious magician who is obsessed with eliminating the royal family and plans to rule in their stead. Now crowned the new King of South Korea, Jae-ha must learn to be responsible and protect the country before it is too late.

== Cast ==
=== Main characters ===
- Ha Ji-won as Captain Kim Hang-ah

The female protagonist - A North Korean Special Forces officer and instructor known in the military to be an "Iron Lady" with absolutely no femininity within her. She is the only daughter of the Deputy Minister of the North Korean Ministry of Unification. Although tough and fearsome on the surface, at heart she is a shy maiden who struggles to find her companion for life. After a few incidents involving her and the South Korean prince ("the archenemy of the socialist state and the people"), Jae-ha falls in love with her during the training mission. After Prince Jae-ha confesses his feelings for her on TV, Hang-ah goes to the South to punish him for playing with her feelings.

- Lee Seung-gi as Prince Lee Jae-ha (later King Jae-ha)
  - Kang Han-byeol as young Jae-ha

The male protagonist - The Crown Prince of South Korea with an assumed IQ of 187. An arrogant and irresponsible individual who surprisingly displays a lot of charisma. Unknown to many, Jae-ha's arrogance and behavior was a front so that he could avoid having to meet and befriend people - he had difficulty finding "real friends" in school once his royal status became known. When his brother, King Jae-kang, ascended to the throne, he assumed that he could live an indulgent "playboy" lifestyle for the rest of his life. As his two years of conscripted service comes to a close, he is tricked by his brother into participating in a joint military exercise between North and South Korea, organized by the King and the North Korean Military Command. King Jae-kang also used this as an opportunity to teach his brother a lesson and "help him grow up". However, his personality does not sit well with his teammates, who eventually see him as a royal pain. As a means to whip him into shape, North Korean Representative and Captain Kim Hang-ah "threatens" him into submission right after their first encounter.

- Jo Jung-suk as Eun Shi-kyung

The son of the king's chief adviser Eun Kyu-tae, he is a South Korean military officer who participates in the joint collaboration. Later promoted to the Royal Guard, he is absolutely loyal and strict by nature, initially detested by Prince Jae-ha due to his "old-fashioned"-ness resembling King Jae-kang. He is romantically interested in Princess Jae-shin.

- Yoon Je-moon as Kim Bong-gu (John Mayer)

The series antagonist, a magician by day, an arms dealer, a terrorist mastermind, and an assassin by night. He decides to assassinate the South Korean king after peace talks are established between both sides of 38th Parallel which compromised the interest of his weapons business. He also has an even darker agenda waiting to be revealed.

- Lee Yoon-ji as Princess Lee Jae-shin

The Princess of South Korea. Prince Jae-ha and King Jae-kang's younger sister. A royal by day and an underground rock band singer by night. She has a somewhat naughty sense of humor, which once got her arrested by Eun Shi-kyung (not knowing her true identity) when she dressed down and made fun of her royal self. However, she is paralyzed after her brother Jae-kang's death and her kidnapping.

=== Supporting characters ===
- Lee Sung-min as Lee Jae-kang (the King)
  - Park Gun-woo as young Jae-kang

Jae-ha's and Jae-shin's oldest brother is the King of South Korea, a caring and responsible man to both the Royal Family and the rest of the country. After witnessing the collapse of the Berlin Wall on TV during childhood, he was inspired and later organized a plan to join the North and South Korean militaries in a world-scale competition between military officers. He also sent Jae-ha into the team to be trained with the hope of transforming him into one who can be sufficiently responsible as a member of the Royal Family. He was assassinated along with his wife Queen Hyun-joo during their vacation. It was later revealed that one of his deepest desires in life is to retire from the throne and go work as a farmer in the countryside.

- Youn Yuh-jung as Bang Yang-seon (the Queen Mother)

The Queen Mother, mother of King Jae-kang, Prince (later King) Jae-ha and Princess Jae-shin. She was the first commoner-born Queen of South Korea. She knows the secret recipe of an ancient Korean clam soup that the members of the Royal Family like; only Korean queens are entrusted with this recipe. Even though she initially disliked Hang-ah (who was a North Korean), she warmed up to Hang-ah after seeing her take care of Princess Jae-shin.

- Lee Soon-jae as Eun Kyu-tae

The palace chief adviser who plays a key role in the scheme plotted against the South Korean royalty by John Meyer.

- Jung Man-sik as Rhee Kang-seok

A North Korean military man who participates in the join collaboration. Though he publicly denounces South Korean pop groups like Girls' Generation, he secretly admires their music and get outraged when someone discover this side of his character. Skilled in a variety of Asian martial arts, he is seen precisely throwing dart-knives and using a Rocket-propelled grenade as a spear.

- Kwon Hyun-sang as Yeom Dong-ha

A South Korean military man who participates in the joint collaboration. Later he is promoted to the Royal Guard. He offers advice to Prince Jae-ha in several schemes involving the capture of Hang-ah's heart.

- Choi Kwon as Kwon Young-bae

A North Korean military man who participates in the joint collaboration. He suggested a group photo between North and South Korean officers during the farewell party after the training mission. It is later revealed that he is a skilled sniper and his marksmanship was proven useful in saving King Jae-ha when he was threatened by a North Korean terrorist.

- Lee Do-kyung as Kim Nam-il

Deputy Minister of the North Korean Ministry of Unification and Captain Kim Hang-ah's father. He is concerned about the fact that his daughter is having a hard time trying to get married. When Hang-ah becomes the target of public suspicion for King Jae-kang's death, he quickly revealed the North Korean investigation result to King Jae-ha. Although constantly upset by Jae-ha's attitude towards his daughter, he manages to cast his political influence within the North Korean command in order to save him from the radical faction within the Korean People's Army.

- Jeon Gook-hwan as Hyun Myung-ho

Chairman of the North Korean Supreme Commission of People (a.k.a. the Head of State). He had secretly met the South Korean ambassador concerning the fact that there was a black box of coal ashes and a "North Korean model" smart phone found at the death site of the late King Jae-kang. While he does not like King Jae-ha, he is reluctant to fight against him.

- Yeom Dong-hyun as Park Ho-chul

Prime minister of South Korea. He was threatened by King Jae-ha that if he does not publicly reveal the investigation results for the late King Jae-kang's death, he would not only vote against passing the bill to raise the salary of government officials, but he would use his royal power to veto it instead.

- Lee Yeon-kyung as Park Hyun-joo (the Queen)

The wife of King Jae-kang and sister-in-law to Jae-ha and Jae-shin. She loves her husband deeply and dreams about having a lot of kids someday.

== Soundtrack ==
The King 2 Hearts soundtrack was released in five parts every week starting from March 28, 2012, and concluding on May 10, 2012.

Part 1 (Release Date: March 28, 2012)
No.	Title	Artist	Length
1.	"미치게 보고 싶은" (Missing You Like Crazy)	Kim Tae-yeon	3:35

Part 2 (Release Date: April 11, 2012)
No.	Title	Artist	Length
1.	"사랑이 운다" (Love Is Crying)	K.Will	4:00

Part 3 (Release Date: April 25, 2012)
No.	Title	Artist	Length
1.	"처음사랑" (First Love)	Lee Yoon-ji	4:08
2.	"말못하죠" (Can't Say)	J-Min	3:54
3.	"내맘대로 살꺼야" (I'll Live My Way)	Super Kidd	3:08

Part 4 (Release Date: May 2, 2012)
No.	Title	Artist	Length
1.	"오직 너만을" (Only You)	Hyun-seong	4:17

Full Album (Release Date: May 10, 2012)
No.	Title	Artist	Length
1.	"더 킹" (The King)	Various Artists	1:02
2.	"미치게 보고 싶은" (Missing You Like Crazy)	Kim Tae-yeon	3:35
3.	"사랑이 운다" (Love Is Crying)	K.Will	4:00
4.	"말못하죠" (Can't Say)	J-Min	3:54
5.	"오직 너만을" (Only You)	Hyun-seong	4:17
6.	"내맘대로 살꺼야" (I'll Live My Way)	Super Kidd	3:08
7.	"처음사랑" (First Love)	Lee Yoon-ji	4:08
8.	"더킹 사랑과 감동" (The King's Love and Emotion)	Various Artists	4:24
9.	"항아의 꿈" (Hang-ah's Dream)	Various Artists	2:52
10.	"Dead Line"	Various Artists	1:24
11.	"두 개의 심장" (Two Hearts)	Various Artists	2:13
12.	"함께…" (Together...)	Various Artists	3:43
13.	"특수임무" (Special Mission)	Various Artists	2:06
14.	"슬픈 하늘" (Sad Sky)	Various Artists	2:37
15.	"웃는날" (Smiling Day)	Various Artists	2:31
16.	"아픈 사랑" (Painful Love)	Various Artists	3:05
17.	"Lovely Yours"	Various Artists	3:52
18.	"Breach"	Various Artists	3:24
19.	"눈을 감으면" (If I Close My Eyes)	Various Artists	2:22
20.	"타는 마음" (Flaming Heart)	Various Artists	2:31
21.	"Greasy"	Various Artists	1:56
22.	"Lazy"	Various Artists	1:57
23.	"Black Message"	Various Artists	3:19
24.	"Bright Day"	Various Artists	1:59
25.	"새로운 시작" (New Start)	Various Artists	1:55

== Ratings ==
In the table below, the blue numbers represent the lowest ratings and the red numbers represent the highest ratings.

Episode #	Original Airdate	AGB Ratings		TNmS Ratings	
Episode #	Original Airdate	Average audience share			
Episode #	Original Airdate	Entire Country	Seoul National Capital Area	Entire Country	Seoul National Capital Area
1	March 21, 2012	16.2%	18.8%	16.5%	19.3%
2	March 22, 2012	16.5%	18.3%	16.6%	19.3%
3	March 28, 2012	14.5%	17.1%	14.2%	16.2%
4	March 29, 2012	14.6%	17.4%	15.6%	17.9%
5	April 4, 2012	13.5%	15.8%	12.1%	14.1%
6	April 5, 2012	12.1%	14.3%	12.2%	14.7%
7	April 12, 2012	11.0%	12.6%	10.7%	13.1%
8	April 12, 2012	12.5%	14.4%	12.3%	14.8%
9	April 18, 2012	10.8%	12.6%	9.7%	11.2%
10	April 19, 2012	10.5%	11.9%	10.5%	12.3%
11	April 25, 2012	11.3%	12.9%	11.2%	13.7%
12	April 26, 2012	10.7%	12.5%	10.0%	11.8%
13	May 2, 2012	11.3%	13.3%	10.5%	13.3%
14	May 3, 2012	11.1%	13.0%	11.1%	14.2%
15	May 9, 2012	11.1%	12.5%	11.2%	13.3%
16	May 10, 2012	10.5%	11.9%	10.2%	12.6%
17	May 16, 2012	10.2%	11.7%	10.8%	14.0%
18	May 17, 2012	11.2%	13.0%	11.2%	14.2%
19	May 23, 2012	12.1%	13.9%	12.5%	15.9%
20	May 24, 2012	11.8%	14.3%	10.4%	13.6%
Average		12.2%	14.1%	12.0%	14.5%

== Awards and nominations ==
Year	Award	Category	Recipient	Result
2012	6th Mnet 20's Choice Awards	20's Drama Actor	Lee Seung-gi	Nominated
2012	6th Mnet 20's Choice Awards	20's Drama Actress	Ha Ji-won	Nominated
2012	6th Mnet 20's Choice Awards	20's Booming Star	Jo Jung-suk	Won
2012	7th Seoul International Drama Awards	Best Actress	Ha Ji-won	Nominated
2012	7th Seoul International Drama Awards	Outstanding Korean Drama (Silver Bird Prize)	The King 2 Hearts	Won
2012	7th Seoul International Drama Awards	Outstanding Korean Actor	Lee Seung-gi	Nominated
2012	7th Seoul International Drama Awards	Outstanding Korean Actress	Ha Ji-won	Nominated
2012	7th Seoul International Drama Awards	Outstanding Korean Drama OST	"Missing You Like Crazy" – Kim Tae-yeon	Won
2012	5th Korea Drama Awards	Best New Actor	Jo Jung-suk	Nominated
2012	5th Korea Drama Awards	Best OST	"Missing You Like Crazy" – Kim Tae-yeon	Nominated
2012	14th Mnet Asian Music Awards	Best OST	"Missing You Like Crazy" – Kim Tae-yeon	Nominated
2012	1st K-Drama Star Awards	Top Excellence Award, Actress	Ha Ji-won	Nominated
2012	1st K-Drama Star Awards	Acting Award, Actress	Lee Yoon-ji	Nominated
2012	MBC Drama Awards	Top Excellence Award, Actor in a Miniseries	Lee Seung-gi	Nominated
2012	MBC Drama Awards	Top Excellence Award, Actress in a Miniseries	Ha Ji-won	Nominated
2012	MBC Drama Awards	Excellence Award, Actor in a Miniseries	Yoon Je-moon	Nominated
2012	MBC Drama Awards	Excellence Award, Actress in a Miniseries	Lee Yoon-ji	Won
2012	MBC Drama Awards	Best New Actor	Jo Jung-suk	Nominated
2012	MBC Drama Awards	Best Couple Award	Lee Seung-gi and Ha Ji-won	Nominated
2012	MBC Drama Awards	Best Couple Award	Jo Jung-suk and Lee Yoon-ji	Nominated
2013	49th Baeksang Arts Awards	Best New Actor (TV)	Jo Jung-suk	Nominated

== International broadcast ==
- Malaysia - 8TV, TV9 - June 20, 2015
- Thailand - Channel 7 - May 21, 2015
- Indonesia - RTV - April 23, 2016
