= Pilot (2024 film) =

2024 South Korean film by Kim Han-gyul

- Theatrical release poster
- Hangul: 파일럿
- Lit.: Pilot
- RR: Pailleot
- MR: P'aillŏt
- Directed by: Kim Han-gyul
- Screenplay by: Jo Yoo-jin
- Based on: Cockpit by Erik Ahrnbom
- Produced by: Kim Myung-jin; Kim Jae-joong
- Starring: Jo Jung-suk; Lee Ju-myoung; Han Sun-hwa; Shin Seung-ho
- Cinematography: Kim Sung-an
- Edited by: Nam Na-young
- Music by: Primary
- Production companies: Shotcake; Movie Rock
- Distributed by: Lotte Entertainment
- Release date: July 31, 2024
- Running time: 111 minutes
- Country: South Korea
- Language: Korean
- Box office: US$30.9 million

Pilot (Korean: 파일럿) is a 2024 South Korean comedy film directed by Kim Han-gyul and starring Jo Jung-suk, Lee Ju-myoung, Han Sun-hwa, and Shin Seung-ho. The film follows a star pilot, Han Jung-woo, who suddenly becomes unemployed and succeeds in getting re-employed after a drastic transformation. It was released theatrically on July 31, 2024.

Pilot is a remake of the 2012 Swedish film Cockpit.

== Plot ==
Han Jung-woo, a star pilot with top-notch flying skills and hot popularity that even led to his appearances on famous television shows, suffers a drastic fall from grace due to a momentary mistake. Blacklisted and unable to secure employment with any airline, he faces severe adversity. In a desperate bid for survival, Han Jung-woo adopts a new identity as his younger sister and manages to find re-employment. However, his newfound stability is soon threatened by unforeseen challenges.

== Cast ==
- Jo Jung-suk as Han Jung-woo, a star pilot who suddenly becomes unemployed after being fired from his dream job
- Lee Ju-myoung as Yoon Seul-gi, a cool and confident pilot who becomes close to Jung-woo
- Han Sun-hwa as Han Jung-mi, Jung-woo's younger sister and beauty YouTuber who does ASMR
- Shin Seung-ho as Seo Hyun-seok, Jung-woo's junior at work
- Kim Ji-hyun as Jung-woo's wife, who demands a divorce due to indifference
- Oh Min-ae as Kim An-ja, Jung-woo and Jung-mi's mother
- Seo Jae-hee as Noh Moon-young, director of Han Air
- Yoo Jae-suk as himself, host of You Quiz on the Block
- Jo Se-ho as himself, host of You Quiz on the Block
- Moon Sang-hoon as a character who appears in a YouTube video that Jung-woo is watching
- Hyun Bong-sik as Noh Jeong-wook, Moon-young's younger brother
- Seo Hyun-chul as a fellow captain
- Lee Soo-mi as Chance Yeong-hee
- Kang Ha-neul as Kang Hee-yeol
- Lee Si-eon as Air force captain
- Lee Chan-won as himself

== Box office ==
As of August 3, 2024, Pilot has grossed $5.7 million with a running total of 896,607 tickets sold. It surpassed one million admissions on the fourth day of release, which is the shortest period of time among movies released in the summer.

== Accolades ==
Award ceremony	Year	Category	Nominee	Result	Ref.
Baeksang Arts Awards	2025	Best Actor – Film	Jo Jung-suk	Won	
Baeksang Arts Awards	2025	Best Supporting Actress – Film	Han Sun-hwa	Nominated	
Baeksang Arts Awards	2025	Best Technical Achievement – Film	Lee Seo-jin (Makeup)	Nominated	
Blue Dragon Film Awards	2024	Best Supporting Actress	Han Sun-hwa	Nominated	
Blue Dragon Film Awards	2024	Best New Actress	Lee Ju-myoung	Nominated	
Director's Cut Awards	2025	Best New Actress (Film)	Han Sun-hwa	Nominated	
Korea Culture and Entertainment Awards	2024	Excellence Award, Actress in a Film	Lee Ju-myoung	Won	
Seoul Global Movie Awards	2024	Best New Actress	Lee Ju-myoung	Won	
Women in Film Korea Festival	2024	Best New Actor	Lee Ju-myoung	Won	
