= My Daughter Is a Zombie (film) =

2025 film by Pil Gam-sung

- Theatrical release poster
- Hangul: 좀비딸
- RR: Jombittal
- MR: Chombittal
- Directed by: Pil Gam-sung
- Screenplay by: Pil Gam-sung; Kim Hyun
- Based on: My Daughter Is a Zombie by Yun-chang Lee
- Produced by: Kwon Mi-kyung
- Starring: Jo Jung-suk; Lee Jung-eun; Cho Yeo-jeong; Yoon Kyung-ho; Choi Yu-ri
- Cinematography: Kim Tae-soo
- Edited by: Nam Na-yeong
- Music by: Kim Tae-seong
- Production company: Studio N
- Distributed by: Next Entertainment World
- Release date: July 30, 2025
- Running time: 113 minutes
- Country: South Korea
- Language: Korean
- Budget: ₩11 billion
- Box office: US$37.9 million

My Daughter Is a Zombie (Korean: 좀비딸) is a 2025 South Korean zombie comedy film directed by Pil Gam-sung and starring Jo Jung-suk, Lee Jung-eun, Cho Yeo-jeong, Yoon Kyung-ho, and Choi Yu-ri. Film adaptation of manhwa of the same name by Yun-chang Lee, it depicts a father's struggle to protect his daughter, who has been infected with a zombie virus, as he seeks refuge in his mother's rural home.

The film was released theatrically on July 30, 2025 in South Korea. It grossed $37.9 million worldwide, becoming the highest-grossing South Korean film of 2025.

== Synopsis ==
Lee Jung-hwan, a single father and keeper at Seoul Zoo, spends his days bickering with his teenage daughter Soo-ah, who is passionate about dancing. On Soo-ah's fifteenth birthday, a zombie virus, called the GAR Virus, sweeps across the world. The Lees flee the city, but as they drive away, Jung-hwan discovers that Soo-ah was bitten while waiting for him to fetch the car. She transforms before they can reach a hospital, and when she attacks Jung-hwan, he manages to subdue her.

Jung-hwan takes Soo-ah to his resolute mother Bam-sun, who still lives at his childhood home, the seaside village of Eunbong-ri. He plans to bring Soo-ah to a local hospital, but after he witnesses a special unit of the army killing an infected boy, he changes his mind, intending to mercy-kill her himself. While Bam-sun argues with him, Soo-ah slips away and goes to an old boathouse, where she used to play when she was a child. When she starts reacting to other cherished stimuli, Jung-hwan and Bam-sun realize that parts of her memory must still be intact. When Jo Dong-bae, Jung-hwan's childhood friend, comes by for an impromptu visit and discovers Soon-ah's condition, Jung-hwan swears him to secrecy.

Upon hearing a scientific report confirming that the infected indeed retain their old memories and that the virus can be weakened if these are re-stimulated, Jung-hwan decides to use his years of experience in tiger taming to restore Soo-ah. He and Dong-bae begin training Soo-ah, who gradually becomes docile around them. While the government reports that the outbreak has run its course, a substantial bounty has been placed for any report on new infections. While shopping in town, Jung-hwan meets his old crush Shin Yeon-hwa, a local schoolteacher who hates zombies after her fiancé got infected during the outbreak and she was forced to kill him; she has thus become a local celebrity for reporting infected to the government. After Yeon-hwa invites herself to Bam-sun's house for dinner and she gets awkwardly fended off, she begins to suspect that Soo-ah is infected.

After the village is declared zombie-free, the locals throw a festival. Jung-hwan and Dong-bae take the disguised Soo-ah there as part of her treatment, but her condition is noticed and recorded on film, which is then posted on social media. Meanwhile, Yeon-hwa confronts Bam-sun, who confesses the truth and also states that Soo-ah is actually Jung-hwan's niece and he took her in after her mother Jung-hye was killed in a traffic accident and her actual father, who was living off Jung-hye's money, abandoned Soo-ah. When Jung-hwan, Soon-a and Dong-bae return and Yeon-hwa prepares to kill the girl, Jung-hwan manages to pacify Soo-ah, thereby winning Yeon-hwa over to his cause.

However, more complications ensue when the village council decides to enroll all resident children, including Soo-ah, at the local middle school to prevent its closure, resulting in several very close calls. Additionally, that evening Soo-ah's father, who has noticed the video post, kidnaps his daughter to turn her in for the bounty. Jung-hwan intercepts him but is beaten to the ground. Seeíng Jung-hwan attacked, Soo-ah breaks her docility and bites her father, infecting him and forcing Jung-hwan to kill him. Now that the secret is out, Jung-hwan decides to leave with Soo-ah, but an army unit looking for her arrives and corners them at the boathouse. When Jung-hwan refuses to step aside, he is shot, but as he lies bleeding out, Soo-ah reacts with sadness, stalling the soldiers with her emotional display.

After getting rushed to the hospital, it is revealed that while training Soo-ah, Jung-hwan, who has gone into a coma, had sustained several bites from her which he immediately desinfected, thereby developing an immunity to the GAR Virus. The resulting anti-bodies were used to restore Soo-ah to full humanity, and his story has become a worldwide sensation, fostering hope for a quickly available cure. While waiting for Jung-hwan to recover, Soo-ah successfully participates in a dancing contest. When Yeon-hwa visits Jung-hwan and replays a video recording of her performance, his finger begins twitching to the music.

== Cast ==
- Jo Jung-suk as Lee Jung-hwan
- Choi Yu-ri as Lee Soo-ah
- Lee Jung-eun as Kim Bam-sun
- Cho Yeo-jeong as Shin Yeon-hwa
- Yoon Kyung-ho as Jo Dong-bae

== Production ==
In April 2024, Studio N announced that it would adapt manhwa My Daughter Is a Zombie into a film. Pil Gam-seong was assigned the job of direction.

In June 2024, Lee Jung-eun and Jo Jung-suk were offered roles of mother and son. Choi Yu-ri was also considering the role of daughter of Jo Jung-suk in the film.

The film was announced in July 2024 after completing the cast. Filming began in August 2024. Choi Yu-ri, who portrayed the zombie daughter Soo-ah, for 300-day period wore special makeup spanning from pre-production through filming. Each session lasted two hours and was carefully structured into four progressive stages, reflecting the story and emotional changes of her character.

The film was made on a production budget of ₩11 billion having a break-even point of 2.2 million viewers.

=== Music ===
The song "No. 1" by BoA is a major theme in the film.

== Release ==
My Daughter Is a Zombie was released in South Korean theaters on July 30, 2025 by Next Entertainment World. The production report was presented on June 30, 2025 at CGV Yongsan I-Park Mall in Yongsan-gu, Seoul.

On 12 October 2025, it was showcased at the 58th Sitges Film Festival in the 'Panorama' section.

The film is scheduled for a staggered release across 22 countries in Asia and Oceania. It will premiere in Taiwan on August 1, followed by releases in Indonesia and Vietnam on August 8, and the Philippines on August 13. Subsequent releases are planned for Singapore, Malaysia, and Brunei on August 14; Australia, New Zealand, and 12 other Oceanian countries thereafter; and Hong Kong and Macau on August 21.

=== Home media ===
The film was made available for streaming on IPTV (KT Genie TV, SK B TV, LG Uplus TV), Home Choice, Coupang Play, Google Play, KT SkyLife, Webhard, and Cinefox, from September 25, 2025.

== Reception ==
=== Box office ===
The film topped overall advance ticket sales and recorded the highest single-day pre-release ticket sales of the year on the day prior to its theatrical debut. With a total of 363,749 advance tickets sold, it set a new record for the highest pre-release sales for any film released in 2025 so far. The film was released on July 30, 2025 on 1557 screens. It opened at the top recording 430,091 viewers on its opening day at the Korean box office. The film achieved the highest opening score of the year for the films released till date and set a new record for the highest opening for a Korean comedy film to date. On August 2, it surpassed 1 million cumulative viewers in four days of its release by registering 1,146,221 cumulative audience, and by August 4, it surpassed 2 million cumulative viewers in six days of its release. As of August 9, the film surpassed 3 million cumulative viewers in 11 days since its release. On August 15, it recorded 4,004,640 cumulative viewers and became the first and fastest film to surpass 4 million viewers among films released in South Korea in 2025. On August 24, the film surpassed 5 million cumulative viewers, recording a total of 5,016,800 admissions within 26 days of its release.

As of September 24, 2025, the film has grossed US$37,845,399 from 5,620,837 admissions. It recovered its production cost within 8 days of release, becoming a commercial success.

=== Critical response ===
Woo Jae-yeon writing the review of the film in Yonhap News, wrote that the film has received attention for its strong performances, with particular praise directed at the central father-daughter dynamic, which serves as the emotional anchor of the narrative. Choi's portrayal of a character situated between human and zombie identities was highlighted for its nuance and depth, writing "Choi's nuanced portrayal of a half-human, half-zombie is a standout." Woo noted the film’s deliberate use of retro stylistic choices, which set it apart from the contemporary trend of sleek, genre-driven Korean cinema. Concluding his review Woo opinioned, "the film is a perfect escape for the scorching summer season," for the viewers seeking a surprising blend of sentiment and escapism.

=== Accolades ===
| Award ceremony | Year | Category | Recipient(s) | Result | Ref. |
|---|---|---|---|---|---|
| Baeksang Arts Awards | 2026 | Best New Actress | Choi Yu-ri | Nominated | |
| Blue Dragon Film Awards | 2025 | Best Film | My Daughter Is a Zombie | Nominated | |
| Blue Dragon Film Awards | 2025 | Best Director | Pil Gam-sung | Nominated | |
| Blue Dragon Film Awards | 2025 | Best Actor | Jo Jung-suk | Nominated | |
| Blue Dragon Film Awards | 2025 | Best Supporting Actor | Yoon Kyung-ho | Nominated | |
| Blue Dragon Film Awards | 2025 | Best Supporting Actress | Lee Jung-eun | Nominated | |
| Blue Dragon Film Awards | 2025 | Best Music | Kim Tae-seong | Nominated | |
| Blue Dragon Film Awards | 2025 | Audience Choice Award for Most Popular Film | My Daughter Is a Zombie | Won | |
| Chunsa Film Art Awards | 2025 | Best Supporting Actress | Lee Jung-eun | Won | |
| Golden Cinematography Awards | 2025 | Best Actor | Jo Jung-suk | Won | |
| Buil Film Awards | 2026 | Best Supporting Actor | Yoon Kyung-ho | Pending | |
| Buil Film Awards | 2026 | Best Supporting Actress | Lee Jung-eun | Pending | |
