= Two Cops (TV series) =

South Korean television series

- Promotional poster
- Hangul: 투깝스
- RR: Tukkapseu
- MR: T'ukkapsŭ
- Genre: Romantic comedy; Fantasy; Mystery; Action
- Written by: Byun Sang-soon
- Directed by: Oh Hyun-jong
- Starring: Jo Jung-suk; Lee Hye-ri; Kim Seon-ho
- Country of origin: South Korean
- Original language: Korean
- No. of episodes: 32

Production
- Executive producer: Jung Chan-hee
- Camera setup: Single camera
- Running time: 35 min
- Production company: People Story Company

Original release
- Network: MBC
- Release: November 27, 2017 – January 16, 2018

Two Cops (Korean: 투깝스) is a South Korean television series starring Jo Jung-suk, Lee Hye-ri, and Kim Seon-ho. The series aired on Mondays and Tuesdays at 22:00 (KST), from November 27, 2017, to January 16, 2018.

== Synopsis ==
A single-minded, dedicated violent crimes detective who finds himself cohabiting his own body with the soul of a sleazy con artist; and falls in love with a feisty rookie reporter.

== Cast ==
=== Main ===
- Jo Jung-suk as Cha Dong-tak / Gong Su-chang

Cha Dong-tak: A dedicated and fierce detective in the violent crimes unit, who is serious and inflexible in life; but possesses an awkward and endearing charm.
Gong Su-chang: A skilled con man who tricks people with his sly techniques.

- Lee Hye-ri as Song Ji-an

A determined and feisty rookie reporter trying to clear her late father's name.

- Kim Seon-ho as Gong Su-chang

A con-artist whose soul inhabits Cha Dong-tak's body.

=== Supporting ===
- Lee Ho-won as Dokgo Sung-hyeok

A fellow detective who trusts Cha Dong-tak with all his heart. He is from a rich family and likes to brag about it, but he's also smart and a positive thinker.

- Lee Si-eon as Yong-pal

A bar owner who is known for his knife skills and loyalty.

- Moon Ji-in as Gil Da-jung
- Kim Young-woong as Park Dong-gi

A detective who is a troublemaker and mood maker. He is loyal and constantly seeks justice.

- Kim Seo-kyung

Song Ji-an's friend.

- Park Hoon as Tak Jae-hee
  - Choi Min-young as young Jae-hee

A prosecutor who is Ji-an's friend

- Oh Eui-shik as Lee Ho-tae
- Jung Hae-kyun as Senior Superintendent Ma Jin-kook
- Ryu Tae-ho as Noh Young-man
- Choi Il-hwa as Tak Jung-hwan
- Lee Dae-yeon as Captain Yoo Jung-man
- Lee Jae-won as Lee Doo-sik
- Im Se-mi as Ko Bong-sook
- Ryu Hye-rin as Miss Bong
- Lee Jin-hee as Woo Hye-in the widow of detective Cho Hang-joon, former partner of Cha Dong-tak.
- Kim Myung-seon as nurse
- Yoon Bong-kil as Dokki, Yong-pal's minion

=== Special appearance ===
- Kim Min-jong as Jo Hang-jun (ep 1–2)
- Park Jin-joo as nurse Song Gyung-mi(ep 3)
- Choi Won-hong (ep 7–9)
- Min Sung-wook as Manager Park(ep 8–12)
- Ji Il-joo as Kyung-chul (ep 14–16)
- Jo Woo-ri as Min-ah (ep 13–16)
- Jang In-sub as Jo Min-suk (ep 22-)

== Production ==
- Han Ji-min was offered the leading role but she declined.
- Two Cops serves as the second production of People Story Company (the company behind The Emperor: Owner of the Mask).
- The series is based on a script by Byun Sang-soon which was one of the winners of the 2016 KBS TV Drama Miniseries Competition. The series was planned for broadcast on KBS 2TV (under the production of People Story Company) as a prize for winning the competition, but due to "irreconcilable differences" between KBS, People Story Company and writer Byun, it was shelved before MBC decided to pick the series up for broadcast. Instead, KBS 2TV aired Don't Trust Her (later re-titled as Witch at Court).

== Original soundtrack ==
Two Cops OST

Soundtrack album by Various Artists
- Genres: Soundtrack; ballad
- Labels: SyncPop; VLENDING

=== Part 1 ===
Released on December 4, 2017
No.	Title	Lyrics	Music	Artist	Length
1.	"Don't Ask" (묻지 말기로 해)	Seo Dong-sung	Park Sung-il	Voisper	03:53
2.	"Don't Ask" (Inst.)		Park Sung-il		03:53
Total length:					07:46

=== Part 2 ===
Released on December 11, 2017
No.	Title	Lyrics	Music	Artist	Length
1.	"Fall In Love"	Lohi	Lohi	U Sung-eun	04:21
2.	"Fall In Love" (Inst.)		Lohi		04:21
Total length:					08:42

=== Part 3 ===
Released on December 18, 2017
No.	Title	Lyrics	Music	Artist	Length
1.	"Dreamer"	TAIBIAN	Kim Chang-rak, Han Kyung-soo, Choi Han-sol	The Vane	03:36
2.	"Dreamer" (Inst.)		Kim Chang-rak, Han Kyung-soo, Choi Han-sol		03:36
Total length:					07:12

=== Part 4 ===
Released on December 26, 2017
No.	Title	Lyrics	Music	Artist	Length
1.	"You Make Me"	Lee Chi-hoon	Choi Jae-man	SALTNPAPER	04:23
2.	"You Make Me" (Inst.)		Choi Jae-man		04:23
Total length:					08:46

=== Part 5 ===
Released on January 2, 2018
No.	Title	Lyrics	Music	Artist	Length
1.	"By The Way" (그런데 말야)	Seo Dong-sung	Shin Hyung, Kim Jin-hoon	Gu Yoon-hoe	04:28
2.	"By The Way" (Inst.)		Shin Hyung, Kim Jin-hoon		04:28
Total length:					08:56

=== Part 6 ===
Released on January 8, 2018
No.	Title	Lyrics	Music	Artist	Length
1.	"Coat" (외투)	Park Sung-il, Lee Chi-hoon	Park Sung-il	Lim Jeong-hee	03:26
2.	"Coat" (Inst.)		Park Sung-il		03:26
Total length:					06:52

=== Part 7 ===
Released on January 15, 2018
No.	Title	Lyrics	Music	Artist	Length
1.	"Lie"	Seo Dong-sung	Park Sung-il, Uncle Sam	Car, the garden	03:10
2.	"Lie" (Inst.)		Park Sung-il, Uncle Sam		03:10
Total length:					06:20

== Ratings ==
- In the table below, the blue numbers represent the lowest ratings and the red numbers represent the highest ratings.
- NR denotes that the series did not rank in the top 20 daily programs on that date.

Episode #	Original broadcast date	Average audience share			
Episode #	Original broadcast date	TNmS Ratings		AGB Nielsen	
Episode #	Original broadcast date	Nationwide	Seoul	Nationwide	Seoul
1	November 27, 2017	5.5% (NR)	6.1% (NR)	4.6% (NR)	5.2% (NR)
2	November 27, 2017	6.0% (NR)	6.2% (20th)	5.1% (NR)	5.4% (NR)
3	November 28, 2017	5.5% (NR)	5.5% (20th)	3.3% (NR)	3.6% (NR)
4	November 28, 2017	6.4% (17th)	6.8% (14th)	3.6% (NR)	3.7% (NR)
5	December 4, 2017	8.0% (16th)	7.6% (14th)	7.1% (20th)	7.8% (17th)
6	December 4, 2017	8.6% (13th)	8.5% (7th)	8.2%(15th)	8.9%(11th)
7	December 5, 2017	6.7% (16th)	6.5% (16th)	6.3% (NR)	6.9% (17th)
8	December 5, 2017	7.7% (12th)	7.6% (10th)	7.3% (14th)	8.0% (11th)
9	December 11, 2017	7.3% (20th)	7.8% (14th)	7.1% (NR)	7.9% (18th)
10	December 11, 2017	8.1% (15th)	8.6% (10th)	8.1% (15th)	8.8% (12th)
11	December 12, 2017	6.2% (19th)	6.0% (20th)	6.0% (NR)	6.9% (NR)
12	December 12, 2017	7.6% (14th)	7.7% (11th)	7.0% (16th)	7.2% (17th)
13	December 18, 2017	7.5% (18th)	7.8% (16th)	6.3% (NR)	7.2% (NR)
14	December 18, 2017	8.7% (15th)	9.2% (10th)	7.4% (18th)	7.7% (17th)
15	December 19, 2017	5.6% (NR)	5.6% (20th)	5.1% (NR)	5.3% (NR)
16	December 19, 2017	6.3% (18th)	6.1% (16th)	6.1% (NR)	6.4% (NR)
17	December 25, 2017	6.7% (NR)	7.0% (13th)	6.8% (NR)	7.0% (18th)
18	December 25, 2017	8.2% (13th)	8.4% (8th)	7.7% (17th)	8.0% (11th)
19	December 26, 2017	6.0% (NR)	6.8% (NR)	5.3% (NR)	6.1% (NR)
20	December 26, 2017	6.9% (NR)	7.3% (NR)	6.2% (18th)	6.6% (17th)
21	January 1, 2018	7.5% (20th)	7.6%	6.7% (NR)	6.8% (NR)
22	January 1, 2018	8.1% (17th)	8.5%	7.9% (19th)	8.3% (16th)
23	January 2, 2018	8.5% (14th)	8.6%	6.3% (19th)	6.4% (20th)
24	January 2, 2018	9.5% (11th)	10.0%	7.7% (15th)	8.2% (10th)
25	January 8, 2018	7.6% (18th)	7.8%	6.6% (NR)	6.7% (18th)
26	January 8, 2018	9.0% (11th)	9.1%	7.6% (16th)	7.5% (12th)
27	January 9, 2018	6.9% (17th)	7.1%	6.5% (NR)	6.7% (15th)
28	January 9, 2018	8.5% (10th)	9.3%	8.2% (12th)	8.8% (9th)
29	January 15, 2018	8.0% (15th)	8.2%	7.5% (17th)	7.7% (15th)
30	January 15, 2018	9.5% (9th)	9.6%	9.3% (10th)	9.3% (8th)
31	January 16, 2018	8.5% (12th)	9.3%	7.7% (14th)	8.5% (9th)
32	January 16, 2018	10.1% (8th)	10.3%	9.7% (7th)	9.9% (5th)
Average		7.5%	7.7%	6.7%	7.1%

== Awards and nominations ==
Year	Award	Category	Nominated	Result	Ref.
2017	MBC Drama Awards	Grand Prize (Daesang)	Jo Jung-suk	Nominated	
2017	MBC Drama Awards	Drama of the Year	Two Cops	Nominated	
2017	MBC Drama Awards	Top Excellence Award, Actor in a Monday-Tuesday Drama	Jo Jung-suk	Won	
2017	MBC Drama Awards	Top Excellence Award, Actress in a Monday-Tuesday Drama	Lee Hye-ri	Nominated	
2017	MBC Drama Awards	Excellence Award, Actor in a Monday-Tuesday Drama	Kim Seon-ho	Won	
2017	MBC Drama Awards	Excellence Award, Actress in a Monday-Tuesday Drama	Im Se-mi	Nominated	
2017	MBC Drama Awards	Golden Acting Award, Actor in a Monday-Tuesday Drama	Lee Si-eon	Nominated	
2017	MBC Drama Awards	Golden Acting Award, Actress in a Monday-Tuesday Drama	Moon Ji-in	Nominated	
2017	MBC Drama Awards	Popularity Award, Actor	Jo Jung-suk	Nominated	
2017	MBC Drama Awards	Popularity Award, Actress	Lee Hye-ri	Nominated	
2017	MBC Drama Awards	Best New Actor	Kim Seon-ho	Won	
2017	MBC Drama Awards	Best Character Award, Comic Character	Kim Seon-ho	Nominated	
2018	6th APAN Star Awards	Top Excellence Award, Actor in a Miniseries	Jo Jung-suk	Nominated	
2018	215th PD of the Month Award	Best Drama	Two Cops	Won	
