= My Love, My Bride (2014 film) =

2014 South Korean film

- Theatrical poster
- Directed by: Im Chan-sang
- Written by: Kim Ji-hye
- Based on: My Love, My Bride by Lee Myung-se
- Produced by: Byun Bong-hyun
- Starring: Jo Jung-suk; Shin Min-ah
- Cinematography: Choi Ju-young
- Edited by: Kim Hyeong-ju
- Music by: Kim Jun-seong
- Production company: Film Momentum
- Distributed by: CineGuru
- Release date: October 8, 2014
- Running time: 111 minutes
- Country: South Korea
- Language: Korean
- Box office: US$14.7 million

My Love, My Bride (Korean: 나의 사랑 나의 신부; RR: Naui sarang naui sinbu) is a 2014 South Korean romantic comedy film starring Jo Jung-suk and Shin Min-ah.

It is a remake of the hit 1990 film of the same title starring Park Joong-hoon and Choi Jin-sil.

== Plot ==
The film revolves around the real life circumstances of every newlywed sweethearts. Young-min and Mi-young are a young couple who get married after graduating from college. Following the honeymoon period, they begin to bicker with each other. As they struggle to make their marriage work, Young-min and Mi-young gradually understand what love really is.

== Cast ==
- Jo Jung-suk as Young-min
- Shin Min-ah as Mi-young
- Yoon Jung-hee as Seung-hee
- Bae Seong-woo as Dal-soo
- Ra Mi-ran as Madam
- Jeon Moo-song as Pan Hae-il
- Lee Si-eon as Ki-tae
- Ko Kyu-pil as Jeong-jin
- Seo Kang-joon as Joon-soo
- Hwang Jeong-min
- Seo Shin-ae as Jae-kyung
- Yoo Ha-joon as Choi Seong-woo
- Kwon Hyuk-soo as pork restaurant deliver guy

== Box office ==
My Love, My Bride was released on October 8, 2014. It drew 787,535 admissions after five days in theaters, making it the first romantic comedy to rank number one at the South Korean box office for 2014. The film topped the box office for two consecutive weeks, earning ₩11.3 billion (US$10.6 million) from 1.44 million admissions. It reached 2 million admissions on its fourth week.

== Awards and nominations ==
| Year | Award | Category | Recipient | Result |
|---|---|---|---|---|
| 2014 | 35th Blue Dragon Film Awards | Best Supporting Actress | Ra Mi-ran | Nominated |
