= Land of Happiness =

2024 South Korean film by Choo Chang-min

- Theatrical release poster
- Hangul: 행복의 나라
- Lit.: Land of Happiness
- RR: Haengbogui nara
- MR: Haengbogŭi nara
- Directed by: Choo Chang-min
- Written by: Heo Jun-seok
- Produced by: Lee Jun-taek; Jang Jin-seung
- Starring: Jo Jung-suk; Lee Sun-kyun; Yoo Jae-myung
- Cinematography: Hong Jae-sik
- Edited by: Heo Seon-mi
- Music by: Kim Tae-seong
- Production companies: Papas Films; Oscar 10 Studio
- Distributed by: Next Entertainment World
- Release date: August 14, 2024
- Running time: 124 minutes
- Country: South Korea
- Language: Korean
- Box office: US$4.8 million

Land of Happiness (Korean: 행복의 나라) is a 2024 South Korean legal drama film directed by Choo Chang-min, starring Jo Jung-suk, Lee Sun-kyun (in his final film role), and Yoo Jae-myung. The film is inspired by the real-life figure Tae Yoon-ki, who served as the defense attorney for Army colonel Park Heung-ju in the aftermath of the assassination of Park Chung Hee. It was released theatrically on August 14, 2024.

== Plot ==
Jung In-hoo, a master of legal battles, takes on one of the most challenging political trials in South Korean history by defending Park Tae-ju, the chief secretary of the intelligence agency implicated in the assassination of the president. Despite the overwhelming odds, with Tae-ju's sentence seemingly predetermined due to his military status, In-hoo fights relentlessly to ensure a fair trial. However, his frustration boils over as he faces an increasingly unjust legal process.

Thirty minutes before the assassination, Tae-ju receives an order from the chief of the intelligence agency to subdue the bodyguards if necessary. The central issue in court becomes whether his actions were a "premeditated act of rebellion" or "obedience to orders under duress". Although In-hoo advises Tae-ju to testify in a way that could save him, Tae-ju remains steadfast, refusing to betray the trust placed in him.

Meanwhile, Jeon Sang-doo, the ambitious leader of the joint investigation team, harbors dangerous ambitions following the events of October 26. He manipulates the trial from the shadows, eavesdropping on proceedings and subtly steering the outcome by sending real-time notes to the court, all while mocking the determined In-hoo.

== Cast ==
- Jo Jung-suk as Jung In-hoo, Tae-ju's lawyer
- Lee Sun-kyun as Park Tae-ju, a director's secretary of the KCIA
- Yoo Jae-myung as Jeon Sang-doo, joint investigation team leader
- Woo Hyun as Lee Man-sik, a representative of the defense team
- Lee Won-jong as Jeong Jin-hoo, Army Chief of Staff
- Jeon Bae-soo as Bu Han-myeong, a trial defense attorney
- Song Young Kyu as Choi Yong-nam, a trial defense attorney
- Choi Won-young as Baek Seung-gi, a prosecutor
- Kang Mal-geum as Ok Jeong-ae, Tae-ju's wife
- Park Hoon as Kim Oh-ryong, Deputy Chief of Staff
- Lee Hyun-kyun as Jo Sang-cheol, a trial defense attorney
- Jin Ki-joo as Jo Soon-jung, In-hoo's girlfriend
- Yoo Seong-ju as Kim Young-il, KCIA director
- Kim Pub-lae as Kim Young-hyun, a military judge
- Kim Jae-chul as Jin Tae-gon, Sang-doo's subordinate
- Lim Ki-hong as Lee Tae-moo, a driver
- Park No-sik as a KCIA official

== Production ==
Principal photography began in October 2021 and ended in January 2022.

== Release ==
The film was screened as one of the films in the Special program in focus 'In Memory of Lee Sun-kyun' at the 29th Busan International Film Festival to be held from October 2 to 11, 2024.

== Reception ==
=== Box office ===
As of August 30, 2024, Land of Happiness has grossed $4.6 million with a running total of 670,487 tickets sold.

=== Accolades ===
Award ceremony	Year	Category	Nominee / Work	Result	Ref.
Baeksang Arts Awards	2025	Best Supporting Actor	Yoo Jae-myung	Won	
Buil Film Awards	2025	Best Actor	Jo Jung-suk	Nominated	
Buil Film Awards	2025	Best Supporting Actor	Yoo Jae-myung	Nominated	
Buil Film Awards	2025	Best Screenplay	Heo Jun-seok	Nominated	
