= Don't Dare to Dream =

2016 South Korean television series

- Promotional poster
- Hangul: 질투의 화신
- Hanja: 嫉妒의 化身
- Lit.: Jealousy Incarnate
- RR: Jiltuui hwasin
- MR: Chilt'uŭi hwasin
- Genre: Workplace; Romantic comedy
- Written by: Seo Sook-hyang
- Directed by: Park Shin-woo(Ep. 1–24); Lee Jung-heum (Ep. 5–24)
- Starring: Gong Hyo-jin; Jo Jung-suk; Go Kyung-pyo; Lee Mi-sook; Park Ji-young; Lee Sung-jae; Seo Ji-hye
- Music by: Nam Hye-seung
- Opening theme: "Did You Ride UFO?" by Heize & Go Young-bae
- Country of origin: South Korea
- Original language: Korean
- No. of episodes: 24

Production
- Executive producer: Park Young-soo
- Producers: Jung Chang-hwan; Han Se-min
- News editors: Kim In-yeong; Park Sung-hee
- Production locations: Seoul; Bangkok, Thailand
- Cinematography: Kang Seung-gi; Hong Seung-hyuk; Jung Jong-bum; Jang Duk-hwan
- Running time: 60 minutes
- Production companies: SM C&C

Original release
- Network: SBS TV
- Release: August 24 – November 10, 2016

Don't Dare to Dream (Korean: 질투의 화신), also known by its literal title Jealousy Incarnate, is a 2016 South Korean television series starring Gong Hyo-jin, Jo Jung-suk, Go Kyung-pyo, Lee Mi-sook, Park Ji-young, Lee Sung-jae, and Seo Ji-hye. It aired on SBS every Wednesday and Thursday at 22:00 (KST) from August 24 to November 10, 2016, for a total of 24 episodes.

== Synopsis ==
Weather caster Pyo Na-ri (Gong Hyo-jin) and news anchor Lee Hwa-shin (Jo Jung-suk) work at the same broadcasting station, with a complicated history between them. Na-ri once harbored feelings for Hwa-shin, but when she crosses paths with the wealthy and well-mannered Go Jung-won (Go Kyung-pyo) — a close friend of Hwa-shin — tensions and romantic dilemmas emerge. Meanwhile, rivalries in both love and career between other characters (e.g., Lee Mi-sook, Park Ji-young, Lee Sung-jae) further complicate relationships.

== Cast ==
=== Main ===
- Gong Hyo-jin as Pyo Na-ri

Na-ri is a weather broadcaster with an optimistic personality. Graduating from a third-rate college and having no money or connections, Na-ri is full of insecurities, but continues to persevere and work hard to keep her place at the station. She used to have a crush on Hwa-shin for 3 years.

- Jo Jung-suk as Lee Hwa-shin

Hwa-shin is a star reporter and news anchor with a great education and family background. He has a proud, competitive and macho personality; and gets jealous when Na-ri is with Jung-won as he starts developing feelings for her.

- Go Kyung-pyo as Go Jung-won

A polite, friendly man who is serious when it comes to love. Jung-won is the boss of a publishing company, and a chaebol heir of a large corporation that manages several luxury clothing brands. He falls for Na-ri at first sight.

- Lee Mi-sook as Kye Sung-sook

A reporter-turned-anchorwoman. Jong-shin's first wife and Ppal-gang's mother.

- Park Ji-young as Bang Ja-young

Department head of SBC station and announcer. Jong-shin's second wife.

- Lee Sung-jae as Kim Rak

Chef and owner of a restaurant, and landlord to Nari and her family. A kind and caring man who cares for his tenants like family. Jung-won's uncle.

- Seo Ji-hye as Hong Hye-won

The daughter of the Senior Secretary to the President for Public Affairs and a news anchor for the 7PM news. She's intelligent and capable in her career. However, in her 29 years of life, she hasn't had one ordeal to deal with and she doesn't believe people are equal, making her conceited.

=== Supporting ===
==== Crazy 18 ====
- Moon Ga-young as Lee Ppal-gang, Hwa-shin's niece
- Kim Jung-hyun as Pyo Chi-yeol, Na-ri's brother
- Ahn Woo-yeon as Oh Dae-goo

==== People around Hwa Shin ====
- Park Jung-soo as Hwa-shin's mother
- Yoon Da-hoon as Lee Jong-shin, Hwa-shin's brother and Ppal-gang's father

==== People around Jung Won ====
- Choi Hwa-jung as Kim Tae-ra, Jung-won's mother and Kim Rak's sister
- Park Sung-hoon as Secretary Cha

==== People at SBC broadcasting company ====
- Kwon Hae-hyo as Oh Jong-hwan
- Jung Sang-hoon as Choi Dong-ki
- Yoo Jae-myung as Uhm Ki-dae
- Park Hwan-hee as Keum Soo-jung
- Park Eun-ji as Park Jin
- Seo Yu-ri as Hong Ji-min
- Kim Ye-won as Na Joo-hee
- Jun Ji-an as Im Soo-mi
- Yoo Jung-rae as Kan Mi-young
- Lee Chae-won as Yang Sung-sook
- Park Seo-young as Jang Hee-soo
- Sung Chang-hoon as New agency staff
- Lee Myung-haeng as 7 o'clock news anchor

==== People at Rak Villa ====
- Seo Eun-soo as Lee Hong Dan, Na-ri and Chi-yeol's step mother
- Sul Woo-hyung as Pyo Bum, Na-ri's step brother
- Suh Hyun-suk as Lee Seung-han

==== People at Sun Hospital ====
- Bae Hae-sun as Keum Suk-ho, Oncologist
- Park Jin-joo as Nurse Oh Jin-joo

=== Extended ===
- Min Jung-sub
- Song Ha-rim as School office clerk who attended the festival
- Yeo Un-bok as surgeon
- Choi Kyu-sik as Taxi driver
- Lee Do-yeop
- Jang Hae-min
- Lee Yoon-sang as Executive Officer of Yonee Group's hotel
- Kwan Eun-soo

=== Special appearances ===
- BamBam as Guy in Thailand nightclub (Ep. 1)
- Vivian Cha as Guy's girlfriend (Ep. 1)
- Yoo Jae-myung as news anchor
- Lee Jung-eun as Orthopaedist
- Oh Se-deuk as Chinese restaurant chef
- Jung Kyung-sun as Pyo Na-ri's mother
- Han Ji-min as Han Ji-min, Hwa-shin's blind date (Ep. 11)
- Kim Kyung-ran as announcer open recruitment judge (Ep. 14)
- Ahn Hye-kyung as announcer applicant (Ep. 14)
- Jun Hyun-moo as announcer applicant (SBS announcer) (Ep. 14)
- Oh Jung-yeon as announcer applicant (Ep. 14)
- Kim Yoon-sang as announcer applicant (SBS announcer) (Ep. 14)
- Lee Sun-kyun Na-ri's blind date (Voice) (Ep. 15)
- Ko Sung-hee as Hong Soo-young, Hwa-shin and Jung-won's first love (Ep. 17)

== Broadcast rights bidding ==
KBS 2TV and SBS both expressed interest in broadcast rights for Don't Dare to Dream. When the casting was first announced in February 2016, the drama was then in talks to air on KBS 2TV, but SBS decided to join the bidding war. In April 2016, it was announced that SBS won the drama's broadcast rights.

== Original soundtrack ==
Don't Dare to Dream OST

Soundtrack album by Various Artists
- Released: November 10, 2016
- Genre: Soundtrack
- Languages: Korean, English
- Labels: EL Music Studio; Universal Music

No.	Title	Artist(s)	Length
1.	"Did You Ride UFO? (UFO 타고 왔니 ?)"	Heize, Go Young-bae	3:47
2.	"Lovesome"	Ra.D	3:52
3.	"Step Step"	Suran	4:13
4.	"Would You Come to Me (내게 올래요)"	Brother Su	3:41
5.	"Bye, Autumn"	SALTNPAPER	4:00
6.	"Melting"	April 2nd	3:32
7.	"Yes! Love"	Kim Hyun-ah (Lalasweet)	3:24
8.	"Because Of You (너 때문에)"	Kim Tae-woo (G.O.D)	4:11
9.	"Mon Tue Wed Thu Fri Sat Sun (월화수목금토일)"	J Rabbit	3:20
10.	"Only Going Far Away"	Unknown dress	4:20
11.	"With You (연애 좀 할까)"	Kwon Jin-ah	3:31
12.	"Don't Explain"	My-Q	3:45
13.	"Jealousy Incarnate (질투의 화신)"	April 2nd	3:33
14.	"Did You Ride UFO? (UFO 타고 왔니?)" (Acoustic Ver.)	Heize	3:34
15.	"I See You"	Peanuts Butter	3:34
16.	"Melted (녹아내린다)"	April 2nd	2:30
17.	"No! No! No!"	Various Artists	1:25
18.	"Pit a Pat (두근 두근)"	Various Artists	2:01
19.	"Between Friendship and Love (우정과 사랑 사이)"	Various Artists	3:03
20.	"Rock Villa Girls (락빌라 그녀들)"	Various Artists	1:37
21.	"Coward and Miserable (찌질하고 처량한)"	Various Artists	1:31
22.	"Their Love Law (그들만의 사랑법)"	Various Artists	2:05
23.	"Jealous (질투)"	Various Artists	3:07
24.	"With Dad With Me (아빠하고 나하고)"	Various Artists	1:17

=== Charted songs ===
Chart Performance

Title	Year	Peak chart positions	Sales	Remarks
Title	Year	KOR Gaon	Sales	Remarks
"Lovesome" (Ra.D)	2016	95	KOR: 21,269+	Part 2
"Step Step" (Suran)	2016	90	KOR: 90,593+	Part 3
"Would You Come to Me" (Brother Su)	2016	87	KOR: 42,407+	Part 4

== Ratings ==
Ep.	Broadcast date	Average audience share			
Ep.	Broadcast date	TNmS		AGB Nielsen	
Ep.	Broadcast date	Nationwide	Seoul	Nationwide	Seoul
1	August 24, 2016	6.9% (NR)	8.8% (12th)	7.3% (19th)	8.1% (17th)
2	August 25, 2016	7.9% (18th)	9.1% (12th)	8.3% (15th)	9.2% (13th)
3	August 31, 2016	8.0% (20th)	10.3% (11th)	8.7% (13th)	10.1% (9th)
4	September 1, 2016	8.6% (14th)	10.0% (7th)	9.1% (10th)	9.9% (8th)
5	September 7, 2016	8.2% (18th)	10.0% (11th)	9.9% (7th)	11.2% (5th)
6	September 8, 2016	8.2% (17th)	10.0% (11th)	9.2% (11th)	10.7% (6th)
7	September 14, 2016	7.6% (NR)	9.1% (8th)	8.1% (11th)	9.1% (9th)
8	September 15, 2016	10.3% (7th)	11.5% (4th)	10.1% (4th)	11.9% (4th)
9	September 21, 2016	10.1% (10th)	13.1% (4th)	12.3% (4th)	13.5% (4th)
10	September 22, 2016	10.2% (8th)	12.9% (4th)	13.2% (4th)	14.8% (4th)
11	September 28, 2016	10.2% (12th)	11.9% (5th)	12.1% (4th)	13.5% (4th)
12	September 29, 2016	11.4% (6th)	13.6% (4th)	12.3% (4th)	13.5% (4th)
13	October 5, 2016	9.5% (13th)	11.6% (5th)	11.9% (5th)	13.2% (4th)
14	October 6, 2016	11.8% (7th)	14.1% (4th)	12.6% (4th)	13.9% (4th)
15	October 12, 2016	10.2% (11th)	12.8% (4th)	11.2% (6th)	11.8% (5th)
16	October 13, 2016	11.2% (8th)	13.1% (2nd)	11.7% (6th)	12.9% (3rd)
17	October 19, 2016	9.8% (13th)	12.7% (4th)	11.3% (6th)	12.9% (4th)
18	October 20, 2016	10.4% (11th)	12.6% (5th)	11.8% (6th)	13.1% (4th)
19	October 26, 2016	8.8% (15th)	11.7% (5th)	10.2% (6th)	11.5% (5th)
20	October 27, 2016	10.0% (11th)	12.1% (5th)	10.2% (7th)	11.4% (5th)
21	November 2, 2016	9.1% (15th)	11.3% (5th)	9.7% (7th)	10.7% (5th)
22	November 3, 2016	10.0% (14th)	12.1% (8th)	10.6% (7th)	11.6% (4th)
23	November 9, 2016	8.0% (16th)	10.4% (5th)	9.4% (11th)	10.2% (8th)
24	November 10, 2016	9.8% (14th)	11.7% (5th)	11.0% (5th)	11.8% (4th)
Average		9.4%	11.5%	10.5%	11.7%
In this table, the blue numbers represent the lowest ratings and the red numbers represent the highest ratings.

== Awards and nominations ==
Year	Award	Category	Recipient	Result
2016	1st Asia Artist Awards	Best Artist Award, Actor	Jo Jung-suk	Nominated
2016	SBS Drama Awards	Grand Prize (Daesang)	Jo Jung-suk	Nominated
2016	SBS Drama Awards	Top Excellence Award, Actor in a Romantic Comedy Drama	Jo Jung-suk	Won
2016	SBS Drama Awards	Top Excellence Award, Actor in a Romantic Comedy Drama	Go Kyung-pyo	Nominated
2016	SBS Drama Awards	Top Excellence Award, Actress in a Romantic Comedy Drama	Gong Hyo-jin	Won
2016	SBS Drama Awards	Top Excellence Award, Actress in a Romantic Comedy Drama	Lee Mi-sook	Nominated
2016	SBS Drama Awards	Special Acting Award, Actor in a Romantic Comedy Drama	Jung Sang-hoon	Nominated
2016	SBS Drama Awards	Special Acting Award, Actress in a Romantic Comedy Drama	Seo Ji-hye	Won
2016	SBS Drama Awards	Special Acting Award, Actress in a Romantic Comedy Drama	Bae Hae-sun	Nominated
2016	SBS Drama Awards	K-Wave Star Award	Jo Jung-suk	Nominated
2016	SBS Drama Awards	K-Wave Star Award	Gong Hyo Jin	Nominated
2016	SBS Drama Awards	Best Couple	Jo Jung-suk and Gong Hyo-jin	Nominated
2016	SBS Drama Awards	Best Couple	Lee Mi-sook and Park Ji-young	Nominated
2016	SBS Drama Awards	Top 10 Stars Award	Jo Jung-suk	Won
2016	SBS Drama Awards	New Star Award	Go Kyung-pyo	Won
2016	SBS Drama Awards	Idol Academy Award – Best Kiss	Jo Jung-suk and Gong Hyo-jin	Nominated
2017	53rd Baeksang Arts Awards	Best Actor	Jo Jung-suk	Nominated

== Miscelleanous ==
The show has been analyzed as "a case study of the application of the Tie-Up Theory to a romantic narrative as a form of simulation of human mating processes with social cognition valence".
