= My Annoying Brother =

2016 South Korean film by Kwon Soo-kyung

- Official poster
- 형
- Directed by: Kwon Soo-kyung
- Screenplay by: Yoo Young-ah
- Produced by: Lee Yong-nam; Choi Nak-kwon
- Starring: Jo Jung-suk; Doh Kyung-soo; Park Shin-hye
- Cinematography: Ki Se-hoon
- Edited by: Shin Min-kyung
- Music by: Park In-young; Kim Tae-seong
- Production company: Good Choice Cut Pictures
- Distributed by: CJ Entertainment
- Release date: November 23, 2016
- Running time: 110 mins
- Country: South Korea
- Language: Korean
- Box office: US$20.6 million

My Annoying Brother (Korean: 형; RR: Hyeong; lit. 'Older Brother') is a 2016 South Korean sport drama film starring Jo Jung-suk, Doh Kyung-soo and Park Shin-hye. It was released in South Korea by CJ Entertainment on November 23, 2016. The film topped local box office and hit more than one million views within four days of its release. The film reached 3 million views in mid December. The film was released in Japan on May 19, 2017.

== Plot ==
National Judo athlete Doo-young (Doh Kyung-soo) damages his optic nerves during an international event and loses his sight permanently. His older brother Doo-shik (Jo Jung-suk) who has been estranged from Doo-young, takes advantage of his brother's sudden crisis to get paroled from prison. To Doo-young who lost his parents in an accident as a teenager and had to fend for himself since then, the news of Doo-shik coming home is an extra stress to deal with. He's barely adjusting to the fact that he is now blind for the rest of his life but now he has to deal with his swindler brother. Although hesitant at first, Doo-young slowly eases up to his older brother, who gradually takes charge and helps him adjust to his disability. Just when the two brothers are starting to make amends, Doo-shik finds out that he's in the final stage of terminal cancer. He has only a short time to say farewell to his brother and help him win gold at Rio Paralympics, which will secure his future.

== Cast ==
=== Main cast ===
- Jo Jung-suk as Go Doo-shik
  - Jeon Ha-neul as Young Doo-shik
- Doh Kyung-soo as Go Doo-young
  - Jung Ji-hoon as Young Doo-young
- Park Shin-hye as Lee Soo-hyun

=== Others ===
- Kim Kang-hyun as Dae-chang
- Ji Dae-han as Director of the National athletes
- Lim Chul-hyung as Jong Neon-nam
- Lee Do-yeon as a girl in the club with Doo-young
- Kim Jin-hee as a girl in the club with Doo-shik
- Son San as Parole auditor
- Shim Hoon-gi as Parole auditor
- Jung Jae-jin Owner of Super
- Moon Ji-hyun as a Bank staff
- Kang Doo as Foreign car dealer
- Goo Hye-ryung as Staff of Department of rehabilitation
- Lee Sang-hoon as Staff of Department of rehabilitation
- Jung Yoo-jin as Young Lover
- Park Jae-han as Police
- Son Mi-hee as Hallway nurse
- Jung Dong-kyu as Doctor
- Lee Myung-ha as Woman in the hospital
- Chun Seok-hyun as A hospital employee
- Jeon Ki-young as Narrator
- Choi Min-ho as Narrator
- Bae Sung-jae as Judo caster
- Kwon Ji-hoon as Japanese player
- Mama Daleev Par as Turkish player
- Jo Won-hee as Doo-shik's father
- Lee Yeon-soo as Doo-shik's mother
- Noh Yeong-hee as A lady in the neighborhood
- Hong Myung-gi as Designated driver
- Kwon Beom-taek as Guard
- Lee Han-ni as Doctor's voice

== Production ==
Filming began on October 19, 2015, in Songpa, Seoul, South Korea and ended on December 31.

== Original soundtrack ==
No.	Title	Artists	Length
1.	"Don't Worry"	Jo Jung-suk, Doh Kyung-soo	4:19
2.	"Que Hermosa Es La Vida"	Michael Cartwright	2:44
3.	"Toward The World"	Park In-young	0:47
4.	"Farewell"	Park In-young	2:24
5.	"The Match"	Park In-young	5:54
6.	"Oh! Brother"	Park In-young	1:20
7.	"Phone"	Park In-young	2:51
Total length:			20:19

=== Chart performance ===
Title	Peak chart positions	Sales
Title	KOR Gaon	Sales
"Don't Worry" (Jo Jung-suk & Doh Kyung-soo)	100	KOR: 19,498

== Reception ==
Yonhap called the film a formulaic comedy but was nonetheless "funny and enjoyable" to watch. Both Jo and Do were praised for their performance and their chemistry which helped elevate the film.

== Awards and nominations ==
Year	Award	Category	Recipient	Result	Ref.
2017	53rd Baeksang Arts Awards	Best New Actor	Doh Kyung-soo	Nominated	
2017	53rd Baeksang Arts Awards	Most Popular Actor	Doh Kyung-soo	Won	
2017	Korean Film Shining Star Awards	Newcomer Award	Doh Kyung-soo	Won	
2017	13th JIMFF Awards	Star Award	Doh Kyung-soo	Won	
2017	38th Blue Dragon Film Awards	Best New Actor	Doh Kyung-soo	Won	
