= Oh My Ghost (South Korean TV series) =

2015 tvN television series

- Also known as: Oh My Ghostess
- Hangul: 오 나의 귀신님
- RR: O naui gwisinnim
- MR: O naŭi kwisinnim
- Genre: Romance; Comedy drama; Thriller
- Written by: Yang Hee-seung; Yang Seo-yoon
- Directed by: Yoo Je-won
- Starring: Park Bo-young; Jo Jung-suk; Lim Ju-hwan; Kim Seul-gi
- Composers: Im Ha-young; Yoo Jong-hyeon; Kim Sung-yool
- Country of origin: South Korea
- Original language: Korean
- No. of episodes: 16

Production
- Executive producers: Kim Sang-heon; Kim Young-gyu
- Producers: Jo Moon-joo; Lee So-yoon; Choi Jin-hee; Park Ji-young
- Cinematography: Choi Sang-mook; Lee Joo-young
- Editors: Jo Mi-hyeon; Lee Min-hee
- Running time: 60 minutes
- Production company: Chorokbaem Media

Original release
- Network: tvN
- Release: July 3 – August 22, 2015

Related
- Oh My Ghost (Thai TV series)

Oh My Ghost (Korean: 오 나의 귀신님) is a 2015 South Korean television series starring Park Bo-young, Jo Jung-suk, Lim Ju-hwan and Kim Seul-gi. It aired on tvN from July 3 to August 22, 2015, on Fridays and Saturdays at 20:30 (KST) for 16 episodes.

== Synopsis ==
Na Bong-sun (Park Bo-young) has an extremely timid personality and low self-esteem, doesn't have any close friends, and is constantly getting reprimanded at her job as an assistant chef at Sun Restaurant. She also occasionally sees ghosts, thanks to a shaman grandmother. One day, Bong-sun gets possessed by a lustful virgin ghost named Shin Soon-ae (Kim Seul-gi). To make up for the lack of romance in her short life and believing that only by losing her virginity will she be able to "resolve her grudge" and move on to the afterlife, Soon-ae is determined to seduce as many men as she can by possessing various women, and she finds the perfect vessel in Bong-sun.

Bong-sun's boss is arrogant star chef Kang Sun-woo (Jo Jung-suk), whom she secretly has a crush on. Sun-woo hasn't dated anyone since getting his heart broken by his college friend Lee So-hyung (Park Jung-ah), who's a TV producer. But when Bong-sun seemingly gets rid of her shyness and suddenly changes into a confident, dynamic woman, she finally catches his eye. Meanwhile, the mystery surrounding Soon-ae's death involves Sun-woo's brother-in-law, a kind police officer, Choi Sung-jae (Lim Ju-hwan), who may not be what he seems.

== Cast ==
- Park Bo-young as Na Bong-sun

Assistant chef at Sun Restaurant. She is shy, insecure, and always has a low self-esteem. Her life changes when she is possessed by Shin Soon-ae, which makes her seem more cheerful. She studied to be a Chef under Kang Sun-woo, and then she studied abroad after winning a cooking contest.

- Jo Jung-suk as Kang Sun-woo

The owner and head chef of Sun Restaurant, a professional chef specializing in pasta. He also opened a small restaurant with Korean fusion food. He has a not very good relationship with his mother but loves his sister very much.

- Lim Ju-hwan as Choi Sung-jae

A kind police officer. But actually, he is possessed by an evil spirit. He was the one who killed Shin Soon-ae because Soon-ae was an eyewitness when he was involved in the hit and run. Kang Eun-hee's husband.

- Kim Seul-gi as Shin Soon-ae

A ghost who's still hanging around because she hasn't finished her grudge. She thought that her grudge was being a virgin ghost, but in the end, she realized that her grudge was caused by an unjust death. She was killed by Choi Sung-jae.

- Park Jung-ah as Lee So-hyung

A television Program Director and Kang Sun-woo's first love.

- Shin Hye-sun as Kang Eun-hee

The younger sister of Kang Sun-woo, a former ballerina who became the victim of a hit and run that left her paralyzed. Worked as a Cashier at Sun Restaurant.

- Kang Ki-young as Heo Min-soo

Sous Chef at Sun Restaurant.

- Choi Min-chul as Jo Dong-chul

Chef at Sun Restaurant.

- Kwak Si-yang as Seo Joon

Chef at Sun Restaurant. He studied at Le Cordon Bleu.

- Oh Eui-shik as Choi Ji-woong

Chef at Sun Restaurant.

- Shin Eun-kyung as Jo Hye-young

Kang Sun-woo's mother, a teaching professor. She gave birth to at the age of 19, then worked while studying. She has no female friends because she was too busy dating and studying, and her only female friend is Seobinggo.

- Lee Dae-yeon as Shin Myung-ho

Shin Soon-ae's father. He runs a small restaurant whose main customers are taxi drivers.

- Lee Hak-joo as Shin Kyung-mo

Shin Soon-ae's younger brother. He is unemployed who only spends his time playing games. Later, he worked at Kang Sun-woo's second restaurant.

- Lee Jung-eun as Shaman in Seobinggo-dong

A shaman. Jo Hye-young's only female friend. She also close to Shin Soon-ae's ghost.

- Kim Sung-bum as Han Jin-goo

A police officer in charge of the hit-and-run case of Kang Eun-hee. He is Choi Sung-jae's partner. Later, he was killed by Choi Sung-jae.

- Choi Woong as Joo Chang-gyu / Yoon Chang-sub

So-hyung's late boyfriend and So-hyung's new boyfriend (double role).

- Lee Joo-sil as Bong-sun's grandmother

A shaman.

=== Special appearances ===
- Oh Hee-joon as Dormitory occupant
- Lee Do-yeop as pension owner
- Lee Ha-na as radio DJ (voice cameo) (ep. 1)
- Kim Hwan-hee as Yoon Chae-hee (ep. 8)
- Ryu Hyun-kyung as Officer Kang (ep. 13–14)
- Seo In-guk as Edward (ep. 16)
- Nam Gi-ae as Seo Bing-go's customer (ep. 16)
- Park Ji-yeon as Il Pal-gwi a ghost friend of virginal ghost, Shin Soon-ae

== Original soundtrack ==
Oh My Ghost OST

Soundtrack album by Various Artists
- Released: 2015
- Genres: Kpop; Soundtrack
- Language: Korean
- Label: CJ E&M

=== Part 1 ===
Released on July 10, 2015
No.	Title	Artist	Length
1.	"Stay" (이야기)	Ben	4:24
2.	"Stay" (Inst.)		4:24
Total length:			8:48

=== Part 2 ===
Released on July 24, 2015
No.	Title	Artist	Length
1.	"Oh My Ghost" (오나의귀신)	Han So Hyun	3:29
2.	"Oh My Ghost" (Trumpet ver.)		3:29
Total length:			7:58

=== Part 3 ===
Released on July 31, 2015
No.	Title	Artist	Length
1.	"Leave" (떠난다)	Park Bo-young	3:42
2.	"Leave" (Inst.)		3:42
Total length:			6:44

=== Part 4 ===
Released on August 14, 2015
No.	Title	Artist	Length
1.	"Eyes" (눈)	Jay Park	3:50
2.	"Eyes" (Inst.)		3:50
Total length:			8:00

=== OST Special ===
Released Date August 28, 2015
No.	Title	Artist	Length
1.	"Gimme a Chocolate"	Jo Jung-suk	4:05
2.	"Gimme a Chocolate" (Drama ver.)		3:36
3.	"Gimme a Chocolate" (Inst.)		4:05
Total length:			11:46

== Ratings ==
Average TV viewership ratings
Ep.	Original broadcast date	Average audience share (Nationwide)	
Ep.	Original broadcast date	Nielsen Korea	TNmS
1	July 3, 2015	2.65%	3.2%
2	July 4, 2015	2.66%	3.3%
3	July 10, 2015	3.37%	3.9%
4	July 11, 2015	2.98%	4.2%
5	July 17, 2015	3.59%	3.8%
6	July 18, 2015	3.35%	4.2%
7	July 24, 2015	3.80%	3.8%
8	July 25, 2015	3.60%	4.8%
9	July 31, 2015	3.66%	4.6%
10	August 1, 2015	3.49%	4.8%
11	August 7, 2015	4.21%	4.7%
12	August 8, 2015	4.39%	4.9%
13	August 14, 2015	5.08%	6.1%
14	August 15, 2015	5.45%	6.1%
15	August 21, 2015	5.34%	6.2%
16	August 22, 2015	7.34%	8.0%
Average		4.06%	4.8%
In the table above, the blue numbers represent the lowest ratings and the red numbers represent the highest ratings.; This series aired on a cable channel/pay TV which normally has a relatively smaller audience compared to free-to-air TV/public broadcasters (KBS, SBS, MBC and EBS).

== Awards and nominations ==
Year	Award	Category	Recipient	Result
2015	8th Korea Drama Awards	Excellence Award, Actor	Jo Jung-suk	Nominated
2015	4th APAN Star Awards	Excellence Award, Actor in a Miniseries	Jo Jung-suk	Nominated
2015	4th APAN Star Awards	Excellence Award, Actress in a Miniseries	Park Bo-young	Won
2016	4th Annual DramaFever Awards	Best Actress	Park Bo-young	Won
2016	4th Annual DramaFever Awards	Best Actor	Jo Jung-suk	Nominated
2016	4th Annual DramaFever Awards	Best Supporting Actress	Kim Seul-gi	Won
2016	4th Annual DramaFever Awards	Best Kiss	Jo Jung-suk and Park Bo-young	Nominated
2016	4th Annual DramaFever Awards	Best Couple	Jo Jung-suk and Park Bo-young	Nominated
2016	4th Annual DramaFever Awards	Best Korean Drama – Comedy	Oh My Ghost	Nominated
2016	4th Annual DramaFever Awards	Best Villain	Lim Ju-hwan	Nominated
2016	4th Annual DramaFever Awards	Best Ensemble	Jo Jung-suk, Kang Ki-young, Choi Min-chul, Kwak Si-yang, Oh Ui-sik	Nominated
2016	4th Annual DramaFever Awards	Best Womance	Park Bo-young and Kim Seul-gi	Nominated
2016	52nd Baeksang Arts Awards	Most Popular Actress (TV)	Park Bo-young	Nominated
2016	52nd Baeksang Arts Awards	Most Popular Actor (TV)	Jo Jung-suk	Nominated
2016	52nd Baeksang Arts Awards	Best Scriptwriter (TV)	Yang Hee-seung	Nominated
2016	tvN10 Awards	Best Content Award, Drama	Oh My Ghost	Won
2016	tvN10 Awards	Romantic-Comedy King	Jo Jung-suk	Nominated
2016	tvN10 Awards	Romantic-Comedy Queen	Park Bo-young	Nominated
2016	tvN10 Awards	Two Star Award	Jo Jung-suk	Won
2016	tvN10 Awards	Best Kiss Award	Jo Jung-suk and Park Bo-young	Nominated
2016	tvN10 Awards	Best Chemistry Award	Park Bo-young and Kim Seul-gi	Won

== Remake ==
In September 2018, the Thai remake of the same title premiered on True4U. It stars Nuengthida Sophon as Jiew, Keerati Mahaplearkpong as Khaopun, and Arak Amornsupasiri as Chef Artit.
