= Ahn Gil-kang =

South Korean actor (born 1966)

- Born: August 24, 1966 (age 60); South Korea
- Occupation: Actor
- Years active: 1997–present
- Agent: Star Page Entertainment

Korean name
- Hangul: 안길강
- Hanja: 安吉江
- RR: An Gilgang
- MR: An Kilgang

Ahn Gil-kang (Korean: 안길강; born August 24, 1966) is a South Korean actor. He frequently appears as a supporting actor in director Ryoo Seung-wan's films, such as Die Bad (2000), Crying Fist (2005), The City of Violence (2006), and Dachimawa Lee (2008). Ahn also played a supporting role in the period drama series Queen Seondeok (2009), for which he received a Golden Acting Award at the MBC Drama Awards.

== Filmography ==
=== Film ===
Year	Title	Role	Notes	Ref.
1997	Trio			
2000	Die Bad			
2000	Dachimawa Lee		Short film	
2002	2009: Lost Memories	Lee Myung-hak		
2002	No Blood No Tears			
2002	Turning Gate			
2002	Resurrection of the Little Match Girl			
2002	Saving My Hubby			
2002	Conduct Zero	Taekwondo instructor		
2004	Will Be Okay		Short film	
2004	Taegukgi	Sergeant Huh		
2004	Arahan	Kkang Tong		
2005	Crying Fist	Head warden		
2005	Sad Movie	Guy in red training suit	Cameo	
2005	The Beast and the Beauty	Choi Do-sik		
2005	Time Between Dog and Wolf	Kim		
2006	Running Wild	Yang Ki-taek		
2006	Hey Man	Joon Chul	Short film from If You Were Me 2	
2006	Romance	Commando general	Special appearance	
2006	The City of Violence	Wang-jae		
2006	Holy Daddy	Angel		
2006	Heart Is...	Gang Boss		
2006	How the Lack of Love Affects Two Men	Bakery man		
2007	Le Grand Chef	Sung-il		
2007	Hero			
2008	Once Upon a Time	Jang-cheon		
2008	Dachimawa Lee	Jin-sang 6		
2008	Once Upon a Time in Seoul	Myeong-soo		
2009	A Ghost's Story			
2010	The Unjust	Team leader		
2010	Hello Ghost	Co. President		
2011	The Suicide Forecast	Owner of baseball supply shop	Special appearance	
2011	Moby Dick	Detective Ma	Special appearance	
2011	Punch	Coach		
2011	You're My Pet	Chief Editor		
2012	Circle of Crime	Shim Chang-hyun		
2014	Man on High Heels	Master Park		
2014	The Divine Move	Carpenter Heo		
2014	Mad Sad Bad	Seung-ho's father		
2014	Slow Video	Baek-gu's father		
2015	Veteran	Police Superintendent	Cameo	
2016	Chasing	CEO Wang		
2018	On Your Wedding Day	Woo-yeon's father		
2019	Cheer Up, Mr. Lee	Mr. Kim		

=== Television series ===
Year	Title	Role	Notes	Ref.
2006	Invincible Parachute Agent	Yang Soo-gil		
2007	The King and I	Kae Do-chi		
2008	Iljimae	Kong Gal-a-jae		
2009	Queen Seondeok	Chil-sook		
2010	The Slave Hunters	Jjak-gwi		
2010	Coffee House	Seung-yeon's dad		
2011	Dream High	Ma Doo-sik		
2011	Gyebaek	Kwi-woon		
2011	Lights and Shadows	No Sang-taek		
2012	The Great Seer	Monk Moo-hak		
2014	Three Days	Kim Sang-hee		
2014	The Idle Mermaid	An Ma-nyeo		
2014	My Secret Hotel	Kim Geum-bo		
2014	Naeil's Cantabile	Yoo Won-sang		
2014	Drama Festival – "House, Mate"			
2015	Shine or Go Crazy	Gang-myeong		
2015	Orange Marmalade	Baek Seung-hoon		
2015	Six Flying Dragons	Jo So-saeng		
2016	Cheese in the Trap	Hong Jin-tak		
2016	The Royal Gambler	Kim Che-geon		
2016	Secret Healer		Special appearance	
2016	Weightlifting Fairy Kim Bok-joo	Kim Chang-gul		
2017	Binggoo	Head of Arts Team		
2017	Queen of Mystery	Bae Gwang-tae		
2017	Bad Thief, Good Thief	Jang Pan-soo		
2017	Hit the Top		Special appearance, Ep. 2	
2017	Reunited Worlds	An Tae-bok		
2018	Children of a Lesser God	Kim Ho-ki		
2018	Queen of Mystery 2	Bae Gwang-tae	Special appearance, Ep. 1	
2018	Tale of Fairy	Teacher Goo		
2019	Watcher	Kim Jae-Myung		
2019	Nokdu Flower	Hae Seung		
2020	Once Again	Yang Chi-soo		
2020	Memorials	Koo Young-tae		
2020	Tale of the Nine Tailed	Hyun Ui-ong		
2021	Sell Your Haunted House	Do Hak-seong		
2021	Dali & Cocky Prince	Jin Baek-won		
2022	The Driver	Ho-cheol		
2023	Moon in the Day	General Gaya	Special appearance	
2025	Mercy for None	Gu Bong-san		

=== Web shows ===
Year	Title	Role	Ref.
2022	I Want to Go to Disney	Cast Member	

== Theater ==
- View from the Mirror (거울 보기)
- Saint Joan of the Stockyards
- Spring Day (봄날)
- The Cypress Tree in the Front Yard (뜰 앞에 잣나무)

== Awards and nominations ==
Name of the award ceremony, year presented, category, nominee of the award, and the result of the nomination
Award ceremony	Year	Category	Nominee / Work	Result	Ref.
KBS Drama Awards	2021	Best Supporting Actor	Sell Your Haunted House	Nominated	
MBC Drama Awards	2009	Golden Acting Award, Best Supporting Actor	Queen Seondeok	Won	
MBC Drama Awards	2017	Golden Acting Award, Actor in a Weekend Drama	Bad Thief, Good Thief	Won	
