= Intimate Enemies =

Intimate Enemies may refer to:

- Intimate Enemies (2007 film), 2007 French war film
- Intimate Enemies (2015 film), 2015 South Korean film
