= Nam Na-yeong =

South Korean film editor (born 1970)

- Born: 1970 (age 55–56); Busan, South Korea
- Education: Kyungsung University
- Occupations: Film editor, negative cutter
- Years active: 1997–present

Korean name
- Hangul: 남나영
- RR: Nam Nayeong
- MR: Nam Nayŏng

Nam Na-yeong (Korean: 남나영; born 1970) is a South Korean film editor and negative cutter. She has edited films with directors Ryoo Seung-wan (Arahan, The City of Violence, and Crying Fist), Kim Jee-woon (The Good, the Bad, the Weird and I Saw the Devil), and Kang Hyeong-cheol (Scandal Makers, Sunny, and Tazza: The Hidden Card). As of 2020, Nam has edited more than 60 films.

== Early life and career ==
Nam was born in 1970, in Busan, South Korea. She graduated from Kyungsung University's department of theater and film.

Nam began her career as a negative cutter in 1997. Her career as a film editor began with the 2002 film Wet Dreams, and went on to work with established South Korean film directors, including Ryoo Seung-wan (Arahan, The City of Violence, and Crying Fist), Kim Jee-woon (The Good, the Bad, the Weird and I Saw the Devil), and Kang Hyeong-cheol (Scandal Makers, Sunny, and Tazza: The Hidden Card).

== Recognitions ==
Nam was nominated in the Best Editing category for her works on Arahan, The Good, the Bad, the Weird, Scandal Makers, and Confession of Murder; and won for Crying Fist and Masquerade. She won an Asian Film Award for I Saw the Devil; and at the Blue Dragon Awards, she won for Masquerade and was nominated for Tazza: The Hidden Card.

== Filmography ==
Year	English title	Korean title	Notes
2024	Badland Hunters	황야	
2023	Honey Sweet	달짝지근해: 7510	
2023	Dream	드림	
2021	Romance Without Love	연애 빠진 로맨스	
2019	Jo Pil-ho: The Dawning Rage	악질경찰	
2018	The Princess and the Matchmaker	궁합	
2014	No Tears for the Dead	우는 남자	
2013	Flu	감기	
2011	Sunny	써니	
2010	Petty Romance	쩨쩨한 로맨스	
2010	Foxy Festival	페스티발	
2010	Desire to Kill	죽이고 싶은	
2010	I Saw the Devil	악마를 보았다	
2010	Secret Reunion	의형제	
2009	Just Friends?	친구 사이?	
2009	Mother	마더	Negative cutter
2009	Castaway on the Moon	김씨 표류기	
2009	Insadong Scandal	인사동 스캔들	
2009	Private Eye	그림자 살인	
2008	Scandal Makers	과속스캔들	
2008	Dachimawa Lee	다찌마와 리 - 악인이여 지옥행 급행열차를 타라!	
2008	The Good, the Bad, the Weird	좋은 놈, 나쁜 놈, 이상한 놈	
2008	His Last Gift	마지막 선물	
2007	2 Faces of My Girlfriend	두 얼굴의 여친	
2007	The Houseguest and My Mother	사랑방 선수와 어머니	Not to be confused with the 1961 film of the same name.
2007	Black House	검은 집	
2007	Hwang Jin Yi	황진이	
2006	The Restless	중천 (中天)	
2006	Marrying the Mafia III	가문의 부활 - 가문의 영광 3	
2006	Like a Virgin	천하장사 마돈나	
2006	The City of Violence	짝패	
2006	Oh! My God	구세주	
2005	Shadowless Sword	무영검 - 無影劍	
2005	Love in Magic	연애술사	
2005	Crying Fist	주먹이 운다	
2005	Wet Dreams 2	몽정기 2	
2004	Shinsukki Blues	신석기 블루스	
2004	Some	썸	
2004	A Family	가족	
2004	R-Point	알 포인트	
2004	Doll Master	인형사	
2004	Arahan	아라한-장풍 대작전	
2003	Please Teach Me English	영어완전정복	
2003	Mr. Butterfly	나비	
2002	Wet Dreams	몽정기	
2001	My Boss, My Hero	두사부일체 (頭師父一體)	
1997	No. 3	넘버 3	
