= Sunny (2011 film) =

2011 film directed by Kang Hyeong-cheol

- Theatrical release poster
- Hangul: 써니
- RR: Sseoni
- MR: Ssŏni
- Directed by: Kang Hyeong-cheol
- Written by: Kang Hyeong-cheol
- Produced by: Ahn Byeong-ki; Ahn In-ki
- Starring: Yoo Ho-jeong; Jin Hee-kyung; Go Soo-hee; Hong Jin-hee; Lee Yeon-kyung; Kim Sun-kyung; Shim Eun-kyung; Kang So-ra; Kim Min-young; Park Jin-joo; Nam Bo-ra; Kim Bo-mi; Min Hyo-rin
- Cinematography: Lee Hyung-deok
- Edited by: Nam Na-yeong
- Music by: Kim Jun-seok
- Production companies: Toilet Pictures; Aloha Pictures
- Distributed by: CJ Entertainment
- Release date: 4 May 2011
- Running time: 124 minutes
- Country: South Korea
- Language: Korean
- Budget: US$5.5 million
- Box office: US$51.1 million

Sunny (Korean: 써니) is a 2011 South Korean comedy-drama film. The film is about a middle-aged woman who tries to fulfill her friend's dying wish of reuniting their group of high school friends. The film alternates between two timelines: the present day where the women are middle-aged, and the 1980s when they were in high school. It is the second film by writer-director Kang Hyeong-cheol, who previously directed Scandal Makers (2008).

Released on 4 May 2011, Sunny was the first film of that year to sell five million tickets in South Korea, and became the second highest-grossing South Korean film by the end of the year. As of 20 September 2012, it is the 13th best-selling film of all-time in South Korea. Kang Hyeong-cheol and Nam Na-yeong won Best Director and Best Editing, respectively, at the Grand Bell Awards. Actress Kang So-ra won several awards for her role as the teenage girl Ha Chun-hwa.

== Plot ==
Im Na-mi, a wealthy but depressed housewife, feels disconnected from her family and lonely in her seemingly perfect life. Her husband and daughter are indifferent towards her, and she eats breakfast alone every morning. One day, she visits her mother in the hospital and recalls her high school days upon seeing the name "Ha Chun-hwa" on a patient's room.

Na-mi then visits her old teacher at the high school she once studied at and is then taken back to her teenage years, where she is introduced as a new student in an all-girls high school in Seoul. Initially ridiculed for her country accent and appearance, she befriends Ha Chun-hwa and joins her group of friends called "Sunny." The group consists of six other girls: eyelashes-obsessed Kim Jang-mi, foul-mouthed Hwang Jin-hee, writer's daughter Seo Geum-ok, beauty queen wannabe Ryu Bok-hee, and the school goddess but distant Jung Su-ji. They bond over shared experiences and adventures, including a memorable rivalry with another school group at a police riot. Na-mi also experiences her first love with Han Joon-ho, Jang-mi's brother friend, but ends her feelings towards him when she sees him with Su-ji.

In the present, Na-mi discovers Chun-hwa is terminally ill and wishes to reunite "Sunny". With help from her old teacher and a private detective, Na-mi finds all the group members and learns about their diverse, often troubled lives. Jang-mi is now a struggling insurance agent, Jin-hee is now an elegant woman with a cheating husband, Geum-ok is unemployed and living in a cramped space, Bok-hee has turned to prostitution while her daughter is in the hospital, and Su-ji remains elusive. Na-mi eventually finds Joon-ho and gets closure on her past feelings for him.

Back in the past, a girl named Sang-mi who is jealous of Na-mi getting along with "Sunny" and tries bullying her, but Su-ji arrives to save Na-mi from Sang-mi; both of them later get along. At the annual school festival, Sang-mi, who is now out of control, once again tries to torment Na-mi and Chun-hwa. She ends up fighting with her, but the fight ends horribly when Sang-mi cuts Su-ji's face with the piece of glass she was holding, causing Su-ji to scream in shock before being taken away by an ambulance. As a result of this incident, the "Sunny" members were beaten by the principal. Later that night, Na-mi meets the "Sunny" group members in front of Su-ji's house and everyone joins hands at the insistence of Chun-hwa, making a promise that they will meet again in the future no matter what happens.

Despite Chun-hwa passing away before the reunion, the women rekindle their friendship and joy in life. They also get revenge on a group of girls bullying Na-mi's daughter. At Chun-hwa's funeral, all of the members show up except for Su-ji. Then the lawyer reads Chun-hwa's will, which includes thoughtful gifts and opportunities for each member of "Sunny". They celebrate Chun-hwa's life by dancing to their old dance routine, and Su-ji makes a surprise appearance, completing their reunion. The film ends with nostalgic flashbacks to their teenage years.

== Cast ==
Present

- Yoo Ho-jeong as Im Na-mi
- Jin Hee-kyung as Ha Chun-hwa
- Go Soo-hee as Kim Jang-mi
- Hong Jin-hee as Hwang Jin-hee
- Lee Yeon-kyung as Seo Geum-ok
- Kim Sun-kyung as Ryu Bok-hee
- Yoon Jung as Jung Su-ji
- Baek Jong-hak as Na-mi's husband
- Ha Seung-ri as Ye-bin, Na-mi's daughter
- Jung Suk-yong as Jong-ki, Na-mi's older brother
- Lee Jun-hyeok as Owner of private detective agency
- Lee Geung-young as Han Joon-ho
- Kim Shi-hoo as Joon-ho's son
- Kim Ji-kyung as Jin-hee's husband
- Joo-ho as Insurance company manager
- Cha Tae-hyun as Model of insurance company
- Kim Joon-ho as Private detective
- Sung Ji-ru as Chun-hwa's lawyer

1980s

- Shim Eun-kyung as Im Na-mi
- Kang So-ra as Ha Chun-hwa
- Kim Min-young as Kim Jang-mi
- Park Jin-joo as Hwang Jin-hee
- Nam Bo-ra as Seo Geum-ok
- Kim Bo-mi as Ryu Bok-hee
- Min Hyo-rin as Jung Su-ji
- Kim Shi-hoo as Han Joon-ho
- Kim Young-ok as Na-mi's grandmother
- Jung Won-joong as Na-mi's father
- Kim Hye-ok as Na-mi's mother
- Park Young-seo as Jong-ki, Na-mi's older brother
- Chun Woo-hee as Sang-mi
- Kim Ye-won as Leader of rival gang "Girls' Generation"
- Ryu Hye-rin as Member of band "Girl's Generation"
- So Hee-jung as Homeroom teacher
- Kim Won-hae as Student liaison teacher
- Park Hee-jung as Young-jin
- Han Seung-hyun as Jang-mi's older brother
- Kang Ji-won as Su-jin's stepmother
- Kang Rae-yeon as Jong-ki's girlfriend
- Yang Hee-kyung as Jang-mi's mother

== Allusions ==
The flashback scenes juxtaposed the fun and silly, drama-filled lives of high school students with the Gwangju Uprising that took place in May 1980. In the film, Na-mi's brother is a university student who participates in the protests. The scenes where Sunny fights the rival gang are backgrounded with the violent clash between the protestors and the military.

The movie's release was timely with the entertainment industry's focus on 1980s musicals, films, and pop music. Western brands and products were abundantly present in the flashback portions of the film. The trendy high school students all wore Nike and Adidas. A billboard for Rocky was visible in the background of the fight between Sunny and their rivals. The music also referenced songs from the 1980s including "Touch by Touch" by Joy, "Girls Just Want to Have Fun" by Cyndi Lauper, "Reality" by Richard Sanderson, and Boney M.'s 1976 cover of Bobby Hebb's song "Sunny," as well as the Korean pop songs "In My Dreams" by Jo Duk-bae and "I See" by Nami.

== Original soundtrack ==
The album is comprised by instrumentals composed by music director Kim Jun-seok that express the characters' emotional state. The film also featured a mix of 1980s Korean and Western pop music to evoke nostalgia, and to signify the Western "fad" that swept over students in Korea at the time.

Sunny Original Motion Picture Score
No.	Title	Artist	Length
1.	"시간여행" (Time travel)	Kim Jun-seok
2.	"Main Theme of Sunny"	Kim Jun-seok
3.	"Like Mom, Like Daughter"	Kim Jun-seok
4.	"Shadowing Stealthily"	Kim Jun-seok
5.	"Nami, blind with love"	Kim Jun-seok
6.	"Sunny vs. 소녀시대" (Sunny vs. Girls' Generation)	Kim Jun-seok
7.	"The realization of a just society"	Kim Jun-seok
8.	"친구를 찾아" (Find a friend)	Kim Jun-seok
9.	"꿈꾸던 소녀" (Dream girl)	Kim Jun-seok
10.	"A Little Girl, Nami"	Kim Jun-seok
11.	"추억의 기차" (Train of memories)	Kim Jun-seok
12.	"오래된 약속" (An old promise)	Kim Jun-seok
13.	"Close to my friend"	Kim Jun-seok
14.	"마지막 선물" (Last gift)	Kim Jun-seok
15.	"오랜만의 재회" (Reunion)	Kim Jun-seok
16.	"빙글빙글" (Round and Round)	Sunny cast
Total length:			30:55

== Release ==
The film was released on 4 May 2011 in South Korea. It also received a limited release in the United States in July 2011, screening in Los Angeles, Torrance, New York City, New Jersey, Chicago, Virginia, Washington D.C., Seattle, Texas and Hawaii.

=== Film festivals ===
The film has been shown in film festivals worldwide:

Event	Location	Event dates	Category/Remarks
16th Busan International Film Festival	Busan, South Korea	6–14 October 2011	Korean Cinema Today: Panorama *Director's Cut
6th Korean Film Festival in Paris	Paris, France	11–18 October 2011	Opening Night Film *European Premiere
13th Mumbai Film Festival	Mumbai, India	13–30 October 2011	World Cinema
6th London Korean Film Festival	London, England	4–10 November 2011	Contemporary Korean Cinema
10th New York Korean Film Festival	New York City, United States	24–26 February 2012	
7th Osaka Asian Film Festival	Osaka, Japan	9–18 March 2012	Special Screenings
2nd San Diego Asian Film Foundation Spring Showcase	San Diego, United States	19–26 April 2012	Opening Night Film
14th Udine Far East Film Festival	Udine, Italy	20–28 April 2012	Opening Night Film
16th Fantasia International Film Festival	Montreal, Quebec, Canada	19 July–9 August 2012	
3rd Korean Film Festival in Australia	Sydney, Australia	22–28 September 2012	Closing Night Film
2013 Korean Film Festival	Manila, Philippines	18 September −10 October 2013	

== Reception ==
=== Box office ===
In 2011, the movie sold 7,375,110 tickets, and grossed ₩54,034,324,100 (US$47,068,227), making it the year's second highest grossing Korean film and fourth highest grossing overall film in South Korea. At the end of the movie's run, it had sold 7.38 million admissions, with an additional 90,555 from a director's cut.

=== Awards and nominations ===
Year	Award	Category	Recipient	Result
2011	5th Mnet 20's Choice Awards	Hot Movie Star	Kang So-ra	Won
2011	20th Buil Film Awards	Best New Actress	Kang So-ra	Won
2011	48th Grand Bell Awards	Best Film	Sunny	Nominated
2011	48th Grand Bell Awards	Best Director	Kang Hyeong-cheol	Won
2011	48th Grand Bell Awards	Best Supporting Actress	Chun Woo-hee	Nominated
2011	48th Grand Bell Awards	Best New Actress	Kang So-ra	Nominated
2011	48th Grand Bell Awards	Best Screenplay	Kang Hyeong-cheol	Nominated
2011	48th Grand Bell Awards	Best Planning	Ahn Byeong-ki, Lee Anna	Nominated
2011	48th Grand Bell Awards	Best Editing	Nam Na-yeong	Won
2011	48th Grand Bell Awards	Best Costume Design	Chae Kyung-hwa	Nominated
2011	48th Grand Bell Awards	Best Music	Kim Jun-seok	Nominated
2011	32nd Blue Dragon Film Awards	Best Film	Sunny	Nominated
2011	32nd Blue Dragon Film Awards	Best Director	Kang Hyeong-cheol	Nominated
2011	32nd Blue Dragon Film Awards	Best Supporting Actress	Chun Woo-hee	Nominated
2011	32nd Blue Dragon Film Awards	Best New Actress	Kang So-ra	Nominated
2011	32nd Blue Dragon Film Awards	Best Screenplay	Kang Hyeong-cheol	Nominated
2011	32nd Blue Dragon Film Awards	Best Art Direction	Lee Yo-han	Nominated
2011	32nd Blue Dragon Film Awards	Best Music	Kim Jun-seok	Nominated
2011	32nd Blue Dragon Film Awards	Technical Award	Nam Na-yeong (editing)	Nominated
2011	19th Korean Culture and Entertainment Awards	Grand Prize (Daesang) for Film	Sunny	Won
2011	19th Korean Culture and Entertainment Awards	Best New Actress	Min Hyo-rin	Won
2011	4th Style Icon Awards	Content of the Year	Sunny	Won
2012	3rd KOFRA Film Awards	Best Director	Kang Hyeong-cheol	Won
2012	48th Baeksang Arts Awards	Best Film	Sunny	Nominated
2012	48th Baeksang Arts Awards	Best Actress	Shim Eun-kyung	Nominated
2012	48th Baeksang Arts Awards	Best New Actress	Kang So-ra	Nominated
2012	48th Baeksang Arts Awards	Most Popular Actress	Kang So-ra	Won

== Remakes ==
Hong Kong television series Never Dance Alone, which aired on TVB in 2014, is reportedly inspired by this movie. The remake is not official.

The 2016 Mongolian film "6th Wish" was inspired by the film.

A Hollywood remake of the movie was announced to be in production in 2016, but has yet to be made.

A Vietnamese remake of the movie, titled Tháng Năm Rực Rỡ (Go Go Sisters) was released on 9 March 2018. It topped the Southeast Asian country’s box office in its opening weekend (collecting 490,000 views) and received overwhelming positive feedback from the media, movie reviewers, and public audiences.

A Japanese remake of the movie, titled Sunny: Our Hearts Beat Together (Sunny: Tsuyoi Kimochi Tsuyoi Ai, lit. Sunny: Strong Mind Strong Love) was released on 31 August 2018. An Indonesian adaptation remake of the movie, titled Bebas (Glorious Days) was released on 3 October 2019.

A Chinese remake of the movie, titled Sunny Sisters (Chinese: 阳光姐妹淘) was released on 11 June 2021.

A Philippine adaptation of the movie by Viva Films was released on 10 April 2024.
