= List of awards and nominations received by Girl's Day =

Girl's Day awards and nominations
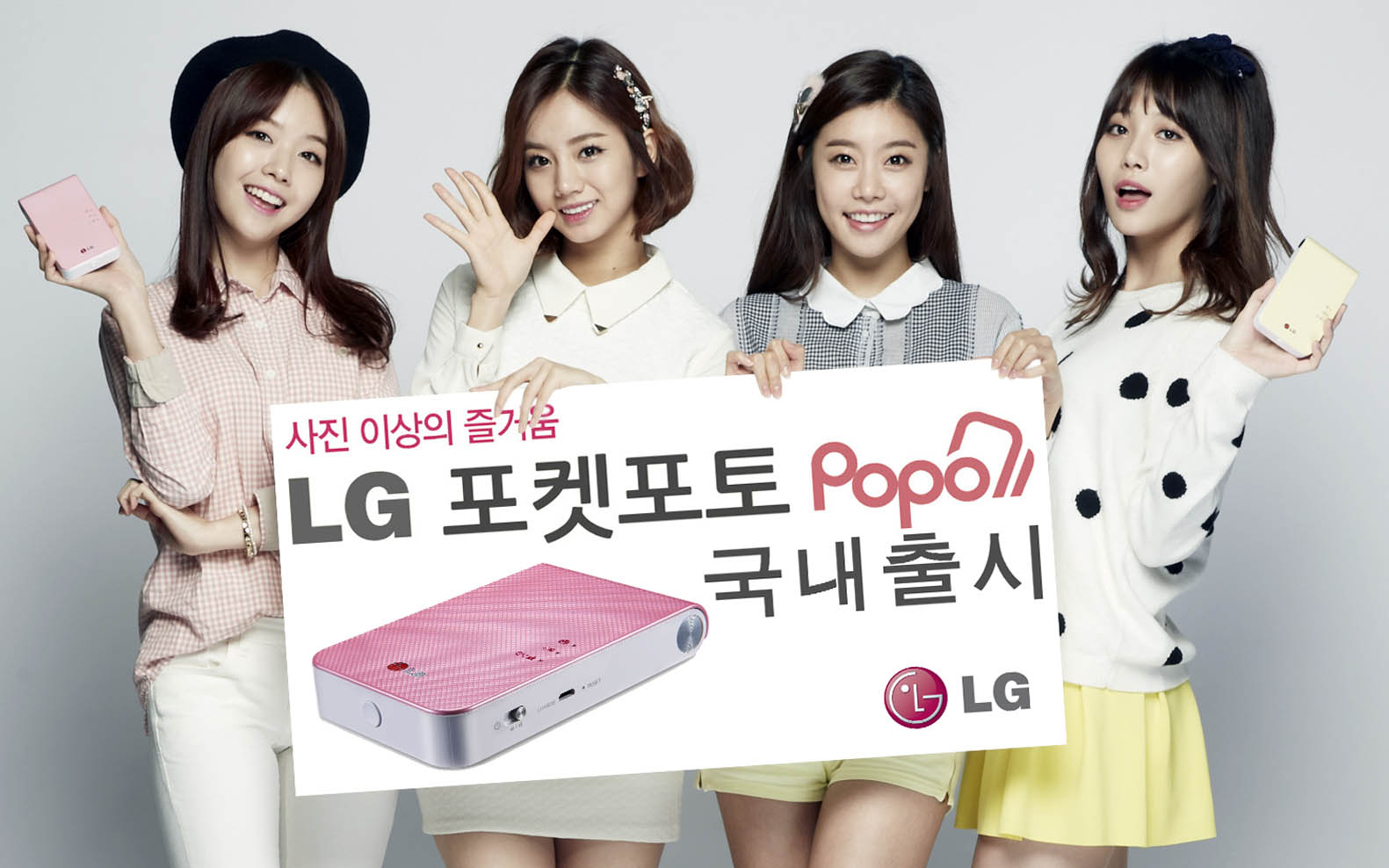
Awards and nominations
Award	Wins	Nominations
Asian Model Festival Awards	1	1
Cable TV Star Awards	1	1
Ceci Star Awards	0	1
Culture Technology Awards Ceremony	1	1
Gaon Chart Music Awards	3	4
Golden Disc Awards	1	1
Korea Wave Awards	1	1
Korean Culture Entertainment Awards	3	3
Korean PD Awards	1	1
Korean Popular Culture & Arts Awards	1	1
Melon Music Awards	1	4
Mnet Asian Music Awards	1	8
Republic of Korea Entertainment Arts Awards	1	1
SBS Awards Festival	1	2
SBS MTV Best of the Best	0	3
Seoul Music Awards	1	5
Seoul Success Awards	1	1
Style Icon Awards	0	1
The Bride Awards	1	1
V Live Awards	1	1
World Music Awards	0	4

Totals (Note: Certain award groups do not simply award one winner. They acknowledge several different recipients, have runners-up, and have third place. Since this is a specific recognition and is different from losing an award, runner-up mentions are considered wins in this award tally. For simplification and to avoid errors, each award in this list has been presumed to have had a prior nomination.)
- Wins: 21
- Nominations: 46

This is a list of awards and nominations received by South Korean girl group Girl's Day since their debut in 2010.

== Awards and nominations ==
Name of the award ceremony, year presented, category, nominee of the award, and the result of the nomination
Award ceremony	Year	Category	Nominee / Work	Result	Ref.
Asian Model Awards	2014	Popularity Award	Girl's Day	Won	
Cable TV Star Awards	2014	Cable TV Star	Girl's Day	Won	
Ceci Star Awards	2015	Best K-pop Girl Group	Girl's Day	Nominated	
Culture Technology Awards Ceremony	2015	Artist Award	Girl's Day	Won	
Gaon Chart Music Awards	2012	Discovery of the Year	Girl's Day	Won	
Gaon Chart Music Awards	2014	15 Weeks Over Top 50	"Expectation"	Won	
Gaon Chart Music Awards	2015	Song of the Year (January)	"Something"	Won	
Gaon Chart Music Awards	2016	Global Popularity Award	Girl's Day	Nominated	
Golden Disc Awards	2015	Digital Bonsang	"Something"	Won	
Korea Wave Awards	2016	Pop Culture Award	Girls' Day	Won	
Korean Culture Entertainment Awards	2010	New Generation Popular Music Teen Singer Award	Girls' Day	Won	
Korean Culture Entertainment Awards	2012	Idol Music Excellence Award	Girls' Day	Won	
Korean Culture Entertainment Awards	2013	Idol Excellence Award	Girls' Day	Won	
Korean PD Awards	2015	Performer of the Year - Singer Award (Daesang)	Girls' Day	Won	
Korean Popular Culture & Arts Awards	2015	Minister of Culture, Sports and Pop Culture Award	Girls' Day	Won	
Melon Music Awards	2014	Top 10	Girls' Day	Won	
Melon Music Awards	2014	Music Video Award	"Something"	Nominated	
Melon Music Awards	2014	Song of the Year	"Something"	Nominated	
Melon Music Awards	2014	Artist of the Year	Girl's Day	Nominated	
Mnet Asian Music Awards	2013	Song of the Year	"Expectation"	Nominated	
Mnet Asian Music Awards	2013	Best Dance Performance by a Female Group	"Expectation"	Nominated	
Mnet Asian Music Awards	2014	Best Female Group	Girl's Day	Nominated	
Mnet Asian Music Awards	2014	Best Dance Performance by a Female Group	"Something"	Won	
Mnet Asian Music Awards	2014	BC - UnionPay Artist of the Year	Girl's Day	Nominated	
Mnet Asian Music Awards	2014	BC - UnionPay Song of the Year	"Something"	Nominated	
Mnet Asian Music Awards	2015	Best Dance Performance by a Female Group	"Ring My Bell"	Nominated	
Mnet Asian Music Awards	2015	BC - UnionPay Song of the Year	"Ring My Bell"	Nominated	
Republic of Korea Entertainment Arts Awards	2011	Best Female Rookie Award	Girl's Day	Won	
SBS Awards Festival	2014	Top 10 Artists	Girl's Day	Won	
SBS Awards Festival	2015	Chinese Netizen Popularity Award	Girl's Day	Nominated	
SBS MTV Best of the Best	2013	Best Female Group	Girl's Day	Nominated	
SBS MTV Best of the Best	2014	Best Female Group	Girl's Day	Nominated	
SBS MTV Best of the Best	2014	Artist of the Year	Girl's Day	Nominated	
Seoul Music Awards	2015	Bonsang Award	"Something"	Won	
Seoul Music Awards	2015	Popularity Award	Girl's Day	Nominated	
Seoul Music Awards	2015	Hallyu Special Award	Girl's Day	Nominated	
Seoul Music Awards	2016	Bonsang Award	"Ring My Bell"	Nominated	
Seoul Music Awards	2016	Popularity Award	Girl's Day	Nominated	
Seoul Success Awards	2010	Cultural Award	Girl's Day	Won	
Style Icon Awards	2014	Top 10 Style Icons	Girl's Day	Nominated	
The Bride Awards	2017	Global Star	Girl's Day	Won	
V Live Awards	2017	Special V LIVE	Girl's Day	Won	
World Music Awards	2014	World's Best Song	"Something"	Nominated	
World Music Awards	2014	World's Best Video	"Something"	Nominated	
World Music Awards	2014	World's Best Group	Girl's Day	Nominated	
World Music Awards	2014	World's Best Live Act	Girl's Day	Nominated	

== Other accolades ==
=== Lists ===
Name of publisher, year listed, name of listicle, and placement
Publisher	Year	List	Rank	Ref.
Forbes	2014	Korea Power Celebrity	26th	
Forbes	2015	Korea Power Celebrity	13th	
Forbes	2016	Korea Power Celebrity	26th	
