= Red Carpet (film) =

- Theatrical poster
- Directed by: Park Beom-soo
- Written by: Park Beom-soo
- Produced by: Eom Ju-yeong; Lee Yong-ho
- Starring: Yoon Kye-sang; Go Joon-hee
- Cinematography: Kim Young-min
- Edited by: Shin Min-kyung
- Music by: Lee Ji-soo
- Production company: Noori Pictures
- Distributed by: Prain Global
- Release date: October 23, 2014
- Running time: 118 minutes
- Country: South Korea
- Language: Korean

Red Carpet (Korean: 레드카펫) is a 2014 South Korean romantic comedy film written and directed by Park Beom-soo, loosely inspired by his experience as a pornographic director.

== Plot ==
Jung-woo (Yoon Kye-sang) is a film director of adult films. He entered the film industry because of his love for cinema, but found himself stuck doing erotic movies for 10 years. His bed ridden father (Myung Gye-nam) is noticeably dissatisfied with his career decision.

Eun-soo (Go Joon-hee) is a former child actress that recently moved back to Korea to pursue a career in acting. Having fallen for a fake rental listing of Jung-woo's apartment, she is forced to room with him until her affairs are sorted. She later realizes that Jung-woo is a screenwriter when she finds the screenplay for his dream project, "An Officer and A Nurse". When Eun-soo accidentally shows up at a porn open casting at Jung-woo's office, not knowing his true profession, he makes it up to her by helping her find actual open cast calls and practicing her monologues. And as they spend more time together, they start to develop feelings for each other.

After getting the role, Eun-soo decides to gift Jung-woo a projector for helping her. But as she arrives home, she finds the steamed silhouette of woman by the front door, making illicit noises. Unbeknownst to her, Jung-woo had actually brought the porn crew back home for reshoots due to budget restraints. But having felt cheated, Eun-soo suddenly disappears from Jung-woo's life.

Jung-woo later sulks in a bar, wondering what has gone wrong, the scenery changing around him as time goes by, revealing Eun-soo's growth in popularity and her new found stardom.

Jung-woo and his crew finally find the courage to quit their porn gig to pursue the production "An Officer and A Nurse" together. Eun-soo and Jung-woo reconcile over the misunderstanding and they come together to work on the project. However, paparazzi soon find out that the famed actress is seen on set with the former pornographic director. To avoid ruining Eun-soo's image, Jung-woo hosts a press conference and denounces any relationship between them, but he refuses to denounce any of the work he's made before. Moved by the press conference, Jung-woo's father gives him his blessing to pursue his dream.

Their film finally makes it onto the film festival circuit and lands a spot in a small community film festival in Busan, the same day Eun-soo's new film is premiering. When Jung-woo's assistant director (Lee Chan-hee) shows up with an invitation, Eun-soo rushes out to make the screening, with the media trailing behind. When she makes it to the film festival, Jung-woo confesses his love for her and they embrace.

The film ends with "An Officer and A Nurse" getting accepted into major film festivals and the crew later finding success in the mainstream film industry and abroad.

== Cast ==
- Yoon Kye-sang as Park Jung-woo
- Go Joon-hee as Jung Eun-soo
- Oh Jung-se as Jo Jin-hwan
- Jo Dal-hwan as Kang Joon-soo
- Hwang Chan-sung as Kim Dae-yoon
- Shin Ji-soo as Strawberry
- Son Byung-wook as Seok-bong
- Lee Mi-do as Sunny
- Ahn Jae-hong as Windmill
- Im Eun-ji as Plum
- Lee Chan-hee as Assistant director
- Lee Tae-hyeong as Department head Lee
- Nam Yeon-woo as Chang-soo
- Yang Seon-hye as Cherry
- Jeon Shin-hye as Yeo-reum
- Lee Ye-ryeong as Watermelon
- Lee Gwang-hoon as Mango
- Kim Jae-young as Tsunami
- Kim Ja-young as Jung-woo's mother
- Kim Hyun-jeong as Seok-bong's wife
- Seo Ha-jin as Seok-bong's daughter
- Kim Jae-cheol as Constable Kim
- Yoon Da-kyung as Representative Oh (cameo)
- Song Sam-dong as Man with sign (cameo)
- Min Seong-wook as Kang Hyun-min (cameo)
- Sung Ji-ru as CEO (cameo)
- Myung Gye-nam as Jung-woo's father (cameo)
- Seon Hak as Awards ceremony host (cameo)
