= Over My Dead Body (2012 South Korean film) =

- Promotional poster for Over My Dead Body
- Hangul: 시체가 돌아왔다
- Hanja: 屍體가 돌아왔다
- RR: Sichega dorawatda
- MR: Sich'ega torawatta
- Directed by: Woo Seon-ho
- Written by: Woo Seon-ho
- Produced by: Lee Choon-yeon
- Starring: Lee Beom-soo; Ryoo Seung-bum; Kim Ok-vin
- Cinematography: Jo Sang-yoon
- Edited by: Park Kyung-sook
- Music by: Yoon Joon-ho
- Production company: Cine 2000
- Distributed by: CJ E&M
- Release date: 29 March 2012
- Running time: 110 minutes
- Country: South Korea
- Language: Korean
- Budget: US$2.6 million
- Box office: US$6.4 million

Over My Dead Body (Korean: 시체가 돌아왔다; RR: Sichega dorawatda; lit. 'Return of the Corpse') is a 2012 South Korean comic heist film, starring Lee Beom-soo, Ryoo Seung-bum and Kim Ok-vin. The plot centers on a biotech researcher, a woman whose father was murdered, and a man attempting to commit insurance fraud whose lives get tied up in the case of a stolen semiconductor chip and a missing corpse. Released on March 29, 2012, the film sold 985,178 tickets in total.

== Plot ==
Baek Hyun-chul (Lee Beom-soo) is a biotech scientist researching the cure for skin cancer. Deciding to shut the lab and sell Hyun-chul's work overseas, the head of the pharmaceutical conglomerate, Kim Taek-soo, sends Steve Jung and his gang to force the lab to shut down and take the research. Hyun-chul's colleague Han Jin-soo protests the decision, and is later involved in a hit-and-run accident and falls into a vegetative state.

Taek-soo is also betrayed and murdered by Steve, little knowing the research is on a microchip planted inside his body. Driven by vengeance, Hyun-chul and Jin-soo's pink-haired daughter Dong-hwa (Kim Ok-vin) plot to steal Taek-soo's body to pay for Jin-soo's hospital bills. However the body they escape from the morgue with isn't Taek-soo's but that of Ahn Jin-oh (Ryoo Seung-bum), a man who faked his death in order to hide from loan sharks. Believing Taek-soo's body has been stolen, Steve and his gang begin a hunt for Hyun-chul and Dong-hwa to recover the precious microchip.

== Cast ==
- Lee Beom-soo as Baek Hyun-chul
- Ryoo Seung-bum as Ahn Jin-oh
- Kim Ok-vin as Han Dong-hwa
- Yoo Da-in as NIS agent Jang Ha-yeon
- Jung Man-sik as Steve Jung
- Shin Jung-geun as Team leader Jo
- Go Chang-seok as Sung-koo
- Oh Jung-se as Myung-kwan
- Bae Jeong-nam as Jong-moo
- Jung In-gi as Han Jin-soo

== Production ==
When director Woo Seon-ho was at his maternal grandfather's funeral, he wondered what would happen if his grandfather's dead body suddenly disappeared. This unusual and dark thought inspired his debut feature film, Over My Dead Body. He had previously won the comedy award at the 4th Mise-en-scène Short Film Festival for My Really Big Mike.

Over My Dead Body has elements of social satire and black comedy as well as character comedy. At the core of the comedy is various unexpected situations as different characters come together. There are also chase scenes shot around Banpo Bridge and the surrounding high-rise apartment blocks.
