= Untouchable (South Korean TV series) =

2017 South Korean television series

- Promotional poster
- Hangul: 언터처블
- RR: Eonteocheobeul
- MR: Ŏnt'ŏch'ŏbŭl
- Genre: Action; Thriller; Mystery; Melodrama
- Created by: JTBC
- Written by: Choi Jin-won
- Directed by: Jo Nam-kook
- Starring: Jin Goo; Kim Sung-kyun; Jung Eun-ji; Go Joon-hee
- Country of origin: South Korea
- Original language: Korean
- No. of episodes: 16

Production
- Executive producers: Park Joon-seo; Son Gi-won
- Production companies: Drama House; Kim Jong-hak Production

Original release
- Network: JTBC
- Release: November 24, 2017 – January 20, 2018

Untouchable (Korean: 언터처블) is a 2017 South Korean television series starring Jin Goo, Kim Sung-kyun, Jung Eun-ji and Go Joon-hee. It aired on JTBC from November 24, 2017 to January 20, 2018, every Friday and Saturday at 23:00 (KST) for 16 episodes.

== Synopsis ==
Untouchable is the story of power games and hidden secrets of the Jang family who has ruled the city of Bukcheon for three generations.

== Cast ==
=== Main ===
- Jin Goo as Jang Joon-seo, a detective squad chief and the second son of Jang clan who chases after the truth behind the death of his wife.
- Kim Sung-kyun as Jang Ki-seo, Joon-seo's older brother who turns corrupt like his father in order to survive.
- Jung Eun-ji as Seo Yi-ra, a prosecutor.
- Go Joon-hee as Goo Ja-kyung, Ki-seo's wife who is the only daughter of a former president.

=== Supporting ===
==== Jang family ====
- Park Geun-hyung as Jang Beom-ho
- Choi Jong-won as Goo Yong-chan
- Son Jong-hak as Jang Beom-sik
- Lee Jae-won as Jang Gyu-ho
- Shin Jung-geun as Yong Hak-soo
- Ye Soo-jung as Park Young-sook

==== Police department ====
- Jin Kyung as Jung Yoon-mi
- Park Won-sang as Go Soo-chang
- Bae Yoo-ram as Choi Jae-ho
- Lim Hyun-sung as Lee Sung-kyun
- Park Ji-hwan as Goo Do-su

=== Others ===
- Kyung Soo-jin as Yoon Jung-hye
- Ji Yoon-ha as Yoo Na-na
- Kim Ji-hoon as Jo Taek-sang
- Jo Jae-ryong as Joo Tae-seob

== Production ==
- The series is set in a fictional city called Bukcheon.
- The first script reading of the cast was held on August 17, 2017 at JTBC building in Sangam-dong.

== Viewership ==
Untouchable : South Korea viewers per episode (thousands)

Season	Episode number															
Season	1	2	3	4	5	6	7	8	9	10	11	12	13	14	15	16
1	N/A	N/A	N/A	N/A	N/A	N/A	N/A	N/A	N/A	N/A	495	595	N/A	547	N/A	711

Source: Audience measurement performed nationwide by Nielsen Korea. (Note: The number of viewers was released on Nielsen Korea starting January 2018.)

Average TV viewership ratings
Ep.	Original broadcast date	Average audience share		
Ep.	Original broadcast date	Nielsen Korea		TNmS
Ep.	Original broadcast date	Nationwide	Seoul	Nationwide
1	November 24, 2017	2.300%	N/A	2.3%
2	November 25, 2017	3.324%	3.324%	2.8%
3	December 1, 2017	2.314%	N/A	2.1%
4	December 2, 2017	3.375%	4.269%	3.0%
5	December 8, 2017	2.400%	2.726%	1.9%
6	December 9, 2017	3.982%	4.293%	3.0%
7	December 15, 2017	2.564%	2.742%	1.7%
8	December 16, 2017	3.373%	3.519%	3.1%
9	December 22, 2017	3.043%	3.264%	2.3%
10	December 23, 2017	3.785%	3.759%	1.9%
11	January 5, 2018	2.441%	N/A	2.2%
12	January 6, 2018	2.607%	2.501%	3.1%
13	January 12, 2018	2.185%	N/A	1.9%
14	January 13, 2018	2.790%	N/A	2.6%
15	January 19, 2018	2.226%	N/A	2.1%
16	January 20, 2018	3.288%	2.995%	2.8%
Average		2.875%	— (Note: Due to some unpublished ratings, the exact average rating is unknown.)	2.425%
In the table above, the blue numbers represent the lowest ratings and the red numbers represent the highest ratings.; N/A denotes that the rating is not known.; This series aired on a cable channel/pay TV which normally has a relatively smaller audience compared to free-to-air TV/public broadcasters (KBS, SBS, MBC and EBS).
