= Go Joon-hee =

South Korean actress (born 1985)

Go Joon-hee 고준희
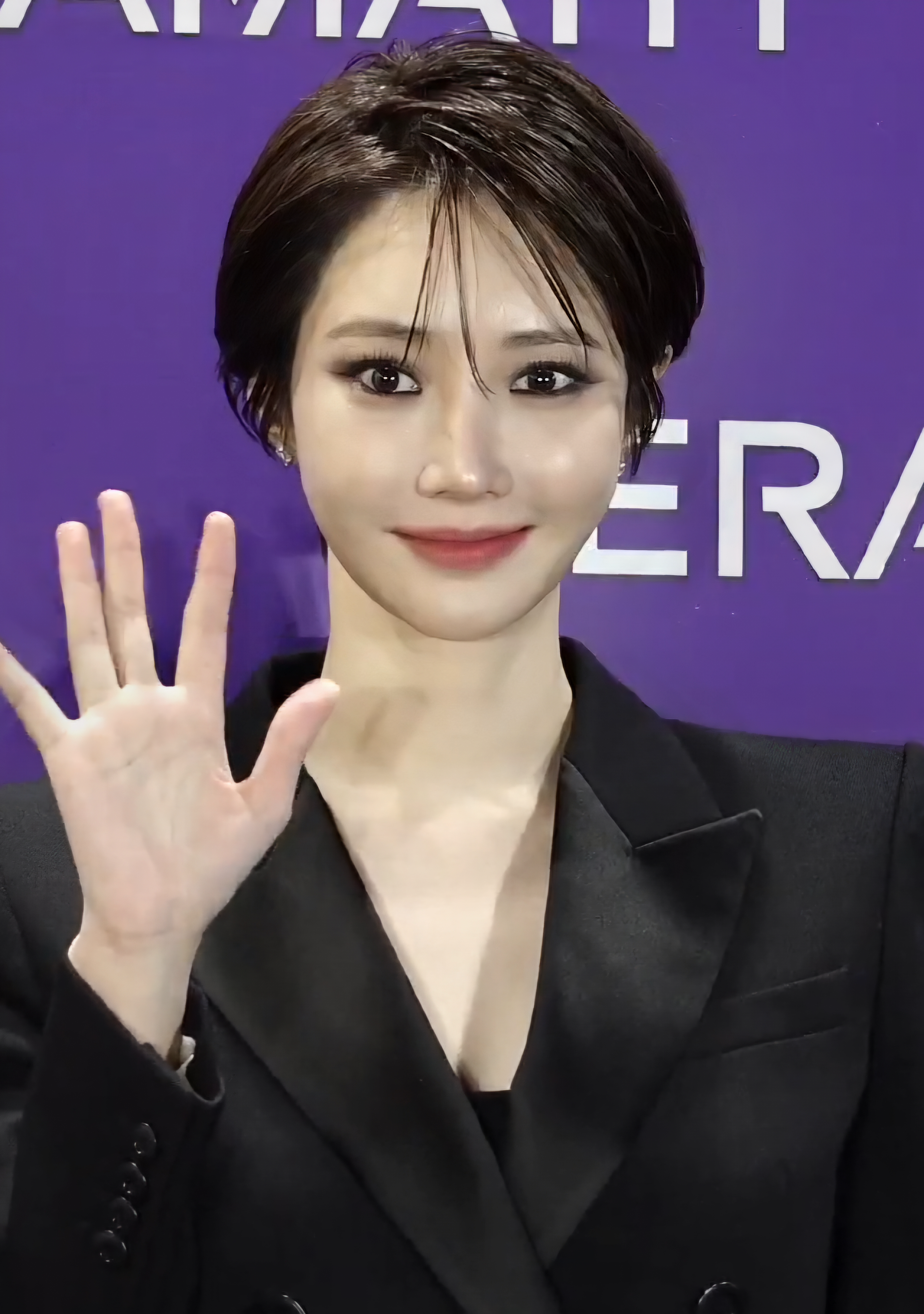
- Go in November 2024
- Born: Kim Eun-joo; 31 August 1985 (age 41); Seoul, South Korea
- Education: Kyung Hee University – Department of Theatre and Film
- Occupation: Actress
- Years active: 2003–present
- Agent: Y-Bloom

Korean name
- Hangul: 김은주
- RR: Gim Eunju
- MR: Kim Ŭnju

Stage name
- Hangul: 고준희
- Hanja: 高濬熙
- RR: Go Junhui
- MR: Ko Chunhŭi

Go Joon-hee (Korean: 고준희; born August 31, 1985), birth name Kim Eun-joo, is a South Korean actress. She made her entertainment debut as a school uniform model in 2001, then launched an acting career in 2003.

== Background ==
Kim adopted the stage name Go Joon-hee in 2008, after her character's name in What's Up Fox (2006).

== Career ==
After playing supporting roles in Girl Scout (2008) and Architecture 101 (2012), she was cast as a lead actress in the 2011 indies Drifting Away and Yeosu, the mainstream romantic comedies Marriage Blue (2013) and Red Carpet (2014), and the heist film Intimate Enemies (2015).

Go has also appeared in several television dramas, notably Listen to My Heart (2011), The Chaser (2012), and King of Ambition (2013). In 2013, she joined the fourth season of dating reality show We Got Married opposite Jinwoon of boyband 2AM.

In 2015, Go starred in the hit romantic comedy series She Was Pretty.

In February 2017, Go signed with YG Entertainment. The same year, she starred in action melodrama Untouchable.

In 2019, Go starred in OCN's supernatural thriller Possessed.

In June 2019, Go signed with new agency C-JeS Studios.

In March 2022, Go did not renew her contract with GLO Entertainment. Later in May, Go signed a contract with Y-Bloom.

== Filmography ==
=== Film ===
| Year | Title | Role | Ref. |
|---|---|---|---|
| 2007 | Hansel and Gretel | Hae-young | |
| 2008 | Girl Scout | Kang Eun-ji | |
| 2011 | Drifting Away | Dan-bi | |
| 2011 | Yeosu | Mi-jin | |
| 2012 | Doomsday Book | Kim Yoo-min ("A Brave New World"); Weather girl ("Happy Birthday") | |
| 2012 | Architecture 101 | Eun-chae | |
| 2013 | Marriage Blue | Yi-ra | |
| 2014 | Red Carpet | Jung Eun-soo | |
| 2015 | Intimate Enemies | Na-mi | |

=== Television series ===
| Year | Title | Role | Network | Ref. |
|---|---|---|---|---|
| 2003 | Breathless | Jo Young-ji | MBC | |
| 2005 | Hello My Teacher | Kim Sun-ah | SBS | |
| 2006 | Dasepo Naughty Girl | Girl with Poverty on her back | Super Action | |
| 2006 | MBC Best Theater: "That Guy" | Lee Hyun-joo | MBC | |
| 2006 | What's Up Fox | Go Joon-hee | MBC | |
| 2007 | Crazy in Love | Jo Min-hee | SBS | |
| 2008 | Robber | Young-sook (cameo, episode 1) | SBS | |
| 2008 | General Hospital 2 | Kang Eun-ji | MBC | |
| 2010 | The Slave Hunters | Je-ni | KBS2 | |
| 2011 | Listen to My Heart | Kang Min-soo | MBC | |
| 2012 | 12 Signs of Love | Park Tan-ya | tvN | |
| 2012 | The Chaser | Seo Ji-won | SBS | |
| 2013 | King of Ambition | Seok Soo-jung | SBS | |
| 2015 | She Was Pretty | Min Ha-ri | MBC | |
| 2017 | Untouchable | Goo Ja-kyung | JTBC | |
| 2019 | Possessed | Hong Seo-jung | OCN | |

=== Variety shows ===
| Year | Title | Notes |
|---|---|---|
| 2005 | X-Man: Pattaya Special | Cast member |
| 2008 | Interview Game | Host |
| 2010 | Fox's Butler | Cast member |
| 2011 | Style Magazine | Host |
| 2013 | We Got Married Season 4 | Cast member; paired with Jeong Jinwoon |

=== Music video appearances ===
| Year | Song title | Artist |
|---|---|---|
| 2004 | "Don't Know Why" | SG Wannabe |
| 2005 | "The One Who Is Listening to My Song" | Park Shin-yang |
| 2005 | "The Lover" | Park Shin-yang |
| 2005 | "Scattered Days" | Park Hyo-shin |
| 2006 | "Shirin (It's Cold)" | Lee Soo-young |
| 2011 | "Like Rain, Like Music" | Joo Jin-mo |

== Awards and nominations ==
| Year | Award | Category | Nominated work | Result | Ref. |
|---|---|---|---|---|---|
| 2001 | SK Smart Uniform Model Contest | 1st Place | —N/a | Won | |
| 2002 | Yeshin Persons Model Contest | Grand Prize | —N/a | Won | |
| 2003 | Binggrae Model Contest | Miss Binggrae | —N/a | Won | |
| 2006 | 25th MBC Drama Awards | Best New Actress | What's Up Fox? | Nominated | |
| 2012 | 5th Style Icon Awards | Fashion Icon | —N/a | Won | |
| 2012 | 6th Mnet 20's Choice Awards | 20's Style | —N/a | Nominated | |
| 2012 | 20th Korean Culture and Entertainment Awards | Popularity Award, Actress in a Drama | The Chaser | Won | |
| 2012 | 20th SBS Drama Awards | New Star Award | The Chaser | Won | |
| 2013 | 2nd APAN Star Awards | Acting Award, Actress | King of Ambition | Nominated | |
| 2013 | 28th Korea Best Dresser Swan Awards | Best Dressed, Actress category | —N/a | Won | |
| 2014 | 1st S-Oil Best Model Awards | Gold Actor Sector | —N/a | Won | |
| 2015 | 1st Fashionista Awards | Best Fashionista – Female Category | —N/a | Nominated | |
| 2015 | 1st Fashionista Awards | Best Fashionista – Hair Style Sector | —N/a | Nominated | |
| 2015 | 1st Fashionista Awards | Best Fashionista – TV Category | She Was Pretty | Nominated | |
| 2015 | 34th MBC Drama Awards | Excellence Award, Actress in a Miniseries | She Was Pretty | Nominated | |
| 2015 | 34th MBC Drama Awards | Popularity Award, Actress | She Was Pretty | Nominated | |
| 2016 | InStyle Star Icon | Most Stylish Female Actress | —N/a | Nominated | |
| 2016 | 8th Style Icon Awards | Style Icon | —N/a | Nominated | |
