= Possessed (TV series) =

2019 South Korean television series

- Promotional poster
- Hangul: 빙의
- Lit.: Possession
- RR: Bingui
- MR: Pingŭi
- Genre: Comedy; Supernatural; Thriller
- Created by: Studio Dragon
- Written by: Park Hee-kang
- Directed by: Choi Do-hoon
- Starring: Song Sae-byeok; Go Joon-hee; Yeon Jung-hoon; Jo Han-sun
- Country of origin: South Korea
- Original language: Korean
- No. of seasons: One
- No. of episodes: 16

Production
- Producer: Song Jung-woo
- Camera setup: Single-camera
- Running time: 60 minutes
- Production company: Daydream Entertainment

Original release
- Network: OCN
- Release: March 6 – April 25, 2019

Possessed (Korean: 빙의; RR: Bingui) is a 2019 South Korean television series starring Song Sae-byeok, Go Joon-hee, Yeon Jung-hoon and Jo Han-sun. It aired on OCN's Wednesdays and Thursdays at 23:00 KST from March 6 to April 25, 2019.

== Synopsis ==
Detective Kang Pil-sung and psychic medium Hong Seo-jung join forces to get rid of the ghost of a murderer who was executed 20 years ago.

== Cast ==
=== Main ===
- Song Sae-byeok as Kang Pil-sung

A police detective who was abandoned by his family and is trying to unlock the secrets of his newly found powers of seeing ghosts.

- Go Joon-hee as Hong Seo-jung

A woman who can see ghosts, read people's minds, and control people, plus has some knowledge about spirits. She has never met her mother, having been abandoned by her at a young age.

- Yeon Jung-hoon as Oh Soo-hyeok

The new body that Hwang Dae-du possesses. He is a wealthy businessman and is the CEO of TF Group. When possessed, he could control a drug that can turn people into a zombie-like creature.

- Jo Han-sun as Seon Yang-woo

A follower of the serial killer Hwang Dae-du who briefly inhibits his spirit. He is a surgeon at Hanul Medical Center. He is killed after he is shot multiple times by policemen.

=== Supporting ===
==== Twenty years ago ====
- Jang Hyuk-jin as Kim Nak-chun

A former police officer and veteran detective who lost his partner and is killed by Seon Yang-woo. He arrested Hwang Dae-du. He wages constant battle with Hwang Dae-du and will do anything to stop him from getting power.

- Seo Eun-woo as Kim Ji-hang

Detective Kim Nak-chun's daughter

- Won Hyun-joon as Hwang Dae-du

A serial killer responsible for 30 murders over 5 years. He is a spirit, having been executed 20 years ago, but seeks to gain power to restore his body.

==== At Sangdong Police Station ====
- Lee Won-jong as Detective Squad Chief Yoo

The chief of police who acts as a Guardian to Kang Pil-sung. He is a tough but soft officer who tries to help his comrades. He is killed when he is shot but goes into Pil-sung to instruct him what to do.

- Park Jin-woo as Choi Nam-hyun

A police officer who is Kim Joon-hyung's boss. He gets discouraged easily.

- Kwon Hyuk-hyun as Kim Joon-hyung

A new recruit who is Choi Nam-hyun's partner. The youngest detective.

- Ahn Eun-jin as Choi Yeon-hee

A cute and lovable traffic cop who retains her youthful appearance.

- Jeong Chan-bi as Yoo Seung-hee

Detective Yoo's daughter.

==== People around Seo-jung ====
- Gil Hae-yeon as Geum-jo

Seo-jung's mother, she is a worshipper who was killed by Seon Yang-woo. Her spirit is then killed by Hwang Dae-du. She had the power of summoning spirits but unlike her daughter, she can cast spells.

- Jo Won-ki as Bae Do-ryeong

A playful shaman who enjoys dating pretty women who comes to him for fortune telling.

- Lee Ji-hae as Cho Seung-kyung

Seo-jung's landlady and sports dance instructor. She is in love with Bae Do-ryeong.

==== People around Soo-hyeok ====
- Park Sang-min as Jang Choon-sub

Gangster boss who takes care of Oh Soo-hyeok's work and takes advantage of other people. Soo-hyeok's assistant who becomes the new Hwang Dae-du when his spirit enters his body. He was responsible for killing Pil-sung's mother and his assistant.

==== Others ====
- Jeong Hae-na as Sohee

Seo-jung's best friend and owner of a clothing store.

- Kim Yeon-jin
- Woo Seon-yool
- Lee Jung-min
- Park Soo-yeon
- Gi Se-hyeong as Chun-seop's subordinate
- Oh Yu-jin as Mi-seon

Female employee at Hanul Medical Center.

- Ryu Hye-rin as Hye-rin
- Kwak Myung-hwa
- Oh Jae-kyun
- Shin Woo-hee
- Lee Sang-in
- Lee Chae-bin
- Gong Jeong-hwan
- Kwon Yong-sik
- Shim So-young as So-young
- Jang Myung-woon
- Baek Jae-woo
- Park Sung-yeon as Ji-sook
- Cho Wan-gi

==== Cameos ====
- Jung Han-yong as the director of Hanul Medical Center
- Jang Hyun-sung as the doctor who treats Detective Chief Squad Yoo
- Park Soon-chun as the director nun
- Lee Young-ah as Stephanie

== Original soundtrack ==
Possessed OST

Soundtrack album by Various artists
- Released: 2019
- Genre: Soundtrack
- Languages: Korean; English
- Labels: Star Entry Entertainment; Kakao M

=== Part 1 ===
Released on March 7, 2019
No.	Title	Artist	Length
1.	"Searching Me"	Sojung (Ladies' Code)	3:42
2.	"Searching Me" (Inst.)		3:42
Total length:			7:24

=== Part 2 ===
Released on March 15, 2019
No.	Title	Artist	Length
1.	"What a Meaning" (어떤 의미)	The Barberettes	3:37
2.	"What a Meaning" (Inst.)		3:37
Total length:			7:14

=== Part 3 ===
Released on March 21, 2019
No.	Title	Artist	Length
1.	"Hold My Hand" (잡아줘)	Lee Ba-da	3:51
2.	"Hold My Hand" (Inst.)		3:51
Total length:			7:42

=== Part 4 ===
Released on March 28, 2019
No.	Title	Artist	Length
1.	"Like That Day" (그날처럼)	Han Hee-jun	3:47
2.	"Like That Day" (Inst.)		3:47
Total length:			7:34

=== Part 5 ===
Released on April 4, 2019
No.	Title	Artist	Length
1.	"Fly" (날아)	Na Go-eun (Purple Kiss)	3:29
2.	"Fly" (Inst.)		3:29
Total length:			6:58

=== Part 6 ===
Released on April 11, 2019
No.	Title	Artist	Length
1.	"I'll Be There"	Han Seung-hee	3:50
2.	"I'll Be There" (Inst.)		3:50
Total length:			7:40

=== Part 7 ===
Released on April 18, 2019
No.	Title	Artist	Length
1.	"When I Find You" (잊지마...)	Yun Kyu-sung	3:42
2.	"When I Find You" (Inst.)		3:42
Total length:			7:24

=== Part 8 ===
Released on April 19, 2019
No.	Title	Artist	Length
1.	"I Find You"	Seven O'Clock	3:28
2.	"I Find You" (Inst.)		3:28
Total length:			6:56

=== Part 9 ===
Released on April 24, 2019
No.	Title	Artist	Length
1.	"Lunar Rainbow" (달무지개)	Jin-joo	3:41
2.	"Lunar Rainbow" (Inst.)		3:41
3.	"Cau Vong Anh Trang"	Jin-joo	3:41
Total length:			11:03

== Ratings ==
In this table, the blue numbers represent the lowest ratings and the red numbers represent the highest ratings.

Ep.	Original broadcast date	Average audience share	
Ep.	Original broadcast date	AGB Nielsen	
Ep.	Original broadcast date	Nationwide	Seoul
1	March 6, 2019	1.558%	1.785%
2	March 7, 2019	2.650%	3.694%
3	March 13, 2019	2.190%	2.721%
4	March 14, 2019	2.263%	3.154%
5	March 20, 2019	2.135%	2.624%
6	March 21, 2019	2.312%	2.902%
7	March 27, 2019	1.906%	2.531%
8	March 28, 2019	1.966%	2.536%
9	April 3, 2019	1.880%	2.425%
10	April 4, 2019	1.676%	2.054%
11	April 10, 2019	1.565%	2.052%
12	April 11, 2019	1.621%	2.272%
13	April 17, 2019	1.466%	1.919%
14	April 18, 2019	1.488%	1.884%
15	April 24, 2019	1.402%	1.842%
16	April 25, 2019	1.858%	2.195%
Average		1.871%	2.412%

- This drama airs on a cable channel/pay TV which normally has a relatively smaller audience compared to free-to-air TV/public broadcasters (KBS, SBS, MBC and EBS).
