= Kang Boo-ja =

South Korean actress (born 1941)

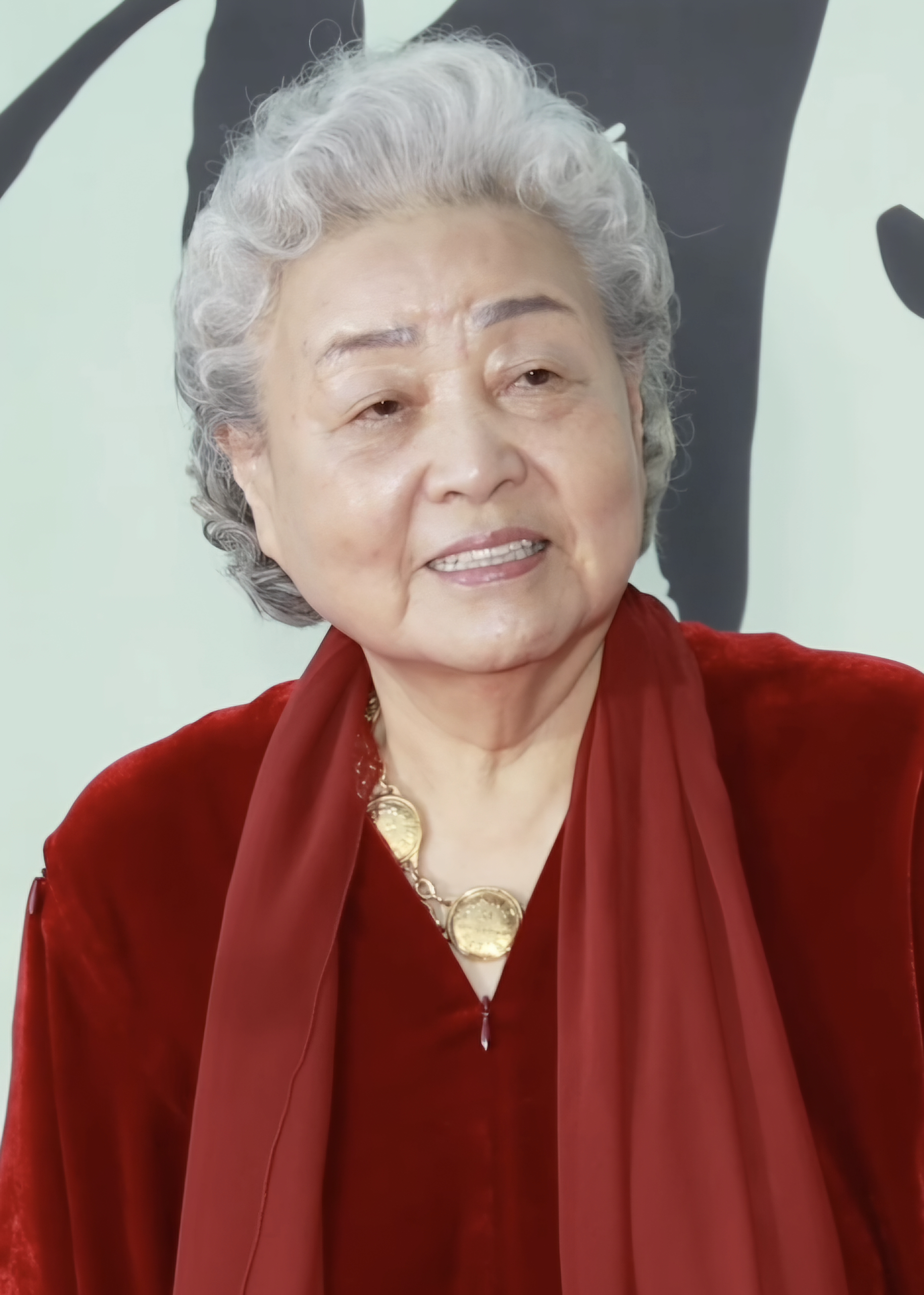
- Kang in October 2024
- Born: February 8, 1941 (age 85); Nonsan, Chūseinan Province, Korea, Empire of Japan
- Occupation: Actress
- Years active: 1962–present
- Spouse: Lee Muk-won (m. 1967)

Korean name
- Hangul: 강부자
- Hanja: 姜富子
- RR: Gang Buja
- MR: Kang Puja

Kang Boo-ja (Korean: 강부자; born February 8, 1941) is a South Korean actress. Kang was studying Korean Language and Literature at Chungnam National University when she dropped out to pursue acting. She made her acting debut in 1962 and has been active on Korean stage, television and film for more than five decades.

She took a non-degree National Policy Course at Seoul National University's Graduate School of Public Administration, and entered politics in 1992. Kang was elected as a lawmaker in the 14th National Assembly.

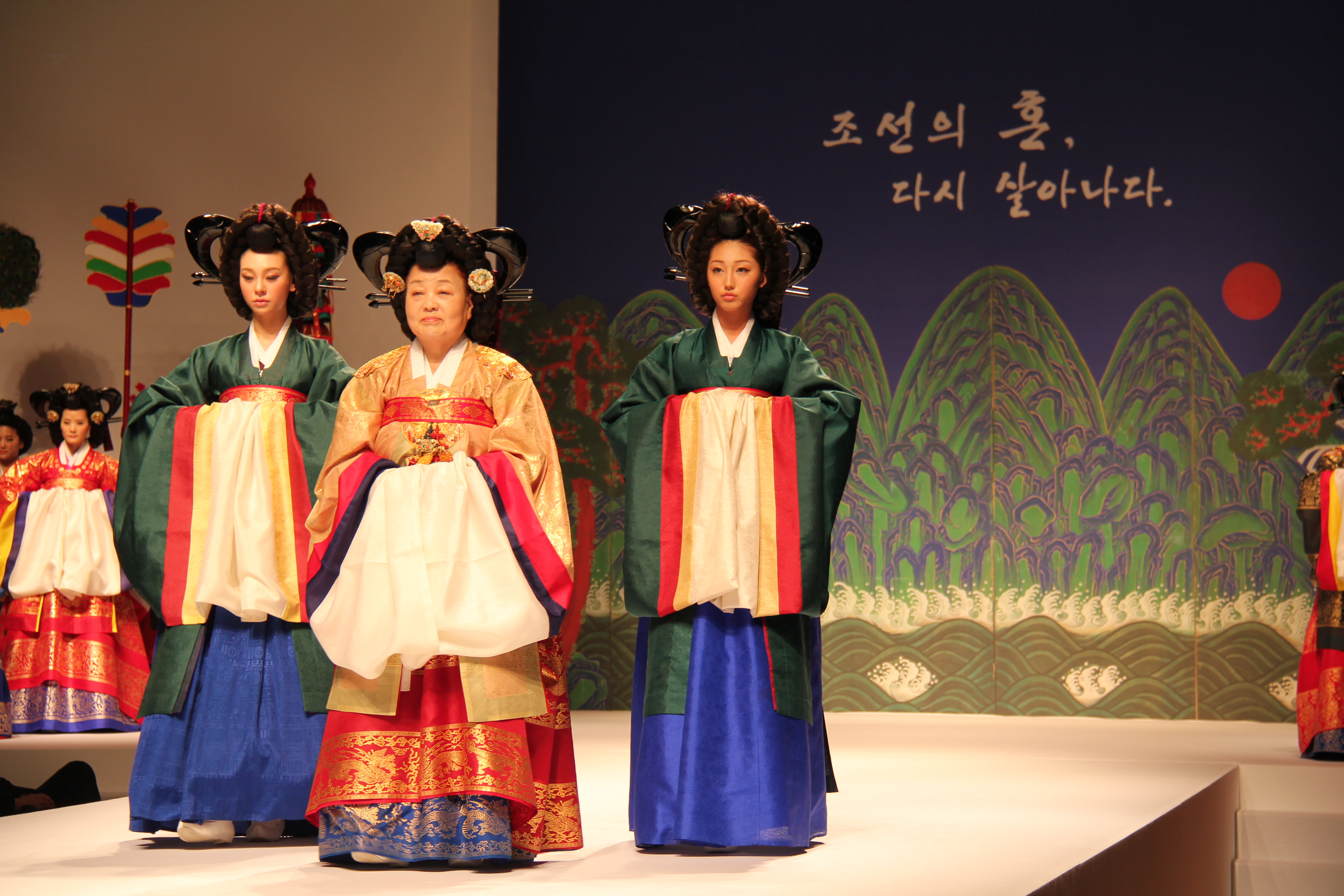
Kang part of the reenactment of the royal wedding at the National Museum of Korea in 2012

== Filmography ==
=== Television series ===
Year	Title	Role	Notes/Ref.
1962	Sole and Twist		
1964	Family Romance		
1965	Hanyang Nanggun		
1965	Jung-kyung's Wife		
1966	The Second Wife		
1966	Live As I Please		
1966	Today's King		
1967	The Swish of a Skirt		
1969	I Guess the Marriage Line is Blocked		
1969	Damo Gidam	Peng Soon-deok	
1970	Lonely Road		
1970	Ok-nyeo		
1970	Ajumma		
1970	Ahohji		
1970	Two Men		
1970	Pigeon Family		
1970	Noona (Older Sister)		
1970	I Had a Good Dream	Mrs. Shim	
1971	Thrifty Mrs. Dureung		
1971	With Such a Wife		
1971	You Are Weak		
1971	Tale of the Yangban		
1972	Evergreen Tree		
1972	Only Son		
1972	Secret		
1972	Samryong the Mute		
1973	Yeobojeong Seondal		
1973	Yeon-hwa	Min Tae-ho's wife	
1974	Queen Inmok		
1974	Yoon Ji-kyung		
1975	Two Husbands		
1975	Detective		
1975	Two Siblings		
1976	Byeoldang Lady		
1976	Wedding March		
1977	Door of Happiness		
1977	Blue Thread, Red Thread		
1978	Kanna's Garden		
1978	Covenant		
1978	Thousand Year Old Lake		
1978	Mother's River		
1979	Hey Gomrye		
1979	Grand Tale of Chunhyang		
1979	Couples: Unconditional Love	Park In-sook	
1980	Uinyeo Misa		
1980	Daldongne		
1980	Glow		
1980	Candle		
1981	Maecheon Yarok (Memoirs of a Thousand Events)		
1981	Hwangnyongsa		
1981	Promised Land		
1982	Bukcheong Muljangsu		
1983	Sanyuhwa		
1983	Baek-jo's Wife	Seo Jin-sook	
1984	I Like My Daughter Better		
1984	TV Tale of Chunhyang	Hyangdan	
1985	Hometown		
1986	You're Right	Elder Song's wife	
1987	Yearning Song		
1987	Stranger	Mrs. Kim	
1988	Sand Castle	Jang Young-joo	
1988	500 Years of Joseon: Memoirs of Lady Hyegyŏng	Queen Inwon	
1989	Half a Failure	Mother	
1989	Hurt		
1990	Copper Ring		
1990	Betrayal of the Rose	Lee Eun-soo	
1990	Ambitious Times	Lady Ahn, Hyung-sub's mother	
1990	My Mother		
1991	What Is Love	Sung-sook	
1992	Thorn Flower		
1992	The Chemistry Is Right	Ahn Eung-seok's mother	
1993	Our Hot Song	Mrs. Park	
1993	Wandering Soul		
1994	The Lonely Man	Jang Soon-ja	
1995	Men of the Bath House	Lee Ki-ja	
1996	Temptation		
1997	Hometown of Legends "Servant's Smile"	Nanny	one act-drama
1997	Because I Really	Lee Ok-bong	
1997	Sea of Ambition	Ms. Jo	
1998	I Love You, I Love You		
1998	My Love by My Side	Do Ok-sun	
1998	Crush		
1999	Love in 3 Colors	Park Ok-nam	
1999	Sweet Bride	Chun Jung-soon	
2000	Fireworks	Madam Noh	
2000	Juliet's Man	Baek Boo-ja	
2001	Twins		
2001	Way of Living: Couple	Shim Ok-joo	
2001	This Is Love	Na Eum-jeon	
2002	Royal Story: Jang Hui-bin	Queen Jangnyeol	
2003	Dal-joong's Cinderella	Bok-hee	
2003	Yellow Handkerchief	Yoon Ja-young's maternal grandmother	
2003	Like a Flowing River	Young-wook's grandmother	
2003	Cats on the Roof	Lee Kyung-hee	
2003	Garden of Eve	Ms. Song	
2003	Perfect Love	Jang Hye-ja	
2004	My Lovely Family	Lee Jeom-soon	
2004	Choice	Park Ok-ran	
2005	A Farewell to Sorrow	Hwang Keum-sil	
2005	Our Stance on How to Treat a Break-up	Madam Ok Geum-joo	
2005	Hanoi Bride	Park Eun-woo's mother	
2006	I'll Go with You	Ms. Park	
2007	A Happy Woman	Son Young-soon	
2007	Salt Doll	Ms. Lee, Park Yeon-woo's mother	
2007	When Spring Comes	Hometown restaurant granny	
2007	Thank You	Kang Gook-ja	
2008	Mom's Dead Upset	Na I-seok	
2008	Don't Cry My Love	Im Young-soon	
2009	Good Job, Good Job	Yoon Ok-rae	
2009	Three Men	Jung Woong-in's mother	
2011	Indomitable Daughters-in-Law	Choi Mak-nyeo	
2011	Can't Lose		guest appearance
2012	My Husband Got a Family	Jeon Mak-rye	
2013	Thrice Married Woman	Son Bosal	
2014	My Spring Days	Na Hyun-soon	
2016	Yeah, That's How It Is	Kim Sook-ja	
2018	A Pledge to God	Lee Pil-nam	
2023	The Real Has Come!	Eun Geum-sil	

=== Film ===
Year	Title	Role
1996	Let Me Just Touch	
1967	One-sided Love of Princess	
1967	A Full Danger	
1967	Three Swordsmen of Iljimae	
1967	Soil	
1969	Rang	
1969	March of a Wife	
1969	Husband	
1969	Darling	
1969	Winter Woman	
1969	Mrs. Wonnim	
1970	Gu Bong-seo's Marriage Plan	
1971	Sergeant Kim's Return from Vietnam	Mal-sook
1974	Yeonhwa	
1974	Yeonhwa 2	
1976	Mother	
1979	We Took the Night Train	
1983	Wife	
1991	Love and Tears	
2003	The Crescent Moon	Grandmother
2003	Ogu: Hilarious Mourning	Grandma Hwang

=== Variety/radio show ===
Year	Title	Notes/Ref.
1980–1992	Hello, This Is Hwang In-yong and Kang Boo-ja	DJ
1992	Morning Journal with Kang Boo-ja	DJ
1993	Environment Diary	DJ
1993	Towards the Equinox	Host
1997	Hello, This Is Kang Boo-ja and Kang Seok-woo	DJ
2023	Around the Neighborhood	Narrator

== Theater ==
Year	Title	Role	Reprised
1997	Ogu	Grandma Hwang	2008, 2010, 2014
2009	3 Days and 2 Nights with Mom	Mom/Mrs. Choi	2010, 2011, 2012, 2013, 2014
2011	Sanbul (Forest Fire)	Ms. Yang	

== Awards and nominations ==
Year	Award	Category	Nominated work	Result
1971	TBC Drama Awards	Best Supporting Actress		Won
1973	1st Hwalran Broadcasting and Culture Awards		Only Son	Won
1977	13th Baeksang Arts Awards	Best Actress (TV)	Wedding March	Won
1979	TBC Drama Awards	Grand Prize (Daesang)		Won
1996	KBS Drama Awards	Grand Prize (Daesang)	Men of the Bath House	Won
1999	KBS Drama Awards	Achievement Award		Won
2008	2nd Korea Drama Awards	Achievement Award		Nominated
2009	5th Golden Ticket Awards	Best Actress in a Play	3 Days and 2 Nights with Mom	Won
2011	7th Golden Ticket Awards	Best Actress in a Play	3 Days and 2 Nights with Mom	Won
2011	MBC Drama Awards	Achievement Award	Indomitable Daughters-in-Law	Won
2012	8th Golden Ticket Awards	Best Actress in a Play	3 Days and 2 Nights with Mom	Won
2018	MBC Drama Awards	Golden Acting Award	A Pledge to God	Won

== Election results ==
=== General elections ===
Year	Elections	Constituency	Political party	Votes (%)	Results
1992	14th National Assembly General Election	National (8th)	UNP	3,574,419 (17.37%)	Not Elected→Elected
