= A Pledge to God =

South Korean television series

- Promotional poster
- Also known as: A Promise with the Gods
- Hangul: 신과의 약속
- Hanja: 神과의 約束
- RR: Singwaui yaksok
- MR: Sin'gwaŭi yaksok
- Genre: Melodrama; Family drama
- Written by: Hong Young-hee
- Directed by: Yoon Jae-moon
- Starring: Han Chae-young; Bae Soo-bin; Oh Yoon-ah; Lee Chun-hee
- Country of origin: South Korea
- Original language: Korean
- No. of episodes: 24 (Note: In order to circumvent Korean laws that prevent commercial breaks in the middle of an episode, what would previously have been aired as single 70 minute episodes are now being repackaged as two 35 minute episodes, with two episodes being shown each night with a commercial break between the two.)

Production
- Producers: Lee Myung-sook; Sohn Ok-hyun
- Running time: 35 minutes
- Production companies: Yein E&M

Original release
- Network: MBC TV
- Release: November 24, 2018 – February 16, 2019

A Pledge to God (Korean: 신과의 약속) is a South Korean television series starring Han Chae-young, Bae Soo-bin, Oh Yoon-ah and Lee Chun-hee. The series aired four episodes every Saturday on MBC TV from 20:45 to 23:10 (KST), from November 24, 2018 to February 16, 2019.

== Synopsis ==
Little Hyeon Woo is gravely ill and needs a bone marrow transplant. His current parents are not compatible donors. His doctor advises his parents that the cord blood of a sibling could be a potential donor. However, his birth parents are no longer married to each other.

== Cast ==
=== Main ===
- Han Chae-young as Seo Ji-young, a TV host
- Bae Soo-bin as Kim Jae-wook, formerly married to Ji-young, architect and later president & CEO of Cheonji Construction
- Oh Yoon-ah as Woo Na-kyung, second wife of Jae-wook, general counsel of Cheonji Construction
- Lee Chun-hee as Song Min-ho, second husband of Ji-young, carpenter

=== Supporting ===
==== Ji-young's family ====
- Wang Seok-hyeon as Song Hyeon-woo, eldest son of Ji-young and Jae-wook, in custody of Ji-young and Min-ho
  - Ha Yi-an as young Hyeon-woo
- Lee Hwi-hyang as Heo Eun-sook, Ji-young's mother

==== People at Cheonji Construction ====
- Park Geun-hyung as Kim Sang-chun, father of Jae-hee and Jae-wook, chairman of family-controlled Cheonji Construction
- Kang Boo-ja as Lee Pil-nam, Sang-chun's wife
- Oh Hyun-kyung as Kim Jae-hee, older sister of Jae-wook, heads the family company foundation
- Byung Hun as Jo Seung-hoon, son of Jae-hee
- Nam Ki-won as Kim Joon-seo, second son of Ji-young and Jae-wook, in custody of Jae-wook and Na-kyung
  - Kim Hyun-bin as young Joon-seo

==== Others ====
- Chu Ye-jin as Na Hae-ji, Hyeon Woo's girlfriend from high school
- Jung Min-sung as Ji Do-yeob
- Kim Hee-jung as Ahn Joo-ryun, producer of Ji-young's program at the TV broadcaster
- Bae Hae-sun as Oh Sun-joo, secretary to Na-kyung
- Choi Phillip as Jung Kyung-soo, director of Ji-young's program at the TV broadcaster
- Oh Eun-ho as Hwang Ma-ri
- Lee Jin-hee as Na Hae-Jim's mother.

== Production ==
The first script reading took place on October 5, 2018 at MBC Broadcasting Station in Sangam-dong, Seoul, South Korea.

== Original soundtrack ==
A Pledge to God OST

Soundtrack album by Various artists
- Released: 2018–2019
- Genre: Soundtrack
- Languages: Korean; English
- Label: Danal Entertainment

=== Part 1 ===
Released on December 8, 2018
No.	Title	Lyrics	Music	Artist	Length
1.	"The Last Promise" (마지막 약속)	Jeon Chang-yup; Ahn Su-wan	Jeon Chang-yup; Ahn Su-wan	Sohyang	5:10
2.	"The Last Promise" (Inst.)		Jeon Chang-yup; Ahn Su-wan		5:10
Total length:					10:20

=== Part 2 ===
Released on December 15, 2018
No.	Title	Lyrics	Music	Artist	Length
1.	"I Think It's An Anesthetic" (마취가 됐나봐)	Jang Chang-yup; Ryu Wonk-wang	Jeon Chang-yup; Ryu Wonk-wang	Lim Jae-hyun	4:12
2.	"I Think It's An Anesthetic" (Inst.)		Jeon Chang-yup; Ryu Wonk-wang		4:12
Total length:					8:24

=== Part 3 ===
Released on December 22, 2018
No.	Title	Lyrics	Music	Artist	Length
1.	"Can You Hear Me" (들리나요)	Kim Seong-jong	Kim Seong-jong; Mama Gorilla	Sanha	3:25
2.	"Can You Hear Me" (Inst.)		Kim Seong-jong; Mama Gorilla		3:25
Total length:					6:50

=== Part 4 ===
Released on January 5, 2019
No.	Title	Lyrics	Music	Artist	Length
1.	"An Unfilled Seat" (채워지지 않는 빈자리)	Kim Seong-ran	Kim Ji-hwan	Song Ha-ye	3:58
2.	"An Unfilled Seat" (Inst.)		Kim Ji-hwan		3:58
Total length:					7:56

=== Part 5 ===
Released on January 19, 2019
No.	Title	Lyrics	Music	Artist	Length
1.	"It Was All" (전부였더라)	Major League; Lim Yu-bin	Major League; Lim Yu-bin	Michelle Lee	3:57
2.	"It Was All" (Inst.)		Major League; Lim Yu-bin		3:57
Total length:					7:54

=== Part 6 ===
Released on January 26, 2019
No.	Title	Lyrics	Music	Artist	Length
1.	"Lie" (거짓말)	Major League; Lim Yu-bin	Major League; Lim Yu-bin	Heo Young-saeng	3:56
2.	"Lie" (Inst.)		Major League; Lim Yu-bin		3:56
Total length:					7:52

=== Part 7 ===
Released on February 2, 2019
No.	Title	Lyrics	Music	Artist	Length
1.	"Give Me A Day" (하루만 돌려줘요)	Jeon Chang-yeop; 5959Mont	Jeon Chang-yeop; 5959Mont	Yeoeun (Melody Day)	3:59
2.	"Give Me A Day" (Inst.)		Jeon Chang-yeop; 5959Mont		3:59
Total length:					7:58

=== Part 8 ===
Released on February 4, 2019
No.	Title	Artist	Length
1.	"See You In My Dreams" (꿈에서 만나요)	J-Cera	3:38
2.	"See You In My Dreams" (Inst.)		3:38
Total length:			7:16

== Viewership ==
In this table, the blue numbers represent the lowest ratings and the red numbers represent the highest ratings.

Ep.	Original broadcast date	Average audience share		
Ep.	Original broadcast date	AGB Nielsen		TNmS
Ep.	Original broadcast date	Nationwide	Seoul	Nationwide
1	November 24, 2018	9.5% (8th)	8.3% (15th)	10.1%
2	November 24, 2018	11.4% (5th)	10.5% (7th)	11.5%
3	November 24, 2018	11.4% (5th)	10.6% (6th)	10.3%
4	November 24, 2018	12.0% (4th)	11.0% (4th)	11.1%
5	December 1, 2018	8.1% (11th)	7.0% (18th)	8.9%
6	December 1, 2018	9.5% (8th)	8.4% (9th)	10.4%
7	December 1, 2018	9.9% (6th)	8.9% (8th)	9.5%
8	December 1, 2018	11.9% (3rd)	10.9% (4th)	10.7%
9	December 8, 2018	8.8% (14th)	8.0% (16th)	10.0%
10	December 8, 2018	9.7% (6th)	9.0% (9th)	11.1%
11	December 8, 2018	9.5% (7th)	8.5% (10th)	10.0%
12	December 8, 2018	10.1% (5th)	9.5% (7th)	10.8%
13	December 15, 2018	10.2% (8th)	9.6% (9th)	8.6%
14	December 15, 2018	10.7% (6th)	10.0% (8th)	9.6%
15	December 15, 2018	12.7% (5th)		11.0%
16	December 15, 2018	12.9% (4th)		11.1%
17	December 22, 2018	10.5% (7th)	10.0% (8th)	8.2%
18	December 22, 2018	11.5% (6th)	10.9% (6th)	9.0%
19	December 22, 2018	11.8% (5th)	11.3% (5th)	10.4%
20	December 22, 2018	12.1% (4th)	11.7% (4th)	11.0%
21	January 5, 2019	11.8% (6th)	10.7% (7th)	10.8%
22	January 5, 2019	13.4% (5th)	12.0% (6th)	13.1%
23	January 5, 2019	13.5% (4th)	12.6% (4th)	12.1%
24	January 5, 2019	14.8% (3rd)	13.7% (3rd)	13.2%
25	January 12, 2019	11.5% (6th)	11.0% (7th)	11.4%
26	January 12, 2019	14.5% (5th)	14.3% (5th)	13.7%
27	January 12, 2019	15.2% (4th)	15.1% (3rd)	12.5%
28	January 12, 2019	15.5% (3rd)	15.1% (3rd)	13.1%
29	January 19, 2019	11.9% (6th)	10.7% (6th)	12.4%
30	January 19, 2019	14.2% (5th)	13.1% (5th)	14.8%
31	January 19, 2019	14.8% (4th)	14.5% (4th)	14.2%
32	January 19, 2019	15.4% (3rd)	14.9% (3rd)	15.2%
33	January 26, 2019	13.2% (6th)	12.3% (6th)	12.8%
34	January 26, 2019	15.0% (5th)	14.0% (5th)	15.1%
35	January 26, 2019	15.1% (4th)	14.2% (4th)	14.1%
36	January 26, 2019	15.7% (3rd)	14.9% (3rd)	14.0%
37	February 2, 2019	12.0% (7th)	11.5% (8th)	11.8%
38	February 2, 2019	14.9% (5th)	14.8% (5th)	14.7%
39	February 2, 2019	15.2% (4th)	15.1% (4th)	14.2%
40	February 2, 2019	15.5% (3rd)	15.2% (3rd)	14.5%
41	February 9, 2019	13.4% (6th)	12.6% (7th)	13.6%
42	February 9, 2019	15.2% (4th)	14.5% (5th)	15.2%
43	February 9, 2019	15.2% (4th)	14.9% (4th)	14.6%
44	February 9, 2019	16.2% (3rd)	16.0% (3rd)	15.1%
45	February 16, 2019	14.7% (6th)	14.1% (7th)	13.6%
46	February 16, 2019	17.5% (5th)	17.0% (4th)	16.8%
47	February 16, 2019	17.8% (4th)	17.0% (4th)	15.9%
48	February 16, 2019	18.4% (3rd)	17.8% (3rd)	16.9%
Average		13.0%	12.4%	12.4%

- No episode aired on December 29, 2018 due to the broadcast of the 2018 MBC Entertainment Awards.

== Awards and nominations ==
Year	Award	Category	Recipient	Result	Ref.
2018	2018 MBC Drama Awards	Top Excellence Award, Actor in a Weekend Special Project	Bae Soo-bin	Nominated	
2018	2018 MBC Drama Awards	Top Excellence Award, Actress in a Weekend Special Project	Han Chae-young	Nominated	
2018	2018 MBC Drama Awards	Excellence Award, Actor in a Weekend Special Project	Lee Chun-hee	Nominated	
2018	2018 MBC Drama Awards	Excellence Award, Actress in a Weekend Special Project	Oh Yoon-ah	Nominated	
2018	2018 MBC Drama Awards	Golden Acting Award	Kang Boo-ja	Won	
2018	2018 MBC Drama Awards	Best Supporting Cast in Weekend Special Project	Lee Hwi-hyang	Nominated	
2018	2018 MBC Drama Awards	Best Supporting Cast in Weekend Special Project	Oh Hyun-kyung	Nominated	
2018	2018 MBC Drama Awards	Best Child Actor	Wang Seok-hyeon	Won	
