= Crying Fist =

- Hangul: 주먹이 운다
- RR: Jumeogi unda
- MR: Chumŏgi unda
- Directed by: Ryoo Seung-wan
- Written by: Ryoo Seung-wan; Jeon Cheol-hong
- Produced by: Park Jae-hyeong; Im Seung-yong
- Starring: Choi Min-sik; Ryoo Seung-bum
- Cinematography: Jo Yong-gyu
- Edited by: Nam Na-yeong
- Music by: Bang Jun-seok
- Production companies: Sio Film; Bravo Entertainment
- Distributed by: Showeast
- Release date: April 1, 2005
- Running time: 134 minutes
- Country: South Korea
- Language: Korean
- Box office: US$10 million

Crying Fist (Korean: 주먹이 운다; RR: Jumeogi unda) is a 2005 South Korean sports drama film written and directed by Ryoo Seung-wan. It stars Choi Min-sik and Ryoo Seung-bum as two desperate men, a washed-up former boxing champion and a troubled youth respectively, who face off in a high-stakes tournament that could change their lives. The film screened in the Directors' Fortnight section of the 2005 Cannes Film Festival.

== Plot ==
Kang Tae-sik, a former boxing star, promotes himself as a "human punching bag" on the streets, letting strangers beat him for money. After losing his factory, his savings, and his family, Tae-sik lives in a rooftop room and scrapes by on street fights. With his wife demanding a divorce and his son emotionally distant, Tae-sik spirals into despair until a chance encounter with a poster advertising the Rookie of the Year boxing tournament inspires him to try for one last shot at redemption.

Tae-sik's situation worsens when he is tricked by an old acquaintance, Won-tae, who promises to help but instead steals his money and disappears. Humiliated and physically broken, Tae-sik is diagnosed with early onset dementia caused by repeated head trauma. With nothing left to lose, he begs Won-tae to help him enter the boxing tournament. Surprisingly, Won-tae agrees, forging a registration form through Tae-sik's former boxing contacts and even offering to act as his coach. Motivated by a desperate need to reconnect with his son, Tae-sik begins training.

Meanwhile, Yoo Sang-hwan is a 19-year-old delinquent who lives by fighting and petty theft. After committing a robbery that leads to the accidental death of an elderly man, he is sentenced to five years in juvenile detention. There, a prison official notices his raw fighting talent and encourages him to join the boxing team. Though he initially struggles and resists authority, Sang-hwan finds purpose in boxing and begins to channel his anger and grief, especially after his father dies in a construction accident and his grandmother collapses from the shock.

Determined to win and honor his family, Sang-hwan throws himself into training and eventually defeats his prison rival Kwon-rok. Granted temporary leave, he enters the Rookie of the Year tournament alongside Tae-sik. As both fighters climb the ranks, Tae-sik relying on experience and Sang-hwan winning by knockout after knockout, they move closer to a fateful final match. Along the way, Tae-sik reconnects with his son, while Sang-hwan visits the graves of his father and grandmother, vowing to win for them.

Tae-sik and Sang-hwan battle fiercely for six rounds, their contrasting styles and motivations pushing them to the limit. Sang-hwan narrowly wins by decision. Afterward, he embraces his grandmother, overwhelmed by emotion, while Tae-sik holds his son close in the ring.

== Cast ==
- Choi Min-sik as Kang Tae-sik
- Ryoo Seung-bum as Yoo Sang-hwan
- Im Won-hee as Won-tae
- Byun Hee-bong as Sang-hwan's coach
- Na Moon-hee as Sang-hwan's grandmother
- Gi Ju-bong as Sang-hwan's father
- Chun Ho-jin as Sang-chul
- Ahn Gil-kang as head warden
- Kim Su-hyeon as Kwon-rok
- Oh Dal-su as Yong-dae
- Seo Hye-rin as Sun-ju
- Lee Joon-gu
- Kim Young-in
- Park Joo-ah
- Kim Byeong-ok as detective Oh

== Awards and nominations ==
2005 Grand Bell Awards

- Best Supporting Actress - Na Moon-hee
- Best Editing - Nam Na-yeong
- Special Jury Prize
- Nomination - Best Film
- Nomination - Best Director - Ryoo Seung-wan
- Nomination - Best Actor - Ryoo Seung-bum
- Nomination - Best Screenplay - Ryoo Seung-wan and Jeon Cheol-hong
- Nomination - Best Cinematography - Jo Yong-gyu
- Nomination - Best Lighting - Jeong Seong-cheol
- Nomination - Best Music - Bang Jun-seok
- Nomination - Best Visual Effects - Lee Jeon-hyeong (EON), Shin Joo-hee, Jang Jong-gyu, Jo Sung-jae, Jeong Do-an (Demolition)
- Nomination - Best Sound - Jeong Gun, Kim Suk-won (Blue Cap)
- Nomination - Best Planning - Im Seung-yong, Park Jae-hyeong

2005 Blue Dragon Film Awards

- Nomination - Best Actor - Ryoo Seung-bum

2005 Korean Film Awards

- Nomination - Best Film
- Nomination - Best Director - Ryoo Seung-wan
- Nomination - Best Actor - Ryoo Seung-bum
- Nomination - Best Supporting Actress - Na Moon-hee
- Nomination - Best Screenplay - Ryoo Seung-wan and Jeon Cheol-hong
- Nomination - Best Editing - Nam Na-yeong

2005 Busan Film Critics Awards

- Best Director - Ryoo Seung-wan
