= Arahan =

- Theatrical release poster
- Hangul: 아라한 장풍 대작전
- Hanja: 阿羅漢 掌風 大作戰
- RR: Arahan jangpung daejakjeon
- MR: Arahan changp'ung taejakchŏn
- Directed by: Ryoo Seung-wan
- Written by: Ryoo Seung-wan; Eun Ji-hee; Yu Seon-dong
- Produced by: Kim Mi-hee
- Starring: Ryoo Seung-bum; Yoon So-yi; Ahn Sung-ki; Jung Doo-hong
- Cinematography: Lee Jun-gyu
- Edited by: Nam Na-yeong
- Music by: Han Jae-gwon
- Distributed by: Cinema Service
- Release date: April 30, 2004 (South Korea)
- Running time: 114 minutes
- Country: South Korea
- Language: Korean

Arahan (Korean: 아라한 장풍 대작전) is a 2004 South Korean action film directed by Ryoo Seung-wan and starring his brother Ryoo Seung-bum along with Yoon So-yi, Ahn Sung-ki and Jung Doo-hong. The film was a relative commercial success, selling over 2 million tickets domestically, but wasn't as well received by critics as Ryoo Seung-wan's previous films.

== Plot ==
Long ago, a warlord searched for the key. This key would grant its owner the power to rule the world. His search for it unleashed the evil in the hearts of men. So they began to kill each other one by one. However, the Tao Masters had taken an oath not to interfere in the battles of the people. One of them, Heuk-woon, was so horrified by the atrocities that he was filled with uncontrollable rage. Full of anger, he intervened and killed the warlord. Blinded by his madness and his abilities, he decided to take the key himself and become Arahan to bring peace. The remaining six Tao Masters imprisoned him in an underground dungeon, knowing that in his lust for power he would only cause more chaos and death. They took turns keeping the key until the true Arahan arrived.

In the present day, the clumsy auxiliary police officer Sang-hwan is accidentally hit with an energy attack by Eui-jin, a prospective Aruchi (female Tao master), while pursuing a thief. She then takes him to her father Ja-woon, a Maruchi (male Tao master) and current guardian of the key. He and his companions realize that Sang-hwan has an extraordinary amount of Qi, spiritual energy. They offer to train him. He agrees, hoping that everyone will finally stop laughing at him and beating him up. After some initial difficulties, he develops impressive skills. At the same time, construction workers are uncovering Heuk-woon's dungeon. Heuk-woon has survived for centuries using dark Qi. In his search for the key, he hunts down the masters and drains everyone's life energy until only Eui-jin's father and Mu-woon remain.

When he breaks into the Tao school, Eui-jin and Sang-hwan try almost unsuccessfully to stop him. Sang-hwan lands a lucky hit with a small boulder. Mu-woon gives chase but is ultimately killed by a sword thrust. Ja-woon tells them both about Heuk-woon and entrusts each of them with a half of the key. They then set off out of town in their car. Eui-jin doesn't want to abandon her father, however, and leaves Sang-hwan to drive on alone. Sang-hwan also turns back after a moment of anger. The final battle takes place in the city museum. Heuk-woon manages to take their share of the key from both of them, but is still defeated by Sang-hwan. The key (an image of a dragon) then seeps into the ground. The thief at the beginning of the story is once again pursued by Sang-hwan and Eui-jin, this time as a team. When Sang-hwan's new colleague arrives, Eui-jin hits him with the same energy attack as Sang-hwan. The two begin a discussion about their inaccuracy. The camera pans up to show several people jumping across the city's rooftops.

== Cast ==
- Ryoo Seung-bum as Sang-hwan
- Yoon So-yi as Eui-jin
- Ahn Sung-ki as Ja-woon
- Jung Doo-hong as Heuk-woon
- Kim Su-hyeon as the TV host
- Kim Hyo-seon as the TV host
- Yoon Joo-sang as Mu-woon
- Kim Ji-young as Banya
- Baek Chan-gi as Seol-woon
- Kim Young-in as Yeok-bong
- Park Yoon-bae as Officer Choi
- Lee Won as Seon-dong
- Bong Tae-gyu as Officer Bong
- Lee Oi-soo as Baek Poong
- Ahn Gil-kang as Mr. Gang
