= Wang Seok-hyeon =

South Korean actor (born 2003)

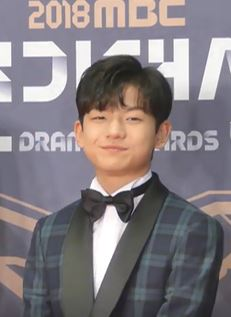
- Wang during 2018 MBC Drama Awards
- Born: June 2, 2003 (age 23); Yangsan, South Korea
- Education: School of Performing Arts Seoul (dropped out)
- Occupation: Actor
- Years active: 2008–present

Korean name
- Hangul: 왕석현
- Hanja: 王晳鉉
- RR: Wang Seokhyeon
- MR: Wang Sŏkhyŏn

Wang Seok-hyeon (Korean: 왕석현; born June 2, 2003) is a South Korean actor. He is known for his role in the 2008 film Scandal Makers.

== Filmography ==
=== Film ===
Year	Title	Role	Notes
2008	Scandal Makers	Hwang Ki-dong	
2010	Hearty Paws 2	video store patron	Cameo
2011	Song of Dreams	Ni-moon	
2012	Return of the Mafia	Hyun-woo	

=== Television series ===
Year	Title	Role	Notes/Ref.
2009	My Fair Lady	Kang Soo-min	
2012	Can't Live Without You	Kim Ki-chan	
2013	Ad Genius Lee Tae-baek	Kim Ha-rang	Cameo
2018	Still 17	Kim Hyung-tae (young)	
2018	A Pledge to God	Song Hyun-woo	

=== Variety show ===
Year	Title	Network	Notes/Ref.
2020	King of Mask Singer	MBC	Contestant as "Bongsook" (episode 283)

== Awards and nominations ==
Year	Award	Category	Nominated work	Result	Ref.
2009	2nd Korea Junior Star Awards	Grand Prize	Scandal Makers	Won	
2009	17th Chunsa Film Art Awards	Best Young Actor	Scandal Makers	Won	
2009	3rd Mnet 20's Choice Awards	HOT New Star	Scandal Makers	Nominated	
2009	23rd KBS Drama Awards	Best Young Actor	My Fair Lady	Nominated	
2012	31st MBC Drama Awards	Best Young Actor	Can't Live Without You	Nominated	
2018	37th MBC Drama Awards	Best Young Actor	A Pledge to God	Won	
