= Ryoo Seung-bum =

South Korean actor (born 1980)

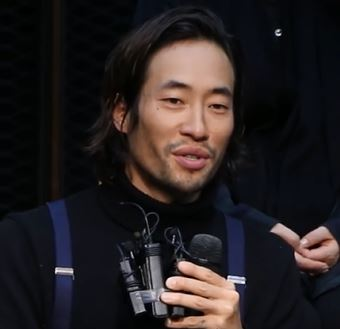
- Ryoo in 2017
- Born: August 9, 1980 (age 46); Asan, South Korea
- Occupation: Actor
- Years active: 1999–present
- Agent: Y One Entertainment
- Spouse: Unknown (m. 2020)
- Children: 1
- Family: Ryoo Seung-wan (brother)

Korean name
- Hangul: 류승범
- RR: Ryu Seungbeom
- MR: Ryu Sŭngbŏm

Ryoo Seung-bum (Korean: 류승범; born August 9, 1980) is a South Korean actor. He made a name for himself in a variety of eclectic films directed by his older brother Ryoo Seung-wan, notably Die Bad (his acting debut in 2000), Arahan (2004), Crying Fist (2005), The Unjust (2010), and The Berlin File (2013). Known for his manic energy, calm demeanor, and subtle ability to command a scene, over the years Ryoo has cemented himself as one of Korea's top actors.

== Early life ==
Ryoo Seung-bum was born in Asan, South Chungcheong Province. His family moved to Seoul, where he first attended Jamjeon Elementary School, before moving back to a small town in South Chungcheong Province called Onyang, where he spent his middle school years. He returned to Seoul to study at Daedong Technical High School, but dropped out before graduating. Ryoo later said he had a hard time finding the motivation to study, but acting would bring about an important change in his life, giving him something he could immerse himself in.

== Career ==
=== 1999–2004: Early career ===
His older brother Ryoo Seung-wan was at the time an aspiring filmmaker, and from 1996 to 1999, he shot four low-budget short films starring himself, his younger brother Seung-bum, and several friends. In strikingly diverse styles but with similar narratives, these shorts were re-edited, combined and released in 2000 as Ryoo Seung-wan's feature directorial debut Die Bad. Critically acclaimed as powerfully visceral, gut-wrenching, and searingly angry, the film became an instant cult hit, earning attention for the Ryoo brothers. One review described Ryoo Seung-bum's acting debut as "a startling, naturalistic turn," and he won Best New Actor at the Grand Bell Awards.

Their success continued with Ryoo Seung-wan's follow-up Dachimawa Lee, a 35-minute short film parodying Korean action films of the 60s and 70s, Bruce Lee, Shaw Brothers and Jackie Chan flicks, and the machismo kitsch of old Korean melodramas, coupled with over-the-top voice dubbing and deliberately mistimed action. Ryoo played Washington, a young thug with a heart of gold and a huge afro. The short, streamed on the now-defunct Cine4M website, was enormously popular online.

Ryoo next starred in Yim Soon-rye's Waikiki Brothers, a 2001 film chronicling the fate of a mediocre nightclub band, with its bittersweet mixture of boyhood aspirations and love of music, overlaid with the struggles and reality of adulthood. Ryoo had a supporting role as a young waiter eager to learn how to play the drums and perform onstage.

Later that year, he ventured into television, as part of the main cast of a 50-episode family drama Wonderful Days, along with Ji Sung, Park Sun-young, and Gong Hyo-jin. Ryoo received Best New Actor for TV from the Baeksang Arts Awards.

In 2002, he appeared in Ryoo Seung-wan's sophomore effort, the gangster/heist film No Blood No Tears starring Jeon Do-yeon and Jung Jae-young. The film was a critical and box office disappointment. But he was starting to make a name for himself in the industry separate from his brother. Ryoo joined Jung, Shin Ha-kyun, and an ensemble cast of Jang Jin regulars in No Comment (also known as Mudjima Family), an omnibus comprising three short films. His performance as a put-upon concierge was one of the highlights of the first short Enemies in Four Directions. He also had a small but memorable role in Park Chan-wook's Sympathy for Mr. Vengeance.

He then reunited with Noh Hee-kyung, the writer of Wonderful Days, in the TV drama Solitude, a May–December romance between a man in his early twenties and a much older terminally ill single mother (played by Lee Mi-sook).

Conduct Zero capped Ryoo's year, in his first big-screen leading role as the tough, brawn-over-brain "king" of his high school who unexpectedly and awkwardly falls for a nerdy girl (played by Lim Eun-kyung). The 1980s-set comedy was a minor hit, selling nearly 1.7 million tickets and solidifying Ryoo's stardom.

Ryoo made his theater debut in Lee Sang-woo's stage play Bieonso (Korean: 비언소; "Toilet"). Directed by stage/TV actor Park Kwang-jung, Bieonso ran at the Dongsoong Art Center from November 4 to December 28, 2003.

For the TV program Nursery Story, Ryoo and Yoon Jin-seo appeared in Christmas Lovers, which aired in four five-minute daily installments on MBC in December 22 to December 25, 2003. In Min Kyu-dong's short Secrets and Lies (released by the Korean Academy of Film Arts in the 2003 omnibus Twentidentity), Ryoo's character finds himself in a dilemma when his fiancee's mother hits on him.

Ryoo began 2004 in the TV series Sunlight Pours Down co-starring Song Hye-kyo and Jo Hyun-jae, but it didn’t catch on with audiences. Thereafter Ryoo would concentrate solely on film.

In Ryoo Seung-wan's Arahan, he played a hapless traffic cop who discovers he has untapped martial arts skills, and he's trained by masters played by Ahn Sung-ki and Yoon So-yi. Part modern-day wuxia, part superhero film and part small-town comedy, it was Ryoo Seung-wan's first foray into commercial cinema, and the film was a moderate box office success at around 2 million tickets sold. It also solidified Ryoo's star charisma and his natural affinity for comedy.

Ryoo then starred in Kim Sung-su's online short Back (streamed on Daum in October 2004). Set in a dystopia where everyone literally moves backward, his character sparks a revolution and becomes hunted by the authorities for daring to move forward.

=== 2005–2007: Critical success ===
Though Ryoo had been steadily impressing critics and audiences since his debut, it was Crying Fist in 2005 that would change his career. Considered a showcase for the talents of the Ryoo brothers, the movie is a real-life-inspired story of two boxers, showing their journeys in a parallel narrative structure: one is a hardened teenage criminal who takes up boxing in reform school, the other a retired boxer in his forties earning his keep as a "human punching bag" who returns to the ring partly to redeem himself in the eyes of his son and wife. Only at the climax would the two protagonists meet as opponents in the final match, two men from different backgrounds and social positions, but united in their status as total losers, struggling to regain self-respect and purpose in their lives. Ryoo and co-star Choi Min-sik underwent boxing training like they were preparing for a real match; they didn't use body doubles in the scene and exchanged real blows. Director Ryoo Seung-wan discussed on the film's DVD how his brother had to access his real personality and real-life memories for his onscreen breakdown, and critics praised Ryoo's range, caged fury and passion in the role, calling the performance amazing and mesmerizing, such that he overshadowed his older, more prestigious colleague Choi. Crying Fist opened against A Bittersweet Life, and despite excellent reviews for both films, they ended up canceling each other out at the box office, selling a little over a million tickets each. This performance cemented Ryoo's reputation as one of the top actors of his generation, and one of the country's leading acting figures.

For a change of pace, Ryoo next starred in the romantic comedy The Beast and the Beauty, playing a voice actor who lies about his looks to his blind pianist girlfriend (played by Shin Min-ah).

In 2006, his real-life ex-girlfriend Gong Hyo-jin asked him to make a cameo appearance in Kim Tae-yong's critically acclaimed drama Family Ties. He played her character's ex-boyfriend, lending a meta aspect and irony to their few scenes together.

He then returned to film noir with Bloody Tie opposite Hwang Jung-min (they had previously worked together in Waikiki Brothers). Set amidst the meth drug trade in Busan after the IMF crisis, the film drew unanimously positive reviews. Critics praised Ryoo's portrayal of a small-time drug dealer, and he won Best Actor at the Golden Cinematography Awards and the Baeksang Arts Awards.

Ryoo and Im Chang-jung lent their voices to the adult animated comedy Aachi & Ssipak, set in a futuristic world fueled by human feces where the government implants a microchip into each of its citizens' anuses to check their bowel movements for stable energy supply, rewarding good performance with addictive popsicles. As the title characters, Ryoo and Im play street gangsters who steal popsicles and sell them in the black market. Ryoo reprised his role as Aachi; he had previously voiced the character in a Flash animated demo clip introduced as an internet sneak preview in 2001 (Ssipak was originally voiced by Im Won-hee), However, due to investor problems, it would take a total of eight years for the feature-length film to be finished. Like its predecessors in homegrown animation My Beautiful Girl, Mari and Wonderful Days, Aachi & Ssipak was well-reviewed, but a box office flop.

In 2007, Ryoo had a small role in Im Chang-jung's comedy Underground Rendezvous. He played a teacher assigned to a mountainous village, but who gets trapped in the middle of nowhere for three months, unable to move his right foot after stepping on a land mine; reviews called his cameo appearance "hilarious."

=== 2008–2010: Genre expansion ===
Radio Dayz marked Ryoo's next leading role in 2008. He played Lloyd, a fast-thinking producer of an underfunded and understaffed radio program during Japanese colonial rule in 1930. To gain listeners, he creates a radio drama, the first of its kind in Korea, using formulaic tropes such as love triangles, amnesia, long-lost siblings, etc. The show's success also attracts the attention of the Japanese colonial government, and one of his voice actors is secretly working for the Korean Independence Army. Ryoo was praised for his versatility and nuanced take on the role, but the film did not do well at the box office.

Ryoo Seung-wan's next film Dachimawa Lee returned to the beloved character from his 2000 short (played by Im Won-hee). The spy action film/parody is set during the 1940s in the last years of Japanese colonial rule, as Dachimawa Lee, his allies and enemies search for the whereabouts of a stolen national treasure, a golden Buddha statue that also contains a list of Korean freedom fighters wanted by imperial authorities. Ryoo played one of the minor villains, making quirky vagabond Border Lynx into a likeable rogue.

In 2009, Ryoo, Park Hae-il, Moon So-ri, and Uhm Ji-won starred in Baik Hyun-jhin's 33-minute short film The End, in which four episodes with different stories all end with the close-up shot of the actor's facial expressions for more than 1 minute, then superimposed is the text, "The End."

Ryoo said he chose his next film, No Mercy, simply because he wanted to work with actor Sul Kyung-gu. Ryoo played an environmental activist who confesses to a series of murders, then forces a renowned autopsy specialist (played by Sol) to compromise all his professional ethics by tampering with autopsy results in order to save his kidnapped daughter from being killed. The film was criticized for its lack of visual style and convoluted plot, but reviews said the film's highlight was the dramatic intensity between the two lead actors in their confrontation scenes in the police interrogation room, with Ryoo playing his role with a subtle eeriness.

Kim Dae-woo's The Servant subverted the classic folktale Chunhyangjeon with the premise that the heroine Chunhyang is ambitious instead of virtuous, and that she falls in love with Bang-ja, the servant of Lee Mong-ryong (while Lee, played by Ryoo, is far from heroic). Co-starring Kim Joo-hyuk and Jo Yeo-jeong, the costume drama depicted the Joseon era's sexual mores and class system with sly humor and cynicism.

Ensemble comedy Foxy Festival explored unconventional sexual preferences in a light-hearted and non-judgmental manner, and in it Ryoo played a fish sausage ("odeng") hawker with a RealDoll fetish.

His most significant film in 2010 was The Unjust. When a fall guy is chosen for a highly publicized serial killer case, a homicide detective (played by Hwang Jung-min), a prosecutor (played by Ryoo), and a shady real-estate tycoon (played by Yoo Hae-jin) all become involved in a complex web of power struggle. The crime thriller was a hard-hitting indictment of corruption at every level of Korea's justice infrastructure. This was his fifth collaboration with Ryoo Seung-wan, who said, "My decision to cast him isn't just because he's my younger brother. It has mostly to do with the fact he's a great actor and it's comfortable for me to work with him." For Ryoo's stunningly accurate portrayal of the arrogance, rudeness and weariness of stereotypical Korean middle-aged men in positions of power, he won Best Actor at the Buil Film Awards and the Fantasia Festival in Canada.

=== 2011–2013: Mainstream success ===
In the 2011 comedy The Suicide Forecast, Ryoo played a baseball player-turned-top insurance salesman whose promotion is jeopardized when the police suspect him of aiding and abetting a client's suicide, so he goes on a quest to get in touch with his "suspicious" life insurance clients and turn their lives around for the better. Ryoo was criticized for giving curt answers to the press at the movie premiere; his agency apologized on his behalf, saying it was his first time to see the film in its entirety so he needed time to organize his thoughts. Ryoo later called human comedy "an extremely cruel genre" to "people who are actually living that reality by making people laugh and cry over someone's pain." But he said he liked the film for trying "to draw a hopeful message from out of it and offer cheerful consolation rather than handle it in a depressing way."

Ryoo played a zombie in Yim Pil-sung's short film A Brave New World, part of the science fiction omnibus Doomsday Book. His zombie make-up took six hours daily to put on. Ryoo shot the film in 2006, but because of financing problems, it was only released in 2012.

In 2012, he joined the cast of black comedy Over My Dead Body, along with Lee Beom-soo and Kim Ok-vin. Ryoo was a scene stealer in the role of a daft character who fakes his own death in order to hide from loan sharks and collect his insurance money, but stumbles into two researchers attempting to steal a corpse with an embedded computer chip containing stolen technology.

Later that year, he starred in Perfect Number, a film adaptation of popular Japanese mystery novel The Devotion of Suspect X by Keigo Higashino. Ryoo played a genius mathematics professor who plans the perfect alibi for the woman he secretly loves (played by Lee Yo-won) when she unexpectedly murders her abusive ex-husband. He said it was his first time to portray self-sacrificing love, and director Bang Eun-jin commended the maturity in his acting when she instructed him "to cry with your heart, not with the face."

He was cast in a supporting role in The Berlin File, Ryoo Seung-wan's 2013 spy thriller also starring Ha Jung-woo, Han Suk-kyu, and Jun Ji-hyun. Playing a ruthless assassin and the son of a high ranking North Korean official, Ryoo spoke German, English, and North Korean dialect in the film. The New York Times praised his portrayal for its "electrifying viciousness," and The Korea Times called him "brilliant." The Berlin File sold more than 7 million tickets, making it Korea's top all-time action movie. It is also the biggest hit of Ryoo's career thus far.

=== 2015–present: Hiatus and selective comeback ===
Following The Berlin File, Ryoo went on a hiatus from show business because he said he no longer wanted to be an "overly commercialized product." He traveled all over Europe, then lived in Paris for three years where he worked as a model. Ryoo returned to acting in 2015 with a leading role in Im Sang-soo's Intimate Enemies, a thriller about four people who find bags of money at a car crash site and decide to use it to mete out revenge against corrupt corporations.

In 2017, Ryoo was cast in Kim Ki-duk's drama film Human, Space, Time and Human.

In 2019, Ryoo starred in the third installment of the Tazza film series, Tazza: One Eyed Jack.

In March 2023, Ryoo signed with Y One Entertainment.

== Other activities ==
Since 2007, he has been an in-demand club DJ under the name DJ Ryoo.

He, Shin Min-ah and Hyun Bin were chosen as models for the laptop LG Xnote in 2008. In line with this, they appeared in the branded entertainment campaign Summer Days, which aired in seven short films or episodes (each approximately 4 minutes long; total running time is 30 minutes). These included two music videos by You Hee-yeol: Summer Day featuring Shin Jae-pyung of Peppertones, and My Happy Day sung by Shin Min-ah.

Ryoo is friends with Gary and Gil, who compose the hip hop duo Leessang. He has appeared in several music videos for their songs, including Ballerino (2007) and The Girl Who Can't Break Up, The Boy Who Can't Leave (2009), which were both directed by his brother Ryoo Seung-wan. Ryoo won the Music Video Acting award at the Mnet KM Music Festival (now called the Mnet Asian Music Awards) for Leessang's I'm Not Laughing (2005). They also collaborated on the Bloody Tie track Who Are You Living For? (2006), with Hwang Jung-min on vocals, and Leessang and Ryoo as rappers. Ryoo Seung-Bum and Leessang toured together to Sydney, Australia for the first time in 2009 with show producer, Leonard Dela Torre.

He is also known in the entertainment industry as an eccentric dresser, simultaneously landing him in worst-dressed lists, while others label him an experimental "fashionista." Ryoo said he believes fashion is a form of communication, and aims for wit in his personal style. In an interview, celebrity photographer Zo Sunhi called Ryoo her favorite subject, saying, "He's someone who has shown his soul in front of the camera. He's the one person who wasn't inhibited or concerned with how amazing he should look, nor did he try to hide anything in front of the lens. There was no false pretenses or superficiality to him. He was an open book. Truly a free spirit. And because he didn't care how he looked, there was truth in his photographs."

== Personal life ==
=== Marriage ===
In 2020, Ryoo married his non-celebrity Slovak girlfriend who is 10 years younger than him and with whom he had had a daughter. Ryoo's wife is known to have worked as a painter in France.

== Filmography ==
=== Film ===
Year	Title	Role	Notes/Ref.
2000	Die Bad	Sang-hwan	
2000	Dachimawa Lee	Washington	Short film
2001	Guns & Talks	Motorcycle biker	Bit part
2001	Waikiki Brothers	Gi-tae	
2002	No Blood No Tears	Chae Min-soo	
2002	Sympathy for Mr. Vengeance	Young man with cerebral palsy	Cameo
2002	No Comment	Hotel concierge	Segment: "Enemies in Four Directions"
2002	No Comment	Actor in Happy Together parody movie	Segment: "The Church Sister"
2002	Conduct Zero	Park Joong-pil	
2003	Twentidentity		Segment: "Secrets and Lies"
2004	Arahan	Sang-hwan	
2004	Back		Short film
2005	Crying Fist	Yoo Sang-hwan	
2005	The Beast and the Beauty	Gu Dong-gun	
2006	Bloody Tie	Lee Sang-do	
2006	Family Ties	Joon-ho	Cameo
2006	Aachi & Ssipak (animated)	Aachi	Voice
2007	Underground Rendezvous	Jang-geun	Cameo
2008	Radio Dayz	Lloyd	
2008	Dachimawa Lee	Border Lynx	
2009	The End	Seung-bum	Short film
2010	No Mercy	Lee Sung-ho	
2010	The Servant	Lee Mong-ryong	
2010	The Unjust	Joo Yang	
2010	Foxy Festival	Choi-kang Sang-du	
2011	The Suicide Forecast	Bae Byung-woo	
2012	Doomsday Book	Yoon Seok-woo	Segment: "A Brave New World"
2012	Over My Dead Body	Ahn Jin-oh	
2012	Perfect Number	Kim Seok-go	
2013	The Berlin File	Dong Myung-soo	
2013	New World	Constable Kang Cheol-hwa	Cameo
2015	Intimate Enemies	Ji-noo	
2016	The Net	Nam Chul-woo	
2018	Human, Space, Time and Human	Gangster boss	
2019	Tazza: One Eyed Jack	Aekku	
2025	Good News	Director Park Sang-hyeon	The film will have its world premiere at the 2025 Toronto International Film Festival

=== Television series ===
Year	Title	Role
2001–2002	Wonderful Days	Jang Cheol-jin
2002	Solitude	Min Young-woo
2003	Nursery Story "Christmas Lovers"	
2004	Sunlight Pours Down	Kim Min-ho
2010	Pasta	restaurant customer (cameo, episode 9)
2023	Moving	Frank
2024	Family Matters	Baek Cheol-hee

=== Music video appearances ===
Year	Title	Artist	Co-star	Director
2000	"Soliloquy"	Kim Jang-hoon	Hong Se-eun	
2002	"The Name"	The Name	Tony Leung Chiu-Wai, Jeon Do-yeon	Cha Eun-taek
2003	"Lonely Street Lights"	Han Young-ae	Kang Hye-jung	Bong Joon-ho
2005	"I'm Not Laughing"	Leessang feat. ALi	Yum Jung-ah	
2007	"Ballerino"	Leessang feat. ALi	Park Yeo-jin	Ryoo Seung-wan
2009	"The Girl Who Can't Break Up, The Boy Who Can't Leave"	Leessang feat. Jung-in	Lee Hyori	Ryoo Seung-wan
2012	"When I Look at Myself"	Kim Tae-woo		

== Theater ==
Year	Title	Role
2003	Bieonso	

== Discography ==
Year	Title	Artist	Notes/Ref.
2002	Ryoo Seung-bum's Dance Timemachine	Various artists	Album
2002	"Agasshi"	Ryoo Seung-bum, Park Hae-il, Kim Jong-eun, Jung Dae-yong, and Lee Min-ho	bonus track from Waikiki Brothers OST
2004	"따블이에게"	Double K feat. Mr. R	track 6 from Positive Mind (album)
2006	"Who Are You Living For?"	Leessang feat. Hwang Jung-min and Ryoo Seung-bum	track 27 from Bloody Tie OST

== Accolades ==
=== Awards and nominations ===
Year	Award	Category	Nominated work	Result	Ref.
2001	37th Baeksang Arts Awards	Best New Actor (Film)	Die Bad	Nominated	
2001	38th Grand Bell Awards	Best New Actor	Die Bad	Won	
2001	SBS Drama Awards	New Star Award	Wonderful Days	Won	
2002	38th Baeksang Arts Awards	Best New Actor (TV)	Wonderful Days	Won	
2003	24th Blue Dragon Film Awards	Best New Actor	Conduct Zero	Nominated	
2004	41st Grand Bell Awards	Best Actor	Arahan	Nominated	
2005	42nd Grand Bell Awards	Best Actor	Crying Fist	Nominated	
2005	26th Blue Dragon Film Awards	Best Actor	Crying Fist	Nominated	
2005	4th Korean Film Awards	Best Actor	Crying Fist	Nominated	
2005	7th Mnet KM Music Festival	Best Actor in a Music Video	I'm Not Laughing	Won	
2006	43rd Grand Bell Awards	Best Actor	Bloody Tie	Nominated	
2006	2nd Premiere Rising Star Awards	Best Actor	Bloody Tie	Won	
2006	5th Korean Film Awards	Best Actor	Bloody Tie	Nominated	
2007	30th Golden Cinematography Awards	Best Actor	Bloody Tie	Won	
2007	43rd Baeksang Arts Awards	Best Actor (Film)	Bloody Tie	Won	
2008	2nd Mnet 20's Choice Awards	Hot Fashionista	—N/a	Won	
2010	14th Puchon International Fantastic Film Festival	Actor's Award	No Mercy	Won	
2011	8th Max Movie Awards	Best Actor	The Unjust	Nominated	
2011	5th Asian Film Awards	Best Supporting Actor	The Unjust	Nominated	
2011	47th Baeksang Arts Awards	Best Actor (Film)	The Unjust	Nominated	
2011	15th Fantasia Festival	Best Actor	The Unjust	Won	
2011	20th Buil Film Awards	Best Actor	The Unjust	Won	
2025	Director's Cut Awards	Best Actor (Series)	Family Matters	Nominated	
2025	ContentAsia Awards	Best Male Lead in a TV Programme/Series Made in Asia	Family Matters	Won; Silver Prize	

=== Listicles ===
Name of publisher, year listed, name of listicle, and placement
Publisher	Year	Listicle	Rank	Ref.
The Screen	2019	2009–2019 Top Box Office Powerhouse Actors in Korean Movies	35th	
