= Kang Hyeong-cheol =

South Korean filmmaker

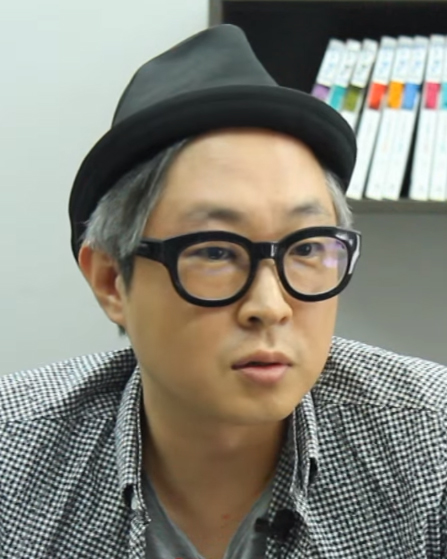
- Kang in 2014
- Born: Jeju Island, South Korea
- Other name: Kang Hyoung-chul
- Education: Yong In University
- Occupations: Director, screenwriter
- Years active: 2008-present

Korean name
- Hangul: 강형철
- RR: Gang Hyeongcheol
- MR: Kang Hyŏngch'ŏl

Kang Hyeong-cheol is a South Korean film director and screenwriter. His first two films Scandal Makers (2008) and Sunny (2011) were the highest grossing Korean films of their respective years, and are both among the highest grossing Korean films of all time. Kang won Best Director at the 48th Grand Bell Awards in 2011.

== Filmography ==
=== Film ===
Feature films credits of Kang Hyeong-cheol
Year	Title		Credited as			Ref.
Year	English	Korean	Director	Writer	Actor	Ref.
2008	Scandal Makers	과속스캔들	Yes	Yes	No	
2011	Sunny	써니	Yes	Yes	No	
2012	Cine Note - segment "It Could Happen to You"	시네노트 - 당신에게 일어날 수 있는 일	Yes	Yes	No	
2013	Cheer Up, Mr. Lee	힘내세요, 병헌씨	No	No	Yes	
2014	Tazza: The Hidden Card	타짜: 신의 손	Yes	Yes	No	
2018	Swing Kids	스윙키즈	Yes	Yes	No	
2025	Hi-Five	하이파이브	Yes	Yes	No	

== Awards and nominations ==
Year	Award	Category	Nominated work	Result
2009	45th Baeksang Arts Awards	Best Screenplay (Film)	Scandal Makers	Won
2009	45th Baeksang Arts Awards	Best New Director (Film)	Scandal Makers	Nominated
2009	11th Far East Film Festival	Audience Award	Scandal Makers	2nd Place
2009	12th Shanghai International Film Festival	Asian New Talent Award for Best Film	Scandal Makers	Won
2009	17th lcheon Chunsa Film Festival	Best New Director	Scandal Makers	Nominated
2009	29th Korean Association of Film Critics Awards	Best New Director	Scandal Makers	Won
2009	30th Blue Dragon Film Awards	Best New Director	Scandal Makers	Won
2011	20th Buil Film Awards	Best Director	Sunny	Nominated
2011	48th Grand Bell Awards	Best Director	Sunny	Won
2011	48th Grand Bell Awards	Best Screenplay	Sunny	Nominated
2011	4th Style Icon Awards	Content of the Year	Sunny	Won
2011	32nd Blue Dragon Film Awards	Best Director	Sunny	Nominated
2011	32nd Blue Dragon Film Awards	Best Screenplay	Sunny	Nominated
2012	3rd KOFRA Film Awards	Best Director	Sunny	Won
2014	51st Grand Bell Awards	Best Director	Tazza: The Hidden Card	Nominated
2019	55th Baeksang Arts Awards	Best Director (Film)	Swing Kids	Won
2019	40th Blue Dragon Film Awards	Best Director	Swing Kids	Nominated
2019	19th Director's Cut Awards	Best Director	Swing Kids	Nominated
2025	46th Blue Dragon Film Awards	Best Screenplay	Hi-Five	Nominated
