= Style Icon Asia =

- Awarded for: Excellence in fashion, broadcasting, culture, arts
- Location: Dongdaemun Design Plaza
- Country: South Korea
- Presented by: CJ E&M
- First award: October 30, 2008
- Final award: March 15, 2016
- Website: sia.interest.me

Style Icon Asia (SIA, formerly known as Style Icon Awards) is an awards ceremony held annually in South Korea since 2008 to showcase Asian fashion designers and to honor individuals who have made the most outstanding contributions in setting new paradigms and trends in fashion, broadcasting, culture and arts.

== Awards ==
=== 2008 ===
The first awards ceremony was held on October 30, 2008 at Club Answer in Cheongdam-dong.

Award	Winner(s)
Style Icon of the Year	Rain, Chang Mi-hee
Actor	Lee Jung-jae
Actress	Son Ye-jin
Male singer	Big Bang
Female singer	Seo In-young
Culture and Art	Richard Yongjae O'Neill, Kim Yong-ho
Politics	Na Kyung-won
Sports	Yoshihiro Akiyama
Model	Jang Yoon-ju
TV	Kim Hee-ae
Beautiful Sharing	Sean, Jung Hye-young
Fun Fearless Female	Son Ye-jin
New Icon	Shinee
Special Award	Lee Eon
Fashionista	Jung Ryeo-won
World Icon	Park Tae-hwan

=== 2009 ===
The second awards ceremony was held on November 11, 2009 at N Seoul Tower.

Award	Winner(s)
Style Icon of the Year	Kim Hye-soo
Actor	Jung Woo-sung
Actress	Ha Ji-won
Male talent	Kwon Sang-woo
Female talent	Kim Hye-soo
TV Star	Kim Nam-joo
Male singer	Drunken Tiger
Female singer	2NE1
Model	Kim Young-kwang
Sports	Shin-Soo Choo
Male fashionista	Kim Sung-soo
Female fashionista	Shin Min-a
New Icon (TV)	Kim Nam-gil
New Icon (Film)	Lee Min-ki
Performing Arts	Lee Seung-chul
Special Award	Jang Jin-young
Culture and Art	Park Chan-wook
Popular Icon	Kim Hyun-joong
Beautiful Sharing	Kim Hye-ja, Ha Ji-won
Fun Fearless Female	Ha Ji-won

=== 2010 ===
The third awards ceremony was held on November 17, 2010 at the CJ E&M Center in Seoul.

Award	Winner(s)
Style Icon of the Year	Lee Byung-hun
International Style Icon	So Ji-sub
Style Icon – TV Star	Kim Jung-eun
Style Icon – Fashionista	Oh Yeon-soo
Style Icon – Actor	Joo Jin-mo
Style Icon – Actress	Lee Min-jung
Style Icon – Male talent	Chun Jung-myung
Style Icon – Female talent	Shin Min-a
Style Icon – Male singer	2PM
Style Icon – Female singer	2NE1
Style Icon – Culture and Art	Kolleen Park
Style Icon – Model	Han Jin
New Style Icon – Actor (Film)	T.O.P
New Style Icon – Talent	Song Joong-ki
New Style Icon – Singer	CNBLUE
Popular Icon	Kim Hyun-joong
Designer of the Year	Tory Burch
Style Leader	Gong Hyo-jin
Special Award	André Kim
Beautiful Sharing	Tiger JK, Yoon Mi-rae

=== 2011 ===
The fourth awards ceremony was held on November 3, 2011 at the CJ E&M Center in Seoul.

Award	Winner(s)
Style Icon of the Year	Cha Seung-won
Style Icon	IU, Go Soo, Ji Sung, Lena Park, Yoo Ah-in, Jung Jae-hyung, Superstar K, Ko So-young, Girls' Generation, Cha Seung-won
Style Specialist	Jung Yoon-gi
KIA Soul People's Choice	Kim Hyun-joong
SIA's Choice	Lee Jong-suk
New Icon	Shin Se-kyung, Kim Soo-hyun
Content of the Year	Kang Hyeong-cheol for Sunny
SIA's Discovery	Park Si-hoo, Cho Yeo-jeong

=== 2012 ===
The fifth awards ceremony was held on October 25, 2012 at the CJ E&M Center in Seoul.

Award	Winner(s)
Style Icon of the Year	Jang Dong-gun
Style Icon	Im Soo-jung, Seo In-guk & Jung Eun-ji, Bae Suzy, Yoo Jun-sang, Jang Dong-gun, Song Joong-ki, Psy, Ha Jung-woo, Super Junior, Sistar
Special Award	Yoon Bok-hee
SK II People's Choice	Yoon Mi-rae
Fashion Icon	Go Joon-hee
New Icon	Jo Yoon-hee, Jo Jung-suk

=== 2013 ===
The sixth awards ceremony was held on October 24, 2013 at the CJ E&M Center in Seoul.

Award	Winner(s)
Style Icon of the Year	G-Dragon
Style Icon	Dynamic Duo, Tilda Swinton, Gong Hyo-jin, Shin Dong-yup, Yeo Jin-goo, Lee Jong-suk, Lee Seo-jin, G-Dragon, Jung Woo-sung, Sistar
Content of the Year	Na Young-seok for Grandpas Over Flowers
Style Specialist	Juun.J (Jung Wook-joon)
Best K-Style	Choi Soo-young, Choi Jin-hyuk
New Icon	Crayon Pop
Global Icon	ASAP Rocky
Chevrolet Find New Star	Clara Lee

=== 2014 ===
The seventh awards ceremony was held on October 28, 2014 at Dongdaemun Design Plaza. It was hosted by Jang Yoon-ju and Jung Joon-young.

Award	Winner(s)
Style Icon of the Year	Jo In-sung
Style Icon	Kim Hee-ae, Kim Soo-hyun, Jo In-sung, Go Ara, Girls' Generation-TTS, 4Minute, Yoo Yeon-seok, Park Hae-jin, g.o.d, Soyou
Tony Moly K-Beauty	Nana
K-Style	Park Hae-jin
Iconic Designer	Steve J & Yoni P
New Icon	Winner, Sung Joon, Han Groo

=== 2016 ===
The eighth awards ceremony was held on March 15, 2016 at Dongdaemun Design Plaza. It was hosted by Leeteuk, Eric Nam and Hwang Jae-keun.

Award	Winner(s)
Style Icon	Girls' Generation, G-Dragon, Song Joong-ki, Ha Ji-won, Li Yifeng, Song Seung-heon, Lee Jung-jae, Lee Hanee, Yoo Ah-in, Park Bo-gum
Asia Digital Star	Girls' Generation
Awesome Asian Choice Award	Shinee
Awesome Wannabe	f(x)
Awesome Swagger	Jessi, Lee Dong-hwi
Awesome Spotlight	Kwon Yul
Awesome Teen	Kim Yoo-jung
Awesome K-Style	Winner
Awesome Rising Star	Kim Go-eun
Awesome Syndrome	Kim Seol-hyun
Awesome Iconic Model	Soo Joo

== See also ==
- List of fashion awards
