= Intimate Enemies (2015 film) =

- Theatrical poster
- Hangul: 나의 절친 악당들
- Hanja: 나의 切親 惡黨들
- RR: Naui jeolchin akdangdeul
- MR: Naŭi chŏlch'in aktangdŭl
- Directed by: Im Sang-soo
- Written by: Im Sang-soo
- Produced by: Lee Nam-hee; Seo Jeong-hoon
- Starring: Ryoo Seung-bum; Go Joon-hee
- Cinematography: Kim Young-min
- Edited by: Lee Eun-soo
- Music by: Kim Hong-jib
- Production companies: 20th Century Fox; Fox International Productions
- Distributed by: 20th Century Fox Korea
- Release date: June 25, 2015
- Running time: 109 minutes
- Country: South Korea
- Language: Korean
- Box office: US$906,136

Intimate Enemies (Korean: 나의 절친 악당들; RR: Naui jeolchin akdangdeul) is a 2015 South Korean film written and directed by Im Sang-soo.

== Plot ==
Tow truck driver Na-mi, corporate intern Ji-noo, African worker Yakubu and his South Korean wife Jung-sook discover bags full of cash at the site of a car crash, which is actually the slush fund of a conglomerate president. They initially pocket the money, but when the president sends ruthless criminals after them, they decide to use it to mete out revenge on corrupt corporations.

== Cast ==
- Ryoo Seung-bum as Ji-noo
- Go Joon-hee as Na-mi
- Ryu Hyun-kyung as Jung-sook
- Sam Okyere as Yakubu
- Kim Eung-soo as In-soo
- Jung Won-joong as Sang-ho
- Yang Ik-june as Eumbuki
- Kim Hyung-gyu as Chang-joon
- Youn Yuh-jung as Yeo-jung (cameo)
- Kim Joo-hyuk as Chairman (cameo)
- Kim C (cameo)
- Moon Ji-ae (cameo)
- Chang Kiha & The Faces (cameo)
