= Die Bad =

- Korean film poster for Die Bad
- Hangul: 죽거나 혹은 나쁘거나
- Hanja: 죽거나 或은 나쁘거나
- RR: Jukgeona hogeun nappeugeona
- MR: Chukkŏna hogŭn nappŭgŏna
- Directed by: Ryoo Seung-wan
- Written by: Ryoo Seung-wan
- Produced by: Kim Sun-guk; Seung Heung-chan
- Starring: Ryoo Seung-wan; Park Sung-bin; Ryoo Seung-bum; Bae Jung-shik
- Cinematography: Jo Yong-gyu; Choi Young-hwan
- Edited by: Kang Myeong-hwan
- Music by: Kim Dong-kyu; Kim Sung-hyun
- Distributed by: CNP Entertainment
- Release date: October 12, 2000 (Pusan International Film Festival)
- Running time: 98 minutes
- Country: South Korea
- Language: Korean
- Budget: US$261,000

Die Bad (Korean: 죽거나 혹은 나쁘거나) is a 2000 South Korean film. It was the debut film of director Ryoo Seung-wan and starred the director and his brother Ryoo Seung-bum along with Park Sung-bin and Bae Jung-shik. The film consists of four distinct parts that were originally created as short films. The parts are connected through the main story of the protagonist Sung-bin's descent into a life of crime.

== Plot ==
The first of the film's four parts is titled Rumble. The events start with two groups of rival teenagers hanging out in a bar, playing pool. They end up fighting and the main character Park Sung-bin accidentally kills another youth. He is thrown to prison for the next seven years.

The second part is titled Nightmare after the dreams Sung-bin still has about the man he killed. Sung-bin is trying to get back on track after being released from prison. He manages to get a job in a garage with the help of his brother, but his father still seems to loathe him for his past misdeeds. Eventually Sung-bin ends up saving a local crime boss, Kim Tae-hoon from a brutal beating and gets a job from him.

The next segment, Modern Man, intermixes fake documentary style interviews with a long fight between Kim Tae-hoon and Suk-hwan, an old friend of Sung-bin who was with him on the night that Sung-bin killed the man. Suk-hwan is now a police officer and his part of the interview tells about his job fighting crime while Kim Tae-hoon's interview segments show him speaking about his career in crime.

The last, longest segment is titled Die Bad. Sung-bin is taking control of his own group after Kim Tae-hoon is taken to prison. Sung-bin recruits a gang of youths, including Suk-hwan's brother, to serve as knife fodder in largely meaningless fights. In the end, Suk-hwan confronts and kills Sung-bin, but his brother is also killed.

== American remake ==
A Hollywood remake is currently in development. Universal Studios bought the remake rights and in November 2008, it was announced that director Marc Forster was attached to direct. It will be produced by Foster and his producing partner Brad Simpson at their Apparatus Productions along with Vertigo Entertainment's Roy Lee and Overnight Productions' Doug Davison and Rick Schwartz.

Screenwriter Brad Ingelsby was hired to write the screenplay. Ingelsby made a name for himself in March 2008 by selling his debut spec script The Low Dweller to Relativity Media for $650,000 against $1.1 million. That project has Leonardo DiCaprio attached to produce and possibly star through his Appian Way Productions and has Ridley Scott attached to produce through his Scott Free Productions.

As of January 2011, there is currently no movement on the Die Bad remake.
