= The Suicide Forecast =

2011 South Korean comedy-drama film directed by Jo Jin-mo

- Film poster
- Hangul: 수상한 고객들
- Hanja: 殊常한 顧客들
- RR: Susanghan gogaekdeul
- MR: Susanghan kogaektŭl
- Directed by: Jo Jin-mo
- Written by: Yoo Sung-hyub
- Produced by: Park Mae-hee
- Starring: Ryoo Seung-bum; Seo Ji-hye; Sung Dong-il; Park Chul-min; Jung Sun-kyung; Im Joo-hwan; Younha
- Cinematography: Choi Sang-mook
- Edited by: Shin Min-kyung
- Music by: Kim Hyeong-seok
- Production company: Mays Entertainment
- Distributed by: CJ Entertainment
- Release date: April 1, 2011
- Running time: 124 minutes
- Country: South Korea
- Language: Korean
- Box office: US$7,295,261

The Suicide Forecast (Korean: 수상한 고객들; lit. 'Suspicious Customers') is a 2011 South Korean comedy-drama film. It is Jo Jin-mo's directorial debut.

== Plot ==
Baseball player-turned-insurance salesman Byung-woo (Ryoo Seung-bum) is seen as the cocky ace of his company until one of his clients commits suicide. The police suspect him of aiding and abetting the suicide, which almost jeopardizes Byung-woo's career. Anxious to ensure it won't happen again, he gets in touch with his previous clients. Particularly those who seem the type to commit suicide.

During his quest to turn their lives around for the better, Byung-woo reunites with a lonely husband (Park Chul-min), a debt-ridden lounge singer (Younha), a homeless young man (Im Joo-hwan), and a widowed mother (Jung Sun-kyung).

== Cast ==
- Ryoo Seung-bum as Bae Byung-woo
- Seo Ji-hye as Lee Hye-in
- Sung Dong-il as Manager Park Jin-seok
- Park Chul-min as Oh Sang-yeol
- Jung Sun-kyung as Choi Bok-soon
- Im Joo-hwan as Kim Young-tak
- Younha as Ahn So-yeon
- Chae Bin as Jin-hee
- Lee Ji-eun as Seon-hee
- Lee Joon-ha as Mi-hee
- Oh Eun-chan as Ok-dong
- Sungha Jung as Ahn Hyeok
- Hong So-hee as Kim Young-mi
- Kim Byeong-chun as Homeless guy Park
- Choi Il-hwa as Hwang Woo-cheol
