= Scandal Makers =

2008 South Korean film

- Theatrical poster
- Hangul: 과속 스캔들
- Hanja: 過速스캔들
- Lit.: Speedy Scandal
- RR: Gwasok seukaendeul
- MR: Kwasok sŭk'aendŭl
- Directed by: Kang Hyeong-cheol
- Written by: Kang Hyeong-cheol
- Produced by: Ahn Byeong-ki; Sin Hye-yeon
- Starring: Cha Tae-hyun; Park Bo-young; Wang Seok-hyeon
- Cinematography: Kim Jun-young
- Edited by: Nam Na-yeong
- Music by: Kim Jun-seok
- Production companies: Toilet Pictures; DCG Plus
- Distributed by: Lotte Entertainment
- Release date: 3 December 2008
- Running time: 108 minutes
- Country: South Korea
- Language: Korean
- Box office: US$47.9 million

Scandal Makers (Korean: 과속스캔들) is a 2008 South Korean comedy-drama film written and directed by Kang Hyeong-cheol and starring Cha Tae-hyun, Park Bo-young and Wang Seok-hyeon. This was director Kang's first film and the highest grossing Korean film of the year.

== Plot ==
Former teen idol Nam Hyeon-soo (Cha Tae-hyun) is now in his thirties and works as a radio DJ. A young woman named Hwang Jeong-nam (Park Bo-young) sends stories about her life as a single mother to the radio station Hyeon-soo works at, telling him she will meet her father. He then finds out that he's her father when she shows up at his apartment with her son Ki-dong (Wang Seok-hyeon). She tells him that her real name is Jae-in and that her mother was Hyeon-soo's first love Jeong-nam. Hyeon-soo doesn't believe it at first, so they undergo a DNA test and the results confirm that they're related. Jae-in dreams of performing on stage as a singer, but Hyeon-soo fears that if she does, their paternity scandal might get out. Because of Jae-in's rising popularity, Ki-dong's father Park Sang-yoon (Im Ji-kyu) finds her. They meet and chat, with Sang-yoon initially under the mistaken assumption that Jae-in is romantically involved with Hyeon-soo. When Ki-dong goes missing at Jae-in's performance, Hyeon-soo realizes that he care for his daughter and grandson. After news about his daughter and grandson got leaked, he wasn't faced with damage to his career due to taking responsibility for them in the first place, low popularity, and news about a disgraced film star beating up a scandal gossip journalist overshadowing Hyeon-soo's revelation. With encouragement from Ki-Dong's kindergarten teacher, he changes his image to a responsible older man, which is warmly received by everyone. At a Christmas recital, Sang-yoon reconciles with Jae-in and Ki-Dong, rekindling their love for each other.

== Cast ==
- Cha Tae-hyun as Nam Hyeon-soo
  - Cha Soo-chan, Cha Tae-hyun's son and first child, appeared as a cameo at the last scene of the film. He was one year old at the time of filming.
- Park Bo-young as Hwang Jeong-nam/Hwang Jae-in, Hyeon-soo's daughter
- Wang Seok-hyeon as Hwang Ki-dong, Jae-in's son
- Im Ji-kyu as Park Sang-yoon, Jae-in's first love and Ki-dong's birth father
- Hwang Woo-seul-hye as Kindergarten teacher/Granny
- Im Seung-dae as Bong Pil-joong, entertainment reporter
- Jeong Won-joong as Bureau director
- Kim Ki-bang as Director
- Park Yeong-seo as Assistant director
- Sung Ji-ru as Lee Chang-hoon (cameo)
- Ko Jun as Commercial film director

== Release ==
Scandal Makers was released in South Korea on 3 December 2008 and topped the box office on its opening weekend with 473,725 admissions. It continued to chart well finishing with over 8 million tickets sold becoming the highest grossing Korean film of 2008. he second highest grosser was The Good, The Bad, The Weird with 6.6 million tickets, then The Chaser with roughly 5 million tickets sold.

== Awards and nominations ==
Year	Award	Category	Recipient	Result
2008	Cine21 Awards	New Actress of the Year	Park Bo-young	Won
2009	1st KMDb(Korean Movie Database) Choice Awards	Best Director	Kang Hyeong-cheol	Won
2009	6th Max Movie Awards	Best Actor	Cha Tae-hyun	Won
2009	6th Max Movie Awards	Best New Actress	Park Bo-young	Won
2009	45th Baeksang Arts Awards	Best Film	Scandal Makers	Nominated
2009	45th Baeksang Arts Awards	Best New Actress	Park Bo-young	Won
2009	45th Baeksang Arts Awards	Best New Director	Kang Hyeong-cheol	Nominated
2009	45th Baeksang Arts Awards	Best Screenplay	Kang Hyeong-cheol	Won
2009	45th Baeksang Arts Awards	Most Popular Actor (Film)	Cha Tae-hyun	Nominated
2009	45th Baeksang Arts Awards	Most Popular Actress (Film)	Park Bo-young	Won
2009	11th Udine Far East Film Festival	Audience Award (2nd place)	Kang Hyeong-cheol	Won
2009	2nd Korea Junior Star Awards	Grand Prize (Film category)	Park Bo-young	Won
2009	2nd Korea Junior Star Awards	Grand Prize	Wang Seok-hyeon	Won
2009	17th Chunsa Film Art Awards	Best New Actress	Park Bo-young	Nominated
2009	17th Chunsa Film Art Awards	Best Young Actor	Wang Seok-hyeon	Won
2009	18th Buil Film Awards	Best New Actress	Park Bo-young	Nominated
2009	12th Shanghai International Film Festival	Best Film (Asian New Talent Award)	Kang Hyeong-cheol	Won
2009	3rd Mnet 20's Choice Awards	HOT Movie Star - Female	Park Bo-young	Nominated
2009	3rd Mnet 20's Choice Awards	HOT New Star	Wang Seok-hyeon	Nominated
2009	3rd Mnet 20's Choice Awards	HOT Boom Up Song - Super Man	Scandal Makers	Nominated
2009	3rd Mnet 20's Choice Awards	HOT Boom Up Song - Perhaps That	Park Bo-young	Nominated
2009	46th Grand Bell Awards	Best New Actress	Park Bo-young	Nominated
2009	46th Grand Bell Awards	Best Editing	Nam Na-yeong	Nominated
2009	46th Grand Bell Awards	Best Lighting	Lee Sung-jae	Nominated
2009	46th Grand Bell Awards	Best Music	Kim Jun-seok	Nominated
2009	46th Grand Bell Awards	Popularity Award	Cha Tae-hyun	Nominated
2009	46th Grand Bell Awards	Popularity Award	Park Bo-young	Won
2009	29th Korean Association of Film Critics Awards	Best New Director	Kang Hyeong-cheol	Won
2009	29th Korean Association of Film Critics Awards	Best New Actress	Park Bo-young	Won
2009	30th Blue Dragon Film Awards	Best New Actress	Park Bo-young	Won
2009	30th Blue Dragon Film Awards	Best New Director	Kang Hyeong-cheol	Won
2009	30th Blue Dragon Film Awards	Best Music	Kim Jun-seok	Nominated
2009	17th Korean Culture and Entertainment Awards	Best New Actress (Film)	Park Bo-young	Won
2009	5th University Film Festival of Korea Awards	Best New Actress	Park Bo-young	Won
2009	32nd Golden Cinematography Awards	Best New Actress	Park Bo-young	Won
2009	32nd Golden Cinematography Awards	Best New Cinematographer	Kim Jun-young	Won
2009	12th Director's Cut Awards	Best New Actress	Park Bo-young	Won

== Remakes ==
- By March 2, 2009, Barry Sonnenfeld was set to direct and produce the American remake of Scandal Makers, with June Lee producing through Moho Film.
- A Chinese remake titled Scandal Maker, directed by Ahn Byeong-ki and starring Tong Dawei and Michelle Chen was released in China on November 11, 2016.
- A Vietnamese remake titled Ông ngoại tuổi 30 was released on March 30, 2018.
- An Indonesian remake titled Scandal Makers was released on Amazon Prime Video on January 19, 2023.
