= Filmmaker R&K =

South Korean film production company

- Native name: 주식회사 외유내강
- Romanized name: Filmmaker R&K
- Industry: Entertainment; Mass media; Production
- Founded: May 4, 2005
- Founder: Ryoo Seung-wan and Kang Hye-jung
- Headquarters: 5th floor, 56 Godeok-ro, Gangdong-gu, Seoul, South Korea
- Area served: South Korea
- Key people: Kang Hye-jung (Chairman)
- Website: filmrnk.com

Filmmaker R&K (Korean: 외유내강; Hanja: 外柔內剛; RR: Oeyunaegang) is a film production company based in Seoul, South Korea. Established in 2005, by Kang Hye-jung and Ryoo Seung-wan. Its notable works mostly directed by Ryoo Seung-wan such as Veteran (2015), The Battleship Island (2017), Escape from Mogadishu (2021) and Smugglers (2023). They also have other projects from other directors such as Exit (2019), Hostage: Missing Celebrity (2021).

== History ==
=== Establishment ===
Director Ryoo Seung-wan and Kang Hye-jeong coined the name Filmmaker R&K (Korean: 외유내강; Hanja: 外柔內剛; RR: Oeyunaegang) since they made their first short film together in 1996. The company was named after both of their surnames. Its Chinese characters have a meaning of being soft on the outside and strong on the inside, but it also represents Ryoo Seung-wan on the outside and Kang Hye-jung on the inside.

Filmmaker R&K formally established on May 4, 2005. Director Ryoo Seung-wan and Kang Hye-jeong used the bonus that Ryoo received for film Arahan as capital for the company's establishment. Kang has been the CEO since the company's establishment. Director Ryoo Seung-wan focused on directing films, Kang took charge of the overall production aspects.

=== Film production ===
Filmmaker R&K first film production after its establishment was The City of Violence (2006), a South Korean action thriller film co-written and directed by Ryoo Seung-wan, who stars in the film opposite action director and longtime collaborator Jung Doo-hong. Their second film, Dachimawa Lee, was released in South Korea on August 13, 2008. The movie was based on an internet version of "Tachima and Lee" that had gained 1.2 million views in 2000. Despite the popularity of the internet version, the theatrical release in 2008 failed to attract audiences and performed poorly at the box office. By September 2008, the film had only garnered a total of 629,591 admissions and grossed US$3,715,997.

The company return to success with The Unjust. It was critical acclaim for its gripping narrative, action scenes, social commentary, and stellar performances by Hwang Jung-min and Ryoo Seung-beom. It was a box office hit, selling over 2.7 millions tickets and ranking in the top ten for year.

Furthermore, it was followed by The Berlin File, This espionage thriller follows a North Korean spy betrayed during a weapons deal. To prepare for the film, Ryoo Seung-wan met with North Korean defectors and filmed the documentary Spies for Korean broadcaster MBC. The film, shot in Europe, focuses on South Korean agents uncovering North Korea's secrets and explores the emotional toll of espionage. Despite becoming the highest-grossing Korean action film, attracting 13.41 million viewers, it barely broke even due to its high budget of 5.9 billion won. This experience led them to recognize the need to target younger audiences and make more cost-effective films in the future.

In 2015, they released the action film Veteran. The film tells the story of a ruthless third-generation business tycoon pursued by a detective investigating a truck driver's mysterious injuries. Despite its modest budget of ₩6 billion, Veteran became a huge success in the South Korean box office, with 13.3 million admissions and earning US$89.7 million. It stands as the biggest hit of Kang's career and ranks as the 5th all-time highest-grossing film in Korean cinema history. The film brought Kang significant success and established her reputation as one of the leading female film producers in her 40s.

Their next project was The Battleship Island, set on Hashima Island, an outlying island abandoned by Japan off the coast of Nagasaki, where countless Koreans were drafted into forced labor during World War II. The film follows a group of American OSS agents and Korean independence fighters on a mission to evacuate a key Korean figure from the island. The film's total production cost was 25 billion won.

Initially, Filmmaker R&K primarily focused on producing director Ryoo Seung-wan's films. However, over time, the company has expanded its efforts to discover new directors. In 2017, Filmmaker R&K established a joint production system with Film K starting with The Battleship Island. Followed by On Your Wedding Day and Svaha: The Sixth Finger. Due to commercial success of Svaha: The Sixth Finger and Exit, CEO Kang won the 'Female Filmmaker of the Year' award at The 2019 Women's Film Festival, hosted by the Women Filmmakers Association.

Also in 2019, filmmaker R&K released the action comedy film Exit, written and directed by Lee Sang-geun as his first feature film debut, and starring Jo Jong-suk and Im Yoon-ah. Exit also marks Im Yoon-ah's first leading role in a film and is also the second film in her acting career after appearing as a supporting role in Confidential Assignment in 2017. The story follows a man trying to reconnect with an old crush, but they end up fleeing from a mysterious gas threatening Seoul district. Exit first premiered in South Korea on July 31, 2019. It was South Korea's third most-watched domestic film of the year, as it sold more than 9.4 a million admissions domestically. It was also a worldwide box office success, earning over US$69.5 a million.

In 2021, director Ryoo Seung-wan's Escape from Mogadishu and Hwang Jung-min's Hostage, which were released in July and August, were released one after another at three-week intervals as works produced by Filmmaker R&K. Kang produced Escape from Mogadishu, a film based on real events of the Somali Civil War in the 1990s. It depicted details of perilous escape attempt made by North and South Korean embassy personnel stranded during the conflict. The film made with production cost of ₩24 a billion was entirely shot in Morocco. It was selected as the South Korean entry for the Best International Feature Film at the 94th Academy Awards.

== Filmography ==
=== Short film ===
Short film credits
Year	Title		Director	Ref.
Year	English	Korean	Director	Ref.
1996	Sutda	섰다 - 디지털 단편 옴니버스 프로젝트 이공(異共)	Kim Eui-suk	
1996	Transmutated Head	변질헤드	Ryoo Seung-wan	
1999	Rumble	패싸움	Ryoo Seung-wan	
1999	Our Contemporaries	현대인	Ryoo Seung-wan	
2000	Dachimawa Lee	다찌마와 LEE	Ryoo Seung-wan	
2006	Hey Man short film from If You Were Me 2	남자니까 아시잖아요?	Ryoo Seung-wan	
2009	Come Visit Korea KTO mini-movie: Korean food; Shopping; Korean Wave; Sophisticated culture	한국 놀러오세요: 한국의 음식; 쇼핑; 한류; 세련된 문화	Ryoo Seung-wan	
2009	Timeless MotoKlassic short film	타임리스	Ryoo Seung-wan	
2011	Time MBC Documentary	타임	Ryoo Seung-wan	
2014	One Summer Night	인생은 새옹지마	Kim Tae-yong	

=== Feature film ===
Filmmaking credits
Year	Title		Director	Ref.
Year	English	Korean	Director	Ref.
2000	Die Bad	죽거나 혹은 나쁘거나	Ryoo Seung-wan	
2002	No Blood No Tears	피도 눈물도 없이	Ryoo Seung-wan	
2004	Arahan	아라한 장풍대작전	Ryoo Seung-wan	
2005	Crying Fist	주먹이 운다	Ryoo Seung-wan	
2006	The City of Violence	짝패	Ryoo Seung-wan	
2008	Dachimawa Lee	다찌마와 리: 악인이여 지옥행 급행열차를 타라!	Ryoo Seung-wan	
2010	Troubleshooter	해결사	Kwon Hyuk-jae	
2010	The Unjust	부당거래	Ryoo Seung-wan	
2013	The Berlin File	베를린	Ryoo Seung-wan	
2014	Mad Sad Bad	신촌좀비만화	Ryoo Seung-wan; Han Ji-seung; Kim Tae-yong	
2015	Veteran	베테랑	Ryoo Seung-wan	
2016	Misbehavior	여교사	Kim Tae-yong	
2017	The Battleship Island	군함도	Ryoo Seung-wan	
2017	On Your Wedding Day	너의 결혼식	Lee Seok-geun	
2019	Svaha: The Sixth Finger	사바하	Jang Jae-hyun	
2019	Exit	엑시트	Lee Sang Geun	
2019	Start-Up	시동	Choi Jeong-yeol	
2021	Escape from Mogadishu	모가디슈	Ryoo Seung-wan	
2021	Hostage: Missing Celebrity	인질	Pil Kam-sung	
2023	Smugglers	밀수	Ryoo Seung-wan	
2024	Dr. Cheon and Lost Talisman	천박사 퇴마 연구소: 설경의 비밀	Kim Seong-sik	
2024	I, the Executioner	베테랑 2	Ryoo Seung-wan	
2026	Humint	휴민트	Ryoo Seung-wan	

== Accolades ==
Awards and nominations
Award	Year	Category	Recipient(s)	Result	Ref.
10th Asian Film Awards	2016	Best Film	Veteran	Nominated	
52nd Baeksang Arts Awards	2016	Best Film	Veteran	Nominated	
56th Baeksang Arts Awards	2020	Best Film	Exit	Nominated	
58th Baeksang Arts Awards	2022	Grand Prize – Film	Escape from Mogadishu	Won	
58th Baeksang Arts Awards	2022	Best Film	Escape from Mogadishu	Won	
36th Blue Dragon Film Awards	2015	Best Film	Veteran	Nominated	
40th Blue Dragon Film Awards	2019	Best Film	Exit	Nominated	
42nd Blue Dragon Film Awards	2021	Best Film	Escape from Mogadishu	Won	
42nd Blue Dragon Film Awards	2021	Audience Choice Award for Most Popular Film	Escape from Mogadishu	Won	
42nd Blue Dragon Film Awards	2021	Best Film	Hostage: Missing Celebrity	Nominated	
44th Blue Dragon Film Awards	2023	Best Film	Smugglers	Won	
25th Buil Film Awards	2016	Best Film	Veteran	Won	
30th Buil Film Awards	2021	Best Film	Escape from Mogadishu	Won	
32nd Buil Film Awards	2023	Best Film	Smugglers	Nominated	
Fantasporto	2021	Best Orient Express Film	Escape from Mogadishu	Won	
22nd Far East Film Festival	2020	White Mulberry Award as Best First Film	Exit	Won	
52nd Grand Bell Awards	2015	Best Film	Veteran	Nominated	
59th Grand Bell Awards	2023	Best Film	Smugglers	Nominated	
35th Korean Association of Film Critics Awards	2015	Critics' Top 10 Films of the Year	Veteran	Shortlisted	
35th Korean Association of Film Critics Awards	2015	Best Film	Veteran	Nominated	
37th Korean Association of Film Critics Awards	2017	Critics' Top 10 Films of the Year	The Battleship Island	Shortlisted	
39th Korean Association of Film Critics Awards	2019	Critics' Top 10 Films of the Year	Exit	Shortlisted	
8th Korean Film Writers Association Awards	2021	Best Film	Escape from Mogadishu	Won	
11th Max Movie Awards	2016	Best Film	Veteran	Won	
1st The Seoul Awards	2017	Best Film	The Battleship Island	Nominated	
48th Sitges Film Festival	2015	Casa Asia Award (Asia Focus - Best Film)	Veteran	Won	
50th Sitges Film Festival	2017	Best Feature-length Film	The Battleship Island	Won	

== See also ==
- Ryoo Seung-wan
