= Kim Young-in =

South Korean actor and stuntman (1940–2026)

Kim Young-in (Korean:김영인; 9 April 1940 – 4 January 2026) was a South Korean actor and stuntman.

== Life and career ==
Kim Young-in was born in Yangpyeong on 9 April 1940. Throughout his career, he was featured in a number of feature films, including No Blood No Tears (2002), Arahan (2004), and Dachimawa Lee (2008).

In 2006, he was awarded a Daejong Award.

Kim died on 4 January 2026, at the age of 85.
