= Dr. Cheon and Lost Talisman =

2023 South Korean film

- Theatrical release poster
- Hangul: 천박사 퇴마 연구소: 설경의 비밀
- Hanja: 千博士退魔硏究所: 雪景의 祕密
- Lit.: Chun Doctor's Exorcism Lab: The Secret of Snow Scenery
- RR: Cheonbaksa toema yeonguso: seolgyeongui bimil
- MR: Ch'ŏnbaksa t'oema yŏn'guso: sŏlgyŏngŭi pimil
- Directed by: Kim Seong-sik
- Screenplay by: Park Joong-seop
- Based on: Possessed by Fresh and Kim Hong-tae
- Produced by: Kang Hye-jung; Jo Seong-min; Ryoo Seung-wan
- Starring: Gang Dong-won; Huh Joon-ho; Esom; Lee Dong-hwi; Kim Jong-soo
- Cinematography: Yang Hyun-suk
- Edited by: Lee Kang-hee
- Music by: Nene Kang
- Production company: Filmmaker R&K
- Distributed by: CJ Entertainment
- Release date: September 27, 2023
- Running time: 98 minutes
- Country: South Korea
- Language: Korean
- Box office: US$14.6 million

Dr. Cheon and Lost Talisman (Korean: 천박사 퇴마 연구소: 설경의 비밀) is a 2023 South Korean dark fantasy action film directed by Kim Seong-sik, based on the webtoon Possessed by Fresh and illustrated by Kim Hong. It stars Gang Dong-won, Huh Joon-ho, Esom, Lee Dong-hwi, and Kim Jong-soo. The film depicts a fake exorcist who cannot see ghosts but solves the case with ghost-like insight, and is commissioned for a powerful possession case.

It was released theatrically on September 27, 2023, coinciding with Chuseok.

== Plot ==
Dr. Cheon and his assistant In-bae arrive at a wealthy household to perform their usual exorcism scam. As always, Cheon shakes his bell (which never rings) and delivers a convincing performance to complete the job and secure a golden toad statue. Back at the office, they store their ritual items and mark the location on a map. A desperate woman named Yoo-kyung offers them 50 million won upfront to investigate her haunted hometown of Goecheon. Despite initial hesitation, the money convinces Cheon to accept. Upon arriving, they find the village shrouded in unnatural fog, full of funeral homes, and a deeply eerie atmosphere. At Yoo-kyung's home, her terrified younger sister is locked away, seemingly possessed.

Cheon tries to reassure everyone by shaking the bell again, but this time, it rings for the first time ever. Shocked, Cheon repeats the motion and the bell continues to ring, confirming a real spiritual presence. When he confronts the sister, the entity inside lashes out violently, breaking the bell and activating the broken half of a sacred sword called the Chilseonggeom. The possessed girl attacks Cheon, and the spirit attempts to jump into Yoo-kyung, but is repelled by a mysterious force. Cheon uses the sword to destroy the ghost, and in doing so, shatters a bamboo spirit vessel belonging to the dark shaman Beom-cheon, who now realizes Yoo-kyung is a threat.

Beom-cheon's followers report the incident and plan to retrieve Yoo-kyung's spiritual eyes, which allow her to see reversed spells and spirits. Cheon reflects on his past: he inherited spiritual talent from his grandfather, a shaman who once tried to save Cheon's missing younger brother using a talisman. However, Beom-cheon interrupted the ritual, resulting in the deaths of both the grandfather and the brother. Determined to stop Beom-cheon, Cheon became a self-taught shaman. Later, when Beom-cheon tries to steal Yoo-kyung's eyes by possessing her, Cheon intervenes, driving the spirit out and recovering another talisman from Yoo-kyung's sister's pillow.

Cheon seeks help from a divine shamaness to locate the other half of the magical trap called Seolgyeong. With Yoo-kyung's spiritual sight, they identify reversed spell markings, which allow them to burn a talisman tied to Beom-cheon. The shamaness reveals that Beom-cheon has long hunted powerful shamans to gain divine power and that Cheon's grandfather nearly succeeded in sealing him. With directions to Mount Yongwol where the remaining Seolgyeong is hidden, Cheon and Yoo-kyung head off, while Beom-cheon learns of their movement and lays a trap.

Cheon retrieves the remaining half of the Seolgyeong despite powerful illusions. With the sword fully restored, he battles Beom-cheon but is soon overpowered and loses the weapon. Though Cheon is wounded, reinforcements arrive to distract Beomcheon. Temporarily blinded and delayed by explosions, Beom-cheon is finally sealed by the completed Seolgyeong's chains, which extract his soul. The ritual is completed when the sealing script is read in reverse, erasing Beom-cheon's spirit for good. In-bae offers Yoo-kyung a spot on their team, and Cheon nods in agreement.

== Cast ==
- Gang Dong-won as Dr. Cheon
- Huh Joon-ho as Beom-cheon
- Esom as Oh Yoo-kyung
- Lee Dong-hwi as Kang In-bae
- Kim Jong-soo as Mr. Hwang
- Park So-yi as Oh Yoo-min
- Yoon Byeong-hee as Hwarang
- Joo Bo-bi as Jeom-bachi
- Park Kyung-hye as Sa-wol
- Kim Won-hae as Dr. Cheon's grandfather
- Park Jeong-min as Fairy shaman
- Cho Yi-hyun as Mr. Park's daughter
- Lee Jung-eun as Mr. Park's wife
- Park Myung-hoon as Mr. Park
- Jisoo as a Korean traditional fairy

== Production ==
Gang Dong-won, Lee Dong-hwi and Esom confirmed their appearance in July 2022. The all main cast was confirmed on September 19, 2022.

Filming began on September 14, 2022.

== Reception ==
As of October 14, 2023, the film has grossed US$13,152,259 at the local box office and accumulated 1,831,185 admissions from 796 screens.
