= I, the Executioner (2024 film) =

2024 film by Ryoo Seung-wan

- Theatrical release poster
- Hangul: 베테랑2
- Lit.: Veteran 2
- RR: Beterang2
- MR: Pet'erang2
- Directed by: Ryoo Seung-wan
- Written by: Lee Won-jae; Ryoo Seung-wan
- Produced by: Kang Hye-jung; Jo Seong-min; Ryoo Seung-wan
- Starring: Hwang Jung-min; Jung Hae-in
- Cinematography: Choi Young-hwan
- Edited by: Bae Youn-tae
- Music by: Chang Kiha
- Production company: Filmmaker R&K
- Distributed by: CJ Entertainment
- Release dates: May 21, 2024 (Cannes); September 13, 2024 (South Korea)
- Running time: 118 minutes
- Country: South Korea
- Language: Korean
- Box office: US$53.5 million

I, the Executioner (Korean: 베테랑2; RR: Beterang 2; lit. 'Veteran 2') is a 2024 South Korean action-thriller film co-written, directed and produced by Ryoo Seung-wan, starring Hwang Jung-min and Jung Hae-in. The sequel to Ryoo's 2015 film Veteran, it follows veteran detective Seo Do-cheol teaming up with a young detective, Park Sun-woo, in a high-stakes pursuit of a serial killer.

The film premiered in the Midnight Screenings section at the 77th Cannes Film Festival on May 21, 2024. It was released theatrically in South Korea on September 13, 2024.

== Plot ==
Detective Seo Do-cheol's Violent Crimes Investigation Unit raids an illegal gambling den. Soon after, a viral video surfaces showing a masked killer executing a disgraced art professor who raped a female student, leading to her suicide. The police realize this is part of a disturbing pattern. Each victim was a perpetrator in a past crime, killed in the same way their victim had suffered. As similar killings emerge, the police suspect a serial killer is targeting those who escaped justice.

A popular YouTuber named "Editor Justice" covers the murders, dubbing the killer "Haechi" and framing them as a vigilante exposing flaws in the legal system. Public support for Haechi grows after more videos go viral, including a warning that ex-convict Jeon Seok-woo, who killed a pregnant woman in a drunk driving incident, is the next target. Despite public outrage, Seo's team is ordered to protect Jeon. They succeed in moving him to a safe house, where rookie officer Park Sun-woo stands out for his strength, politeness, and suspicious behavior.

Tensions rise as Sun-woo grows increasingly involved with the team. He meticulously secures the safe house, but Jeon escapes and is later found dead. Meanwhile, a staged confrontation on live stream at Namsan goes wrong when Sun-woo brutally assaults a man he wrongly believes to be Haechi. The man turns out to be an actor hired by Editor Justice for content. As the real investigation continues, suspicion begins to fall on Sun-woo, especially after more signs point to someone with martial arts skills and knowledge of police operations.

Another suspect, Min Kang-hoon, a traumatized former soldier, emerges after killing a biker gang with his car. After a violent chase and rooftop fight, Kang-hoon is nearly killed by Sun-woo using an extreme jiu-jitsu hold, but the police intervene just in time. Though Kang-hoon is arrested, forensic evidence suggests Jeon was killed by someone using leg-based choking techniques. Seo recalls a video of Sun-woo using that same move. He begins to suspect that Haechi has been in his team all along.

As Seo investigates, Sun-woo kidnaps Editor Justice and sets a trap, forcing Seo to choose between saving his son or another innocent woman. The detective team rescues Seo's son just in time. Seo then confronts Sun-woo in a brutal final showdown, where Sun-woo nearly kills him before Seo turns the tables. As paramedics arrive, Seo revives him, insisting he live to face justice. Later, Seo shares a quiet moment with his son, acknowledging his past emotional absence.

A post credit scene reveals that Sun-woo has escaped while being transported to the prison.

== Cast ==
- Hwang Jung-min as Seo Do-cheol
- Jung Hae-in as Park Sun-woo
- Oh Dal-su as Captain Oh
- Oh Dae-hwan as Detective Wang
- Jang Yoon-ju as Detective Bong
- Kim Si-hoo as Detective Yoon
- Jin Kyung as Lee Joo-yeon
- Shin Seung-hwan as Park Seung-hwan ("Editor Justice")
- Jung Man-sik as Jeon Seok-woo
- Kwon Hae-hyo as Kang Soo-dae
- Kim Jae-hwa as Buti Samo
- Kim Won-hae as Former team leader
- Ahn Bo-hyun as Min Kang-hoon
- Huh Joon-ho as Kang Hang-jo
- Lee Bong-ryun as Announcer
- Oh Yoon-hong as Current Affairs critic
- Jo Kwan-woo as Chi-hoon's father

== Production ==
In September 2015, a month after the release of his film Veteran, Ryoo Seung-wan and production company Filmmaker R&K confirmed that they agreed to make a sequel, which they originally expected to be made within two to three years. In December 2021, Ryoo revealed that he had finished the script for the sequel and planned shoot it at the end of the following year.

In July 2022, FNC Entertainment announced that Jung Hae-in was offered a role in the film, succeeding Yoo Ah-in as the antagonist. In December 2022, Jung Hae-in was confirmed to have joined the cast, which would include Hwang Jung-min, Oh Dal-su, Jang Yoon-ju, Oh Dae-hwan and Kim Shi-hoo reprising their roles from the original film.

Principal photography began in December 2022. Filming took place at the Daejeon City Hall on January 8, 2023. In July 2023, Ryoo announced that the project recently completed filming and had entered post-production. The film is produced by Filmmaker R&K, which Ryoo owns with wife Kang Hye-jung.

== Release ==
I, the Executioner was selected to be screened out of competition in the Midnight Screenings section at the 77th Cannes Film Festival, where it had its world premiere on May 21, 2024. The film was also screened in the Special Presentations section at the Toronto International Film Festival on September 5, 2024. CJ ENM released the film in South Korea on September 13, 2024.

== Reception ==
=== Box office ===
I, the Executioner opened in South Korea on September 13, 2024. It grossed US$30 million from more than 4 million admissions over its first six days of release. As of 1 November 2024, the film has grossed US$53.7 million at the local box office and accumulated 7,248,584 admissions.

=== Critical response ===
On the review aggregator website Rotten Tomatoes, 100% of 15 critics' reviews are positive, with an average rating of 7.5/10.

== Accolades ==
Award ceremony	Year	Category	Nominee / Work	Result	Ref.
Baeksang Arts Awards	2025	Best Supporting Actor	Jung Hae-in	Nominated	
Baeksang Arts Awards	2025	Best Technical Achievement	Yoo Sang-seop, Jang Han-seung (Stunt)	Nominated	
Blue Dragon Film Awards	2024	Best Film	I, the Executioner	Nominated	
Blue Dragon Film Awards	2024	Best Director	Ryu Seung-wan	Nominated	
Blue Dragon Film Awards	2024	Best Supporting Actor	Jung Hae-in	Won	
Blue Dragon Film Awards	2024	Best Editing	Bae Yeon-tae	Nominated	
Blue Dragon Film Awards	2024	Best Cinematography and Lighting	Choi Yeong-hwan, Lee Jae-hyuk	Nominated	
Blue Dragon Film Awards	2024	Best Music	Chang Kiha	Nominated	
Blue Dragon Film Awards	2024	Technical Award	Yoo Sang-seob (Stunt)	Won	
Buil Film Awards	2025	Best Supporting Actor	Jung Hae-in	Nominated	
