= Blue Dragon Film Award for Best Film =

Blue Dragon Film Awards in South Korea

- Awarded for: Best Film
- Country: South Korea
- Presented by: Blue Dragon Film Awards
- First award: 1963
- Winner: No Other Choice
- Website: www.blueaward.co.kr

The Blue Dragon Film Award for Best Film (청룡영화상 최우수 작품상) is one of the awards that is presented annually at the Blue Dragon Film Awards by Sports Chosun, which is typically held at the end of the year.

== Winners and nominees ==
Table key
‡	Indicates the winner

=== 1960s ===
Year	Winner	Original title	Director(s)
1963 (1st)	Bloodline ‡	혈맥	Kim Soo-yong
1964 (2nd)	Extra Human Being ‡	잉여인간	Yu Hyun-mok
1965 (3rd)	Sad Story of Self Supporting Child ‡	저 하늘에도 슬픔이	Kim Soo-yong
1966 (4th)	Market ‡	시장	Lee Man-hee
1967 (5th)	Flame in the Valley ‡	산불	Kim Soo-yong
1969 (6th)	Descendents of Cain ‡	카인의 후예	Yu Hyun-mok

=== 1970s ===
Year	Winner	Original title	Director(s)
1970 (7th)	The Old Jar Craftsman ‡	독짓는 늙은이	Choi Ha-won
1971 (8th)	When a Woman Breaks Her Jewel Box ‡	옥합을 깨뜨릴 때	Kim Soo-yong
1972 (9th)	Oyster Village ‡	석화촌	Jung Jin-woo
1973 (10th)	The Three-Day Reign ‡	삼일천하	Shin Sang-ok

=== 1990s ===
Year	Winner and nominees	Original title	Director(s)
1990 (11th)	Black Republic ‡	그들도 우리처럼	Park Kwang-su
1990 (11th)	Nambugun: North Korean Partisan in South Korea	남부군	Chung Ji-young
1990 (11th)	Rooster	수탉	Shin Seung-soo
1990 (11th)	General's Son	장군의 아들	Im Kwon-taek
1991 (12th)	Death Song ‡	사의 찬미	Kim Ho-sun
1991 (12th)	Fly High Run Far	개벽	Im Kwon-taek
1991 (12th)	Who saw the dragon's toenails?	누가 용의 발톱을 보았는가	Kang Woo-suk
1991 (12th)	Berlin Report	베를린리포트	Park Kwang-su
1991 (12th)	Silver Stallion	은마는 오지 않는다	Jang Kil-su
1992 (13th)	Our Twisted Hero ‡	우리들의 일그러진 영웅	Park Jong-won
1992 (13th)	Marriage Story	결혼 이야기	Kim Ui-seok
1992 (13th)	The Road to Racetrack	경마장 가는 길	Jang Sun-woo
1992 (13th)	White Badge	하얀 전쟁	Chung Ji-young
1993 (14th)	Sopyonje ‡	서편제	Im Kwon-taek
1993 (14th)	Blue In You	그대 안의 블루	Lee Hyun-seung
1993 (14th)	I Will Survive	살어리랏다	Yoon Sam-yook
1993 (14th)	First Love	첫사랑	Lee Myung-se
1993 (14th)	Hwa-Om-Kyung	화엄경	Jang Sun-woo
1994 (15th)	The Taebaek Mountains ‡	태백산맥	Im Kwon-taek
1994 (15th)	Two Cops	투캅스	Kang Woo-suk
1994 (15th)	To You from Me	너에게 나를 보낸다	Jang Sun-woo
1994 (15th)	Life and Death of the Hollywood Kid	헐리우드 키드의 생애	Chung Ji-young
1994 (15th)	The Rules Of The Game	게임의 법칙	Jang Hyun-soo
1995 (16th)	A Single Spark ‡	아름다운 청년 전태일	Park Kwang-su
1995 (16th)	The Terrorist	테러리스트	Kim Young-bin
1995 (16th)	A Hot Roof	개같은 날의 오후	Lee Min-yong
1995 (16th)	Dr. Bong	닥터 봉	Lee Kwang-hoon
1995 (16th)	Go Alone Like Musso's Horn	무소의 뿔처럼 혼자서 가라	Oh Byeong-cheol
1996 (17th)	Festival ‡	축제	Im Kwon-taek
1996 (17th)	A Petal	꽃잎	Jang Sun-woo
1996 (17th)	The Day A Pig Fell Into The Well	돼지가 우물에 빠진 날	Hong Sang-soo
1996 (17th)	The Gingko Bed	은행나무 침대	Kang Je-gyu
1996 (17th)	Farewell My Darling	학생부군신위	Park Chul-soo
1997 (18th)	Green Fish ‡	초록물고기	Lee Chang-dong
1997 (18th)	Ghost Mamma	고스트 맘마	Han Ji-seung
1997 (18th)	Beat	비트	Kim Sung-su
1997 (18th)	The Contact	접속	Chang Yoon-hyun
1997 (18th)	Downfall	창	Im Kwon-taek
1998 (19th)	Christmas in August ‡	8월의 크리스마스	Hur Jin-ho
1998 (19th)	The Power of Kangwon Province	강원도의 힘	Hong Sang-soo
1998 (19th)	Bedroom And Courtroom	생과부 위자료 청구 소송	Kang Woo-suk
1998 (19th)	A Promise	약속	Kim Yoo-jin
1998 (19th)	An Affair	정사	E J-yong
1999 (20th)	Nowhere to Hide ‡	인정사정 볼 것 없다	Lee Myung-se
1999 (20th)	Rainbow Trout	송어	Park Jong-won
1999 (20th)	Shiri	쉬리	Kang Je-gyu
1999 (20th)	Phantom, The Submarine	유령	Min Byung-Chun
1999 (20th)	Tell Me Something	텔 미 썸딩	Chang Yoon-hyun

=== 2000s ===
Year	Winner and nominees	Original title	Director(s)
2000 (21st)	Joint Security Area ‡	공동경비구역 JSA	Park Chan-wook
2000 (21st)	Peppermint Candy	박하사탕	Lee Chang-dong
2000 (21st)	The Foul King	반칙왕	Kim Jee-woon
2000 (21st)	Virgin Stripped Bare by Her Bachelors	오! 수정	Hong Sang-soo
2000 (21st)	Chunhyang	춘향뎐	Im Kwon-taek
2001 (22nd)	One Fine Spring Day ‡	봄날은 간다	Hur Jin-ho
2001 (22nd)	Musa	무사	Kim Sung-su
2001 (22nd)	Bungee Jumping of Their Own	번지 점프를 하다	Kim Dae-seung
2001 (22nd)	Failan	파이란	Song Hae-sung
2001 (22nd)	Friend	친구	Kwak Kyung-taek
2002 (23rd)	Chi-hwa-seon ‡	취화선	Im Kwon-taek
2002 (23rd)	Public Enemy	공공의 적	Kang Woo-suk
2002 (23rd)	Sympathy for Mr. Vengeance	복수는 나의 것	Park Chan-wook
2002 (23rd)	On the Occasion of Remembering the Turning Gate	생활의 발견	Hong Sang-soo
2002 (23rd)	The Way Home	집으로...	Lee Jeong-hyang
2003 (24th)	Spring, Summer, Fall, Winter... and Spring ‡	봄 여름 가을 겨울 그리고 봄	Kim Ki-duk
2003 (24th)	A Good Lawyer's Wife	바람난 가족	Im Sang-soo
2003 (24th)	Memories of Murder	살인의 추억	Bong Joon-ho
2003 (24th)	Untold Scandal	스캔들 - 조선남녀상열지사	E J-yong
2003 (24th)	Oldboy	올드보이	Park Chan-wook
2004 (25th)	Silmido ‡	실미도	Kang Woo-suk
2004 (25th)	Once Upon a Time in High School	말죽거리 잔혹사	Yoo Ha
2004 (25th)	The Big Swindle	범죄의 재구성	Choi Dong-hoon
2004 (25th)	My Mother, the Mermaid	인어 공주	Park Heung-sik
2004 (25th)	Taegukgi	태극기 휘날리며	Kang Je-gyu
2005 (26th)	Sympathy for Lady Vengeance ‡	친절한 금자씨	Park Chan-wook
2005 (26th)	You Are My Sunshine	너는 내 운명	Park Jin-pyo
2005 (26th)	Marathon	말아톤	Jeong Yoon-cheol
2005 (26th)	Welcome to Dongmakgol	웰컴 투 동막골	Park Kwang-hyun
2005 (26th)	Blood Rain	혈의 누	Kim Dae-seung
2006 (27th)	The Host ‡	괴물	Bong Joon-ho
2006 (27th)	Family Ties	가족의 탄생	Kim Tae-yong
2006 (27th)	Radio Star	라디오 스타	Lee Joon-ik
2006 (27th)	The King and the Clown	왕의 남자	Lee Joon-ik
2006 (27th)	Tazza: The High Rollers	타짜	Choi Dong-hoon
2007 (28th)	The Show Must Go On ‡	우아한 세계	Han Jae-rim
2007 (28th)	200 Pounds Beauty	미녀는 괴로워	Kim Yong-hwa
2007 (28th)	Voice of a Murderer	그놈 목소리	Park Jin-pyo
2007 (28th)	May 18	화려한 휴가	Kim Ji-hoon
2007 (28th)	Happiness	행복	Hur Jin-ho
2008 (29th)	Forever the Moment ‡	우리 생애 최고의 순간	Yim Soon-rye
2008 (29th)	Seven Days	세븐 데이즈	Won Shin-yun
2008 (29th)	The Good, the Bad, the Weird	좋은 놈, 나쁜 놈, 이상한 놈	Kim Jee-woon
2008 (29th)	The Chaser	추격자	Na Hong-jin
2008 (29th)	Crossing	크로싱	Kim Tae-kyun
2009 (30th)	Mother ‡	마더	Bong Joon-ho
2009 (30th)	Take Off	국가대표	Kim Yong-hwa
2009 (30th)	Good Morning President	굿모닝 프레지던트	Jang Jin
2009 (30th)	Thirst	박쥐	Park Chan-wook
2009 (30th)	Tidal Wave	해운대	Yoon Je-kyoon

=== 2010s ===
Year	Winner and nominees	Original title	Director(s)
2010 (31st)	Secret Reunion ‡	의형제	Jang Hoon
2010 (31st)	The Man from Nowhere	아저씨	Lee Jeong-beom
2010 (31st)	Moss	이끼	Kang Woo-suk
2010 (31st)	Jeon Woo-chi: The Taoist Wizard	전우치	Choi Dong-hoon
2010 (31st)	The Housemaid	하녀	Im Sang-soo
2011 (32nd)	The Unjust ‡	부당거래	Ryoo Seung-wan
2011 (32nd)	The Front Line	고지전	Jang Hoon
2011 (32nd)	Silenced	도가니	Hwang Dong-hyuk
2011 (32nd)	Sunny	써니	Kang Hyeong-cheol
2011 (32nd)	War of the Arrows	최종병기 활	Kim Han-min
2012 (33rd)	Pietà ‡	피에타	Kim Ki-duk
2012 (33rd)	Masquerade	광해, 왕이 된 남자	Choo Chang-min
2012 (33rd)	The Thieves	도둑들	Choi Dong-hoon
2012 (33rd)	Nameless Gangster: Rules of the Time	범죄와의 전쟁 : 나쁜놈들 전성시대	Yoon Jong-bin
2012 (33rd)	Unbowed	부러진 화살	Chung Ji-young
2013 (34th)	Hope ‡	소원	Lee Joon-ik
2013 (34th)	The Face Reader	관상	Han Jae-rim
2013 (34th)	The Berlin File	베를린	Ryoo Seung-wan
2013 (34th)	Snowpiercer	설국열차	Bong Joon-ho
2013 (34th)	New World	신세계	Park Hoon-jung
2014 (35th)	The Attorney ‡	변호인	Yang Woo-suk
2014 (35th)	Miss Granny	수상한 그녀	Hwang Dong-hyuk
2014 (35th)	A Hard Day	끝까지 간다	Kim Seong-hun
2014 (35th)	The Admiral: Roaring Currents	명량	Kim Han-min
2014 (35th)	Whistle Blower	제보자	Yim Soon-rye
2015 (36th)	Assassination ‡	암살	Choi Dong-hoon
2015 (36th)	Ode to My Father	국제시장	Yoon Je-kyoon
2015 (36th)	The Classified File	극비수사	Kwak Kyung-taek
2015 (36th)	Veteran	베테랑	Ryoo Seung-wan
2015 (36th)	The Throne	사도	Lee Joon-ik
2016 (37th)	Inside Men ‡	내부자들	Woo Min-ho
2016 (37th)	The Wailing	곡성	Na Hong-jin
2016 (37th)	Dongju: The Portrait of a Poet	동주	Lee Joon-ik
2016 (37th)	The Age of Shadows	밀정	Kim Jee-woon
2016 (37th)	Train to Busan	부산행	Yeon Sang-ho
2016 (37th)	The Handmaiden	아가씨	Park Chan-wook
2017 (38th)	A Taxi Driver ‡	택시 운전사	Jang Hoon
2017 (38th)	The Fortress	남한산성	Hwang Dong-hyuk
2017 (38th)	The King	더 킹	Han Jae-rim
2017 (38th)	Anarchist from Colony	박열	Lee Joon-ik
2017 (38th)	The Merciless	불한당: 나쁜 놈들의 세상	Byun Sung-hyun
2018 (39th)	1987: When the Day Comes ‡	1987	Jang Joon-hwan
2018 (39th)	The Spy Gone North	공작	Yoon Jong-bin
2018 (39th)	Little Forest	리틀 포레스트	Yim Soon-rye
2018 (39th)	Along with the Gods: The Two Worlds	신과함께-죄와 벌	Kim Yong-hwa
2018 (39th)	Dark Figure of Crime	암수살인	Kim Tae-kyun
2019 (40th)	Parasite ‡	기생충	Bong Joon-ho
2019 (40th)	Extreme Job	극한직업	Lee Byeong-heon
2019 (40th)	House of Hummingbird	벌새	Kim Bora
2019 (40th)	Swing Kids	스윙키즈	Kang Hyeong-cheol
2019 (40th)	Exit	엑시트	Lee Sang-geun

=== 2020s ===
Year	Winner and nominees	Original title	Director(s)
2020 (41st)
2020 (41st)	The Man Standing Next ‡	남산의 부장들	Woo Min-ho
2020 (41st)	Voice of Silence	소리도 없이	Hong Eui-jeong
2020 (41st)	Moving On	남매의 여름밤	Yoon Dan-bi
2020 (41st)	Moonlit Winter	윤희에게	Lim Dae-hyung
2020 (41st)	Kim Ji-young: Born 1982	82년생 김지영	Kim Do-young
2021 (42nd)	Escape from Mogadishu ‡	모가디슈	Ryoo Seung-wan
2021 (42nd)	The Day I Died: Unclosed Case	내가 죽던 날	Park Ji-wan
2021 (42nd)	Space Sweepers	승리호	Jo Sung-hee
2021 (42nd)	Hostage: Missing Celebrity	인질	Pil Kam-sung
2021 (42nd)	The Book of Fish	자산어보	Lee Joon-ik
2022 (43rd)	Decision to Leave ‡	헤어질 결심	Park Chan-wook
2022 (43rd)	Hunt	헌트	Lee Jung-jae
2022 (43rd)	Kingmaker	킹메이커	Byun Sung-Hyun
2022 (43rd)	Hansan: Rising Dragon	한산: 용의 출현	Kim Han-min
2022 (43rd)	Broker	브로커	Hirokazu Kore-eda
2023 (44th)
2023 (44th)	Smugglers ‡	밀수	Ryoo Seung-wan
2023 (44th)	Concrete Utopia	콘크리트 유토피아	Um Tae-hwa
2023 (44th)	Next Sohee	다음 소희	Jung Ju-ri
2023 (44th)	The Night Owl	올빼미	Ahn Tae-jin
2023 (44th)	Cobweb	거미집	Kim Jee-woon
2024 (45th)
2024 (45th)	12.12: The Day ‡	서울의 봄	Kim Sung-su
2024 (45th)	I, the Executioner	베테랑2	Ryoo Seung-wan
2024 (45th)	Exhuma	파묘	Jang Jae-hyun
2024 (45th)	Past Lives		Celine Song
2024 (45th)	Handsome Guys	핸섬가이즈	Nam Dong-hyeop
2025 (46th)
2025 (46th)	No Other Choice ‡	어쩔수가없다	Park Chan-wook
2025 (46th)	The Ugly	얼굴	Yeon Sang-ho
2025 (46th)	My Daughter is a Zombie	좀비딸	Pil Gam-sung
2025 (46th)	The Old Woman with the Knife	파과	Min Kyu-dong
2025 (46th)	Harbin	하얼빈	Woo Min-ho

== General references ==
- "Winners and nominees lists". Blue Dragon Film Awards (in Korean). Archived from the original on January 27, 2022.
- "Blue Dragon Film Awards". Naver (in Korean). Archived from the original on December 8, 2020.
