= Svaha: The Sixth Finger =

- Theatrical release poster
- Hangul: 사바하
- Hanja: 娑婆訶
- RR: Sabaha
- MR: Sabaha
- Directed by: Jang Jae-hyun
- Written by: Jang Jae-hyun
- Produced by: Kang Hye-jung; Ryoo Seung-wan
- Starring: Lee Jung-jae; Park Jeong-min; Lee Jae-in; Jung Jin-young; Jin Seon-kyu; Lee David
- Cinematography: Kim Tae-soo
- Edited by: Jeong Byeong-jin
- Music by: Kim Tae-seong
- Production companies: Filmmaker R&K filmK
- Distributed by: CJ Entertainment; Netflix
- Release date: February 20, 2019
- Running time: 122 minutes
- Country: South Korea
- Language: Korean
- Box office: US$17.7 million

Svaha: The Sixth Finger (Korean: 사바하; RR: Sabaha) is a 2019 South Korean mystery thriller film directed by Jang Jae-hyun, starring Lee Jung-jae, Park Jeong-min, Lee Jae-in, Jung Jin-young, Jin Seon-kyu and Lee David. The film was number one at the box office in its opening week, with a strong 840,000 sales and collected 1.18 million viewers in its first five days. It depicts a mystery involving a Buddhist sect while posing questions about faith in general.

== Plot ==
Lee Geum-hwa and her twin sister are born in 1999. Geum-hwa's sister fed on her leg in utero and Geum-hwa is born with a deformed leg. The sister, who is severely deformed and referred to as "the thing", was not expected to survive, and her birth is not registered. Their mother dies shortly after and their father commits suicide soon after that. In the present day, Geum-hwa now lives in a remote village with her grandparents, who had recently moved there and raise dogs for a living. The sister, who has survived, is kept hidden from the public eye, locked up in a shed in the backyard. Some of the locals with the help of a mudang investigate the farm because the local livestock had been acting up. When they investigate the shed at night, snakes crawl out of it and bite them.

Meanwhile, Pastor Park Ung-jae, a Protestant minister whose work involves the investigation and sensationalized exposure of cults and frauds (in order to generate publicity and donations) rather than leading a congregation, has been hired to investigate a mysterious group called Dongbanggyo or "Deer Mountain Sect" that has been operating in Gangwon-do. He has already sent his assistant Joseph to infiltrate the group, but Joseph has been unable to find anything useful; they meet up at a convenience store near a Dongbanggyo branch in Taebaek that Joseph has infiltrated to discuss what Joseph has found. Joseph hasn't noticed anything unusual about the group, which to him appears to be an esoteric Buddhist sect with no apparent funding difficulties, but instead of worshipping the Buddha or a bodhisattva as might be expected, practitioners at both locations (Taebaek and Jeongseon) Joseph has visited worship "Generals". Elsewhere in Gangwon-do, the police investigate the body of a girl found entombed in concrete. A police investigator, Chief Hwang, assesses that the girl was recently murdered and that she was young, probably a middle-schooler at best.

Pastor Park meets with several high-ranking Buddhist monks to discuss his investigation of the Dongbanggyo sect. While the monks are initially skeptical of Pastor Park's suspicion of the sect Monk Hae-an, a hubae of Pastor Park, suggests that being proactive is not a bad policy; after the meeting, Hae-an asks Park for his dossier on Dongbanggyo, in particular a copy of their scripture. If it is determined that Dongbanggyo is using an unapproved/non-canon Buddhist scripture or interpretation thereof, then Buddhist leadership have grounds to take action against the group.

At night, an individual called Gwangmok visits his friend Kim Cheol-jin, a construction truck driver who admits to him that he has failed "Father." He tells Gwangmok that the dead children come to visit him at night, and he expresses concerns that something has gone wrong. Calling him Jiguk, Gwangmok reassures him that they are fighting evil, and that he must die before he is captured; Gwangmok assures him that he will continue their work.

The following day, Joseph, with his phone secretly open so Pastor Park can listen in on a discussion on Dongbanggyo's scriptures from his car outside, sneaks into the administrative offices of the Taebaek Dongbanggyo branch. The police arrive to investigate due to the discovery of talismans during the dead girl's autopsy. Expecting to find nothing, they send the practitioners home but do not discover Joseph. When informed that the dead girl has been traced to Kim Cheol-jin via the construction company that employs him, the police leave to intercept him. The police set up an ambush in the evening at the apartment Kim Cheol-jin shares with his mother. Kim Cheol-jin arrives at his building, but instead of going to his apartment he heads to the roof and calls his mother, telling her goodbye and that he is doing the work of heaven. He then jumps off the roof, hanging himself before the police can stop him.

Pastor Park meets up with Monk Hae-an at Hae-an's office at Geumgang University. Hae-an explains to him that he has deduced from the pictures Park sent him that there are four Dongbanggyo branches - two more than Park knew about - centered around a central temple. Hae-an explains that the "generals" portrayed in images at the various Dongbanggyo branches are actually the Four Heavenly Kings, guarding the four cardinal directions (north, south, east, west), with each Dongbanggyo branch represented by one of the kings. Pastor Park and Joseph return to the Taebaek Dongbanggyo branch at night and do their own investigation. They discover a hidden room that appears to have been recently occupied and take a copy of the Dongbanggyo scripture from the room.

The following day, Gwangmok is given a dossier on Geum-hwa by one of the Dongbanggyo members from Taebaek. Elsewhere, Pastor Park learns from a friend in the police force that Kim Cheol-jin was a juvenile convicted murderer. Gwangmok begins to stake out Geum-hwa. Like Kim Cheol-jin, Gwangmok also has nightmares about dead girls, but they end with a woman consoling him with a lullaby.

Having reviewed the Dongbanggyo scripture Park sent to him, Hae-an explains to Pastor Park and Joseph that while the Dongbanggyo scripture from the Jiguk site in Taebaek is mostly canon, containing edits of early sutras and tantra, it contains a sutra that he has never seen before, written in very symbolic language and resembling a prophecy about demons fighting gods. Pastor Park learns that this non-canon/unapproved section, titled the "Hangma" sutra, was written by a Master (Pung-sa) Kim; he finds an old article about a Tibetan Buddhist master Nechung Tenpa wanting to meet this Master Kim Je-seok, the founder of Dongbanggyo. During a meeting with the head monk "the Octopus," Park learns that Kim Je-seok, born in 1899, made a significant donation to a youth detention centre about 20 years ago, but that after 1985 he disappeared to write the Hangma sutra and was almost never seen except by his closest disciples. He also learns from that detention center's records that Kim Je-seok adopted four juvenile delinquents who killed their fathers; one of the boys was Kim Cheol-jin. Park reasons that three of the boys are dead based on drawings showing them as deities with halos. The remaining deity is called Gwangmok.

Gwangmok is at Geum-hwa's place and plans to strangle her. However, birds begin to fly through the window which confuses Gwangmok. He then goes to the shed where the sister is. The sister grabs his leg from under the door and Gwangmok is frightened off. Gwangmok goes to the Dongbanggyo Residence and speaks with a youthful Henchman tending the grounds, who tells Gwangmok that the girl in the shed is "the snake" the prophecy warned about. Gwangmok meets with his "Father," who is dying. He recalls the Father giving him the moniker Gwangmok and saying that he is one of the stars who will protect the light.

Pastor Park speaks with Nechung Tenpa, who recounts an encounter he had in 1985 with the Master. He tells Park that the man has attained immortality and that he believes the Master is actually Maitreya. He saw the Master's twelve fingers. He says the Master is still alive despite being born in 1899. Park asks about the Donggonggyo scriptures which speak of a "snake" who will kill "the light." Tenpa says that the snake is the natural enemy of the Master. Tenpa said he delivered an oracle to the Master that his natural enemy will be born in the place where the Master was born in one hundred years and will turn out the light. Park asks Tenpa about the numbers in the scriptures but he was not able to assist. Park deduces that the cult founder Kim Je-seok is "the light," and the four "guardians" have been killing all the young girls born in 1999 at Yeongwol, Kim Je-seok's hometown. He realizes the numbers in the scripture were actually birth registration numbers for all the girls.

Meanwhile, Gwangmok has kidnapped Geum-hwa and is preparing to kill her. She asks why she has to die. He says she is born evil but death is not the end. Geum-hwa tells Gwangmok about her sister and asks him to kill her also so she can be reborn as a human in the next life. Gwangmok finds the sister and prepares to strangle her. She has shed her hideous appearance and has taken on the pose of a Buddha. She tells him that she has been waiting for him and that she is the one who consoles him in his nightmares after he sheds blood. She sings the same song to him as in his nightmares. She tells him to look for the mark (six fingers) on the person he calls Father and to kill him.

Gwangmok returns to the Residence and tells the Henchman what happened. He goes to check his dying Father's hand but he only has five fingers. The Henchman lures Gwangmok to a barn and shoots him. Park also attend the residence and is confused why the old man is dying. He hides and learns that the Henchman is actually Kim Je-seok and that the old man was just a disciple.

While driving the Henchman (now revealed as the cult founder Kim Je-seok) tells Gwangmok that he will soon die. He tells him the man he called Father was actually his disciple. He tells him he is the light and that Gwangmok is one of the stars that protect him. He tells him not be sad about the acts they committed. He tells him he has won the race against time and that there are things he must do for the world and offers for him to continue to serve. Gwangmok goes to strangle him and tells Kim that he is a predator who is desperate to live. The car eventually crashes. Both are pinned with fuel dripping onto them. Kim Je-seok is able to escape and starts to walk away. Gwangmok retrieves an object that the sister had given him. It turns out to be a lighter and he sets Kim Je-seok on fire killing him.

Geum-hwa who is still alive holds her sister while the sister passes away. Pastor Park and Joseph arrive at the scene of the crash and witness Kim Je-seok's death. Pastor Park comforts the dying Gwangmok, covering him with his coat. As the police arrive and Pastor Park Park and Joseph drive away, Pastor Park has a crisis of faith.

== Cast ==
- Lee Jung-jae as Pastor Park
- Park Jeong-min as Na-han (Gwangmok)
- Lee Jae-in as Lee Geum-hwa / "It"
- Jung Jin-young as Chief Hwang
- Jin Seon-kyu as Monk Hae-an
- Lee David as Joseph
- Yoo Ji-tae as Kim Je-seok
- Ji Seung-hyun as Kim Cheol-jin
- Min Tanaka as Nechung Tenpa
- Cha Sun-bae as Manager monk
- Hwang Jung-min as Deaconess Sim
- Lee Hang-na as Park Eun-hye
- Jung Dong-hwan as "Father," the unnamed disciple of Kim Je-seok
- Moon Chang-gil as Geum-hwa's grandfather
- Lee Joo-sil as Geum-hwa's mother
- Cha Rae-hyung as Detective Jo
- Oh Yoon-hong as Bodhisattva Yeon-hwa
- Kim Hong-pa as Prison governor
- Kim Geum-soon as Jecheon shaman
- Park Ji-hwan as Jang-seok
- Kim So-sook as Cheol-jin's mother
- Kwon Gwi-bin as Na-han's mother
- Moon Sook as Myung-hee
- Lee Dae-hyeon as Dr. Noh
- Bae Hae-sun as Autopsy doctor
- Yoon Kyung-ho as Cattle shed owner
- Jung Seo-in as Cattle shed owner's wife
- Baek Seung-chul as Geum-hwa's father
- Lee Sang-woo as Head monk

== Production ==
Principal photography began on November 19, 2017, and wrapped on April 9, 2018. The title Svaha was decided when a colleague of director Jang Jae-hyun recommended it. It is a term used in Buddhism when memorizing a certain series of events makes them "happen".

90% of the scenes were shot on location, despite the cold reaching 20 degrees below zero in some areas. The production team devoted 90% of shooting to an entire location of Gangwon-do province with a mountainous area in South Korea. Cinematographer Kim Tae-soo also created blue-based water as a base to create a cool-toned cinematic atmosphere while preserving the cold tones for the season of winter. The camera movements and shooting styles also emphasize expressing the tension, which later is increased by more close-ups in the second half of the film.

== Background ==
Although Buddhism and esotericism are the main focus in the film, there are also elements of Maitreya, Shichuan and references to the Christian Bible as well. For instance, when the twin sisters are born, there's a reference to the biblical brothers Esau and Jacob. Jacob is said to have come out of the womb with his twin brother's heel. In the movie, this is similar to when "It" survived in the womb by eating her twin's leg. There is also the reference to Massacre of the Innocents when, just like King Herod the Great, Kim Je-Seuk who killed all of the infants born in a certain place to get rid of an enemy predicted to defeat him.

== Release ==
The film released on February 20, 2019, attracted 190,000 viewers on the first day and was number one in the box office. On the second day, it exceeded 2 million viewers, in total bringing in around 2.19 million audience members. This brought in cumulative sales of 20,007,508,194 won which is around 16,481,474.98 U.S dollars. Actor Jeong Dong-hwan, played the role of Kim Je-seok who after gaining enlightenment, his body never grows old. But the film faced some backlash when used a photo of Independence activist Na Cheol for an earlier photo of the character Kim Je-seok. Na Cheol was an independence activist known as the godfather of the anti-Japanese independence movement founded in Daejong Gyo, before the National Order of Merit was started. There was also a protest from Sincheonji, a Christian movement, over some scenes from the trailer. They were concerned and said that the trailer for the film could damage the group's reputation.

== Awards and nominations ==
Awards	Category	Recipient	Result	Ref.
55th Baeksang Arts Awards	Best Film	Svaha: The Sixth Finger	Nominated	
55th Baeksang Arts Awards	Best Director	Jang Jae-hyun	Nominated	
55th Baeksang Arts Awards	Best New Actress	Lee Jae-in	Won	
56th Grand Bell Awards	Best Art Direction	Seo Seong-kyeong	Won	
56th Grand Bell Awards	Best Lighting	Jeon Young-sell	Won	
56th Grand Bell Awards	Best Director	Jang Jae-hyun	Nominated	
56th Grand Bell Awards	Best Screenplay	Jang Jae-hyun	Nominated	
56th Grand Bell Awards	Best New Actress	Lee Jae-in	Nominated	
56th Grand Bell Awards	Best Film Editing	Jeong Byeong-jin	Nominated	
56th Grand Bell Awards	Best Music	Kim Tae-seong	Nominated	
56th Grand Bell Awards	Technical Award	Son Seung-hyeon, Kim Shin-cheol (Visual Effects)	Nominated	
