= The Battleship Island =

2017 South Korean period action film

- Theatrical release poster
- Hangul: 군함도
- Hanja: 軍艦島
- RR: Gunhamdo
- MR: Kunhamdo
- Directed by: Ryoo Seung-wan
- Screenplay by: Ryoo Seung-wan
- Produced by: Cho Sung-min
- Starring: Hwang Jung-min; So Ji-sub; Song Joong-ki; Lee Jung-hyun; Kim Su-an
- Cinematography: Lee Mo-gae
- Edited by: Kim Jae-bum; Kim Sang-bum
- Music by: Bang Jun-seok; Justin Bieber
- Production company: Filmmaker R&K
- Distributed by: CJ Entertainment
- Release date: 26 July 2017
- Running time: 132 minutes
- Country: South Korea
- Languages: Korean; Japanese
- Budget: US$21 million
- Box office: US$47.3 million

The Battleship Island (Korean: 군함도; RR: Gunhamdo) is a 2017 South Korean period action drama film starring Hwang Jung-min, So Ji-sub, Song Joong-ki and Lee Jung-hyun. It is a Japanese occupation-era film about an attempted prison break from a forced labor camp on Hashima Island.

== Synopsis ==
Set during Imperial Japan's occupation of Korea during World War II, a group of over 400 Koreans endure harsh forced labor on Hashima Island and risk their lives to attempt a daring escape.

== Cast ==
=== Main ===
- Hwang Jung-min as Lee Kang-ok

A bandmaster at a hotel in Keijō (Seoul), who chooses to take his only daughter to Japan in order to keep her safe. But they get sent to the Hashima labor camp instead, and there he'll do anything that's asked of him, as long as he can protect his daughter.

- So Ji-sub as Choi Chil-sung

The best street fighter in Gyeongseong, a coarse man who constantly stirs up troubles in the labor camp. Under his harsh and rough exterior, he has a good heart.

- Song Joong-ki as Park Moo-young

A member of the Korean independence movement who infiltrates the island in order to rescue a fellow independence fighter being held captive there.

- Lee Jung-hyun as Oh Mal-nyeon

A comfort woman who gets moved to Hashima after going through endless troubles under Japanese occupation, but never loosens her strong grip on hope.

=== Supporting ===
- Kim Su-an as Lee So-hee

Lee Kang-ok's daughter. She was being captured by a Japanese general because of her talents in singing and dancing.

- Kim Bo-yoon as Joseon girl
- Kwon Han-sol as Joseon girl
- Ham Sung-min as Bok-jin's group
- Lee Geung-young as Yoon Hak-cheol
- Lee Jung-eun
- Yoon Kyung-ho as Dauber
- Bae Seung-cheol
- Jang Sung-bum
- Kim Jun-han
- Kim Won-hae
- Kim Ye-eun
- Bae Je-gi
- Kim Dong-young as a gambler.

== Production ==
Filming began June 17, 2016 in Cheongju, South Korea and finished on December 20, 2016. The film reunites Hwang Jung-min with Ryoo Seung-wan, who directed the 2015 hit movie Veteran starring Hwang. Production cost about five times more than the average locally produced film due to the massive lifelike sets. While the island provided the inspiration for the plot, The Battleship Island was not filmed on location. The sets were built in Chuncheon and were designed to resemble the conditions of Hashima Island's community and mines during the 1940s.

== Release ==
The Battleship Island was first promoted at the European Film Market in February 2017 and then at the Cannes Film Festival in May. As of June 2017, it has been sold to 113 countries, including North American countries as well as France, Italy, Russia, Turkey, Malaysia, Taiwan, Indonesia, Japan, Hong Kong, Singapore and Thailand. On June 16, 2017, an official press conference was held at the National Museum of Korea to launch the film.

The film was invited to compete at 2017 Sitges International Fantastic Film Festival of Catalonia in Spain. The film was shown in the Orbita section for introducing most notable films of the year and honouring a title chosen by the jury composed of audiences. This is the sixth film by director Ryoo Seung-wan to be selected for a screening at this film festival.

=== Special screenings ===
On July 25, 2017, a special pre-screening was held for foreign diplomats in South Korea.

On July 28, 2017, a special screening was held for UNESCO officials and diplomats in Paris at the headquarters of Metropolitan Filmexport. The aim was to raise awareness into the hidden history of Hashima Island and shed light on the harsh labour and living conditions imposed upon Koreans at the underground coal mining factory on the island during Japan's rule of Korea.

=== Box office ===
The film was released on 26 July 2017 in South Korea. According to the Korean Film Council, The Battleship Island created a new record with reaching 970,516 viewers on its opening night. During the first weekend (July 28 to 30) since the movie was released, an audience of 2.5 million was attracted. This resulted in box-office earnings of USD 18.57 million from 2,027 screens, representing 37.1% of total movie theaters in the country. This marked the first time in the country that a movie had been released on more than 2,000 screens, creating controversy over screen dominance by conglomerates.

Over 4 million tickets were sold in the first five days, earning USD 27.9 million in total and exceeding the production costs of approximately US$21 million.

In its second week of release, the film was surpassed by the historical action drama film A Taxi Driver. By the end of the eighth day since the film was released, it was playing at 1,108 venues for a total of 5.18 million viewers. The number of admissions surpassed 6 million on the 12th day of its run. As of September 26, or two months after opening in the box office, overall admission was 6.58 million.

== Reception ==
The Battleship Island holds a 67% approval rating by 15 reviewers on aggregator website Rotten Tomatoes with a weighted average of 4.3/5 and 6.3/10, respectively. On Metacritic, the film has a score of 60 out of 100 based on 4 critics, indicating "mixed or average reviews".

The New York Times noted that the film "vividly conveys the pain of a national wartime trauma whose scars clearly have not healed." Although some aspects of the violence and overly-theatrical storylines were criticized, critics have praised the camera work and Ryoo for his effective use of a large-scale action set.

== Awards and nominations ==
Award	Category	Recipient	Result	Ref.
1st The Seoul Awards	Best Film	The Battleship Island	Nominated	
1st The Seoul Awards	Best Actor	Hwang Jung-min	Nominated	
1st The Seoul Awards	Best Supporting Actress	Lee Jung-hyun	Won	
1st The Seoul Awards	Special Acting Award	Kim Su-an	Won	
Sitges Film Festival	Best Feature-length Film	The Battleship Island	Won	
26th Buil Film Awards	Best Supporting Actress	Kim Su-an	Won	
26th Buil Film Awards	Best Art Direction	Lee Hwo-kyoung	Won	
37th Korean Association of Film Critics Awards	Technical Award (art direction)	Lee Hwo-kyoung	Won	
37th Korean Association of Film Critics Awards	Top 10 Films	The Battleship Island	Won	
38th Blue Dragon Film Awards	Best Supporting Actress	Lee Jung-hyun	Nominated	
38th Blue Dragon Film Awards	Best Cinematography and Lighting	The Battleship Island	Nominated	
38th Blue Dragon Film Awards	Best Art Direction	The Battleship Island	Won	
38th Blue Dragon Film Awards	Best Technical Achievement - Visual Effects	The Battleship Island	Nominated	
38th Blue Dragon Film Awards	Popular Star Award	Kim Su-an	Won	
25th Korea Culture & Entertainment Awards	Top Excellence Award, Actor in Film	Lee Geung-young	Won	
25th Korea Culture & Entertainment Awards	Top Excellence Award, Actress in Film	Lee Jung-hyun	Won	
6th The Night of Stars-Korea Top Star Awards	Korea's Top Star (Film)	Lee Jung-hyun	Won	
6th The Night of Stars-Korea Top Star Awards	Popular Star (Film)	Kim Su-an	Won	
23rd Chunsa Film Art Awards	Best Director	Ryoo Seung-wan	Nominated	
23rd Chunsa Film Art Awards	Best Supporting Actress	Lee Jung-hyun	Nominated	
23rd Chunsa Film Art Awards	Best Supporting Actress	Kim Su-an	Nominated	
23rd Chunsa Film Art Awards	Technical Award	—N/a	Nominated	
54th Baeksang Arts Awards	Technical Award (Film)	Lee Hwo-kyoung	Nominated	

== Historical accuracy ==
Japanese conservative media, such as the Sankei Shimbun newspaper, attacked the film accusing it of distorting historic truth. In response, director Ryoo Seung-wan said "the film is a fact-based fiction" based on historical records as well as first hand testimony from survivors regarding their lack of payments, abusive treatment, and working conditions which lead to deaths of laborers from diseases, malnutrition, and accidents. The writer-director said the film was not made to stoke Korean nationalism or anti-Japanese sentiment but to show "how war can make man a monster".

In South Korea, there was criticism that the film reflected a '[pro-Japanese]' colonialist view of history (식민사관) because it reduced war crimes to cinematic entertainment, and it emphasized the acts of betrayal committed by Koreans on behalf of the Japanese-colonial government.

=== Japanese historical revisionism ===
In its application to UNESCO for World Heritage status for Hashima Island, Japan acknowledged that Korean and Chinese forced laborers were used there during World War II. The acknowledgement, which was only made after South Korea opposed the bid, stated "large number[s] of Koreans and others [...] were brought against their will and forced to work under harsh conditions in the 1940s at some of the sites [including Hashima island]". However, once Hashima Island was approved as a UNESCO World Heritage Site in July 2015, the Japanese reverted to whitewashing history. Two months later Fumio Kishida, then-Japanese Foreign Minister, contradicted the earlier acknowledgement that forced laborers were used at Hashima by saying that "[forced to work under harsh conditions] by the Japanese government representative did not mean forced labor". Although UNESCO's World Heritage Committee stipulated that a monitoring mechanism to measure the degree to which the victims of Hashima Island are remembered be a prerequisite for the successful bid, the island's official tourism website and tour program - operated by Nagasaki City - makes no mention of forced laborers and currently does not make any efforts to comply with UNESCO's requirement.
