= Troubleshooter (2010 film) =

2010 film by Kwon Hyuk-jae

- Theatrical release poster
- Hangul: 해결사
- RR: Haegyeolsa
- MR: Haegyŏlsa
- Directed by: Kwon Hyuk-jae
- Written by: Ryoo Seung-wan; Kwon Hyuk-jae
- Produced by: Ryoo Seung-wan; Kang Hye-jung
- Starring: Sul Kyung-gu; Lee Jung-jin; Oh Dal-su
- Cinematography: Jeong Seok-won
- Music by: Bang Jun-seok
- Production company: Filmmaker R&K
- Distributed by: Next Entertainment World
- Release date: September 9, 2010
- Running time: 99 minutes
- Country: South Korea
- Language: Korean
- Box office: US$12.5 million

Troubleshooter (Korean: 해결사; RR: Haegyeolsa) is a 2010 South Korean action drama film directed by Kwon Hyuk-jae, and starring Sul Kyung-gu, Lee Jung-jin, and Oh Dal-su. The film was released on September 9, 2010.

== Plot ==
Kang Tae-sik, a once-renowned detective now running a shabby private investigation agency, thinks he's taking on a routine infidelity case. But when he storms the scene, he finds a woman dead and suddenly becomes the prime suspect. Just when he is helplessly framed as the culprit, he gets a mysterious phone call. The caller offers a way out of the murder frame-up: kidnap someone.

With no time to catch his breath, Tae-sik finds himself hunted by the police, constantly surveilled and wiretapped by a mysterious figure who seems to know his every move, his past history, and even the people around him. On top of that, he discovers the person he's been ordered to kidnap holds the key to a high-profile national scandal. With the odds stacked against him, Tae-sik launches a counterattack against the mastermind pulling the strings.

== Cast ==
- Sul Kyung-gu as Kang Tae-sik
- Lee Jung-jin as Jang Pil-ho
- Oh Dal-su as Choi Sang-cheol
- Joo Jin-mo as Won Joo-bong
- Lee Sung-min as Yoon Dae-hee
- Moon Jeong-hee as Oh Kyung-shin
- Song Sae-byeok as Oh Jong-gyu
- Lee Yeong-hoon as Park Hyung-joon ("Psycho")
- Park Young-seo as Goo Bon-chi
- Jo Young-jin as Jo Hyeon-cheol
- Kim Hyang-gi as Kang Soo-jin, Tae-sik's daughter

== Production ==
Principal photography began in the second half of 2010 in Daejeon.

== Release ==
Troubleshooter premiered in South Korean theaters on September 9, 2010, distributed by Next Entertainment World.

== Reception ==
The film was released on September 9, 2010, on 498 screens. It opened at first place at the South Korean box office with 76,637 admissions.

The film has grossed US$10,065,024 from 1,843,371 admissions.
