= Kang Hye-jung (filmmaker) =

South Korean filmmaker (born 1970)

- Born: 1970 (age 55–56); South Korea
- Education: Department of Home Economics Education at Korea University
- Occupations: Filmmaker, producer
- Years active: 1995–present
- Employer: Filmmaker R&K
- Spouse: Ryoo Seung-wan (m. 1998)
- Children: 3
- Relatives: Ryoo Seung-bum (Brother in law)

Korean name
- Hangul: 강혜정
- RR: Gang Hyejeong
- MR: Kang Hyejŏng

Kang Hye-jung (Korean: 강혜정; born 1970) is a South Korean filmmaker and entertainment executive. She is the CEO of the film production house company Filmmaker R&K, which was established in 2005 with director Ryoo Seung-wan. Her notable works are mostly directed by Ryoo Seung-wan, like Veteran (2015), The Battleship Island (2017), Escape from Mogadishu (2021) and Smugglers (2023), as well as projects from other directors such as Exit (2019) and Hostage: Missing Celebrity (2021).

== Early life ==
Kang Hye-jung was born in 1970. Kang initially pursued a teaching career at her parents' request, enrolling in the Department of Home Economics Education at Korea University. After graduating in February 1993, she briefly worked as a teacher before realizing the profession was not her calling.

== Career ==
=== 1993 to 1994: Transitioning to film industry ===
During her time as a student activist in Korea University, Kang found the constant filming of demonstrations by the "Stone Light" film club cumbersome and showed little interest in the film industry. However, following her decision to leave teaching, she enrolled in a three-month workshop with the Independent Film Council's 5th batch in May 1993, paying a 300,000 won tuition fee. It was during this program that she met Ryoo Seung-wan, a former student from the 3rd batch serving as an assistant instructor. The two collaborated on her workshop film project and subsequently began dating.

Following the workshop, Kang sought feedback from film critic Kim Young-jin, who criticized their work harshly. Undeterred, Kang and Ryoo committed to a ten-year trial period in the film industry, resolving to change careers if they did not find success. Kang started her career small, by writing film leaflets at Korea Art Hall, while supporting herself by tutoring students. During this time, she also mentored Ryoo's younger brother, Ryoo Seung-bum, while he was in middle school.

=== 1995 to 2024: Career as film producer ===
In 1995, she joined a film company in Chungmuro, called "Movie Room" under CEO Joo Pil-ho and started promoting foreign movies. She was part of the production department for Lim Jong-jae's film Kill the Love. In 1996, She joined the film company Cinema Service during the production of Two Cops 3 where she worked film producer Kim Mi-hee. Kang served as the youngest member of the production department.

That same year, for the production of Ryoo's debut short film, Transmutated Head, they established their collaborative brand, as Oeyunaegang (Korean: 외유내강). The name is a direct play on their surnames: Oeyu sounds like Ryoo and Naegang incorporates her surname, Kang. Beyond the pun, the term is a Korean idiom describing a person who is "gentle on the outside but strong on the inside." At the time, the production was funded by Kang's personal savings and this early partnership laid the foundation for what would eventually become the film production company Filmmaker R&K.

Kang and Ryu married in 1997, and Kang continued her career. When producer Kim Mi-hee became co-CEO of Good Movies in 2000, Kang joined the production department as its youngest member. She began her career as a producer on Byun Young-joo's film Ardor. Despite her young age and lack of experience, Kang was committed to learning the industry. Kim Mi-hee encouraged her to understand every aspect of the field, leading Kang to take on tasks such as clearing sets and managing traffic. These experiences, including transporting heavy film cans on late-night buses, provided her with a deep appreciation for the human labor required in filmmaking.

In 2002, when Good Movies marketed Ryoo's film No Blood No Tears, Kang chose not to handle its promotion directly. She believed it was a strategic move to delegate the marketing to a colleague who could offer a more neutral perspective. In 2004, she served as the producer for Byun Young-joo's film Flying Boys, which marked her final project with the company. Kang resigned from her position in 2005 during her pregnancy with her third child.

=== 2005 to present: As producer and CEO of Filmmaker R&K ===
In 2004, Ryoo had a success with film Arahan. With the profit made from the film Kang and Ryoo decided to legally establish as Oeyunaegang (Korean: 외유내강) as a film production company with Filmmaker R&K as their official English name. Ryoo served as the creative lead and Kang managed the company as CEO and producer.

Following the birth of her third child, Kang produced the company's debut feature, The City of Violence (2006). However, the film's box office failure led to severe financial instability for the company. After defaulting on rent and facing eviction from their office, Kang was forced to relocate. During this period, the Yangsu-ri filming studio provided her with an empty room to serve as a temporary workspace. To stabilize her finances, Kang sold her home in Yangsu-ri, moved her family to Namyangju, and took a part-time position at the Korea Tourism Organization. She eventually secured a project producing tourism promotion shorts directed by Ryoo, using the earnings to settle her employees' outstanding salaries. This was followed by a commercial short film for the Motorola Classic 2G phone. Kang later served as the producer for Troubleshooter (2010), directed by newcomer Kwon Hyuk-jae. To support the project, Kang successfully secured a Memorandum of Understanding (MoU) with the city of Daejeon and the Daejeon Film Commission.

With an improved financial situation, Kang rented a new office for Filmmaking R&K. She and Ryoo returned to commercial success with The Unjust (2010), which sold over 2.7 million tickets and earned critical acclaim. She followed this with the high-budget espionage thriller The Berlin File (2013). Although it became a high-grossing action film, its narrow profit margin due to substantial production costs led Kang to prioritize more cost-effective projects and target younger demographics in future productions. In 2015, Kang produced the action film Veteran, which served as her career's milestone. With 13.3 million admissions, it remains one of the highest-grossing films in South Korean cinema history. The film's success established her reputation as one of the leading female film producers in the industry.

Under Kang's leadership, Filmmaker R&K expanded beyond Ryoo's filmography. In 2017, Filmmaker R&K established a joint production system with Film K starting with The Battleship Island, followed by On Your Wedding Day and Svaha: The Sixth Finger. This expansion continued with the 2019 action-comedy Exit, which became a massive commercial success with over 9.4 million admissions. For her work on Svaha: The Sixth Finger and Exit, Kang was honored as Female Filmmaker of the Year' at The 2019 Women's Film Festival, which was hosted by the Women Filmmakers Association.

== Personal life ==
In May 1993, Kang attended a three-month filmmaking workshop at the Independent Film Council, where she met Ryoo Seung-wan, who was working as a workshop assistant. Drawn to his passion for cinema, she began dating him after they collaborated on a project. Despite opposition from her father and her boss, Kim Mi-hee, Kang married Ryoo in 1997. The couple has three children: as of 2017, their eldest daughter was a high school senior, while their two sons were in eighth and sixth grade respectively.

== Filmography ==
Short film credits
| Year | Title | | Director | Credited as | | | Ref. |
| Year | English | Korean | Director | Investor | Producer | Planner | Ref. |
|---|---|---|---|---|---|---|---|
| 1996 | Sutda | 섰다 - 디지털 단편 옴니버스 프로젝트 이공(異共) | Kim Eui-suk | —N/a | Production Department | —N/a | |
| 1996 | Kill the Love | 그들만의 세상 | Im Jong-jae | —N/a | Production Department | —N/a | |
| 1997 | Blackjack | 블랙잭 | Chung Ji-young | —N/a | Production Department | —N/a | |
| 1998 | Two Cops III | 투캅스 3 | Kim Sang-jin | Other crew | —N/a | | |
| 1998 | Too Tired to Die | 투 타이어드 투 다이 | Chin Won-suk | Marketing | —N/a | | |
| 1999 | The Ring Virus | 링 (링 바이러스) | Kim Dong-bin | Marketing | —N/a | | |
| 1999 | Rainbow Trout | 송어 | Park Jong-won | —N/a | Production Department | —N/a | |
| 2000 | General Hospital, The Movie: 1000 Days | 종합병원 (천일동안) | Choi Youn-seok | Marketing | —N/a | | |
| 2001 | Last Present | 선물 | Oh Ki-wan | Marketing | —N/a | | |
| 2001 | Kick the Moon | 신라의 달밤 | Kim Sang-jin | Marketing | —N/a | | |
| 2002 | Ardor | 밀애 | Byun Young-joo | —N/a | Production Department | —N/a | |
| 2002 | No Blood No Tears | 피도 눈물도 없이 | Ryoo Seung-wan | Marketing | —N/a | | |
| 2002 | Fun Movie | 재밌는 영화 | Jang Kyu-sung | Marketing | —N/a | | |
| 2004 | He Was Cool | 그놈은 멋있었다 | Lee Hwan-kyung | Marketing | —N/a | | |
| 2004 | Flying Boys | 발레교습소 | Byun Young-joo | —N/a | Production Department | —N/a | |

== Accolades ==
=== Awards and nominations ===
| Award | Year | Category | Recipient(s) | Result | Ref. |
|---|---|---|---|---|---|
| 55th Baeksang Arts Awards | 2019 | Best Film | Svaha: The Sixth Finger | Nominated | |
| 56th Baeksang Arts Awards | 2020 | Best Film | Exit | Nominated | |
| Bechdel Day | 2024 | Bechdelian of the Year (Film Category) | Smugglers | Won | |
| 40th Blue Dragon Film Awards | 2019 | Best Picture | Exit | Nominated | |
| Cine21 Film Awards | 2019 | Best Producer | Svaha: The Sixth Finger | Won | |
| 22nd Far East Film Festival | 2020 | White Mulberry Award as Best First Film | Exit | Won | |
| 56th Grand Bell Awards | 2020 | Best Planning | Exit | Nominated | |
| 39th Korean Association of Film Critics Awards | 2019 | Critics' Top 10 | Exit | Won | |
| 2019 Women's Filmmaker of the Year Award | 2019 | Filmmaker Award | Kang Hye-jeong for Svaha: The Sixth Finger and Exit | Won | |

=== State honors ===
Name of country, year given, and name of honor
| Country | Award Ceremony | Year | Honor | Ref. |
|---|---|---|---|---|
| South Korea | 7th Korean Popular Culture and Arts Awards (Note: Honors are given at the Korean Content Awards (대한민국 콘텐츠 대상) arranged by the Korea Creative Content Agency and hosted by the Ministry of Culture, Sports and Tourism. The 2022 Korea Content Awards Ceremony, which started in 2009 and celebrated its 14th this year, aims to inspire pride in the content industry and develop the Korean cultural content industry by discovering and awarding contributors and excellent content that have contributed to the development of the content industry in 2022. It is a place to promote. The winners (works) of honor, which are recommended through the website of the Korea Creative Content Agency (www.kocca.kr) and announced through careful examination by experts and three-step verification, play a leading role in shining the Korean content industry in the world.) | 2017 | Prime Minister's Commendation | |

== See also ==
- Filmmaker R&K
- Ryoo Seung-wan
