= Dachimawa Lee =

- Theatrical release poster
- Hangul: 다찌마와 리: 악인이여 지옥행 급행열차를 타라!
- RR: Dajjimawa Ri: aginiyeo jiokhaeng geuphaengyeolchareul tara!
- MR: Tatchimawa Ri: aginiyŏ chiokhaeng kŭphaengyŏlch'arŭl t'ara!
- Directed by: Ryoo Seung-wan
- Written by: Ryoo Seung-wan; Kwon Hyeok-jae
- Produced by: Kand Hye-junk
- Starring: Im Won-hee; Gong Hyo-jin; Park Si-yeon
- Cinematography: Jo Yong-gyu
- Edited by: Nam Na-yeong
- Music by: Choi Seung-hyun
- Production company: Filmmaker R&K
- Distributed by: Showbox
- Release date: August 13, 2008
- Running time: 99 minutes
- Country: South Korea
- Language: Korean
- Box office: US$3.7 million

Dachimawa Lee (Korean: 다찌마와 리: 악인이여 지옥행 급행열차를 타라!;) is a 2008 South Korean period spy action comedy film. It has been released via online streaming in the United States with the title Dachimawa Lee: Gangnam Spy.

== Plot ==
The legendary Korean spy Dachimawa Lee is assigned to recover the fabled Golden Buddha statue, but his mission ends in failure. Lee discovers that his mission was sabotaged, and must confront against the shadowy figure behind the plot.

== Cast ==
- Im Won-hee as Dachimawa Lee
- Gong Hyo-jin as Keum Yeon-ja
- Park Si-yeon as Ma-ri
- Hwang Bo-ra as Weird girl
- Kim Byeong-ok as Mr. Wang
- Kim Su-hyeon as Dama Ne-gi
- Ahn Gil-kang as Jin-sang 6
- Ryoo Seung-bum as National border wildcat
- Oh Ji-hye as Madame Jang
- Jo Deok-hyeon as Hoo Gga-shi
- Lee Jeong-heon as Ya-shi
- Gary (cameo)
- Gil Seong-joon (cameo)
- Kim Roi-ha as General Kim

== Release ==
Dachimawa Lee was released in South Korea on August 13, 2008, and was ranked fourth at the box office in its opening weekend with 233,251 admissions. By September 7, 2008, it had received a total of 629,591 admissions, and by September 14, 2008, had grossed a total of US$3,715,997.
