= Ryoo Seung-wan =

South Korean filmmaker (born 1973)

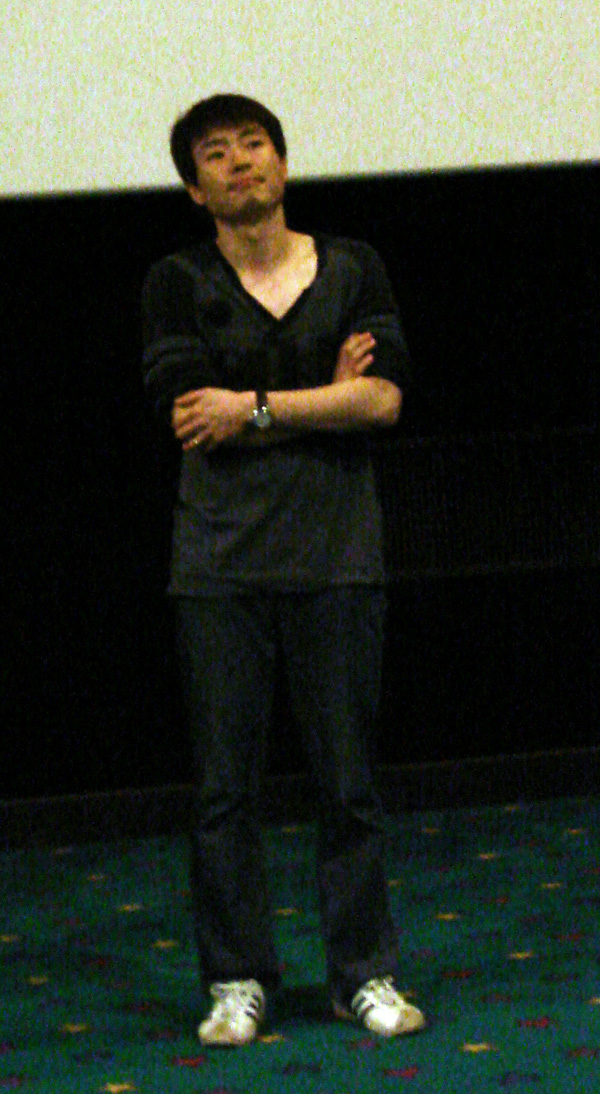
- Ryoo in 2008
- Born: December 15, 1973 (age 52); Onyang, South Chungcheong Province, South Korea
- Occupations: Film director; producer; screenwriter; actor
- Years active: 1996–present
- Employer: Filmmaker R&K
- Spouse: Kang Hye-jung (m. 1997)
- Children: 3
- Family: Ryoo Seung-bum (brother)

Korean name
- Hangul: 류승완
- Hanja: 柳昇完
- RR: Ryu Seungwan
- MR: Ryu Sŭngwan

Ryoo Seung-wan (Korean: 류승완; born December 15, 1973) is a South Korean filmmaker. He made his debut in 1996 with the short film Dangerous Head, then worked as an assistant director under director Park Chan-wook, took film lessons, and made his feature film debut with Die Bad (2000). He received the Blue Dragon Film Awards for Best New Director, drawing attention from the film industry. Ryoo Seung-wan is called Korea's "action kid" for his unique action and rough life style.

He has directed films such as Crying Fist (2005), The Unjust (2010), The Berlin File (2013), Veteran (2015), Escape from Mogadishu (2021), Smugglers (2023) and Humint (2026).

== Early life ==
Born in Onyang, South Chungcheong Province, Ryoo's fist exposure to cinema was Hong Kong action films from the likes of Jackie Chan, which turned him into a fan of the genre, especially that in his childhood Korean cinema was reduced to propaganda and hostess films, due to censorship. He took up taekwondo and saved money to buy an 8mm camera, determined to become a director.

Ryoo became his family's sole breadwinner after he lost his parents while in middle school. He later dropped out of high school in 1992 and worked for six months to raise enough money to cover a year's worth of basic living expenses for his family. After that he joined a private film workshop, and paid his tuition through several part-time jobs: as a construction worker, hotel janitor, vegetable cart driver, and even an instructor at an illegal driving school.

== Career ==
=== 1998–2004 ===
Ryoo saw Park Chan-wook's 1992 debut The Moon Is... the Sun's Dream and his work as a critic. He became a fan and went to meet Park and the two quickly became friends. Those formative years also saw Ryoo's debut as a 'real' director, with the 1996 short Transmutated Head (변질헤드). The 19-minute short's DP was Jang Joon-hwan (then a young film academy student), and it featured many familiar faces in the Korean indie scene, including character actor Heo Jong-soo and Lee Mu-young (future director of The Humanist).

With a few years of experience as assistant director on Whispering Corridors and Park's 1997 film Trio, Ryoo was ready to start his own career. Initially, he wanted to make a feature film, but due to external circumstamces, he was forced to shoot separate short films that shared themes and characters. In 1998, his short film Rumble (패싸움) won him the Best Film at the 1998 Busan Short Film Festival, and a year later he signed a contract to develop a feature film out of Rumble and three following sequels, one of which was his short Modern Man, which won Best Film and the audience award at the Korean Independent Short Film Festival in 1999.

From 1996 to 1999, Ryoo shot four low-budget short films starring himself, his younger brother Ryoo Seung-bum, and several friends. In strikingly diverse styles but with a common narrative, these shorts were re-edited, combined and released in 2000 as Ryoo Seung-wan's feature directorial debut Die Bad, made with a very low budget of ₩65 million. It became a cult hit overnight. One review described Ryoo Seung-bum's acting debut as "a startling, naturalistic turn," and he won Best New Actor at the Grand Bell Awards.

In 2000 the now defunct Cine4M website released a short film by Ryoo alongside Jang Jin's A Terrible Day and Kim Jee-woon's Coming Out. Ryoo Seung-wan's Dachimawa Lee, titled after industry slang ("tachimawari" is a part of Kabuki theater plays that involve over-the-top action scenes), was a 35-minute short film parodying Korean action films and melodramas, Bruce Lee, Jackie Chan and Shaw Brothers movies. It was a success, making a name for actor Im Won-hee and further solidifying the Ryoo brothers in the industry.

Ryoo's first action noir, No Blood No Tears starred Jeon Do-yeon alongside talented theater actors like Jung Jae-young. The film disappointed critics, but Ryoo continued to make the stories he envisioned, next producing Arahan, a mix of modern-day wuxia and comedy. Although it fared well commercially, critics were not receiving it well.

=== 2005–2009 ===
Ryoo returned in 2005 with Crying Fist, starring veteran actor Choi Min-sik, and officially catapulting his brother, Seung-bum into fame. The film opened April 1, 2005, competing against Kim Jee-woon's A Bittersweet Life. Both got good reviews, but did not fare well at the box office.

In 2005, Ryoo established Filmmaker R&K with his wife Kang Hye-jeong.

After the success of 2003's If You Were Me, South Korea's National Commission on Human Rights commissioned a second omnibus film in 2006, If You Were Me 2. Five directors — Park Kyung-hee, Jang Jin, Jung Ji-woo, Kim Dong-won and Ryoo — contributed short films on a human rights issue of their choosing. Ryoo's short Hey Man! is about a man (Kim Su-yeon) with multiple prejudices that lead him to abandon his friends and patrons of the restaurant he frequents. In 2006, Seoul Art Cinema organized a special program "Anatomy of Violence: Ryoo Seung-wan's Action School" wherein Ryoo selected 10 films to screen and discuss with participants, including five of his own works. The program aimed to better understand the art of action filmmaking.

Waiting to secure funding for his first zombie film Yacha, Ryoo released The City of Violence, a low-budget HD action film. As Ryoo described it as a Jackie Chan-style piece, set in a world similar to Roman Polanski's Chinatown.

In 2009 Ryoo directed four mini-movies for the Korea Tourism Organization targeted at the Chinese market. Each movie tells a story that represents the beauty of Korea's travel locations through four themes: Hallyu (Korean movies and dramas), food, shopping and trendy places to visit like Hongdae or Cheongdam-dong. The tourism commercials starred Gao Yuanyuan and Li Guangjie as a Chinese couple, with cameos by Song Seung-heon, Park Hae-jin and Park Eun-hye.

Then to promote the release of Motorola's new model MOTO Klassic, Ryoo wrote and directed a 22-minute short film starring American-born Japanese martial arts star Kane Kosugi and action choreographer Jung Doo-hong. Titled Timeless and set at Jung's stunt school, the mockumentary-style short eschews the use of CGI in fight scenes and advances the return to old school action.

=== 2010–present ===
His 2010 film The Unjust, a tale about corruption among policemen and prosecutors, received rave reviews for its seamless storytelling interspersed with action sequences, social commentary and powerhouse performances from Hwang Jung-min and brother Seung-bum. It was successful at the box office with more than 2.7 million tickets sold, landing it on that year's top ten box office list.

Ryoo's next movie The Berlin File was an espionage thriller about a North Korean spy who is betrayed and cut loose when a weapons deal is exposed. While preparing for the film, Ryoo met with several North Korean defectors and shot the documentary Spies for Korean broadcaster MBC as part of a special series that aired in 2011, intending "to make a realistic, fast-paced, Korean-style espionage action film about South Korean agents discovering North Korea's secret accounts and how political dynamics between the two Koreas get involved." Ryoo said he wanted the film to be reminiscent of The Bourne Identity, and on an emotional level, to focus on the solitude and sorrow of those who live as secret agents. It was shot almost 100% on location in Europe, namely in Berlin, Germany, and Riga, Latvia. The film attracted 7.17 million admissions in early 2013 to become the all-time highest-grossing Korean action film. But because of its big budget, it barely broke even commercially. Ryoo later said that the picture failed to fully connect with younger audiences which know little of the Cold War era, and that "after making such an expensive film, (his) take-away was that (he) needed to make a cheaper one."

In 2015, Ryoo wrote and directed Veteran, an action film about an amoral and powerful third-generation business tycoon doggedly pursued by a detective investigating the mysterious injuries of a truck driver.

Ryoo said, "Because (the movie) is about the world I know and the story about people I know, it was comfortable for me. [...] But my feeling comfortable doesn't mean that the work is easy. It just means that I'm comfortable (working out the troubles). [...] I didn't want the movie to be based on personal revenge, and I want it to show how a person gets justice through the legal system."

Made with a modest budget of ₩6 billion, Veteran became a huge blockbuster at the South Korean box office, attracting 13.3 million admissions and earning US$89.7 million. It is the biggest hit of Ryoo's career and was the 5th all-time highest-grossing film in Korean cinema history at the time.

His next project was The Battleship Island, set on Hashima Island, an outlying island abandoned by Japan off the coast of Nagasaki, where countless Koreans were drafted into forced labor during World War II. The film follows a group of American OSS agents and Korean independence fighters on a mission to evacuate a key Korean figure from the island.

In 2021, Ryoo directed Escape from Mogadishu, a film based on real events of the Somali Civil War in the 1990s. It depicted details of perilous escape attempt made by North and South Korean embassy personnel stranded during the conflict. The film made with production cost of ₩24 billion was entirely shot in Morocco. It was selected as the South Korean entry for the Best International Feature Film at the 94th Academy Awards.

Ryu's next project was Smugglers, which is said to be based on the motif of haenyeo who participated in smuggling in the 1970s, overlapping with the fact that a female smuggling ring was active in Busan at the time. It was followed by I, The Executioner in 2024, which is actually a sequel to Veteran and its plot takes place nine years after the original's. The film was invited to screen at the 77th Cannes Film Festival.

In 2026, the director returned to the espionage genre with Humint, shot in Riga. Two months after the theatrical release, it started streaming on Netflix. The film did well on the streaming platform, but was not very successful at the box office, where it was overshawdowed by the massive popularity of The King's Warden.

== Filmmaking ==
Ryoo Seung-wan is called Korea's 'action kid' for his unique action and rough life style. Ryoo has cited 1970s American cinema as a primary inspiration for his work, specifically naming Martin Scorsese and Brian De Palma as major influences. He has expressed particular admiration for De Palma’s thriller and gangster films, including Sisters (1972), Scarface (1983), Raising Cain (1992), and Carlito's Way (1993). His appreciation for the era extends to the "tough guy" films of Lee Marvin, such as Point Blank (1967) and Prime Cut (1972), as well as the classical work of John Boorman, specifically Deliverance (1972). Within South Korean cinema, Ryoo views Park Chan-wook as both a mentor and a frequent collaborator. He also credits directors Lee Chang-dong and Bong Joon-ho as significant influences. He has highlighted Lee Doo-yong’s 1980 film The Last Witness as a particularly impactful work.

Ryoo frequently collaborated with film editor Nam Na-yeong. She has edited films Arahan, The City of Violence, and Crying Fist.

Ryoo is known for frequently casting the same actors, including his brother Ryoo Seung-bum, Hwang Jung-min, and Zo In-sung.

== Personal life ==
Ryoo met Kang Hye-jung in the Independent Film Council workshop. Ryoo was working as a workshop assistant, and they started dating after collaborating on a project. In 1997, Ryoo married Kang after 4 years of dating. They have three children together, a daughter and two sons.

== Filmography ==
=== Feature films ===
Feature films credits
Year	Title		Credited as			Ref.
Year	English	Korean	Director	Writer	Producer	Ref.
1997	Trio	3인조	Assistant director	No	No	
1998	Whispering Corridors	여고괴담	Assistant director	No	No	
1999	Dr. K	닥터 K	Assistant director	No	No	
2000	Die Bad	죽거나 혹은 나쁘거나	Yes	Yes	No	
2002	No Blood No Tears	피도 눈물도 없이	Yes	Yes	No	
2004	Arahan	아라한 장풍대작전	Yes	Yes	No	
2005	Crying Fist	주먹이 운다	Yes	Yes	No	
2006	The City of Violence	짝패	Yes	Yes	Yes	
2008	Dachimawa Lee	다찌마와 리: 악인이여 지옥행 급행열차를 타라!	Yes	Yes	No	
2010	Troubleshooter	해결사	No	Yes	Yes	
2010	The Unjust	부당거래	Yes	No	Yes	
2013	The Berlin File	베를린	Yes	Yes	No	
2015	Veteran	베테랑	Yes	Yes	No	
2017	The Battleship Island	군함도	Yes	Yes	No	
2019	Svaha: The Sixth Finger	사바하	Jang Jae-hyun	No	Yes	
2019	Exit	엑시트	Lee Sang-geun	No	Yes	
2019	Start-Up	시동	Choi Jung-yeol	No	Yes	
2021	Escape from Mogadishu	모가디슈	Yes	Yes	No	
2023	Smugglers	밀수	Yes	Yes	Yes	
2024	I, the Executioner	베테랑2	Yes	Yes	Yes	
2023	Dr. Cheon and Lost Talisman	천박사 퇴마 연구소: 설경의 비밀	Kim Seong-sik	No	Yes	
2025	Pretty Crazy	악마가 이사왔다	Lee Sang-geun	No	Yes	
2026	Humint	휴민트	Yes	Yes	Yes	

=== Short films ===
Year	Title		Credited as				Ref.
Year	English	Korean	Director	Writer	Producer	Cameo	Ref.
1996	Transmutated Head	변질헤드	Yes	Yes	Yes	No	
1999	Rumble	패싸움	Yes	Yes	No	Yes	
1999	Our Contemporaries	현대인	Yes	Yes	No	Yes	
2000	Dachimawa Lee	다찌마와 LEE	Yes	Yes	No	Yes	
2006	Hey Man short film from If You Were Me 2	남자니까 아시잖아요?	Yes	No	No	No	
2009	Come to Korea; KTO mini-movie tourism commercials	한국 놀러오세요	Yes	No	No	No	
2009	Timeless; MotoKlassic short film		Yes	Yes	No	Yes	
2011	Spies; MBC documentary	간첩	Yes	No	No	No	
2013	Behind the Camera	뒷담화: 감독이 미쳤어요	No	No	No	Yes	
2013	TASTEmakers Film Project			No	Yes	No	
2014	Ghost short film from Mad Sad Bad	신촌좀비만화	Yes	No	No	No	
2014	One Summer Night	인생은 새옹지마	Kim Tae-yong	No	Yes	No	

=== Cameos ===
Year	Title		Role
Year	English	Korean	Role
1997	Trio	3인조	Musical instrument store clerk
2000	Die Bad	죽거나 혹은 나쁘거나	Seok-hwan
2002	Sympathy for Mr. Vengeance	복수는 나의 것	Chinese restaurant delivery man
2002	Oasis	오아시스	Hong Jong-se
2005	Lady Vengeance	친절한 금자씨	Passerby
2006	The City of Violence	짝패	Yoo Seok-hwan
2008	Dachimawa Lee	다찌마와 리: 악인이여 지옥행 급행열차를 타라!	Voice only
2010	Battlefield Heroes	평양성	Commando captain 1
2011	Mama	마마	Musical director
2013	Top Star	톱스타	Jeonju Film Festival VIP Role
2014	Gyeongju	경주	Teacher Kang

=== Music videos ===
Year	Title	Artist	Credited as Director	Ref.
2002	"Dust"	Dragonfly	Yes	
2007	"Ballerino"	Leessang	Yes	
2009	"The Girl Who Can't Break Up, The Boy Who Can't Leave"	Leessang	Yes	

== Recurring cast members ==
Ryoo frequently re-casts actors whom he has worked with on previous films.

Recurring cast members in Ryoo's directed works
Actor Work	Hwang Jung-min	Im Won-hee	Kim Byeong-ok	Ma Dong-seok	Park Jeong-min	Ryu Seung-beom	Yoo Hae-jin	Zo In-sung
Die Bad						check		
No Blood No Tears						check		
Arahan						check		
Crying Fist		check	check			check		
The City of Violence			check					
Dachimawa Lee		check	check			check		
The Unjust	check			check		check	check	
The Berlin File						check		
Veteran	check			check			check	
The Battleship Island	check							
Escape from Mogadishu								check
Smugglers					check			check
I, the Executioner	check							
Humint					check			check

== Accolades ==
=== Awards and nominations ===
Year	Award	Category	Nominated work	Result	Ref.
2000	Blue Dragon Film Awards	Best New Director	Die Bad	Won	
2010	13th Director's Cut Awards	Best Director	The Unjust	Won	
2011	2nd Seoul Art and Culture Awards	Best Film Director	The Unjust	Won	
2011	47th Baeksang Arts Awards	Best Film	The Unjust	Nominated	
2011	47th Baeksang Arts Awards	Best Director	The Unjust	Nominated	
2011	20th Buil Film Awards	Best Film	The Unjust	Nominated	
2011	20th Buil Film Awards	Best Director	The Unjust	Nominated	
2011	44th Sitges Film Festival	Best Film (Casa Asia section)	The Unjust	Won	
2011	48th Grand Bell Awards	Best Film	The Unjust	Nominated	
2011	48th Grand Bell Awards	Best Director	The Unjust	Nominated	
2011	32nd Blue Dragon Film Awards	Best Film	The Unjust	Won	
2011	32nd Blue Dragon Film Awards	Best Director	The Unjust	Won	
2013	49th Baeksang Arts Awards	Best Film	The Berlin File	Nominated	
2013	49th Baeksang Arts Awards	Best Director	The Berlin File	Nominated	
2013	22nd Buil Film Awards	Best Director	The Berlin File	Won	
2013	22nd Buil Film Awards	Best Screenplay	The Berlin File	Nominated	
2013	34th Blue Dragon Film Awards	Best Film	The Berlin File	Nominated	
2013	34th Blue Dragon Film Awards	Best Director	The Berlin File	Nominated	
2015	48th Sitges Film Festival	Casa Asia Award (Asia Focus - Best Film)	Veteran	Won	
2015	35th Korean Association of Film Critics Awards	Best Film	Veteran	Nominated	
2015	35th Korean Association of Film Critics Awards	Best Director	Veteran	Won	
2015	35th Korean Association of Film Critics Awards	Best Screenplay	Veteran	Nominated	
2015	35th Korean Association of Film Critics Awards	Top 10 Films of the Year	Veteran	Won	
2015	15th Korea World Youth Film Festival	Most Favorite Film Director	Veteran	Won	
2015	52nd Grand Bell Awards	Best Film	Veteran	Nominated	
2015	52nd Grand Bell Awards	Best Director	Veteran	Nominated	
2015	52nd Grand Bell Awards	Best Screenplay	Veteran	Nominated	
2015	36th Blue Dragon Film Awards	Best Film	Veteran	Nominated	
2015	36th Blue Dragon Film Awards	Best Director	Veteran	Won	
2015	36th Blue Dragon Film Awards	Best Screenplay	Veteran	Nominated	
2015	Cine 21 Movie Awards	Best Director	Veteran	Won	
2015	2nd Korean Film Producers Association Awards	Best Director	Veteran	Won	
2016	7th KOFRA Film Awards	Best Director	Veteran	Won	
2016	11th Max Movie Awards	Best Film	Veteran	Won	
2016	11th Max Movie Awards	Best Director	Veteran	Won	
2016	11th Max Movie Awards	Best Poster	Veteran	Nominated	
2016	10th Asian Film Awards	Best Film	Veteran	Nominated	
2016	10th Asian Film Awards	Best Director	Veteran	Nominated	
2016	10th Asian Film Awards	Best Screenplay	Veteran	Nominated	
2016	52nd Baeksang Arts Awards	Best Film	Veteran	Nominated	
2016	52nd Baeksang Arts Awards	Best Director (Film)	Veteran	Won	
2016	52nd Baeksang Arts Awards	Best Screenplay (Film)	Veteran	Nominated	
2016	25th Buil Film Awards	Best Film	Veteran	Won	
2016	25th Buil Film Awards	Best Director	Veteran	Nominated	
2016	25th Buil Film Awards	Best Screenplay	Veteran	Nominated	
	n1st The Seoul Awards	Best Film	The Battleship Island	Nominated	
	Sitges Film Festival	Best Feature-length Film	The Battleship Island	Won	
	37th Korean Association of Film Critics Awards	Top 10 Films	The Battleship Island	Won	
	23rd Chunsa Film Art Awards	Best Director	The Battleship Island	Nominated	
2021	30th Buil Film Awards	Best Film	Escape from Mogadishu	Won	
2021	30th Buil Film Awards	Best Director	Escape from Mogadishu	Nominated	
2021	30th Buil Film Awards	Best Screenplay	Escape from Mogadishu	Won (Note: Ryoo Seung-wan and Lee Ki-cheol)	
2021	42nd Blue Dragon Film Awards	Best Film	Escape from Mogadishu	Won	
2021	42nd Blue Dragon Film Awards	Best Director	Escape from Mogadishu	Won	
2021	42nd Blue Dragon Film Awards	Best Screenplay	Escape from Mogadishu	Nominated	
2021	Korean Association of Film Critics Awards	Best Director	Escape from Mogadishu	Won	
2021	8th Korean Film Writers Association Awards	Best Film	Escape from Mogadishu	Won	
2022	58th Baeksang Arts Awards	Grand Prize (Daesang)– Film (Note: A Daesang (Korean: 대상), which translates to "Grand Prize", is the highest honor given out at South Korean award ceremonies.)	Escape from Mogadishu	Won	
2022	58th Baeksang Arts Awards	Best Film	Escape from Mogadishu	Won	
2022	58th Baeksang Arts Awards	Best Director	Escape from Mogadishu	Nominated	
2022	58th Baeksang Arts Awards	Best Screenplay	Escape from Mogadishu	Nominated	
2022	Fantasporto	Best Orient Express Film	Escape from Mogadishu	Won	
2022	Chunsa Film Art Awards 2022	Best Director	Escape from Mogadishu	Nominated	
2022	Chunsa Film Art Awards 2022	Best Screenplay	Escape from Mogadishu	Nominated	
2023	32nd Buil Film Awards	Best Director	Smugglers	Nominated	
2023	32nd Buil Film Awards	Best Film	Smugglers	Nominated	
2023	44th Blue Dragon Film Awards	Best Film	Smugglers	Won	
2023	44th Blue Dragon Film Awards	Best Director	Smugglers	Nominated	
2023	59th Grand Bell Awards	Best Film	Smugglers	Nominated	
2023	59th Grand Bell Awards	Best Director	Smugglers	Won	
2024	60th Baeksang Arts Awards	Best Director	Smugglers	Nominated	

=== State honors ===
Name of country, year given, and name of honor
Country	Ceremony	Year	Honor Or Award	Ref.
South Korea	Korean Popular Culture and Arts Awards (Note: Honors are given at the Korean Popular Culture and Arts Awards, arranged by the Korea Creative Content Agency and hosted by the Ministry of Culture, Sports and Tourism. They are awarded to those who have contributed to the arts and South Korea's pop culture.)	2013	Presidential Commendation	

=== Listicles ===
Name of publisher, year listed, name of listicle, and placement
Publisher	Year	Listicle	Placement	Ref.
Cine21	2015	Film Director of the Year	1st	

== See also ==
- List of Korean film directors
- Cinema of Korea
