= Smugglers (2023 film) =

2023 South Korean film

- Theatrical release poster
- Hangul: 밀수
- Hanja: 密輸
- RR: Milsu
- MR: Milsu
- Directed by: Ryoo Seung-wan
- Written by: Ryoo Seung-wan; Kim Jeong-yeon; Choi Cha-won
- Produced by: Kang Hye-jung; Jo Seong-min; Ryoo Seung-wan
- Starring: Kim Hye-soo; Yum Jung-ah; Zo In-sung; Park Jeong-min; Kim Jong-soo; Go Min-si
- Cinematography: Choi Young-hwan
- Edited by: Lee Kang-hee
- Music by: Chang Kiha
- Production company: Filmmaker R&K
- Distributed by: Next Entertainment World
- Release date: July 26, 2023
- Running time: 129 minutes
- Country: South Korea
- Language: Korean
- Budget: US$15.8 million
- Box office: US$36.9 million

Smugglers (Korean: 밀수; RR: Milsu) is a 2023 South Korean crime film directed by Ryoo Seung-wan, who co-wrote the film with Kim Jeong-yeon. The film stars Kim Hye-soo, Yum Jung-ah, Zo In-sung, Park Jeong-min, Kim Jong-soo, and Go Min-si. It was released theatrically on July 26, 2023.

The film is said to be based on the motif of haenyeo who participated in smuggling in the 1970s, overlapping with the fact that a female smuggling ring was active in Busan at the time.

== Plot ==
In 1974, in the small coastal village of Guncheon, a group of female divers (haenyeo), including Jo Chun-ja and Um Jin-sook, struggle to make a living due to pollution from a nearby chemical plant. With their catches spoiled, Jin-sook's father, Captain Um, is persuaded by a smuggling broker to use their fishing boat, Maengryong-ho, for underwater smuggling. Initially hesitant, the haenyeo eventually agree to retrieve goods dumped underwater in exchange for money, leading to sudden prosperity in their impoverished village.

As the smuggling escalates, Chun-ja convinces the others to participate in a gold smuggling operation without informing Captain Um as he refused due to higher risk. During the mission, a box accidentally breaks open, revealing the gold, just as customs officers led by officer Lee Jang-chun arrive. In a frantic escape, the ship's anchor gets stuck, and Jin-sook's brother, Jin-goo, is knocked unconscious. Captain Um dies trying to save him, leaving Jin-sook devastated. Chun-ja escapes unnoticed, while the rest of the haenyeo are arrested and jailed, Jin-sook for the longest due to being a mastermind. As the members of the smuggling team slowly being released, they reveal to Jin-sook of Chun-ja escape and suspect that she was the one that tipped off the customs about the gold smuggling. This fact is strengthen even further as Chun-ja never visit any of them in prison. Jin-sook vows revenge on Chun-ja for her treachery after she gets out.

Years later, Chun-ja is running her own smuggling business in Seoul, but when she encroaches on a turf of a major smuggler of Seoul named Kwon Pil-sam, she is captured and tortured. She offers Guncheon as an alternative smuggling route as all Kwon's current smuggling routes are being monitored heavily by the police. Reconnecting with her old community, Chun-ja and her haenyeo are forced to work with the former crewmember Jang Do-ri who is now a major smuggler. Chun-ja is dishearten of the fact that she is no longer the boss like she used to be. When Chun-ja goes back to Guncheon with Kwon to conduct their smuggling operation, Jin-sook comes and confronts her. Later on, Chun-ja reveals that she did not betray them to the customs and the reason why she had to hide and did not come to visit them was because she was wanted for stabbing a man who raped her.

After one of her friends was attacked by a shark, Jin-sook is forced to collaborate with Chun-ja in exchange Chun-ja and Kwon would cover up the medical bills. Jin-sook suspected that the custom officers are watching them so she used her friend, Go Ok-bun who committed tax fraud to bait them as their informant. Eventually, the custom officers are baited into capturing a boat with only mussels while the smuggled goods are kept and retrieved somewhere else.

Kwon reveals to Jun-ja that Jang Do-ri was the one that sold her and the rest of her crew years ago. Kwon further emphasizes that he does not trust Do-ri and plans to get rid of him in the next job and invite Jun-ja and Jin-sook's crew to be his partners. At the same time, Do-ri also plans to eliminate Kwon and takes over his smuggling operation after he fed up of Kwon's disrespect toward him. Jin-sook goes to the custom office to find out who truly sold out her crew but the officer in charge refuses due to confidentiality. Chun-ja comes and reveals Do-ri's treachery to her and further reveals that she found out that Do-ri was in cohort of the custom officer in charge Lee Jang-chun at the time to steal the golds for themselves. They also killed the middle-man to silent him. Ok-bum sneaks into the custom office and steals a informant file, which validating Chun-ja's innocence. Jin-sook apologizes to Chun-ja for misjudging her and plans with her to get revenge on Do-ri and Jang-chun by pitting them against each other.

As Chunja and Kwon plan their moves, Do-ri and his men attack their place unexpectedly. Kwon's second-in-command sacrifices himself so his boss and Chunja can escape. Kwon dies after an intense fight with Do-ri and his remaining goons. Chun-ja bargains her life with a shipment of diamond worth $300 million. Ok-beum is beaten to a pulp by Jang-chun for her previous deception and Jin-sook comes and reveals the diamond shipment and lies to him that Do-ri plans to get rid of him to get all the diamonds to himself. Jin-sook then furthers state that Do-ri holds the evidence of his gold dealing in the past as insurance and will use it to get rid of him. Alerted, Jang-chun orders his men to raid Do-ri's hideout and finds the informant document in his safe. It is turned out Ok-beum secretly sneaked the document inside Do-ri's safe to plan distrust between the two of them.

The next day, Jang-chun forces Jin-sook and her crew to dive to retrieve the diamond and plans to eliminate them once he got the smuggled diamonds. The haenyeo easily dispatches the thugs underwater due to their diving experience. Jang-jun tries to kill them all with his shotgun but Ok-beum shoves him into the water and he is drown by the combined force of the women. Do-ri takes Jang-chun's shotgun and forces the group at gunpoint to get the diamond. Knowing full well how amateurish Do-ri is in sailing, they anchor the boat in a huge rock to trick him to lift the anchor while they sneak behind and pull the fishing net to trip and subdue him. Do-ri falls from the boat and the sharks are surrounding him, attracting by the bleeding from his injuries. Do-ri pledges Jin-sook to save him and promise her a lucrative smuggling operation. However, Jin-sook throws the shotgun at him and he is devoured by the hungry shark.

== Cast ==
- Kim Hye-soo as Jo Chun-ja
- Yum Jung-ah as Um Jin-sook
- Zo In-sung as Kwon Pil-sam
- Park Jeong-min as Jang Do-ri
- Kim Jong-soo as Lee Jang-chun
- Go Min-si as Go Ok-bun
- Kim Jae-hwa as Pig mom
- Park Jun-myeon as Yang Geum-ne
- Park Kyung-hye as Dok-soon
- Joo Bo-bi as Eok-cheok
- Baek Joo-hee as Somers
- Jin Kyung as Laura
- Yoon Kyung-ho as Chief Detective

== Production ==
Principal photography began on June 5, 2021 and ended on October 13.

== Release ==
The film was officially invited to the Special Presentations section at 2023 Toronto International Film Festival, which held from September 7 to 17 following the Locarno International Film Festival.

== Reception ==
=== Box office ===
The film was released on July 26, 2023 in South Korea. The opening recorded 318,084 admissions and topped the South Korean box office for two weeks. The film surpassed 1 million admissions on fourth day of its released and surpassed 4 million on their 17th days of released. Smugglers became the second movie to reach break-even point in 2023 after The Roundup: No Way Out.

== Accolades ==
Name of the award ceremony, year presented, category, nominee of the award, and the result of the nomination
Award ceremony	Year	Category	Nominee	Result	Ref.
Baeksang Arts Awards	2024	Best Director	Ryoo Seung-wan	Nominated	
Baeksang Arts Awards	2024	Best Actress	Yum Jung-ah	Nominated	
Baeksang Arts Awards	2024	Best Supporting Actor	Kim Jong-soo	Won	
Baeksang Arts Awards	2024	Best Supporting Actor	Park Jeong-min	Nominated	
Baeksang Arts Awards	2024	Best New Actress	Go Min-si	Nominated	
Blue Dragon Film Awards	2023	Best Film	Smugglers	Won	
Blue Dragon Film Awards	2023	Best Director	Ryoo Seung-wan	Nominated	
Blue Dragon Film Awards	2023	Best Actress	Kim Hye-soo	Nominated	
Blue Dragon Film Awards	2023	Best Actress	Yum Jung-ah	Nominated	
Blue Dragon Film Awards	2023	Best Supporting Actor	Zo In-sung	Won	
Blue Dragon Film Awards	2023	Best Supporting Actor	Park Jeong-min	Nominated	
Blue Dragon Film Awards	2023	Best New Actress	Go Min-si	Won	
Blue Dragon Film Awards	2023	Best Screenplay	Ryoo Seung-wan	Nominated	
Blue Dragon Film Awards	2023	Best Music	Chang Kiha	Won	
Blue Dragon Film Awards	2023	Best Cinematography and lighting	Choi Young-hwan, Lee Jae-hyeok	Nominated	
Blue Dragon Film Awards	2023	Best Art Direction	Lee Hoo-kyoung	Nominated	
Blue Dragon Film Awards	2023	Best Film Editing	Lee Gang-hee	Nominated	
Buil Film Awards	2023	Best Supporting Actor	Kim Jong-soo	Won	
Buil Film Awards	2023	Best Supporting Actress	Go Min-si	Won	
Buil Film Awards	2023	Best New Actress	Go Min-si	Nominated	
Buil Film Awards	2023	Best Actress	Yum Jung-ah	Nominated	
Buil Film Awards	2023	Best Film	Smugglers	Nominated	
Buil Film Awards	2023	Best Director	Ryoo Seung-wan	Nominated	
Buil Film Awards	2023	Best Music	Chang Kiha	Nominated	
Buil Film Awards	2023	Best Cinematography	Choi Young-hwan	Nominated	
Buil Film Awards	2023	Art/technical Award	Lee Hoo-kyoung	Nominated	
Busan International Film Festival with Marie Claire Asia Star Awards	2023	Face of Asia Award	Go Min-si	Won	
Chunsa Film Art Awards	2023	Best Actress	Kim Hye-soo	Won	
Chunsa Film Art Awards	2023	Best Supporting Actor	Kim Jong-soo	Won	
Chunsa Film Art Awards	2023	Best New Actress	Go Min-si	Won	
Grand Bell Awards	2023	Best Film	Smugglers	Nominated	
Grand Bell Awards	2023	Best Director	Ryoo Seung-wan	Won	
Grand Bell Awards	2023	Best Actress	Yum Jung-ah	Nominated	
Grand Bell Awards	2023	Best Supporting Actress	Go Min-si	Nominated	
Grand Bell Awards	2023	Best Supporting Actor	Park Jeong-min	Nominated	
Grand Bell Awards	2023	Best Supporting Actor	Kim Jong-soo	Nominated	
Grand Bell Awards	2023	Best Music	Chang Kiha	Nominated	
Grand Bell Awards	2023	Best Cinematography	Choi Young-hwan	Won	
Grand Bell Awards	2023	Best Film Editing	Lee Gang-hee	Nominated	
Grand Bell Awards	2023	Best Art Direction	Lee Hoo-kyung	Nominated	
Grand Bell Awards	2023	Best Costume Design	Yoon Jung-hee, Kwon Soo-kyung	Nominated	
Korean Association of Film Critics Awards	2023	Best Supporting Actor	Kim Jong-soo	Won	
Korean Association of Film Critics Awards	2023	Technical Award: (Art)	Lee Hoo-kyoung	Won	
Korean Association of Film Critics Awards	2023	Music Award	Chang Kiha	Won	
