= Oh Yoon-hong =

South Korean actress (born 1971)

- Born: Oh Yoon-hong; August 9, 1971 (age 55); Seoul, South Korea
- Other name: Oh Yun-hong
- Education: Dankook University; Sogang University; Chung-Ang University
- Occupations: Actress; film director; screenwriter; professor
- Years active: 1997–present
- Agent: Star Village Entertainment
- Known for: Who Are You: School 2015; Solomon's Perjury; The Scholar Who Walks the Night
- Children: 2

Oh Yoon-hong (Korean: 오윤홍; born 9 August 1971) is a South Korean actress. She is best known for her roles in dramas such as Who Are You: School 2015, Solomon's Perjury and The Scholar Who Walks the Night.

== Filmography ==
=== Television series ===
Year	Title	Role	Ref.
2004	Toji, the Land	Ok-ne	
2008	In The Name Of The Father	Hwa-young	
2013	Puberty Medley	Ah-young's mother	
2014	Misaeng: Incomplete Life	Sang-shik's wife	
2015	Who Are You: School 2015	Min-young and Soo-in mother	
2016	The Scholar Who Walks the Night	Kkot-bun	
2016	My Old Friend	Yoon-sook	
2016–2017	Solomon's Perjury	Dean of students	
2017	Tunnel	Madam Jeong	
2017	Strongest Deliveryman	Lee Dan-ah's mother	
2018	The Rich Son	Chairman Nam's wife	
2018	Voice	Joo Hye-jung	
2020	Hyena	Baek Hee-joon	
2020	Soul Mechanic	Doctor	
2021	The One Serving House	House owner	
2021	Idol: The Coup	Jang Stella's mother	
2022	The Witch's Game	Jung Min-ja	
2022	Missing: The Other Side 2	Kim Gun-joo	
2023	Brain Works	Choi Jung-yoon	
2023	Divorce Attorney Shin	Park Ji-yeon	
2023	Durian's Affair	Ayla's mother	

=== Film ===
Year	Title	Role	Ref.
1998	The Uprising	Baek Eui-jung	
2003	Garden of Heaven	Kim Young-ja	
2003	Rewind	Ex-girlfriend	
2005	Green Chair	Su-jin	
2011	I Am a Dad	Ji-young	
2014	Mourning Grave	Ah-young's mother	
2016	Seondal: The Man Who Sells the River	Fortune Telling fraud woman	
2019	Svaha: The Sixth Finger	Bodhisattva Yeon-hwa	
2024	I, the Executioner	Current Affairs critic	
2024	Uprising	Jong-ryeo's mother	

== Ambassadorship ==
- 20th Seoul International Alternative Film Arts Festival Ambassador

== Awards and nominations ==
- Blue Dragon Film Awards nominee for Best New Actress in 1998
