= Exit (2019 film) =

2019 South Korean film

- Theatrical release poster
- Hangul: 엑시트
- RR: Eksiteu
- MR: Eksit'ŭ
- Directed by: Lee Sang-geun
- Written by: Lee Sang-geun
- Produced by: Ryoo Seung-wan; Kang Hye-jung; Baek Hyun-ik
- Starring: Jo Jung-suk; Lim Yoona; Go Doo-shim; Park In-hwan; Kim Ji-young
- Cinematography: Kim Il-yeon
- Edited by: Lee Kang-hee
- Music by: Mowg
- Production company: Filmmaker R&K
- Distributed by: CJ Entertainment
- Release date: July 31, 2019
- Running time: 103 minutes
- Country: South Korea
- Language: Korean
- Box office: US$69.5 million

Exit (Korean: 엑시트) is a 2019 South Korean disaster comedy film written and directed by Lee Sang-geun, and starring Jo Jong-suk and Lim Yoona. The film follows the story of a grown man who attempts to reconnect with an old crush, but following a chain of events, they end up trying to escape from a mysterious white gas that threatens to engulf the entire Seoul district.

Exit first premiered in South Korea on July 31, 2019. It was considered a box office success earning over US$69.5 million worldwide, becoming South Korea's third highest-grossing domestic film for 2019. The film also marks Lee Sang-geun's feature film debut as a director, as well as Lim Yoona's first leading role in a film.

== Plot ==
Once one of the best rock climbers in his college years, Yong-nam (Jo Jong-suk) is now a grown man, who is without a job and forced to live with his parents just to get by. Yong-nam is constantly reminded of this fact by his older sister Jung-hyun, who urges him to neaten up and make an impression at their mother's upcoming 70th birthday festivities.

For his mother's birthday, Yong-nam insists they should celebrate it at the Cloud Garden, with Yong-nam secretly knowing that his old crush and fellow ex-rock climber Eui-joo (Lim Yoona) is working there. Yong-nam acts surprised to see Eui-joo and in order to impress her, he lies to her and claims that he now has a successful career, much to her surprise.

Meanwhile a terrorist parks a truck close by to the Cloud Garden and releases a toxic white gas. It quickly spreads to its immediate surroundings, causing mass pandemonium in the city. During this, Eui-joo discovers via a phone call from a close friend, that Yong-nam had lied to her about his job, and she becomes curious as to why.

Oblivious to what is happening outside, Yong-nam's family are shocked to see the converging white gas and urged by Eui-joo, they return to the Cloud Garden but not before Jung-hyun stumbles and is quickly overwhelmed by the gas.

In order to get themselves and Jung-hyun to safety, everyone heads to the roof, but much to their horror, they discover that the door to the roof is locked. With everyone else occupied, Yong-nam proceeds to shatter a window and leap across to the adjacent building. Only equipped with a makeshift harness, Yong-nam manages to scale the Cloud Garden and reach the top of the roof, where he opens the door for his family. Once everyone is assembled on the roof, they manage to hail a passing rescue helicopter with crude SOS signals. However, Yong-nam and Eui-joo are prevented from boarding the helicopter, as their inclusion would exceed the weight limit on the helicopter gondola. Due to the rising gas, they are then forced to wrap themselves up in improvisational safety gear and leave the Cloud Garden to seek higher ground.

Once the two manage to find a suitable building, they proceed to signal to another passing helicopter. However, upon seeing a group of students trapped in a building opposite them, they redirect the helicopter to the students and away from themselves. Then a gas station near by the truck explodes sending a wave of the toxic gas, forcing them to leave the building before they could also be rescued.

After failing to be rescued twice, Yong-nam and Eui-joo realise that the only way to escape the rising gas is to head towards the tower crane, the highest point in the vicinity. At the same time, they are discovered by a drone, which they use to provide directions towards the tower crane.

After running and climbing across numerous buildings, the drone finally loses power, leaving Yong-nam and Eui-joo at a dead end, as they realise that none of the surrounding buildings are close enough to get to the tower crane. Just as they begin to despair, multiple drones begin to converge towards their location, and Yong-nam is able to suspend a rope across the buildings by utilising one of them. Yong-nam and Eui-joo then attempt to swing across, but their combined weight proves too much for the drone, and the two fall, seemingly to their deaths. However, the two manage to survive the fall and reach the tower crane, from where they are eventually extracted from by a rescue helicopter.

Once on safe ground, Yong-nam tearfully reunites with the rest of his family. As Yong-nam and Eui-joo face one another to say goodbye, they agree to see each other again sometime. As they stand smiling, rainfall starts to descend, dissipating the last of the white gas from the city.

== Cast ==
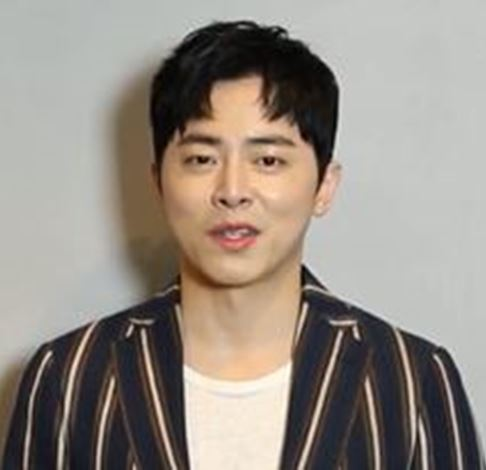
Main actor Jo Jung-suk

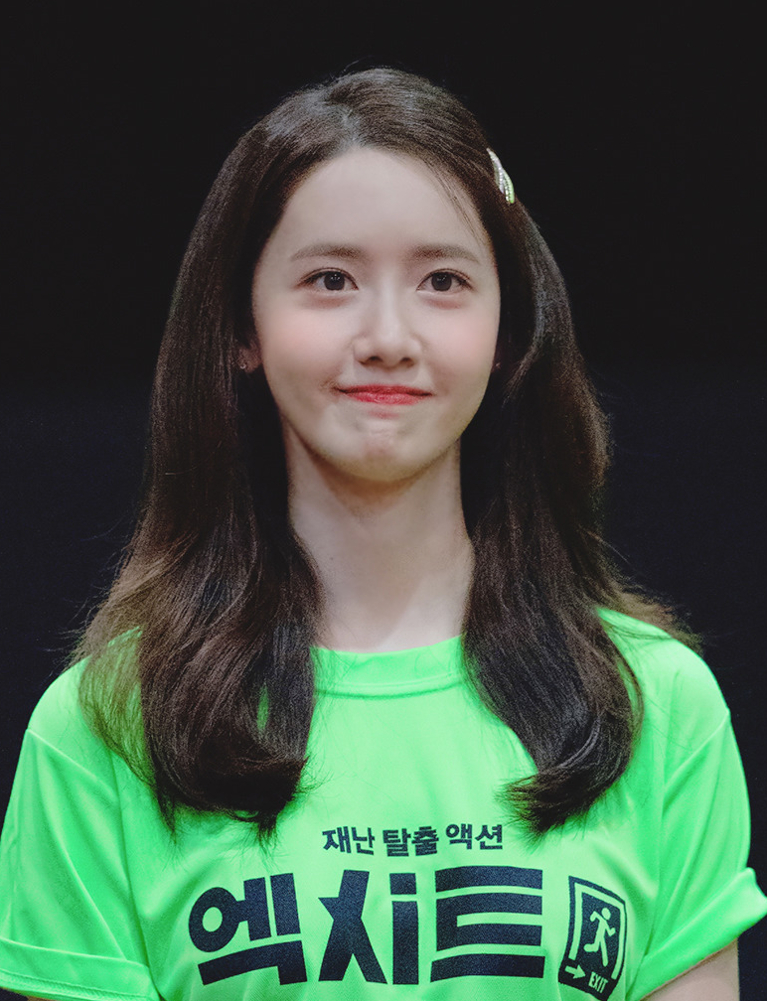
Lim Yoona at the Exit Stage Greeting

- Jo Jong-suk as Lee Yong-nam, a jobless young man who lives with his parents
- Lim Yoona as Eui-joo, Yong-nam's fellow ex-rock climber and love interest from university, who now works at the Cloud Garden
- Go Doo-shim as Hyeon-ok, mother of Yong-nam
- Park In-hwan as Jang-soo, father of Yong-nam
- Kim Ji-young as Jung-hyun, Yong-nam's older sister
- Kang Ki-young as Manager Goo, manager of the Cloud Garden
- Bae Yoo-ram as Yong-min, cousin of Yong-nam
- Yoo Su-bin as Yong-soo, cousin of Yong-nam
- Shin Se-hwi as Yong-hwe, cousin of Yong-nam
- Kim Kang-hoon as Ji-ho, Yong-nam's nephew and son of Jung-hyun
- Lee Bong-ryun as third older sister
- Hwang Hyo-Eun as second older sister

== Production ==
Principal photography began on August 4, 2018, and wrapped on December 12.

== Release ==
Exit was first released in South Korea on July 31, 2019.

The film was selected as the opening film of the 4th London East Asia Film Festival, held from October 24 to November 3, 2019.

== Reception ==
=== Box office ===
Exit was a box office success and proved to be a popular film upon its release.

Despite being released alongside The Divine Fury on July 31, Exit managed to take the No. 1 position at the box office on its premiere, recording an opening day total of 409, 026 admissions. Exit then proceeded to break the record for the fastest movie to reach 1 million moviegoers, reaching the milestone just two days after its initial release. Notably, Exit was only the second Korean film to maintain the No.1 spot at the box office for two successive days in 2019; the critically acclaimed Parasite being the first such film to do so.

Exit maintained a high number of admission sales over the course of the week, surpassing the 2 million admissions mark and 3 million admissions mark, respectively four and six days after its release.

Over the coming weeks, Exit continued to attract a steady number of viewers, reaching the 9 million mark, 36 days after its release.

Eventually, Exit managed to accrue a total of 9,425,294 admissions nationwide, becoming the third highest-selling domestic film in South Korea for 2019, and the sixth highest-selling film for all movies screened in South Korea.

Overall, Exit grossed a worldwide total of US$69,501,772, of which US$67,380,750 was earned from South Korea alone.

=== Critical response ===
The review aggregator Rotten Tomatoes reported an approval rating of 83%, with an average rating of 6/10. One of the critics, Yoon Min-sik of The Korean Herald, described Exit as a "fun, action-packed film" where "for every flaw, the flick had many more enjoyable elements", showing the potential to become ""the" summer blockbuster of the year." Furthermore, Exit was praised for its incorporation of lightheartedness, described as "a new breed of disaster film that has never been seen before" and "a film to be enjoyed by all ages."

In contrast, Carlos Aguilar of the Los Angeles Times was more mixed in his review, pointing towards a lack of originality of the overall story, labelling it a "trite commodity." He commented that despite "the amusing hurdles", Exit was ultimately "a simplistically digestible and ultimately predictable big-budget outing with a slight edge."

=== Accolades ===
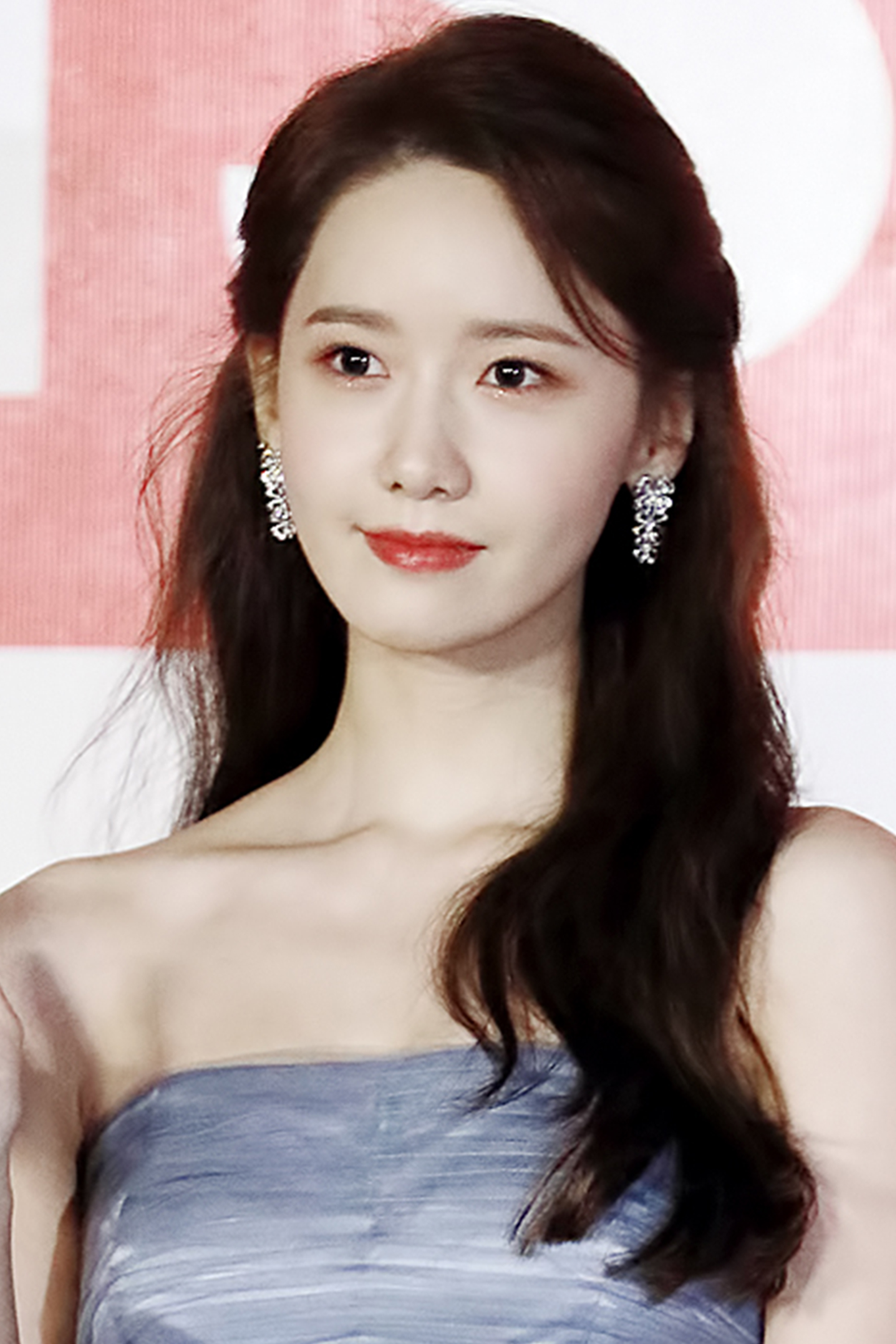
YoonA (Lim Yoona) at the Asia Artist Awards on November 26, 2019

Year	Award	Category	Recipient(s)	Result	Ref.
2019	40th Blue Dragon Film Awards	Best Actor	Jo Jung-suk	Nominated	
2019	40th Blue Dragon Film Awards	Best Actress	Lim Yoona	Nominated	
2019	40th Blue Dragon Film Awards	Popular Star Award	Im Yoon-ah	Won	
2019	40th Blue Dragon Film Awards	Best New Director	Lee Sang-geun	Won	
2019	40th Blue Dragon Film Awards	Best Picture	Exit	Nominated	
2019	40th Blue Dragon Film Awards	Best Cinematography-Lighting	Kim Il-yeon (C.G.K), Kim Min-jae	Nominated	
2019	40th Blue Dragon Film Awards	Best Editing	Lee Gang-hui	Nominated	
2019	40th Blue Dragon Film Awards	Technical Award	Jin Yul-yun (Stunts)	Won	
2019	40th Blue Dragon Film Awards	Best Music	Yeon Ri-mok	Nominated	
2019	28th Buil Film Awards	Most Popular Actress	Im Yoon-ah	Won	
2019	28th Buil Film Awards	Best Supporting Actor	Kang Ki-young	Nominated	
2019	28th Buil Film Awards	Best Screenplay	Lee Sang-geun	Nominated	
2019	39th Korean Association of Film Critics Awards	Critics' Top 10	Exit	Won	
2019	4th International Film Festival and Awards Macao	Variety Asian Stars Up Next Award	Lim Yoona	Won	
2019	4th Asia Artist Awards	Best Artist Award, Actress (Movie)	Lim Yoona	Won	
2019	20th Women in Film Korea Festival	Best New Actress	Im Yoon-ah	Won	
2020	25th Chunsa Film Art Awards	Best New Director	Lee Sang-geun	Nominated	
2020	25th Chunsa Film Art Awards	Best Actor	Jo Jung-suk	Nominated	
2020	25th Chunsa Film Art Awards	Best Actress	Lim Yoona	Nominated	
2020	25th Chunsa Film Art Awards	Best Supporting Actress	Go Doo-shim	Nominated	
2020	25th Chunsa Film Art Awards	Best Screenplay	Lee Sang-geun	Won	
2020	56th Grand Bell Awards	Best New Director	Lee Sang-geun	Nominated	
2020	56th Grand Bell Awards	Best Film Editing	Lee Gang-hui	Won	
2020	56th Grand Bell Awards	Best Planning	Baek Hyeon-ik	Nominated	
2020	56th Grand Bell Awards	Technical Award	Jin Yul-yun (Stunts)	Nominated	
2020	56th Grand Bell Awards	Technical Award	Jung Do-ahn (Visual Effects)	Nominated	
2020	56th Baeksang Arts Awards	Best Film	Exit	Nominated	
2020	56th Baeksang Arts Awards	Best New Director	Lee Sang-geun	Nominated	
2020	56th Baeksang Arts Awards	Best Actor	Jo Jung-suk	Nominated	
2020	56th Baeksang Arts Awards	Best Screenplay	Lee Sang-geun	Won	
2020	56th Baeksang Arts Awards	Technical Award	Exit	Nominated	
2020	22nd Far East Film Festival	White Mulberry Award as Best First Film	Exit	Won	
2021	40th Golden Cinematography Awards	Popularity Award (Note: This award is based on selection by cinematographer.)	Lim Yoona	Won	
2021	Asan Chungmugong International Action Film Festival	Best Actress	Lim Yoona	Won	
