= No Blood No Tears =

- Film poster
- Hangul: 피도 눈물도 없이
- RR: Pido nunmuldo eopsi
- MR: P'ido nunmuldo ŏpsi
- Directed by: Ryoo Seung-wan
- Written by: Ryoo Seung-wan; Jeong Jin-wan
- Produced by: Kim Mi-hee; Kim Seong-je; Kang Woo-suk
- Starring: Jeon Do-yeon; Lee Hye-young; Jung Jae-young
- Cinematography: Choi Young-hwan
- Edited by: Kim Sang-bum; Kim Jae-bum
- Music by: Han Jae-gwon
- Distributed by: Cinema Service
- Release date: March 1, 2002
- Running time: 116 minutes
- Country: South Korea
- Language: Korean
- Box office: US$2.9 million

No Blood No Tears (Korean: 피도 눈물도 없이; RR: Pido nunmuldo eopsi) is a 2002 South Korean crime drama film co-written and directed by Ryoo Seung-wan, starring Jeon Do-yeon, Lee Hye-young, and Jung Jae-young.

== Plot ==
The ill-treated mistress of a gang boss becomes friendly with an older woman who drives a taxi. Eventually the two hatch a plan to steal a bagful of money, taking some revenge in the process.

== Cast ==
- Jeon Do-yeon as Soo-jin
- Lee Hye-young as Gyung-sun
- Jung Jae-young as Dok-bul
- Ryoo Seung-bum as Chae Min-su
- Shin Goo as Kim Geum-bok
- Jung Doo-hong as Silent man
- Baek Il-seob as Chil-sung
- Kim Young-in as Baek-gol
- Baek Chan-ki as Bool-gom
- Lee Young-hoo as Captain Ma-bak
- Kim Su-hyeon as Pretty boy
- Lee Mu-yeong as a manager
- Im Won-hee as Jellyfish
- Ahn Gil-kang as a restaurant owner
- Lee Moon-sik as middle-aged drunk
- Kim Il-woong as a restaurant employee
- Lee Hong-pyo as tracksuit 2
- Gye Sung-yong as Detective Choi
- Bong Joon-ho as a detective
