= Veteran (2015 film) =

2015 film by Ryoo Seung-wan

- Theatrical release poster
- Directed by: Ryoo Seung-wan
- Written by: Ryoo Seung-wan
- Produced by: Cho Sung-min
- Starring: Hwang Jung-min; Yoo Ah-in; Yoo Hae-jin; Oh Dal-su
- Cinematography: Choi Young-hwan
- Edited by: Kim Sang-bum; Kim Jae-bum
- Music by: Bang Jun-seok
- Production companies: Film K; Filmmaker R&K
- Distributed by: CJ Entertainment
- Release date: August 5, 2015
- Running time: 123 minutes
- Country: South Korea
- Language: Korean
- Budget: US$5.1 million
- Box office: US$92 million

Veteran (Korean: 베테랑) is a 2015 South Korean action comedy film written and directed by Ryoo Seung-wan. It drew 13.4 million admissions, making it the 5th all-time highest-grossing film in South Korean cinema history. Veteran also won the Casa Asia Award at the Sitges Film Festival.

A sequel titled I, the Executioner premiered in 2024.

== Plot ==
Seo Do-cheol is a merciless police detective, who investigates the suicide of a truck driver named Bae, where he learns from Bae's son that Jo Tae-oh, the sadistic third-generation heir to powerful conglomerate Sinjin Group has assaulted Bae as the latter protested against the conglomerate for back payment. Do-cheol personally begins the investigation, which enrages Tae-oh. Later, Tae-oh uses his influence to make Do-cheol handle another case. He also tries to bribe Do-cheol's wife with the help of his conglomerate's SVP Choi Dae-woong, but she refuses, where Do-cheol threatens Tae-oh after learning this.

Do-cheol takes the help of a reporter to publish the news, but to no avail. Tae-oh hires a logistics contractor named Jeon to finish off Do-cheol and also makes the Internal Affairs to interrogate him, but he is timely saved by his team leader Oh. Do-cheol escapes from a murder attempt by Jeon, where a detective gets stabbed. Using the opportunity, Do-cheol and his team discover evidence and get approval for the investigation against Tae-oh, but Tae-oh's father and the conglomerate chairman Jo make Dae-woong to take the blame. With his team's help, Do-cheol learns that Bae was killed after he tried to seek revenge for assaulting him and it was made to look like a suicide.

After inquiring of Dae-woong, Do-cheol learns that Tae-oh is planning to escape to Singapore. Before leaving, Tae-oh throws a party where he meets his former girlfriend Jeong Da-hye (who is pregnant with his child) and tries to kill her when she abuses him. Do-cheol forms a plan where they plant a false case against Tae-oh for assaulting his girlfriend, and the cops fight with the bodyguards to arrest him. After an intense car chase, Do-cheol and Tae-oh engage in a hand-to-hand combat where despite brutal injuries, Do-cheol manages to arrest Tae-oh, who is later produced for a trial at the Supreme Court along with Dae-woong, and they are sentenced to prison. In the hospital, Do-cheol recovers from his injuries and soon returns back to duty.

== Cast ==
- Hwang Jung-min as Seo Do-cheol
- Yoo Ah-in as Jo Tae-oh
- Yoo Hae-jin as Choi Dae-woong
- Oh Dal-su as Team leader Oh
- Jang Yoon-ju as Miss Bong
- Kim Shi-hoo as Detective Yoon
- Oh Dae-hwan as Detective Wang
- Jung Woong-in as Driver Bae
- Jung Man-sik as Chief Jeon
- Song Young-chang as Chairman Jo
- Jin Kyung as Joo-yeon
- Yoo In-young as Jeong Da-hye
- Park So-dam as "the youngest"
- Lee Dong-hwi as Yoon Hong-ryeol
- Bae Sung-woo as Used cars business owner
- Chun Ho-jin as Regional investigation unit senior superintendent
- Jang So-yeon as Driver Bae's wife
- Kim Jae-hyeon as Driver Bae's son
- Park Jong-hwan as Team leader Yang
- Uhm Tae-goo as Jo Tae-oh's bodyguard
- Park Ji-hoon as Security manager
- Jo Yeon-hee as Contract worker
- Shin Seung-hwan as Reporter Park
- Yeo Ho-min as Director Kim
- Lee Ye-won as Jo Tae-oh's hair stylist 2
- Park Ji-yoon as News reporter (voice)
- Ahn Gil-kang as Jurisdiction police chief (cameo)
- Ma Dong-seok as Big guy with sportswear (cameo)
- Kim Eung-soo as Adviser Jeong (cameo)

== Box office ==
Veteran opened in South Korea on August 5, 2015. It grossed ₩21.7 billion (US$18.6 million) from 2.75 million admissions over its first five days of release. By November 6, it had grossed US$92,077,504 from 13,411,343 admissions and is currently the 5th all-time highest-grossing film in Korean cinema history.

== Sequel ==
Ryoo Seung-wan and production company Filmmaker R&K confirmed that they agreed to make a sequel, which was supposed to hit theaters within two to three years of announcement. It was reported that Hwang Jung-min and Oh Dal-su will reprise their roles, and actor Jung Hae-in is also being considered to succeed Yoo Ah-in as the antagonist. It began filming as Veteran 2 in December 2022 with the cast of Hwang Jung-min, Oh Dal-su, Jang Yoon-ju, Oh Dae-hwan, and Kim Si-hoo. Titled I, the Executioner, it premiered as a midnight screening at the 2024 Cannes Film Festival.

== Remakes ==
A Chinese remake of the film was announced in 2016. Originally slated for a 2017 release with Sun Honglei in the starring role, The Big Shot was released in 2019 and starred Wang Qianyuan.

An American remake of the film by Michael Mann is currently in development, and will begin production after the release of his film adaptation of Heat 2.

== Awards and nominations ==
Year	Award	Category	Recipient	Result
2015	48th Sitges Film Festival	Casa Asia Award (Asia Focus - Best Film)	Veteran	Won
2015	3rd Marie Claire Asia Star Awards (20th Busan International Film Festival)	Asia Star of the Year	Yoo Ah-in	Won
2015	35th Korean Association of Film Critics Awards	Best Film	Veteran	Nominated
2015	35th Korean Association of Film Critics Awards	Best Director	Ryoo Seung-wan	Won
2015	35th Korean Association of Film Critics Awards	Best Actor	Yoo Ah-in	Nominated
2015	35th Korean Association of Film Critics Awards	Best Screenplay	Ryoo Seung-wan	Nominated
2015	35th Korean Association of Film Critics Awards	Best Cinematography	Choi Young-hwan	Nominated
2015	35th Korean Association of Film Critics Awards	Best Music	Bang Jun-seok	Nominated
2015	35th Korean Association of Film Critics Awards	Top 10 Films of the Year	Veteran	Won
2015	15th Korea World Youth Film Festival	Most Favorite Actor	Yoo Ah-in	Won
2015	15th Korea World Youth Film Festival	Most Favorite Film Director	Ryoo Seung-wan	Won
2015	52nd Grand Bell Awards	Best Film	Veteran	Nominated
2015	52nd Grand Bell Awards	Best Director	Ryoo Seung-wan	Nominated
2015	52nd Grand Bell Awards	Best Actor	Yoo Ah-in	Nominated
2015	52nd Grand Bell Awards	Best Supporting Actor	Yoo Hae-jin	Nominated
2015	52nd Grand Bell Awards	Best Supporting Actress	Jang Yoon-ju	Nominated
2015	52nd Grand Bell Awards	Best New Actress	Jang Yoon-ju	Nominated
2015	52nd Grand Bell Awards	Best Screenplay	Ryoo Seung-wan	Nominated
2015	52nd Grand Bell Awards	Best Cinematography	Choi Young-hwan	Nominated
2015	52nd Grand Bell Awards	Best Editing	Kim Sang-bum, Kim Jae-bum	Nominated
2015	52nd Grand Bell Awards	Best Lighting	Kim Ho-seong	Nominated
2015	52nd Grand Bell Awards	Best Sound Recording	Kim Chang-seop	Nominated
2015	36th Blue Dragon Film Awards	Best Film	Veteran	Nominated
2015	36th Blue Dragon Film Awards	Best Director	Ryoo Seung-wan	Won
2015	36th Blue Dragon Film Awards	Best Actor	Hwang Jung-min	Nominated
2015	36th Blue Dragon Film Awards	Best Supporting Actor	Yoo Hae-jin	Nominated
2015	36th Blue Dragon Film Awards	Best Supporting Actress	Jin Kyung	Nominated
2015	36th Blue Dragon Film Awards	Best Screenplay	Ryoo Seung-wan	Nominated
2015	36th Blue Dragon Film Awards	Best Cinematography-Lighting	Choi Young-hwan, Kim Ho-seong	Nominated
2015	36th Blue Dragon Film Awards	Best Editing	Kim Sang-bum, Kim Jae-bum	Nominated
2015	36th Blue Dragon Film Awards	Best Music	Bang Jun-seok	Nominated
2015	36th Blue Dragon Film Awards	Technical Award	Jung Doo-hong, Jung Yoon-heon (Stunts)	Nominated
2015	Fashionista Awards	Best Male Fashionista in a Movie (First Prize)	Yoo Ah-in	Won
2015	5th SACF Artists of the Year Awards	Artistic Impression in Motion Pictures Award	Yoo Ah-in	Won
2015	The Korea Film Actors Association Awards	Top Star Award	Yoo Ah-in	Won
2015	The Korea Film Actors Association Awards	Top Supporting Acting Award	Jin Kyung	Won
2015	The Korea Film Actors Association Awards	Best Martial Arts Director Award	Jung Doo-hong	Won
2015	16th Busan Film Critics Awards	Best Actor	Yoo Hae-jin	Won
2015	Cine 21 Movie Awards	Best Director	Ryoo Seung-wan	Won
2015	Cine 21 Movie Awards	Best Actor	Yoo Ah-in	Won
2015	2nd Korean Film Producers Association Awards	Best Director	Ryoo Seung-wan	Won
2015	2nd Korean Film Producers Association Awards	Best Cinematography	Choi Young-hwan	Won
2015	2nd Korean Film Producers Association Awards	Best Editing	Kim Sang-bum, Kim Jae-bum	Won
2015	2nd Korean Film Producers Association Awards	Technical Award	Jung Doo-hong, Jung Yoon-heon (Stunts)	Won
2016	7th KOFRA Film Awards	Best Director	Ryoo Seung-wan	Won
2016	11th Max Movie Awards	Best Film	Veteran	Won
2016	11th Max Movie Awards	Best Director	Ryoo Seung-wan	Won
2016	11th Max Movie Awards	Best Actor	Yoo Ah-in	Won
2016	11th Max Movie Awards	Best Supporting Actor	Oh Dal-su	Won
2016	11th Max Movie Awards	Best Supporting Actor	Yoo Hae-jin	Nominated
2016	11th Max Movie Awards	Best Supporting Actress	Jin Kyung	Nominated
2016	11th Max Movie Awards	Best Poster	Veteran	Nominated
2016	10th Asian Film Awards	Best Film	Veteran	Nominated
2016	10th Asian Film Awards	Best Director	Ryoo Seung-wan	Nominated
2016	10th Asian Film Awards	Best Screenplay	Ryoo Seung-wan	Nominated
2016	10th Asian Film Awards	Best Editing	Kim Sang-bum, Kim Jae-bum	Nominated
2016	10th Asian Film Awards	Next Generation Award	Yoo Ah-in	Won
2016	21st Chunsa Film Art Awards	Best Supporting Actor	Oh Dal-su	Nominated
2016	21st Chunsa Film Art Awards	Technical Award	Choi Young-hwan	Nominated
2016	36st Golden Cinematography Awards	Best Actor	Yoo Ah-in	Won
2016	36st Golden Cinematography Awards	Cinematography Award - Gold Prize	Choi Young-hwan	Won
2016	52nd Baeksang Arts Awards	Best Film	Veteran	Nominated
2016	52nd Baeksang Arts Awards	Best Director (Film)	Ryoo Seung-wan	Won
2016	52nd Baeksang Arts Awards	Best Screenplay (Film)	Ryoo Seung-wan	Nominated
2016	52nd Baeksang Arts Awards	Best Actor (Film)	Hwang Jung-min	Nominated
2016	52nd Baeksang Arts Awards	Best Supporting Actor (Film)	Oh Dal-su	Nominated
2016	25th Buil Film Awards	Best Film	Veteran	Won
2016	25th Buil Film Awards	Best Director	Ryoo Seung-wan	Nominated
2016	25th Buil Film Awards	Best Actor	Hwang Jung-min	Nominated
2016	25th Buil Film Awards	Best Screenplay	Ryoo Seung-wan	Nominated
2016	25th Buil Film Awards	Best Cinematography	Choi Young-hwan	Won
2016	25th Buil Film Awards	Best Music	Bang Jun-seok	Nominated
