= Saticöy =

Indie-Rock Band

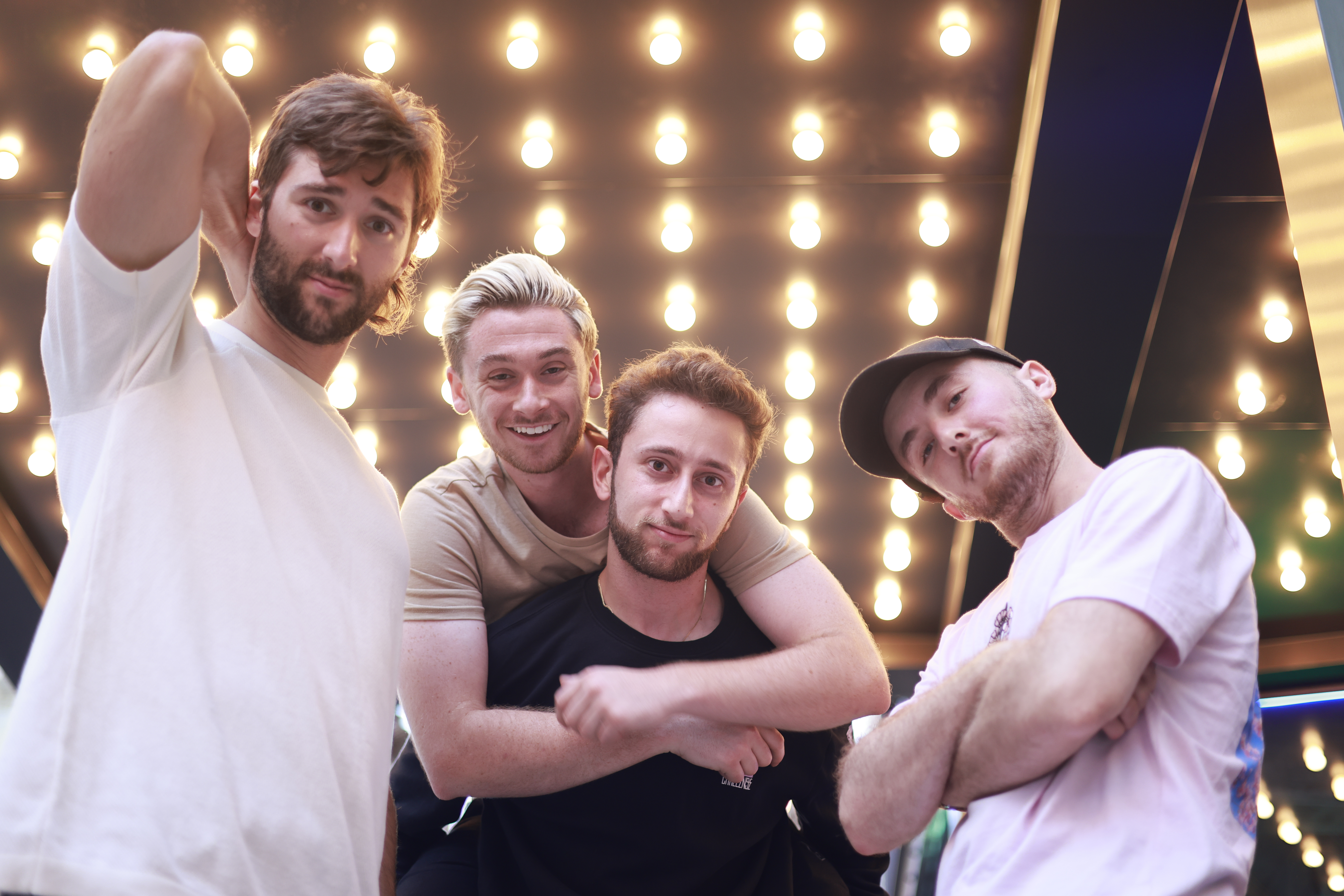
- Saticöy in Los Angeles, 2021

Background information
- Origin: Los Angeles, California
- Genres: Alt-Rock, Rock
- Instruments: vocals, guitar, bass, drums, keyboard, saxophone
- Years active: 2018-present
- Label: Independent
- Members: Derek Long, Jaron Takach, Jonathan Averbook, Tim Greer
- Website: saticoymusic.com

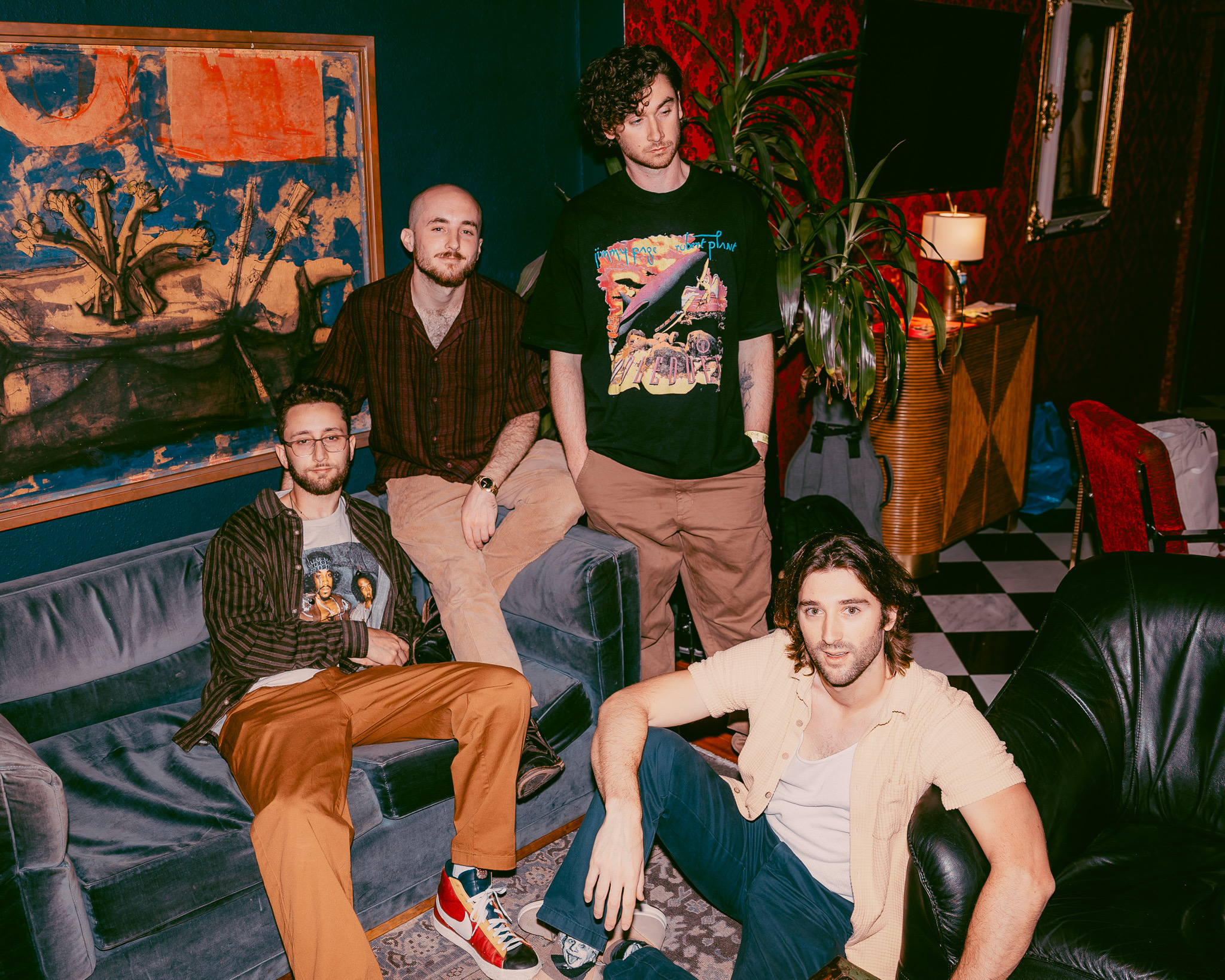
Saticöy - Lodge Room Performance 2023 - Jon Averbook, Derek Long, Jaron Takach, Tim Greer

Saticöy is an alt-rock band from Ohio, currently based in Los Angeles. Its current lineup consists of Derek Long (vocals, guitar), John Takach (drums), Jonathan Averbook (bass) and Tim Greer (keyboard, saxophone).

== History ==
Saticöy was formed in 2018 when Jaron Takach, Derek Long and Jon Averbook moved to Los Angeles to begin their music journey. They had initially met while studying at Ohio University. The name "Saticöy" was derived by adding an umlaut to the name of the North Hollywood street where the band had their first rehearsal space. The band soon added their fourth member, Tim Greer.

Saticöy released their debut single, "Faded From Color," a track that quickly gained traction and amassed millions of streams worldwide across all streaming platforms. "Faded From Color" was nominated for "Best Alternative Song of 2018" at the Hollywood Music in Media Awards.

In 2019, Saticöy debuted "Nice to Know." at The Troubadour in West Hollywood. In 2020, they released several additional singles including "Read Receipts", "Clean It Up", and "Ménage à Moi", and received a Mark Award nomination for "Best Music Production Artist" as well as a nomination for Best Alternative Song of 2020 at the Hollywood Music in Media Awards. In August 2021, Saticöy signed a publishing deal with Universal Production Music Group. They then released their single "Icy Boy" which won "Best Pop Song of 2021" at the Hollywood Music in Media Awards. In May 2022, they released their debut EP, "Crack a Smile," which was praised for its upbeat and positive sound.

In September 2023, Saticöy released a twelve-song album titled "Origami," showcasing a fresh and innovative sound in the alternative rock and punk space. Lead single "Safe Side feat. Connor Musarra" amassed millions of views across social media platforms. "Origami" and its album release show at the Lodge Room were met with critical acclaim.

In 2024, Saticöy parted ways with their publishing deal at Universal Production Music Group and became fully independent.

In 2025, Saticöy released "Sugar Pills," an "alt-rock track that pairs upbeat alt-rock energy with emotionally raw lyrics about the quiet unraveling of a relationship.

Beyond their musical endeavors, Saticöy has been active on social media, where their "Learning Songs in 30 Seconds" series has garnered a following of over 300,000 people with millions of views worldwide. This series showcases the band's musical abilities and connects them with a global audience.

== Placement in Media ==
Saticöy signed to Universal Production Music Group in 2023 and has had music featured in several TV shows and other media.

In 2023, The Boys: Gen V used "Faded From Color" in Season 1, Episode 3.

In 2023, NPR's Planet Money featured "Icy Boy" on their episode "A Very Planet Money Thanksgiving."

In 2024, Netflix's Wonderland trailer featured "Waiting."

== Members ==
- Derek Long - vocals, guitar
- Jaron Takach - drums, production
- Jonathan Averbook - bass
- Tim Greer - keyboard, saxophone
