= Move to Heaven =

2021 South Korean Netflix TV series

- Promotional poster
- Hangul: 무브 투 헤븐: 나는 유품정리사입니다
- Lit.: Move to Heaven: I Am a Keepsake Organizer
- RR: Mubeu tu hebeun: naneun yupum jeongnisaimnida
- MR: Mubŭ t'u hebŭn: nanŭn yup'um chŏngnisaimnida
- Genre: Drama
- Written by: Yoon Ji-ryeon
- Directed by: Kim Sung-ho
- Starring: Lee Je-hoon; Tang Jun-sang; Hong Seung-hee
- Country of origin: South Korea
- Original language: Korean
- No. of episodes: 10

Production
- Producers: Chung Jae-yun; Kim Mi-na
- Camera setup: Multi camera
- Running time: 44–62 minutes
- Production companies: Page One Film; Number Three Pictures

Original release
- Network: Netflix
- Release: May 14, 2021

Move to Heaven (Korean: 무브 투 헤븐: 나는 유품정리사입니다) is a 2021 South Korean television series directed by Kim Sung-ho and written by Yoon Ji-ryeon. It is an original Netflix series, starring Lee Je-hoon, Tang Jun-sang, and Hong Seung-hee. The series follows Geu-ru (Tang Joon-sang), a young man with Asperger's, and Sang-gu (Lee Je-hoon), his guardian. Working as trauma cleaners, they uncover untold stories. It was released worldwide by Netflix on May 14, 2021.

== Synopsis ==
Geu-ru (Tang Jun-sang), who has Asperger syndrome, and his ex-convict uncle Sang-gu (Lee Je-hoon) meet for the first time after the sudden death of Geu-ru's father. Entrusted as Geu-ru's guardian, Sang-gu joins his nephew to help run the family trauma cleaning company "Move to Heaven", where in the course of business they uncover untold stories about the deceased while Sang-gu tries to deal with his painful past with Geu-ru's father as well as the traumatic incident that landed him in jail.

== Cast ==
=== Main ===
- Lee Je-hoon as Cho Sang-gu
  - Jin Yu-chan as young Sang-Gu

an ex-convict and Geu-ru's estranged uncle who becomes his guardian upon release from jail. He is blunt, smokes cigarettes, and moonlights as an underground MMA fighter. He was sent to jail after putting his protégé Su-cheol into a coma during a fight. Despite his background, he is still entrusted to take care of Geu-ru after his release, and is instructed to stay and work with Geu-ru for a three-month probationary period. Although he initially does so for financial gain, and appears to be ignorant of Geu-ru's condition, he slowly gets to know Geu-ru as they both work together as trauma cleaners for Move to Heaven, gaining a new outlook on life and allowing him to discover the truth about his half-brother and Geu-ru's father Jeong-woo, whom he mistakenly thought had abandoned him when he was still very young.

- Tang Jun-sang as Han Geu-ru
  - Jang Ho-jun as young Geu-ru

a 20-year-old with Asperger syndrome, as signified in the dialogue, who works as a trauma cleaner for Move to Heaven, over which he took following his father's death. He is highly intelligent and extremely logical, and has an incredible memory, which allows him to uncover untold stories about the deceased through the collection of their important personal belongings. Following his father's practise, Geu-ru places the deceased's most important belongings in a yellow box, which he always insists on handing over to the next of kin; if they cannot be readily found or are unwilling to receive the box, Geu-ru always tries to find a way to pass it on regardless, often to Sang-gu's consternation. Geu-ru also has a minor obsession with fish and marine life, since his parents regularly brought him to a giant aquarium as a child, and he continues to do so as an adult. When he feels panicked, Geu-ru recites facts about fish in order to calm himself. Despite his condition, there are a lot of people surrounding him who understand his situation and try their best to help him and comfort him.

- Hong Seung-hee as Yoon Na-mu

Geu-ru's best friend and neighbour who joins and helps him run Move to Heaven after she becomes suspicious of Sang-gu's sudden presence in Geu-ru's life. However, her mother disapproves of her working as a trauma cleaner, so she does so in secret. She has been fond and protective of Geu-ru since they first met when they were kids and is willing to take good care of him.

=== Supporting ===
- Ji Jin-hee as Han Jeong-woo
  - Ahn Ji-ho as teen Jeong-woo

Geu-ru's father and Sang-gu's older half-brother from the same mother. He was the founder and owner of Move to Heaven before his sudden death from cardiac arrest. Previously a firefighter in Busan, he rescued an abandoned infant, whom he and his wife later adopted and named Geu-ru. After her death, he taught Geu-ru everything about life and his job as a trauma cleaner, but kept his heart condition secret from him. He also treated Sang-gu like his own brother, but after Sang-gu's father died and Jeong-woo inadvertently abandoned him, they became estranged until Su-cheol tried to reunite them at his last fight. Although Sang-gu refuses to see him when he tries to visit him in jail, Jeong-woo still entrusts his son's future care with him.

- Kim Ju-yeon as Min Ji-won

Jeong-woo's wife and Geu-ru's mother, who died from cancer when he was a child.

- Lee Moon-sik as Park Joo-taek

a waste disposal truck driver and a friend of Jeong-woo. He is a close partner of Move to Heaven who helps them collect the unusable garbage left by the deceased. A North Korean defector, he is amazed by Move to Heaven's work and always prioritized them when they need his service.

- Im Won-hee as Oh Hyun-chang

a lawyer and a partner of Move to Heaven. He was assigned by Jeong-woo to contact Sang-gu when he got discharged from prison and explains to Geu-ru and Na-mu the guardianship arrangement with Sang-gu.

- Hongseok as Park Jun-yeong

a policeman and friend of Han Geu-ru and Yoon Na-mu. He is usually seen attending crime scenes where clean up by Move to Heaven is required, and is their first contact when the pair needs the help of the police. Like Na-mu, he understands Geu-ru's condition and tries his best to help him. It is hinted that he has feelings toward Yoon Na-mu.

- Jung Young-joo as Oh Mi-ran

Na-mu's mother. She runs a small takeaway shop, located against Move to Heaven, with her husband. She disapproves of both her daughter's friendship with Geu-ru and her working for Move to Heaven.

- Lee Jae-wook as Kim Su-cheol

Sang-gu's friend and protégé. 10 years ago, Sang-gu helped him out when he was beaten up by street thugs, inspiring Su-cheol to become a fighter and eventually becoming a champion boxer himself. After several years, he told Sang-gu that he wanted to retire from boxing so he could start a new life running a supply shop with his father and sister. He willingly participated in a rigged underground MMA fight against Sang-gu in order to get the money he needed. During the fight, after Su-cheol refused to concede, Sang-gu violently knocked him out, putting him into coma, and Sang-gu was sent to jail for it. Sang-gu visits a still-comatose Su-cheol in hospital after his release, but he dies soon after. Sang-gu later discovers Su-cheol was suffering from CTE, which was his real reason for retirement.

- Park Jung-won as Kim Su-jin

Su-cheol's younger sister.

- Jung Ae-youn as Madam Jung

an associate of Sang-gu and an underground MMA fight organizer. She organized the fight between him and Su-cheol and, after his release from jail, persuades Sang-gu to continue fighting for her.

- Choi Soo-young as Son Woo-rim

a social worker who helps lonely citizens who don't have any other family. She first crosses paths with Move to Heaven when they attend to the home of an elderly couple who have committed suicide together, and later contacts them to take care of Matthew Green's belongings. Sang-gu appears to have a crush on her.

=== Special appearances ===
- Shin Soo-oh as Kim Yong-woo

a murder suspect. (Episode 4)

- Yoon Ji-hye as Lee Ju-yeong

a public prosecutor. (Episodes 4 and 10)

- Kwon Soo-hyun as Soo-hyun

a doctor. (Episode 5)

- Lee Ki-young as Soo-hyun's father

a decorated military officer. (Episode 5)

- Jung Dong-hwan as Kim In-su

an elderly man who commits suicide alongside his wife. (Episode 6)

- Han Seo-jin as Min-ji

a young girl. (Episode 6)

- Yoon Joo-sang as Chairman No. (Episode 6)
- Yoo Sun as Kang Eun-jeong

a newscaster. When she was a teenager, her parents fostered Korean children who were to be adopted by overseas couples. (Episode 9)

- Kevin Oh as Matthew Green

a deportee from the United States looking for his birth mother, whom he believes to be Kang Eun-jeong. His birth name is Kang Seong-min. (Episode 9)

- Lee Re as "butterfly girl". (Episode 10)

== Production ==
=== Development and background ===
The plot was inspired by an essay book entitled "Things Left Behind" by Kim Sae-byul, a "trauma cleaner" — cleaners who specialized in cleaning up after godoksa, deceased who died alone and isolated to the point where they are only discovered days later when their corpse decomposes. Writer Yoon Ji-ryeon first came across the book in 2015 and contacted Kim. She followed him on one of his jobs to witness it first-hand and found herself speculating about how the deceased person lived their life as she watched Kim pack up the person's belongings.

In September 2019, it was reported that Kim Sung-ho would direct the series for Netflix.

=== Casting ===
On 17 December 2019, Netflix confirmed the lead casting of Lee Je-hoon and Tang Jun-sang for the series. On June 3, 2020, Netflix confirmed that Ji Jin-hee, Lee Jae-wook and Hong Seung-hee are to join the cast of the series.

=== Filming ===
As the infection due to COVID-19 pandemic was reported, the production of Move to Heaven, along with other Netflix original dramas, was stopped in late August 2020. On February 25, 2021, Netflix announced its future plans and time line for forthcoming projects including Move to Heaven. On February 25, 2021, new stills from the TV series were released.

== Episodes ==
| No. | Title | Directed by | Written by | Original release date |
|---|---|---|---|---|
| 1 | "Episode 1" | Kim Sung-ho | Yoon Ji-ryeon | May 14, 2021 |
A factory intern's fatal injury brings Han Jeong-u and Han Geu-ru to his room, where his goals for the future and love for his parents come into view.
| 2 | "Episode 2" | Kim Sung-ho | Yoon Ji-ryeon | May 14, 2021 |
Cho Sang-gu moves in as Geu-ru's legal guardian and new colleague. Geu-ru searches for a mother's message in her stash of cash and bank receipts.
| 3 | "Episode 3" | Kim Sung-ho | Yoon Ji-ryeon | May 14, 2021 |
A suit store owner reveals a mother's longstanding wish. Sang-gu is reminded of his costly promise. The trauma cleaners arrive at a bloody crime scene.
| 4 | "Episode 4" | Kim Sung-ho | Yoon Ji-ryeon | May 14, 2021 |
A user manual for a device unseen at the crime scene keeps Geu-ru up at night. Geu-ru then found incriminating evidence which led to a conviction of the victim supposed boyfriend which amazes the prosecuting lawyer at Geu-ru's ability to remember her name card. Sang-gu recalls the beating that his mother suffered while cleaning the house of the stabbing and later Sang-gu was told that he must make a loan payment by putting up either cash or his fists.
| 5 | "Episode 5" | Kim Sung-ho | Yoon Ji-ryeon | May 14, 2021 |
The trauma cleaners search for the loved one of a slain doctor to hand-deliver a box full of regrets, hopes and an unrealized future for two.
| 6 | "Episode 6" | Kim Sung-ho | Yoon Ji-ryeon | May 14, 2021 |
Sang-gu and Geu-ru try to give a proper sendoff to a doting couple who called Move to Heaven after deciding to leave the world together hand in hand.
| 7 | "Episode 7" | Kim Sung-ho | Yoon Ji-ryeon | May 14, 2021 |
Sang-gu begrudgingly took Kim Su-cheol under his wing 10 years ago, unaware that his mentorship would bloom into brotherhood and end in destruction.
| 8 | "Episode 8" | Kim Sung-ho | Yoon Ji-ryeon | May 14, 2021 |
Sang-gu is coerced into signing up for a fight in exchange for Geu-ru and the house deed. On a special day, Geu-ru leads Sang-gu down memory lane.
| 9 | "Episode 9" | Kim Sung-ho | Yoon Ji-ryeon | May 14, 2021 |
Matthew Green's search for his birth mother ends with a heartbreaking misunderstanding. Sang-gu sets out to enter his final fight.
| 10 | "Episode 10" | Kim Sung-ho | Yoon Ji-ryeon | May 14, 2021 |
Not yet ready to let Jeong-u go, Geu-ru runs away from home. As their cohabitation comes to an end, Sang-gu's qualification as a guardian is determined.

== Release ==
The series was released on Netflix on May 14, 2021. All 10 episodes, each with running time of around 45 to 60 minutes, are available for streaming. It became the 11th South Korean Netflix original series released on Netflix.

== Reception ==
Greg Wheeler of The Review Geek, rating the series 9 out of 10, opined that the series is a beautiful message conveyed through unique characters. Wheeler praised the performance of Tang Jun-sang, writing "Tang Joon-Sang's acting is nothing short of extraordinary..." He also praised the soundtrack and wrote that it was "absolutely on-point." In summary he said, "With excellent acting, tightly written chapters and a careful, respectful and empowering view on death, Move to Heaven is a cleverly written and unique Korean drama", and concluded by saying that the show was an "...absolute must-watch this year. Just be sure to have a pack of tissues ready to catch those tears!". Rhian Daly of NME also praised the series, awarding it 5 out of 5 stars and called it a contender for one of 2021's best shows.

== Awards and nominations ==
Name of the award ceremony, year presented, category, nominee of the award, and the result of the nomination
| Award ceremony | Year | Category | Nominee | Result | Ref. |
|---|---|---|---|---|---|
| APAN Star Awards | 2022 | Best New Actor | Tang Jun-sang | Won | |
| Asia Contents Awards & Global OTT Awards | 2021 | Best Creative Award | Move to Heaven | Won | |
| Asia Contents Awards & Global OTT Awards | 2021 | Best Actor Award | Lee Je-hoon | Won | |
| Asia Contents Awards & Global OTT Awards | 2021 | Best Writer Award | Yoon Ji-ryeon | Won | |
| Asia Contents Awards & Global OTT Awards | 2021 | Best OTT Original | Move to Heaven | Nominated | |
| Asia Contents Awards & Global OTT Awards | 2021 | Creative Beyond Border | Move to Heaven | Nominated | |
| Asia Contents Awards & Global OTT Awards | 2021 | Best Newcomer – Actor | Tang Jun-sang | Nominated | |
| Asian Academy Creative Awards | 2021 | Best Actor in a Leading Role | Lee Je-hoon | Won | |
| Asian Academy Creative Awards | 2021 | Best Drama Series | Move to Heaven | Won | |
| Blue Dragon Series Awards | 2022 | Best Actor | Lee Je-hoon | Nominated | |
| Director's Cut Awards | 2022 | Best Director | Kim Sung-ho | Nominated | |
| Director's Cut Awards | 2022 | Best Screenplay | Yoon Ji-ryeon | Nominated | |

=== Rankings ===
Name of publisher, year listed, name of listicle, and placement
| Publisher | Year | List | Placement | Ref. |
|---|---|---|---|---|
| NME | 2021 | The 10 best Korean dramas of 2021 | 3rd | |
