= Seo Seong-gyeong =

South Korean art director

- Born: South Korea
- Occupation: Art director
- Years active: 2009 - present
- Employer: Studio Ludens

Korean name
- Hangul: 서성경
- RR: Seo Seonggyeong
- MR: Sŏ Sŏnggyŏng

Seo Seong-gyeong (Korean: 서성경) is a South Korean art director. She is known for her work in film Svaha: The Sixth Finger (2019), Wonderland (2024) and Exhuma (2024).

== Career ==
Initially a graphic designer, Seo transitioned into film after completing a graduate thesis linking traditional Joseon genre paintings to film aesthetics. After further training at the Hankyoreh Cultural Center, she made her industry debut with the 2009 film Running Turtle. Her subsequent credits include serving as art team leader for the period action film Assassination. She made her debut as production designer in film Ordinary Person.

Seo and her team took part as production designer of Netflix Series Can This Love Be Translated? (2026). Including designing interior of Joo Ho-jin's house.

== Filmography ==
=== Films ===
Film credits
Year	Title		Director	Note	Ref.
Year	English	Korean	Director	Note	Ref.
2009	Running Turtle	거북이 달린다	Lee Yeon-woo	Art team	
2010	Death Bell 2: Bloody Camp	고死 두 번째 이야기: 교생실습	Yoo Seon-dong	Art team	
2010	The Servant	방자전	Kim Dae-woo	Set dresser	
2012	Southbound	남쪽으로 튀어	Yim Soon-rye	Art team	
2013	Way Back Home	집으로 가는 길	Bang Eun-jin	Art team	
2014	Whistle Blower	제보자	Yim Soon-rye	Art team	
2015	Assassination	암살	Choi Dong-hoon	Art team	
2017	Ordinary Person	보통사람	Kim Bong-han	Art director	
2019	Svaha: The Sixth Finger	사바하	Jang Jae-hyun	Art director	
2019	Crazy Romance	가장 보통의 연애	Kim Han-gyul	Art director	
2020	#Alive	#살아있다	Cho Il-hyung	Art director	
2024	Wonderland	원더랜드	Kim Tae-yong	Art director	
2024	Exhuma	파묘	Jang Jae-hyun	Art director	

=== Television ===
Television credits
Year	Title		Director	Note	Ref.
Year	English	Korean	Director	Note	Ref.
2022	Money Heist: Korea – Joint Economic Area	종이의 집: 공동경제구역	Kim Hong-sun	Art director	
2026	Can This Love Be Translated?	이 사랑 통역 되나요?	Yoo Young-eun	Art director	

== Awards and nominations ==
Awards and nominations received by Jo
Award ceremony	Year	Category	Nominee / Work	Result	Ref.
Asian Film Awards	2025	Best Production Design	Exhuma	Nominated	
Blue Dragon Film Awards	2024	Best Art Direction	Exhuma	Won	
Blue Dragon Film Awards	2024	Best Art Direction	Wonderland	Nominated	
Buil Film Awards	2024	Best Art/Technical Award	Exhuma	Nominated	
Grand Bell Awards	2020	Best Art Direction	Svaha: The Sixth Finger	Won	
Korean Film Producers Association Awards	2024	Art Award	Exhuma and Wonderland	Won	
