= Handsome Guys =

2024 South Korean film by Nam Dong-hyup

- Theatrical release poster
- Hangul: 핸섬가이즈
- Lit.: Handsome Guys
- RR: Haenseom gaijeu
- MR: Haensŏm kaijŭ
- Directed by: Nam Dong-hyup
- Screenplay by: Nam Dong-hyup
- Based on: Tucker & Dale vs. Evil by Eli Craig
- Starring: Lee Sung-min; Lee Hee-joon; Gong Seung-yeon; Park Ji-hwan; Lee Kyu-hyung
- Cinematography: Yang Hyun-suk
- Edited by: Kim Seon-min
- Music by: Kim Ji-hye
- Production company: Hive Media Corp.
- Distributed by: Next Entertainment World
- Release date: 26 June 2024
- Running time: 101 minutes
- Country: South Korea
- Language: Korean
- Budget: $3.3 million
- Box office: $14.4 million

Handsome Guys (Korean: 핸섬가이즈) is a 2024 South Korean comedy horror film written and directed by Nam Dong-hyup, starring Lee Sung-min, Lee Hee-joon, Gong Seung-yeon, Park Ji-hwan, and Lee Kyu-hyung. It is a remake of the 2010 American horror-comedy film Tucker & Dale vs. Evil. The film was released theatrically on June 26, 2024.

== Plot ==
Jae-pil and Sang-goo leave an unforgettable first impression from their first day of moving in. They become the subject of special surveillance by local police officers Chief Choi and Nam Dong-yoon. Despite this, they are just happy to have a fresh start in their European-style dream house.

However, the happiness is short-lived when they try to save Mi-na from almost drowning. Instead, they end up being mistaken for kidnappers. Meanwhile, a dark atmosphere begins to surround the house as uninvited guests come to look for Mi-na, and the evil spirit that was sealed in the basement awakens.

== Cast ==
- Lee Sung-min as Kang Jae-pil
- Lee Hee-joon as Park Sang-goo
- Gong Seung-yeon as Kim Mi-na
- Park Ji-hwan as Chief Choi
- Lee Kyu-hyung as Officer Nam Dong-yoon
- Woo Hyun as Father Kim
- Jang Dong-joo as Lee Seong-bin
- Kim Do-hoon as Jason
- Bin Chan-wook as Kang Yong-jun
- Park Jeong-hwa as Bo-ra
- Kang Ki-doong as Byeong-jo
- Park Kyung-hye as Sun-ok
- Lee Seo-hwan as real estate president
- Song Yoo-hyun as a Nun
- Jamie Horan as Father Baker
- Jin Tae-geon as Yohan
- Im Won-hee as Lee Won-hee

== Release ==
Handsome Guys was originally scheduled to be released in 2021, but it was delayed by three years. Initial reports after filming began suggested that it would be released in 2021.

The film was displayed along with Hidden Face (2024), The Plot (2024), and Land of Happiness (2024) at the Contents Panda booth at the 2023 Asian Contents & Film Market. It was also invited to the Panorama section of the 57th Sitges Film Festival.

== Accolades ==
Award	Year	Category	Recipient(s)	Result	Ref.
Baeksang Arts Awards	2025	Best New Director	Nam Dong-hyup	Nominated	
Baeksang Arts Awards	2025	Best Actor	Lee Hee-joon	Nominated	
Baeksang Arts Awards	2025	Best Supporting Actress	Gong Seung-yeon	Nominated	
Blue Dragon Film Awards	2024	Best Film	Handsome Guys	Nominated	
Blue Dragon Film Awards	2024	Best Actor	Lee Sung-min	Nominated	
Blue Dragon Film Awards	2024	Best Supporting Actor	Lee Hee-joon	Nominated	
Blue Dragon Film Awards	2024	Best Supporting Actress	Gong Seung-yeon	Nominated	
Blue Dragon Film Awards	2024	Best New Director	Nam Dong-hyup	Nominated	
Blue Dragon Film Awards	2024	Best Screenplay	Nam Dong-hyup	Nominated	
Blue Dragon Film Awards	2024	Best Editing	Kim Sun-min	Nominated	
Buil Film Awards	2024	Best Actor	Lee Hee-joon	Nominated	
Buil Film Awards	2024	Best Supporting Actor	Park Ji-hwan	Nominated	
Buil Film Awards	2024	Best New Director	Nam Dong-hyup	Nominated	
Director's Cut Awards	2025	Best Director (Film)	Nam Dong-hyup	Nominated	
Director's Cut Awards	2025	Best New Director (Film)	Nam Dong-hyup	Won	
