= Escape (2024 South Korean film) =

2024 South Korean film by Lee Jong-pil

- Theatrical release poster
- Hangul: 탈주
- Hanja: 脫走
- RR: Talju
- MR: T'alchu
- Directed by: Lee Jong-pil
- Written by: Kwon Seong-hwi; Kim Woo-geun
- Produced by: Park Eun-kyung; Hong Jeong-in; Kang Dae-wook; Kim Woo-sung
- Starring: Lee Je-hoon; Koo Kyo-hwan; Hong Xa-bin
- Cinematography: Kim Sung-an
- Edited by: Lee Kang-hee
- Music by: Dalpalan
- Production companies: Fox International Productions; The Lamp Ltd.; Eunhasu Film
- Distributed by: Plus M Entertainment
- Release date: July 3, 2024
- Running time: 94 minutes
- Country: South Korea
- Language: Korean
- Box office: US$18.5 million

Escape (Korean: 탈주) is a 2024 South Korean action thriller film directed by Lee Jong-pil and starring Lee Je-hoon, Koo Kyo-hwan and Hong Xa-bin. The film depicts the life-threatening defection and chase of Lim Gyu-nam, a North Korean soldier who dreams of a life with a tomorrow on the other side of the barbed-wire fence, and Hyeon-sang, a North Korean State Security officer who must stop him. It was released on July 3, 2024.

== Plot ==
Near the Korean Demilitarized Zone, Sergeant Lim Gyu-nam of the Korean People's Army, who is about to be discharged after 10 years of service, prepares to defect from North Korea to South Korea, due to disillusionment with the regime. However, lower-ranking soldier Kim Dong-hyuk, who discovers Gyu-nam's plan, attempts to escape first, and Gyu-nam, who tries to stop him, is suddenly arrested as a deserter.

Major Li Hyeon-sang of the Ministry of State Security who came to the unit to investigate a deserter, turns Gyu-nam, whom he had known since childhood, into a hero for his efforts to apprehend a deserter, and gives him a position as a direct assistant to the division commander, assisting him with his life. However, when Gyu-nam makes a full-scale escape along with Dong-hyuk, Hyeon-sang begins a pursuit with no way to back down. As Gyu-nam and Dong-hyuk make their escape, Dong-hyuk is injured. With little hope of finishing the journey, Dong-Hyuk hands his sister's necklace to Gyu-nam and requests Gyu-nam give it to her just before he is shot by Major Li Hyeon. Major Li Hyeon is delayed in his pursuit as Gyu-nam crosses a mine field. As dawn breaks, Gyu-nam sees a squad of South Korean patrol troops. Realising that he is near to South Korea, he approaches them. However, he is stopped by Major Li, who holds Gyu-nam at gunpoint and says that life in South Korea is a failure. Gyu-nam declares he would rather fail every day in South Korea than be unable to fail in North Korea. The two fight, and Gyu-nam gains the advantage, before running towards a telephone and calling the South Korean soldiers of JSA, telling them about his wish to defect.

Gyu-nam then rushes toward a tunnel that heads towards the DMZ and to South Korea. As he runs, he is shot by Major Li multiple times. Determined to escape, Gyu-nam crawls towards a white line that symbolises the North and South Korean border. As Major Li hesitates to kill Gyu-nam, South Korean troops arrive, forcing Major Li to leave. Gyu-nam notices that his hands are on the White Line - he is now officially in South Korea. Gyu-nam is then asked by a South Korean soldier if he had radioed for defection. With Gyu-nam responding affirmatively, the South Koreans rescue him.

One year later, Gyu-nam is sitting inside his apartment, writing a business proposal letter, planning to travel abroad. A few days later, he meets Dong-hyuk's mother and sister, passing them the family necklace and sharing some moments with Dong-hyuk while they were serving in the North. The film ends with Gyu-nam, now a free man, listening to a podcast. He receives a message informing him of the approval of his business proposal. Seeing this, he smiles and walks while watching the skyline.

== Cast ==
- Lee Je-hoon as Sergeant First Class Lim Gyu-nam, a North Korean soldier who dreams of a new life in the South, away from the North where the future is predetermined.
- Koo Kyo-hwan as Major Lee Hyun-sang, an officer of North Korea's National Security Department, an intelligence department, who initially promoted Gyu-nam for apprehending a deserter but now leads a pursuit.
- Hong Xa-bin as Kim Dong-hyuk, a low-ranking soldier who dreams of escaping like Gyu-nam, but was apprehended.
- Seo Hyun-woo as Major Cha, the head of the police department in charge of the 1st Division's battlefield area.
- Lee Sung-wook as First Lieutenant Hong, a military officer belonging to the Ministry of Police in charge of the battalion.
- Jung Joon-won as Second Lieutenant Park Jun-pyeong.
- Park Yoon-hee as Director of the General Political Bureau.
- Song Kang as Seon Woo-min
- Esom as nomad leader
- Lee Ho-jung as wandering rifle girl
- Hyun Ji Shin as nomad
- Jang Young-nam as Dong-hyuk's mother
- Bae Cheol-soo as himself

== Soundtrack ==
In the film, Major Li Hyeon-sang turns out to have won international piano competitions, but chooses the military career because he is the son of a general trying to survive in the regime. According to the closing credits accompanied by Zion.T's 2014 digital single "Yanghwa Bridge", these are the classical music that have appeared in the movie:

- Johann Strauss II's Wener Blut Op. 354
- Dmitri Shostakovich's Dances of the Dolls - 1. Lyric Waltz
- Sergei Rachmaninoff's Prelude in G minor Op. 23 No. 5 & Piano Concerto No. 2 Op 18
- Frédéric Chopin's Waltz in B minor, Op. 69, No. 2

== Accolades ==
Award ceremony	Year	Category	Nominee	Result	Ref.
Baeksang Arts Awards	2025	Best Director	Lee Jong-pil	Nominated	
Baeksang Arts Awards	2025	Best Supporting Actor	Koo Kyo-hwan	Nominated	
Blue Dragon Film Awards	2024	Best Director	Lee Jong-pil	Nominated	
Blue Dragon Film Awards	2024	Best Actor	Lee Je-hoon	Nominated	
Blue Dragon Film Awards	2024	Best Supporting Actor	Koo Kyo-hwan	Nominated	
Blue Dragon Film Awards	2024	Best Editing	Lee Gang-hee	Nominated	
Blue Dragon Film Awards	2024	Best Cinematography and Lighting	Kim Sung-an and Lee Seung-bin	Nominated	
Blue Dragon Film Awards	2024	Best Art Direction	Bae Jung-yoon	Nominated	
Blue Dragon Film Awards	2024	Best Music	Dalpalan	Nominated	
