= Chief Detective 1958 =

2024 South Korean television series

- Promotional poster
- Also known as: Chief Inspector: The Beginning
- Hangul: 수사반장 1958
- Hanja: 搜査班長 1958
- RR: Susabanjang 1958
- MR: Susabanjang 1958
- Genre: Period drama; Crime; Comedy; Action
- Created by: Park Jae-beom
- Developed by: Jang Jae-hoon; Hong Seok-woo
- Written by: Kim Young-shin
- Directed by: Kim Sung-hoon
- Starring: Lee Je-hoon; Lee Dong-hwi; Choi Woo-sung; Yoon Hyun-soo
- Music by: Kim Woo-geun
- Country of origin: South Korea
- Original language: Korean
- No. of episodes: 10

Production
- Executive producers: Bang Ok-kyung; Yoon Suk-dong
- Producers: Ahn Eun-mi; Yoon Hong-mi; Kim Ji-ha; Ji Hwan
- Cinematography: Kim Hyung-suk; Yang Hee-jin
- Editor: Shin Min-kyung
- Production company: Barunson Studio

Original release
- Network: MBC TV
- Release: April 19 – May 18, 2024

Related
- Chief Inspector

Chief Detective 1958 (Korean: 수사반장 1958) is a 2024 South Korean television series written by Kim Young-shin, directed by Kim Sung-hoon, and starring Lee Je-hoon, Lee Dong-hwi, Choi Woo-sung and Yoon Hyun-soo. As a prequel of the series Chief Inspector, it depicts a retro crime investigation drama with the romance and joy of analog investigation, where crimes are solved solely with innate sense, insight, and tenacity without profiling or the common use of CCTV. It aired on MBC TV from April 19, to May 18, 2024, every Friday and Saturday at 21:50 (KST). It is also available for streaming on Disney+ in selected regions. the series also mark last work of Choi Bool-am during his lifetime.

== Synopsis ==
Set in the 1950s to 1960s, ten years before the original series, the story follows Detective Park Yeong-han, who specializes in apprehending petty thieves, teams up with three unique colleagues to break down the absurdities of corrupt power with common sense, and is reborn as a detective for the people.

== Cast and characters ==
=== Main ===
- Lee Je-hoon as Park Yeong-han
  - as Park Jun-seo - Park Young-han's grandson

A detective who is angry and struggling against the reality that tramples on human dignity.

- Lee Dong-hwi as Kim Sang-sun

A detective at Jongnam Police Station who is called Mad Dog.

- Choi Woo-sung as Jo Gyeong-hwan

A wealthy and polite detective at Jongnam Police Station.

- Yoon Hyun-soo as Seo Ho-jeong

A high-spec elite who dreams of becoming a master investigator at Jongnam Police Station.

- Seo Eun-soo as Lee Hye-ju

An owner of a bookstore called Jongnam Seorim, located near Jongnam Market. Later, she becomes Yeong-han's wife.

=== Supporting ===
==== Jongnam Police Station Investigation Unit 1 ====
- Choi Deok-moon as Yu Dae-cheon

Leader of Jongnam Police Station Investigation Unit 1, and Yeong-han's mentor who is a veteran police officer with a sense of duty.

==== Jongnam Police Station Investigation Unit 2 ====
- Song Wook-kyung as Byun Dae-sik

Leader of Jongnam Police Station Investigation Unit 2.

- Ryu Yeon-seok as Song Jae-deok

A detective of Jongnam Police Station Investigation Unit 2.

- Jo Han-jun as Hwang Soo-man

A detective of Jongnam Police Station Investigation Unit 2.

- Nam Hyun-woo as Oh Ji-sub

The youngest detective of Jongnam Police Station Investigation Unit 2.

==== National Forensic Service ====
- Go Sang-ho as Moon Guk-cheol

A talented autopsy doctor with a strong sense of duty, and a passion for learning.

==== Jongnam Seorim ====
- Chung Su-bin as Bong Nan-sil

A student at Jongnam Girls' High School who dreams of becoming a police officer in the future.

==== Jongnam Market ====
- Uhm Jun-gi as Seong-chil

Hal-mae's grandson.

- Cha Mi-kyung as Grandma Ho

An owner of a tteokbokki shop at Jeongnam Market.

- Kim Seo-an as Geum-ok

A daughter of a vegetable store at Jongnam Market.

==== Dongdaemun gang ====
- Kim Young-sung as Lee Jung-jae

Boss of the Dongdaemun gang, an infamous Korean Mafia syndicate in the 1950s, and a member of the Liberal Party.

- Kang In-kwon as Sal Mo-sa

Self-proclaimed second-in-command of the Dongdaemun gang. He is called Viper of Youngmoon Mountain.

- Park Jung-hyuk as Bang Wool-baem

Mo-sa's right-hand man, who is a grumpy and frivolous thug obsessed with pseudo-religion.

==== Boarding House ====
- Joo In-young as Mrs. Paju

A boarding house owner who is talkative and good at cooking.

- Shin Min-jae as Geum Eun-dong

A young man from the boarding house that wears horn-rimmed glasses. He is a banker who is timid, but has a strong work ethic.

- Lee Suk-hyeong as Jung Guk-jin

A young man from the boarding house who dreams of becoming a prosecutor.

=== Others ===
- Do Woo as Nam Sung-hoon

A mounted police officer, and the youngest member of the Jongnam Police Station.

- Kim Min-jae as Baek Do-seok

The new chief of the Jongnam Police Station.

- Moon Jin-seung as Detective Kang

Do-seok's right-hand man.

- Yoon Woo as Kim Soon-kyung

A man who tries to keep his principles.

=== Special appearances ===
- Choi Go as Kim Young-nam
- Choi Bool-am as present day Park Yeong-han
- Kim Soo-jin as Audrey Ko

A hysterical and vicious orphanage director.

- Ko Seo-hee as Jang Mal-sun

A woman who commits evil deeds under the pretext of selling American cosmetics products.

== Original soundtrack ==
=== Part 1 ===
Released on April 19, 2024
No.	Title	Lyrics	Music	Artist	Length
1.	"100 Wins" (지피지기 백전백승)	B.B; Dasol	B.B; Dasol; Tan (Solsire)	Seo Eun-kwang (BtoB)	3:25
2.	"100 Wins" (지피지기 백전백승; Inst.)		B.B; Dasol; Tan (Solsire)		3:25
Total length:					7:50

== Viewership ==
Chief Detective 1958 : South Korea viewers per episode (millions)

Season	Episode number										Average
Season	1	2	3	4	5	6	7	8	9	10	Average
1	1.861	1.513	1.821	1.359	1.729	1.615	1.684	1.831	1.795	2.015	1.722

Source: Audience measurement performed nationwide by Nielsen Korea.

Average TV viewership ratings
Ep.	Original broadcast date	Average audience share (Nielsen Korea)	
Ep.	Original broadcast date	Nationwide	Seoul
1	April 19, 2024	10.1% (1st)	10.3% (1st)
2	April 20, 2024	7.8% (2nd)	8.1% (2nd)
3	April 26, 2024	10.8% (1st)	10.6% (1st)
4	April 27, 2024	7.1% (2nd)	7.0% (2nd)
5	May 3, 2024	9.5% (2nd)	9.1% (1st)
6	May 4, 2024	9.0% (2nd)	9.2% (2nd)
7	May 10, 2024	9.9% (2nd)	9.8% (1st)
8	May 11, 2024	9.7% (2nd)	10.1% (2nd)
9	May 17, 2024	10.0% (2nd)	9.3% (1st)
10	May 18, 2024	10.6% (2nd)	10.6% (2nd)
Average		9.5%	9.4%
In the table above, the blue numbers represent the lowest ratings and the red numbers represent the highest ratings.
