= Blue Dragon Film Award for Best Editing =

South Korean film awards

- Awarded for: Best Editing
- Country: South Korea
- Presented by: Blue Dragon Film Awards
- First award: 1963
- Winner: Nam Na-yeong for Hi-Five
- Website: www.blueaward.co.kr

The Blue Dragon Film Award for Best Editing is one of the awards that is presented annually at the Blue Dragon Film Awards by Sports Chosun, which is typically held at the end of the year.

== Winners and nominees ==
Table key
‡	Indicates the winner

Year	Winners and nominees	Film	Original title
2014 (35th)	Kim Chang-ju ‡	A Hard Day	끝까지 간다
2014 (35th)	Choi Hyun-sook	Han Gong-ju	한공주
2014 (35th)	Kim Sang-bum, Kim Jae-bum	The Attorney	변호인
2014 (35th)	Nam Na-yeong	Tazza: The Hidden Card	타짜: 신의 손
2014 (35th)	Shin Min-kyung	The Divine Move	신의 한 수
2015 (36th)	Yang Jin-mo ‡	The Beauty Inside	뷰티 인사이드
2015 (36th)	Kim Sang-bum, Kim Jae-bum	The Throne	사도
2015 (36th)	Kim Sang-bum, Kim Jae-bum	Veteran	베테랑
2015 (36th)	Lee Jin	Ode to My Father	국제시장
2015 (36th)	Shin Min-kyung	Assassination	암살
2016 (37th)	Kim Sun-min ‡	The Wailing	곡성
2016 (37th)	Kim Chang-joo	The Tunnel	터널
2016 (37th)	Kim Sang-bum	Inside Men	내부자들
2016 (37th)	Shin Min-kyung	The Priests	검은 사제들
2016 (37th)	Yang Jin-mo	Train to Busan	부산행
2017 (38th)	Shin Min-kyung ‡	The King	더 킹
2017 (38th)	Kim Sang-bum, Kim Jae-bum	The Merciless	불한당: 나쁜 놈들의 세상
2017 (38th)	Kim Seon-min	The Outlaws	범죄도시
2017 (38th)	Lee Jin	Confidential Assignment	공조
2017 (38th)	Yoon Seok-min	Criminal Conspiracy	공범자들
2018 (39th)	Kim Hyung-joo, Yang Dong-yeop, Jeong Beom-sik ‡	Gonjiam: Haunted Asylum	곤지암
2018 (39th)	Kim Jin-oh, Kim Hye-jin	Along with the Gods: The Two Worlds	신과함께: 죄와 벌
2018 (39th)	Kim Sang-bum, Kim Jae-bum	The Spy Gone North	공작
2018 (39th)	Kim Seon-min	Little Forest	리틀 포레스트
2018 (39th)	Yang Jin-mo	1987: When the Day Comes	1987
2019 (40th)	Nam Na-yeong ‡	Swing Kids	스윙키즈
2019 (40th)	Nam Na-yeong	Extreme Job	극한직업
2019 (40th)	Yang Jin-mo	Parasite	기생충
2019 (40th)	Yang Jin-mo	The Battle: Roar to Victory	봉오동 전투
2019 (40th)	Lee Gang-hui	Exit	엑시트
2020 (41st)	Han Mi-yeon‡	Beasts Clawing at Straws	지푸라기라도 잡고 싶은 짐승들
2020 (41st)	Jeong Ji-eun	The Man Standing Next	남산의 부장들
2020 (41st)	Kim Hyung-joo	Deliver Us from Evil	다만 악에서 구하소서
2020 (41st)	Park Se-young	Moonlit Winter	윤희에게
2020 (41st)	Shin Min-kyung	Kim Ji-young: Born 1982	82년생 김지영
2021 (42nd)
2021 (42nd)	Kim Jeong-hun‡	The Book of Fish	자산어보
2021 (42nd)	Lee Gang-hui	Escape from Mogadishu	모가디슈
2021 (42nd)	Kim Tae-seong	Hard Hit	발신제한
2021 (42nd)	Nam Na-young	Space Sweepers	승리호
2021 (42nd)	Kim Chang-ju	Hostage: Missing Celebrity	인질
2022 (43rd)	Kim Sang-bum‡	Hunt	헌트
2022 (43rd)	Kim Sang-bum	Decision to Leave	헤어질 결심
2022 (43rd)	Lee Kang-hee, Ahn Hyun-gun	Hansan: Rising Dragon	한산: 용의 출현
2022 (43rd)	Kim Sang-bum	Kingmaker	킹메이커
2022 (43rd)	Kim Seon-min	The Roundup	범죄도시2
2023 (44th)	Kim Sun-min ‡	The Night Owl	올빼미
2023 (44th)	Han Mi-yeon	Sleep	잠
2023 (44th)	Han Mi-yeon	Concrete Utopia	콘크리트 유토피아
2023 (44th)	Yang Jin-mo	Cobweb	거미집
2023 (44th)	Lee Gang-hee	Smugglers	밀수
2024 (45th)	Kim Sang-bum ‡	12.12: The Day	서울의 봄
2024 (45th)	Bae Yeon-tae	I, the Executioner	베테랑2
2024 (45th)	Lee Gang-hee	Escape	탈주
2024 (45th)	Jeong Byung-jin	Exhuma	파묘
2024 (45th)	Kim Sun-min	Handsome Guys	핸섬가이즈
2025 (46th)	Nam Na-yeong ‡	Hi-Five	하이파이브
2025 (46th)	Kim Sang-bum	The Match	승부
2025 (46th)	Kim Sang-bum	No Other Choice	어쩔수가없다
2025 (46th)	Park Ju-ae	The Ugly	얼굴
2025 (46th)	Kim Man-geun	Harbin	하얼빈

== General references ==
- "Winners and nominees lists". Blue Dragon Film Awards (in Korean). Archived from the original on 27 January 2022.
- "Blue Dragon Film Awards". Naver (in Korean).
