= Navillera (TV series) =

2021 South Korean television series

- Promotional poster
- Also known as: Like a Butterfly
- Hangul: 나빌레라
- RR: Nabillera
- MR: Nabillera
- Genre: Drama
- Created by: Choe Gyeong-suk
- Based on: Navillera by Hun and Ji-min
- Written by: Lee Eun-mi
- Directed by: Han Dong-hwa
- Starring: Park In-hwan; Song Kang; Na Moon-hee; Hong Seung-hee
- Country of origin: South Korea
- Original language: Korean
- No. of episodes: 12

Production
- Executive producers: Oh Yeong-rim; Im Seung-jin
- Producers: Kim Yeong-gyu (Planning); Oh Hwan-min; Kang Bo-hyeon; Kim Geon-hong (CP); Kwon Byeong-uk; Kim Na-gyeong
- Cinematography: Jang Deok-Hwan; Park Yun-min
- Editor: Twin Peaks
- Camera setup: Single-camera
- Running time: 61–70 minutes
- Production companies: Studio Dragon; The Great Show

Original release
- Network: tvN
- Release: March 22 – April 27, 2021

Navillera (Korean: 나빌레라) is a 2021 South Korean television series starring Park In-hwan, Song Kang, Na Moon-hee, and Hong Seung-hee. Based on the Daum webtoon of the same name written by Hun and illustrated by Ji-min between 2016 and 2017, it aired on tvN from March 22 to April 27, 2021. It is also available for streaming on Netflix.

== Synopsis ==
Navillera tells the story of Shim Deok-chul (Park In-hwan), a 70-year-old retired mailman who decides to pursue his life-long dream of learning ballet, which does not impress his family. At the dance academy, he meets Lee Chae-rok (Song Kang), a 23-year-old dancer who became interested in ballet after trying out different sports. Chae-rok's mother was a ballet dancer before she died when he was young. He is struggling financially and thinks of giving up ballet until meeting Deok-chul, which changes his mind.

Sim Deok-chul's commitment to his dream inspires people with different genders, ages, and social status trying to achieve their dreams and do what makes them happy. The South China Morning Post states in their review of the series that "Navillera deals with relatable issues of old age, whether you're the one approaching it or your loved ones".

== Characters ==
=== Main ===
- Park In-hwan as Shim Deok-chul

Deok-chul is a retired mailman who has just celebrated his 70th birthday. Seeing how his friends started to regret dreams they could not pursue in their younger age, he decided to try to fulfill his long-life dream of becoming a ballerino. He meets Lee Chae-rok after accidentally seeing him practicing for his upcoming ballet competition.

- Song Kang as Lee Chae-rok

Chae-rok is a 23-year-old ballerino who is struggling financially and tries to support himself by working as a part-timer at a café. His deceased mother was a ballerina, whilst his father Lee Moo-young was in jail. His passion for ballet has started to fade away as he is having a hard time in living. Everything started to change slowly after he meets Shim Deok-chul.

- Na Moon-hee as Choi Hae-nam

Hae-nam is Deok-chul's wife, who cares deeply for her family. Initially, Hae-nam disapproved of her husband's ballet dreams, but supports him after seeing how passionate he is.

- Hong Seung-hee as Shim Eun-ho, Deok-chul's granddaughter who is currently working as an intern at the same café as Chae-rok. She eventually becomes friends with him.

=== Supporting ===
- Jo Sung-ha as Lee Moo-young, Chae-rok's father who used to be a soccer coach at his school before going to jail. He was released recently and lives apart from his son to make a living.
- Kim Tae-hoon as Ki Seung-joo, Chae-rok's ballet teacher who owns Ballet Studio. He seems to be strict and short-tempered, but actually cares about his students very much.
- Shin Eun-jung as Kim Ae-ran, Eun-ho's mother and daughter-in-law of Deok-chul.
- Jung Hae-kyun as Shim Sung-san, Eun-ho's father and Deok-chul's first son. He aggressively opposes his father taking ballet lessons.
- Kim Soo-jin as Shim Sung-suk, Deok-chul's daughter and wife of struggling politician Young-il.
- Yoon Ji-hye as Eun So-ri, Seung-joo's ex-wife who is a ballet teacher at Hankuk University of Arts Dance School.
- Lee So-yeong as Anna Yoo, a pianist at Ballet Studio.
- Jung Hee-tae as Young-il, Sung-suk's husband who is a politician.
- Jo Bok-rae as Shim Sung-gwan, Deok-chul's second son who quit being a doctor and is struggling in pursuing his dream of becoming a film director.
- Kim Hyun-mok as Kim Se-jong, Chae-rok's friend since their school days, also his fellow part-timer at a café.
- Seo In-guk as Hwan-hee
- Kim Kwon as Yang Ho-beom, Chae-rok's former friend who now resents him after the latter's father beat him up, claiming that he does not deserve to live a good life.

== Original soundtrack ==
Part 1, released on March 30, 2021
No.	Title	Lyrics	Music	Artist	Length
1.	"My Day"	Kim Min	Kim Min; Taylor	Taemin	3:06
2.	"My Day" (Inst.)		Kim Min; Taylor		3:06
Total length:					6:12

Part 2, released on April 6, 2021
No.	Title	Lyrics	Music	Artist	Length
1.	"Butterfly"	Kim Min	8hoop; Kim Min	Kim Kook-heon	3:06
2.	"Butterfly" (Inst.)		8hoop; Kim Min		3:06
Total length:					6:12

Part 3, released on April 13, 2021
No.	Title	Lyrics	Music	Artist	Length
1.	"Beautiful Words" (아름다운 말)	Jang Young Soo; Glody	Jang Young Soo; Glody	Sohyang	4:08
2.	"Beautiful Words" (Inst.)		Jang Young Soo; Glody		4:08
Total length:					8:16

Part 4, released on April 20, 2021
No.	Title	Lyrics	Music	Artist	Length
1.	"Heal You"	Kim Sun-min; Hwang Yoon-jin	Kim Min; 8hoop	Ha Hyun-sang	3:30
2.	"Heal You" (Inst.)		Kim Min; 8hoop		3:30
Total length:					7:00

Navillera (Original Television Soundtrack)

Compilation album by Various Artist
- Released: April 27, 2021
- Genre: Soundtrack
- Length: 54:34
- Languages: Korean; English
- Label: Stone Music Entertainment

Singles from Navillera
- 1. "My Day" Released: March 30, 2021; 2. "Butterfly" Released: April 6, 2021; 3. "Beautiful Words" Released: April 13, 2021; 4. "Heal You" Released: April 20, 2021

Compilation album, released on April 27, 2021
No.	Title	Artist	Length
1.	"My Day"	Taemin	3:06
2.	"Butterfly"	Kim Kook-heon	3:06
3.	"Beautiful Words" (아름다운 말)	Sohyang	4:08
4.	"Heal You"	Ha Hyun-sang	3:30
5.	"A Dream of Deok-chul"	Shin Min-yong	2:22
6.	"A Scent of Dream"	Byun Dong-wook	3:14
7.	"Dreams Come True"	Shin Min-yong	2:53
8.	"The Sea On My Mind"	Lim Ha-young	5:32
9.	"The Day When The Snow Falls Gently"	Jin Myeong-yong	3:35
10.	"A Journey To Myself"	Byun Dong-wook	2:22
11.	"Navilleromance"	Yoo Jong-hyun	2:24
12.	"Soaring"	Lim Seung-beom, Ciel	4:02
13.	"With You"	Shin Min-yong	2:41
14.	"Gestures For One Person"	Lim Ha-young	1:10
15.	"Finding Me"	Lim Ha-young	1:55
16.	"Prayer"	Jung Heon	2:30
17.	"A Dream of Chae-rok"	Jin Myeong-yong	3:50
18.	"Gifts"	Yoo Jong-hyun	2:05
Total length:			54:34

== Viewership ==
Navillera : South Korea viewers per episode (thousands)

Season	Episode number												Average
Season	1	2	3	4	5	6	7	8	9	10	11	12	Average
1	656	655	687	745	632	653	651	537	694	636	661	819	669

Source: Audience measurement performed nationwide by Nielsen Korea

Average TV viewership ratings
Ep.	Original broadcast date	Average audience share (Nielsen Korea)	
Ep.	Original broadcast date	Nationwide	Seoul
1	March 22, 2021	2.810% (2nd)	2.921% (2nd)
2	March 23, 2021	2.964% (1st)	3.037% (1st)
3	March 29, 2021	3.325% (1st)	3.175% (1st)
4	March 30, 2021	3.623% (1st)	3.692% (1st)
5	April 5, 2021	2.764% (1st)	2.617% (1st)
6	April 6, 2021	2.759% (1st)	2.800% (2nd)
7	April 12, 2021	2.783% (1st)	2.616% (1st)
8	April 13, 2021	2.464% (1st)	2.434% (1st)
9	April 19, 2021	3.150% (1st)	2.980% (1st)
10	April 20, 2021	2.859% (1st)	2.826% (1st)
11	April 26, 2021	2.992% (1st)	3.046% (1st)
12	April 27, 2021	3.679% (1st)	4.013% (1st)
Average		3.014%	3.013%
In the table above, the blue numbers represent the lowest ratings and the red numbers represent the highest ratings.; This drama airs on a cable channel/pay TV which normally has a relatively smaller audience compared to free-to-air TV/public broadcasters (KBS, SBS, MBC and EBS).
