= Hi-Five (film) =

2025 film by Kang Hyeong-cheol

- Theatrical release poster
- Hangul: 하이파이브
- Lit.: High Five
- RR: Hai paibeu
- MR: Hai p'aibŭ
- Directed by: Kang Hyeong-cheol
- Written by: Kang Hyeong-cheol
- Produced by: Lee An-na
- Starring: Lee Jae-in; Ahn Jae-hong; Ra Mi-ran; Kim Hee-won; Yoo Ah-in; Oh Jung-se; Park Jin-young
- Cinematography: Choi Chan-min
- Edited by: Nam Na-yeong
- Music by: Kim Joon-seok
- Production company: Annapurna Films
- Distributed by: Next Entertainment World
- Release date: May 30, 2025
- Running time: 120 minutes
- Country: South Korea
- Language: Korean
- Budget: US$11 million
- Box office: US$14.1 million

Hi-Five (Note: also known as Hi.5) (Korean: 하이파이브) is a 2025 South Korean fantasy action comedy film written and directed by Kang Hyeong-cheol. It stars Lee Jae-in, Ahn Jae-hong, Ra Mi-ran, Kim Hee-won, Yoo Ah-in, Oh Jung-se, and Park Jin-young. The film was released theatrically on May 30, 2025.

== Plot ==
An unidentified man is rushed to the hospital and undergoes organ donation, with doctors Go and Oh performing the surgery. After removing the viable organs, they complain about the procedure being unusually difficult due to the corpse's tough skin. Suddenly, a female doctor screams about a ghost, and when the two doctors rush back, they find the body turning to ashes. A flashback reveals the identity and past of the mysterious donor.

The donor's heart goes to a girl named Park Wan-seo, whose father Jong-min is a former Olympic medalist and now a taekwondo instructor. He is overprotective due to past trauma and restricts her physical activity. However, Wan-seo begins to discover superhuman abilities, kicking a sandbag into the ceiling and running at lightning speed. She meets a nerdy young man, Park Ji-sung, who also has a superpower, an absurdly strong lung capacity. He urges her to find others like them. This leads them to a gathering of organ transplant recipients.

At the gathering, Wan-seo's team wins the competition thanks to her powers. There, they meet Kim Seon-nyeo, a quirky yogurt seller who turns out to have a hidden tattoo linking her to the others. The group, now growing, includes Hwang Gi-dong, who gained electromagnetic vision via a cornea transplant and can control devices by snapping his fingers. Tensions rise between Ji-sung and Gi-dong, but the team starts to bond, even giving themselves hero names.

Meanwhile, Yeong-chun, the elderly leader of a new religious movement is revived by mysterious means, possibly linked to an organ transplant. His daughter Chun-hwa grows suspicious as she uncovers a web of surgeries, supernatural powers, and a plan to harvest more organs. Laborers at a construction site suffer an accident, but team member Huh Yak-seon, who has healing powers, helps save lives at great personal cost.

As Chun-hwa begins kidnapping organ recipients to get ahead of her father's plans, the team, now fractured due to infighting, must reunite. Wan-seo convinces her father to help rescue her friends, and together they stop several kidnappings. However, Gi-dong is partially operated on by Yeong-chun, who now possesses multiple abilities. Yak-seon, despite his weakened state, helps rescue Gi-dong.

A now-youthful Yeong-chun emerges as a messianic figure during the revival meeting. Though initially met with skepticism, he uses his powers to perform "miracles", gaining fanatical followers. Meanwhile, Wan-seo and her father infiltrate his hideout and confront him. During the clash, Wan-seo finally unleashes her power in front of her father, defeating Yeong-chun.

== Cast ==
- Lee Jae-in as Park Wan-seo
  - Ok Hye-rin as young Park Wan-seo

A Taekwondo-loving girl who is innocent and courageous. After a long illness, she miraculously received a heart transplant. After that, she found that she had acquired explosive power and lightning-like superpowers.

- Ahn Jae-hong as Park Ji-sung
  - Cho Jae-young as young Park Ji-sung

A screenwriter who has failed to debut for many years. After receiving a lung transplant, he has gained a strong lung capacity that can blow everything in front of him.

- Ra Mi-ran as Kim Seon-nyeo
  - Oh Seung-ha as young Kim Seon-nyeo

A diligent "fresh delivery manager" who rides a yogurt car and appears anytime and anywhere. After receiving a kidney transplant, she regained her physical and mental health and treated the people around her with a warmer and kinder attitude. It is eventually revealed her power is to transfer the powers of the other recipients.

- Kim Hee-won as Huh Yak-seon
  - Jeong Jun as young Huh Yak-seon

A stubborn and picky factory manager who often nags and toss the employees on the construction site exhausted. After receiving a liver transplant, his hands have the ability to heal other people's wounds.

- Yoo Ah-in as Hwang Gi-dong
  - Choi Woo-rok as young Hwang Gi-dong

An unemployed man who after receiving a corneal transplant, has gained the ability to control electromagnetic waves. He can change the light and listen to music with just a flick of his fingers.

- Oh Jung-se as Park Jong-min

Wan-seo's father, the director of the taekwondo hall, and a former member of the national taekwondo team.

- Park Jin-young as Seo Yeong-chun
  - Shin Goo as older Yeong-chun

The cult leader of Saeshin church, who after receiving pancreas transplant, gained the superpower to absorb the youth of others.

- Jin Hee-kyung as Seo Chun-hwa

Young-chun's daughter.

- Jang Gwang as Hwang Byeong-chun

A long-time colleague of Yeong-chun and rival vying for the position of cult leader of the Saeshin church.

- Park Hyung-soo as Cho Sang-man
- Yoo Seung-mok as Song Ho-rim

Chief of Medical Clinic.

- Ahn Seung-gyun as Lee Seung-hun

A worker at Saeshin Foundation.

- Kim Won-hae as Doctor Oh

An organ transplant surgeon.

- Lee Dong-hwi as Doctor Go

An organ transplant surgeon.

- Hyun Bong-sik as a cardiologist

== Production ==
=== Casting ===
In March 2021, it was announced that Yoo Ah-in, Ra Mi-ran, Ahn Jae-hong, Oh Jung-se and Lee Jae-in joined the cast of the film, followed by Jinyoung in May 2021.

=== Filming ===
Principal photography began on June 1, 2021. Filming took place in Songdo International Business District, Incheon and Namhyeon-dong, Seoul, and ended on November 7, 2021.

== Release ==
The first tentative date of release for Hi-Five was 2022. It was later scheduled for a May 2023 release, but it was postponed indefinitely after Yoo Ah-in tested positive for propofol and marijuana in February 2023. Later in June 2023, Next Entertainment World reported that internal discussions were underway on how to edit out Yoo and that releasing the movie within the year would be difficult.

On April 4, 2025, Next Entertainment World announced that they were preparing for the movie to be released in June and that Yoo Ah-in would not participate in promotional schedule. Originally set to be released on June 3, Hi-Five hit cinemas in South Korea on May 30.

Hi-Five was released in Cambodia on June 6; Singapore, Malaysia, Thailand, and Brunei on June 12; Indonesia, Vietnam, Taiwan, and East Timor on June 13; Hong Kong and Macau on June 19; and in the U.S. and Canada on June 20.

== Reception ==
=== Box office ===
The film opened in South Korea with over 70,000 admissions on its first day, surpassing Mission: Impossible – Dead Reckoning, which had held the top spot for 13 consecutive days, to become the daily box office leader. It maintained its daily box office lead for ten consecutive days after release, and topped the weekend box office in its opening weekend with over 380,000 viewers. In its second weekend, it ranked second at the box office with 400,700 admissions, bringing the cumulative number of viewers to 1.15 million.

=== Accolades ===
Award ceremony	Year	Category	Recipient(s)	Result	Ref.
Bechdel Day	2025	Bechdel Choice 10 — Film	High-Five	Won	
Bechdel Day	2025	Bechdelian in film — Producer of the Year	Lee An-na	Won	
Blue Dragon Film Awards	2025	Best Actress	Lee Jae-in	Nominated	
Blue Dragon Film Awards	2025	Best New Actor	Park Jin-young	Nominated	
Blue Dragon Film Awards	2025	Best Screenplay	Kang Hyeong-cheol	Nominated	
Blue Dragon Film Awards	2025	Best Editing	Nam Na-yeong	Won	
Blue Dragon Film Awards	2025	Best Cinematography and Lighting	Choi Chan-min, Yoo Seok-moon	Nominated	
Blue Dragon Film Awards	2025	Best Music	Kim Joon-seok	Nominated	
Buil Film Awards	2025	Best Actor	Ahn Jae-hong	Nominated	
Buil Film Awards	2025	Best Music	Kim Joon-seok	Won	
Director's Cut Awards	2026	Best New Actress (Film)	Lee Jae-in	Nominated	
Fantasia International Film Festival	2025	Audience Award: Best Asian Feature	Hi-Five	Silver	
Jecheon International Music & Film Festival	2026	Music Insight Grand Prize	Kim Joon-seok	Won	
