= My Paparotti =

- Hangul: 파파로티
- RR: Paparoti
- MR: P'ap'arot'i
- Directed by: Yoon Jong-chan
- Written by: Yoo Young-a
- Produced by: Park Mu-seung; Bang Chu-sung; Ryu Eun-suk; Yoon Hye-ra; Lee Seok-won; Jo Jeong-hwa; Kwon Yoo-kyeong
- Starring: Han Suk-kyu; Lee Je-hoon; Oh Dal-su; Cho Jin-woong; Kang So-ra
- Cinematography: Lee Chang-jae
- Edited by: Steve M. Choe
- Music by: Lee Jae-hak; Lee Sang-hun
- Distributed by: Showbox/Mediaplex
- Release date: March 14, 2013
- Running time: 127 minutes
- Country: South Korea
- Language: Korean
- Box office: US$10.5 million

My Paparotti (Korean: 파파로티; RR: Paparoti) is a 2013 South Korean biographical comedy-drama film starring Han Suk-kyu, Lee Je-hoon, Oh Dal-su, Cho Jin-woong and Kang So-ra It focuses on the special relationship between a high school gangster and the music teacher who helps him pursue his dream of becoming a singer like the late tenor Luciano Pavarotti.

Allegedly based on the real-life story of Kim Ho-joong, who first appeared on the variety show Star King in July 2009, where he talked about growing up as a thug and joining gangs, until his grandmother encouraged him to pursue singing; and in 2020 became one of the seven finalists of the trot audition program Mr. Trot.

== Plot ==
Sang-jin, a formerly promising vocalist, now works as a high school music teacher after suffering from a vocal cord tumor. His ordinary life becomes full of drama when Jang-ho, a local teenage gangster, is transferred to Sang-jin's school. Jang-ho is a thorn in Sang-jin's side, but upon hearing Jang-ho sing, he is deeply impressed with his natural talent and decides to commit to his training. As the 2 develop their special bond, an unexpected conflict arises between the two gangs in town which forces Jang-ho into a critical situation. Will Jang-ho overcome the obstacles and fulfill his destiny as a world-class vocalist?

== Cast ==
- Han Suk-kyu - Sang-jin
- Lee Je-hoon - Jang-ho
- Oh Dal-su - Principal Deok-saeng
- Cho Jin-woong - Chang-soo
- Kang So-ra - Sook-hee
- Lee Sang-hoon - dean of students
- Lee Do-yeon - English teacher
- Lee Jae-yong - gang boss
- Jin Kyung - Mi-sun, Sang-jin's wife
- Yang Han-yeol as Sang-jin's son
- Bae Sung-woo - Sang-jin's alumnus
- Kim Yong-hoon - Jang-ho's subordinate
- Kim Ji-seok - drunken man (cameo)

== Awards and nominations ==
Year	Award	Category	Recipient	Result	Ref.
2013	27th Fukuoka Asian Film Festival	Grand Prize	My Paparotti	Won	
2014	10th Jecheon International Music & Film Festival	Best Actor in a Music Film	Lee Je-hoon	Won	
