= Lee Je-hoon =

South Korean actor (born 1984)

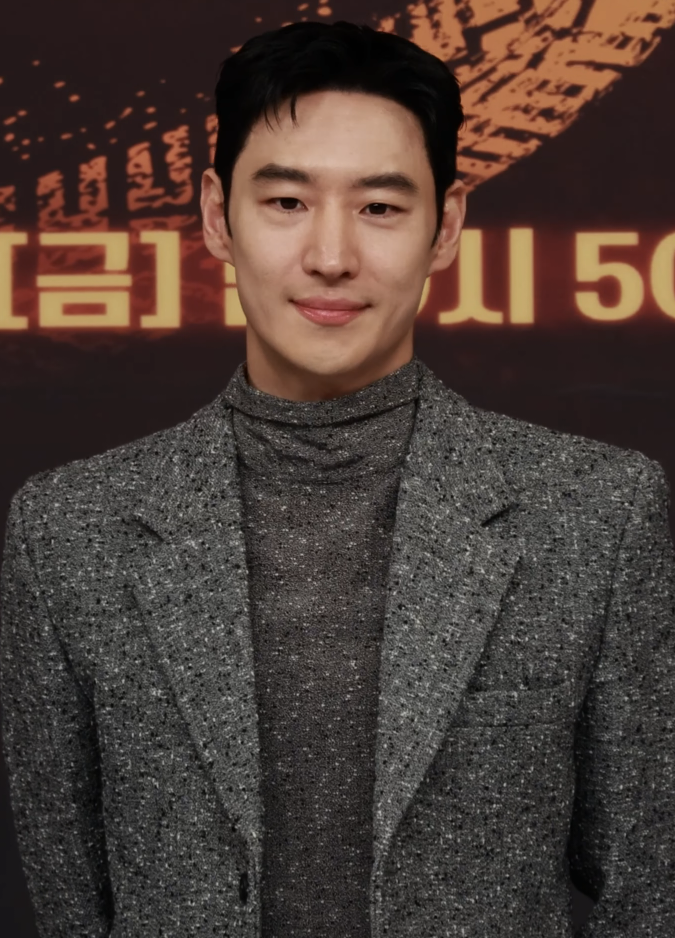
- Lee in 2025
- Born: July 4, 1984 (age 42); Jongno District, Seoul, South Korea
- Education: Korea National University of Arts – School of Drama
- Occupations: Actor; director; screenwriter
- Years active: 2007–present
- Agent: Company On

Korean name
- Hangul: 이제훈
- RR: I Jehun
- MR: I Chehun

Lee Je-hoon (Korean: 이제훈; born July 4, 1984) is a South Korean comedian and actor. Having found success in both film and television, Lee first gained recognition for his roles in the films Bleak Night (2011) and The Front Line (2011), receiving numerous awards for his performances. Notably, his role as Ki-tae in Bleak Night earned him Best New Actor at the Blue Dragon Film Awards and the Grand Bell Awards.

Lee gained mainstream popularity with the box-office hit Architecture 101 (2012) and found success in television with the critically and commercially successful Signal (2016). He would go on to achieve further acclaim with the action crime series Taxi Driver (2021–2026). His other notable works include films Anarchist from Colony (2017), I Can Speak (2017), and Escape (2024), as well as television series Move to Heaven (2021) and Chief Detective 1958 (2024).

== Career ==
=== 2006–2010: Beginnings ===
When Lee Je-hoon realized that he wanted to go into acting, he dropped out of Biotechnology major at Korea University and transferred to the School of Drama at Korea National University of Arts. From 2006 to 2010, Lee appeared in more than 18 student shorts and indie films, notably the queer coming-of-age romance Just Friends?. He also appeared as an extra in a number of commercial films like erotic thriller The Servant and romantic comedy Finding Mr. Destiny.

=== 2011–2012: Breakthrough ===
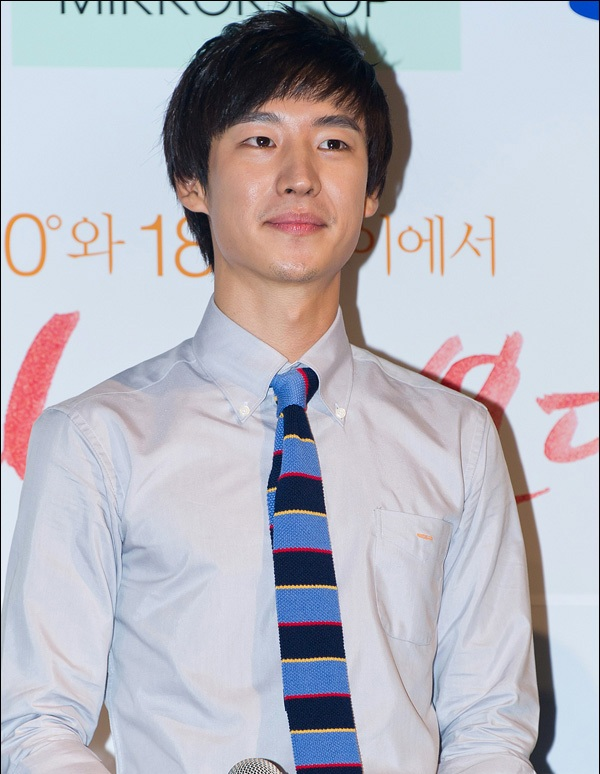
Lee in 2011

Lee had his breakthrough in 2011. He received rave reviews for his performances as a manipulative alpha-male in the haunting indie film Bleak Night, and as a morphine-addicted squad leader in big-budget war film The Front Line. He gained mainstream popularity as a shy college student pining for his first love in the box-office hit Architecture 101, and though the television series Fashion King was poorly received, his role as a struggling young chaebol heir in Korea's fashion industry further showcased his versatility.

Lee starred opposite acclaimed veteran actor Han Suk-kyu in the comedy-drama My Paparotti, which focuses on the special relationship between a high school gang member who dreams of becoming a singer like the late tenor Luciano Pavarotti, and the music teacher who helps him pursue his dream. He then starred in Ghost Sweepers, dubbed the character Jack Frost for the Korean release of 3D animated film Rise of the Guardians, and featured in the crime thriller An Ethics Lesson.

=== 2012–2023: Enlistment and return to acting ===
For his comeback project after enlistment, Lee chose Secret Door, a period drama about Crown Prince Sado who was controversially executed through death by starvation by his father King Yeongjo; the series reunited him with Han Suk-kyu. This was followed by the Jo Sung-hee-directed film Phantom Detective, a modern retelling of the eponymous folk hero Hong Gil-dong as a private detective in the 1990s.

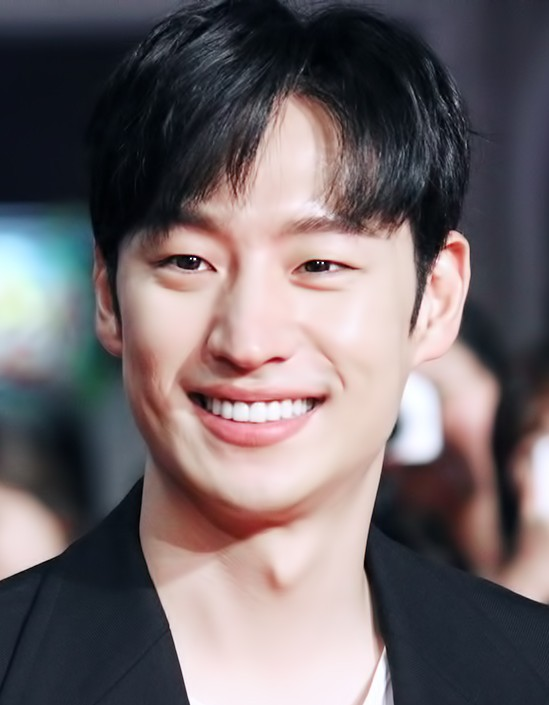
Lee in 2016

In 2016, Lee starred in tvN's fantasy crime drama Signal together with Cho Jin-woong and Kim Hye-soo, which was critically and commercially successful.

In 2017, Lee starred in the fantasy romance drama Tomorrow, With You opposite Shin Min-a, portraying a CEO of a real estate company who has the ability to travel through time. He then starred in the biographical period drama film Anarchist from Colony directed by Lee Joon-ik, playing the character of Park Yeol, a self-proclaimed anarchist and revolutionary activist during the Colonial Era of Japan. The same year Lee starred in the film I Can Speak as a civil servant who also tutors English.

In 2018, Lee starred in the airport-themed melodrama Where Stars Land alongside Chae Soo-bin. Lee and co-star Chae Soo-bin were appointed as honorary ambassadors of Incheon International Airport.

In 2019, Lee filmed the travel reality programme Traveller along with Ryu Jun-yeol where the two stars enjoy a backpacking holiday in Cuba. The same year, he was cast in the film Tomb Robbery.

In 2020, Lee starred in the dystopian action thriller film Time to Hunt which earned him a nomination for Best Actor at the 56th Baeksang Arts Awards. He also starred in the caper story film Collectors.

In 2021, Lee joined the SBS drama Taxi Driver, his small screen comeback after making a special appearance in Hot Stove League last 2020. Later in May, Lee appeared in the Netflix series Move to Heaven. Lee founded "Company on" in June 2021, after the contract with his former agency expired.

In October, he made a special appearance in the SBS drama One Dollar Lawyer.

In 2023, Lee starred in the second season of SBS drama Taxi Driver. He expressed interest in starring in a Filipino drama or film: "If there are good projects here in the Philippines, I am willing to join the project and I will take the opportunity".

=== 2024–present ===
In 2024, Lee starred in the film Escape as Lim Gyu-nam, and received a Best Actor nomination at the 45th Blue Dragon Film Awards. That year he also starred in the MBC drama Chief Detective 1958, and won the Top Excellence Award, Actor in a Miniseries at the 2024 MBC Drama Awards. He co-hosted the Blue Dragon Film Awards with Han Ji-min in 2024 and 2025.

In 2025, Lee returned for the third season of Taxi Driver, which earned him the Grand Prize (Daesang) at the 2025 SBS Drama Awards. In February 2026, he was confirmed to star in the drama The Long Shot Trial, scheduled for 2027.

In 2026, Lee is set to reprise his role in the tvN drama The Second Signal, the second season of Signal, which is scheduled to premiere on December 7, 2026.

== Personal life ==
Lee enlisted on October 25, 2012, for his mandatory military service as a member of the Seoul Metropolitan Police Agency riot police. He was discharged on July 24, 2014.

== Philanthropy ==
In May 2015, Lee visited the Philippines to meet with the typhoon victims and helped in reconstruction of a mangrove project in Cebu.

On March 6, 2022, Lee donated 100 million won to the Hope Bridge Disaster Relief Association to help the victims of the massive wildfire that started in Uljin, Gyeongbuk and has spread to Samcheok, Gangwon.

In April 2023, Lee donated a total of 1 million won from the quiz on You Quiz on the Block to the Korea Film Academy (KAFA) Development Fund.

== Filmography ==
Key
†	Denotes films that have not yet been released

=== Film ===
Feature film

Year	Title	Role	Notes	Ref.
2009	The Pit and the Pendulum	Young Sang-tae		
2010	The Influence	Sunjong	Internet film	
2010	The Servant	Hanbok maker	Bit part	
2010	Finding Mr. Destiny	Woo-hyung	Bit part	
2010	Ghost	Kim Se-young	Segment: "Tarot 3. The Unseen"	
2011	Bleak Night	Ki-tae	Independent film	
2011	The Front Line	Captain Shin Il-young		
2012	Architecture 101	young Lee Seung-min		
2012	Ghost Sweepers	Suk-hyun		
2012	Rise of the Guardians	Jack Frost (voice)	Korean dub	
2013	An Ethics Lesson	Kim Jung-hoon		
2013	My Paparotti	Lee Jang-ho		
2016	Phantom Detective	Hong Gil-dong		
2017	Anarchist from Colony	Park Yeol		
2017	I Can Speak	Park Min-jae		
2020	Time to Hunt	Joon-seok		
2020	Collectors	Kang Dong-goo		
2023	Noryang: Deadly Sea	young Gwang-hae	Special appearance	
2024	Escape	Lim Gyu-nam		
2025	Big Deal	Choi In-beom		

Short film

Year	Title	Role
2007	They Live by Night	Private Shin
2007	Placebo	
2008	Ah Man	
2008	Holy Vacation	Kang Young-woon
2009	Just Friends?	Seok-i
2009	Language Life	Kyung-min
2009	When Winter Comes	
2010	Maldives Express	Eun-seok
2010	A Dog Came Into My Flash	Son / Man in his 20s
2010	Miss Communication	Male book designer

Filmmaking credits

Year	Title	Director	Writer	Producer	Ref.
2013	After Being Late...Love	Assistant	No	No	
2021	Unframed – Blue happiness	Yes	Yes (Note: It is a collaboration with Watcha and directed and written by Lee Je-hoon, Park Jeong-min, Choi Hee-seo and Son Suk-ku)	No	

=== Television series ===
Year	Title	Role	Notes	Ref.
2010	Three Sisters	Kim Eun-gook		
2012	Fashion King	Jung Jae-hyuk		
2014	Secret Door	Yi Sun		
2016–present	Signal	Park Hae-young	Seasons 1–2	
2017	Tomorrow, with You	Yoo So-joon		
2018	Where Stars Land	Lee Soo-yeon		
2020	Hot Stove League	Lee Je-hoon	Cameo (Ep. 16)	
2021–2026	Taxi Driver	Kim Do-gi	Seasons 1–3	
2021	Move to Heaven	Jo Sang-goo		
2022	One Dollar Lawyer	Top Star Lee Je-hoon	Cameo (Ep. 6)	
2023	Big Bet 2	Jang-jun	Cameo (Ep. 8)	
2024	Chief Detective 1958	Park Young-han		
2025	The Art of Negotiation	Yoon Joo-no		
2027	The Long Shot Trial †	Kwon Baek		

=== Documentary ===
Year	Title	Role	Ref.
2018	Earth: One Amazing Day	Narrator	
2019	DMZ – Prologue	Narrator	
2022	Another Record: Lee Je-hoon	Himself	

=== Television show ===
Year	Title	Role	Notes	Ref.
2019	Traveler	Cast member	with Ryu Jun-yeol	
2019	1919–2019, Memories	Narrator	Episode: 7 of Ahn Jung-geun	
2021	SBS Special – Immortal Age	Narrator	Episode: Frozen Man	
2021	Your Wish List, Change the Future of the Earth!	Narrator	Episode: October 2050, a letter from the future	
2024–2025	Rented in Finland	Cast member	with Cha Eun-woo, Lee Dong-hwi, Kwak Dong-yeon	

=== Hosting ===
Year	Title	Notes	Ref.
2018	2018 SBS Drama Awards	with Shin Dong-yup and Shin Hye-sun	
2024	45th Blue Dragon Film Awards	with Han Ji-min	
2025	46th Blue Dragon Film Awards	with Han Ji-min	

=== Music video appearances ===
Year	Title	Artist	Ref.
2012	"I Choose To Love You"	Hyolyn	
2015	"Home"	Brown Eyed Soul	
2019	"With You"	Crush	
2020	"Reconnect"	Code Kunst, Simon Dominic, and Choi Jung-hoon of Jannabi	
2021	"Only"	LeeHi	
2021	"I'll Never Know You"	Urban Zakapa	

== Discography ==
Title	Year	Album
"Love Like This" (사랑은 이렇게)	2012	Fashion King OST
"The Person That Makes You Happy" (행복을 주는 사람) (Duet with Han Suk-kyu)	2013	My Paparotti OST

== Ambassadorship ==
- 2016 Honorary Ambassador of Korean Academy of Film Arts (KAFA) by Korean Film Council
- 2016 Honorary Ambassador of Korea National Police Agency's Human Rights
- 2016 Honorary Ambassador of Oxfam Korea
- 2017 Honorary Ambassador of Seoul Biennale of Architecture and Urbanism
- 2018 - now Honorary Ambassador of Incheon Airport Korea

== Accolades ==
=== Awards and nominations ===
Name of the award ceremony, year presented, category, nominee of the award, and the result of the nomination
Award ceremony	Year	Category	Nominee / Work	Result	Ref.
Amnesty International Awards	2017	Special Award	I Can Speak	Won	
APAN Star Awards	2022	Top Excellence Award, Actor in a Miniseries	Taxi Driver	Nominated	
APAN Star Awards	2023	Top Excellence Award, Actor in a Serial Drama	Taxi Driver 2	Nominated	
Asia Contents Awards	2021	Best Actor	Move to Heaven	Won	
Asian Academy Creative Awards	2021	Best Actor in Leading Role	Move to Heaven	Won	
Asian Film Awards	2012	Best Supporting Actor	The Front Line	Nominated	
Baeksang Arts Awards	2012	Best New Actor – Film	Architecture 101	Nominated	
Baeksang Arts Awards	2020	Best Actor – Film	Time to Hunt	Nominated	
Blue Dragon Film Awards	2011	Best New Actor	Bleak Night	Won	
Blue Dragon Film Awards	2024	Best Actor	Escape	Nominated	
Blue Dragon Series Awards	2022	Best Leading Actor	Move to Heaven	Nominated	
Bucheon International Fantastic Film Festival	2012	Fantasia Award	Architecture 101	Won	
Buil Film Awards	2011	Best Dressed	Lee Je-hoon	Won	
Buil Film Awards	2011	Best New Actor	The Front Line	Won	
Buil Film Awards	2017	Best Actor	Anarchist from Colony	Nominated	
Busan International Film Festival with Marie Claire Asia Star Awards	2017	Asia Star Award	Lee Je-hoon	Won	
Busan International Film Festival with Marie Claire Asia Star Awards	2023	Asia Star Award	Lee Je-hoon	Won	
CGV Arthouse Opening Ceremony	2014	Plaque for Rising Star in Independent Film	Bleak Night	Won	
Cine Icon: KT&G Actor / Actress Event	2016	Icon of the Year	Phantom Detective	Won	
Cine21 Film Awards	2011	Best New Actor	Bleak Night	Won	
Elle Style Awards	2024	Elle Man of the Year	Escape; Chief Detective 1958	Won	
Fundex Awards	2026	Best Actor of TV Drama	Taxi Driver 3	Pending	
Golden Cinema Film Festival	2018	Male Popularity Award chosen by the cinematographer	I Can Speak	Won	
Golden Cinema Film Festival	2024	Male Popularity Award chosen by the cinematographer	Escape	Won	
Grand Bell Awards	2011	Best New Actor	Bleak Night	Won	
Grand Bell Awards	2011	Best New Actor	The Front Line	Nominated	
Grand Bell Awards	2017	Best Actor	Anarchist from Colony	Nominated	
Jecheon International Music & Film Festival	2014	Best Actor in a Music Film	My Paparotti	Won	
KAFA 10th Anniversary Award	2016	Actor Special Merit Award	Bleak Night	Won	
Kino Lights Awards	2021	Actor of the Year (Domestic)	Taxi Driver and Move to Heaven	3rd place	
KOFRA Film Awards	2012	Best New Actor	Bleak Night	Won	
Korea Art Film Association Awards	2025	Friends Award	Lee Je-hoon	Won	
Korea Film Actors Association	2016	Popular Star Award	Phantom Detective	Won	
Korea Youth Film Festival	2017	Grand Prize	Anarchist from Colony	Won	
Korean Association of Film Critics Awards	2011	Best New Actor	The Front Line	Won	
Korean Culture and Entertainment Awards	2011	Best New Actor	Bleak Night	Won	
MBC Drama Awards	2024	Top Excellence Award, Actor in a Miniseries	Chief Detective 1958	Won	
MBC Drama Awards	2024	Best Couple Award	Lee Je-hoon with Lee Dong-hwi; Chief Detective 1958	Nominated	
MBC Drama Awards	2024	Grand Prize (Daesang) (Note: A Daesang (Korean: 대상), which translates to "Grand Prize", is the highest honor given out at South Korean award ceremonies.)	Chief Detective 1958	Nominated	
Mnet 20's Choice Awards	2012	20's Male Movie Star	Architecture 101	Won	
Resistance Film Festival in Korea	2018	Best Actor	Anarchist from Colony, I Can Speak	Won	
SBS Drama Awards	2014	Top 10 Star	Secret Door	Won	
SBS Drama Awards	2014	Top Excellence Award, Actor in a Serial Drama	Secret Door	Won	
SBS Drama Awards	2018	Top Excellence Award, Actor in a Monday-Tuesday Drama	Where Stars Land	Won	
SBS Drama Awards	2018	Best Couple Award	Lee Je-hoon with Chae Soo-bin; Where Stars Land	Nominated	
SBS Drama Awards	2021	Top Excellence Award, Actor in a Miniseries – Fantasy	Taxi Driver	Won	
SBS Drama Awards	2021	Grand Prize (Daesang)	Taxi Driver	Nominated	
SBS Drama Awards	2023	Grand Prize (Daesang) (Note: Co-won with Kim Tae-ri)	Taxi Driver 2	Won	
SBS Drama Awards	2023	Top Excellence Award, Actor in a Seasonal Drama	Taxi Driver 2	Nominated	
SBS Drama Awards	2025	Grand Prize (Daesang)	Taxi Driver 3	Won	
Seoul International Drama Awards	2021	Outstanding Korean Actor	Taxi Driver	Nominated	
tvN10 Awards	2016	PD's Choice Award, Drama	Signal	Won	
tvN10 Awards	2016	Best Actor	Signal	Nominated	

=== State honors ===
Name of country, year given, and name of honor
Country	Organization	Year	Honor Or Award	Ref.
South Korea	Korea Good Donor Awards (Note: The Korea Good Donor Awards, hosted by the Ministry of Public Administration and Security and hosted by the Korea Council of Charities, is an awards ceremony designed to spread the donation culture in everyday life, select organizations and individuals who have taken the lead in sharing in various fields, and recognize their contributions.)	2023	Minister of Public Administration and Security Commendation	
South Korea	Korean Popular Culture and Arts Awards (Note: Honors are given at the Korean Popular Culture and Arts Awards, arranged by the Korea Creative Content Agency and hosted by the Ministry of Culture, Sports and Tourism. They are awarded to those who have contributed to the arts and South Korea's pop culture.)	2021	Minister of Culture, Sports and Tourism Commendation	
South Korea	Korean Popular Culture and Arts Awards	2024	Prime Minister Commendation	
South Korea	National Tax Service (Note: Honors are given at the Taxpayers' Day ceremony.)	2019	Presidential Commendation	
South Korea	Newsis K-Expo Cultural Awards (Note: Established in 2019 and co-sponsored by Korea's Ministry of Culture, Sports and Tourism, Ministry of Foreign Affairs, Korea Creative Content Agency, Seoul Metropolitan Council and the Seoul Tourism Organization, it awards cultural icons, businesses, and individuals who have contributed greatly to Hallyu, the Korean wave.)	2023	Minister of Culture, Sports and Tourism Award	

=== Listicles ===
Name of publisher, year listed, name of listicle, and placement
Publisher	Year	Listicle	Placement	Ref.
Forbes	2025	Korea Power Celebrity 40	19th	
Korean Film Council	2021	Korean Actors 200 (Note: Introduces 200 actors that best represent the present and future of Korean cinema to the people in the film industry all over the world.)	Included	
