= 45th Blue Dragon Film Awards =

2024 edition of award ceremony

- Official poster
- Awarded for: Excellence in cinematic achievements
- Awarded by: Sports Chosun
- Announced on: October 30, 2024
- Presented on: November 29, 2024
- Site: KBS Hall, Yeouido, Seoul
- Hosted by: Han Ji-min; Lee Je-hoon
- Organized by: Sports Chosun (a sister brand of The Chosun Ilbo)
- Official website: www.blueaward.co.kr

Highlights
- Best Film: 12.12: The Day
- Popular Star Award: Koo Kyo-hwan; Jung Hae-in; Lim Ji-yeon; Tang Wei
- Best Director: Jang Jae-hyun; Exhuma
- Best Actor: Hwang Jung-min; 12.12: The Day
- Best Actress: Kim Go-eun; Exhuma
- Most awards: Exhuma (4)
- Most nominations: Exhuma (12)

Television coverage
- Network: KBS; YouTube; Naver Now

The 45th Blue Dragon Film Awards (Korean: 제45회 청룡영화상) is an annual South Korean award ceremony organized by Sports Chosun (a sister brand of The Chosun Ilbo). Hosted by Han Ji-min and Lee Je-hoon, it would be held on November 29, 2024, at KBS Hall in Yeouido, Seoul. It will be broadcast live on KBS2 and KBS YouTube channels. Nominations for 15 categories were announced on October 30, Exhuma received 12 nominations.

== Nominees and winners ==
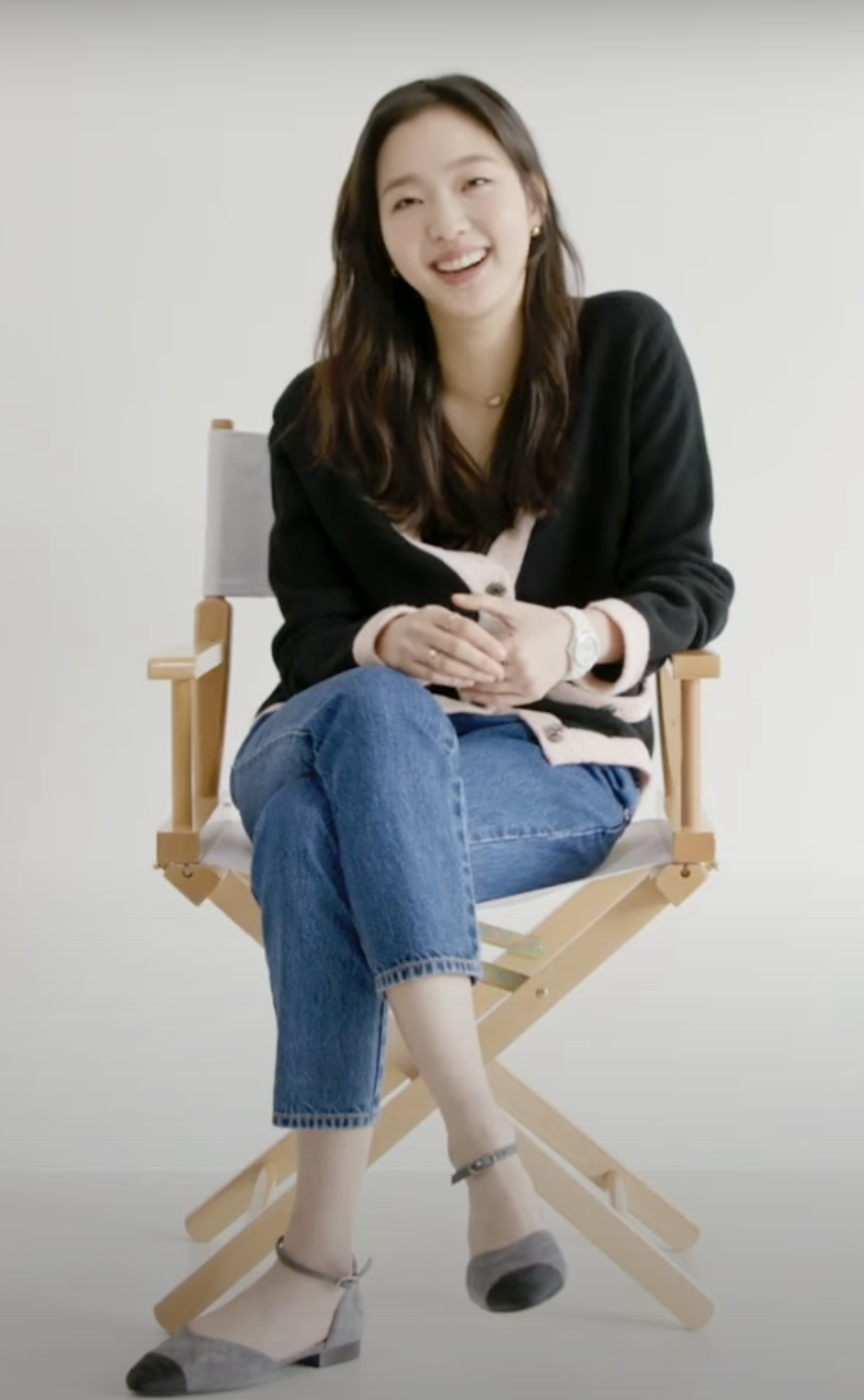
Kim Go-eun, winner of Best Actress

The nominees for the awards were announced in 15 categories on October 30, 2024.

Best Film	Best Director
12.12: The Day ‡; I, the Executioner; Exhuma; Past Lives; Handsome Guys	Jang Jae-hyun – Exhuma ‡; Kim Sung-su – 12.12: The Day; Kim Tae-yong – Wonderland; Ryoo Seung-wan – I, the Executioner; Lee Jong-pil – Escape
Best Actor	Best Actress
Hwang Jung-min – 12.12: The Day ‡; Lee Sung-min – Handsome Guys; Lee Je-hoon – Escape; Jung Woo-sung – 12.12: The Day; Choi Min-sik – Exhuma	Kim Go-eun – Exhuma ‡; Go Ah-sung – Because I Hate Korea; Ra Mi-ran – Citizen of a Kind; Jeon Do-yeon – Revolver; Tang Wei – Wonderland
Best Supporting Actor	Best Supporting Actress
Jung Hae-in – I, the Executioner ‡; Koo Kyo-hwan – Escape; Park Hae-joon – 12.12: The Day; Yoo Hae-jin – Exhuma; Lee Hee-joon – Handsome Guys	Lee Sang-hee – My Name Is Loh Kiwan ‡; Gong Seung-yeon – Handsome Guys; Yeom Hye-ran – Citizen of a Kind; Lim Ji-yeon – Revolver; Han Sun-hwa – Pilot
Best New Actor	Best New Actress
Noh Sang-hyun – Love in the Big City ‡; Kang Seung-ho – House of the Seasons; Lee Do-hyun – Exhuma; Lee Jung-ha – Victory; Joo Jong-hyuk – Because I Hate Korea	Park Joo-hyun – Drive ‡; Kwon Yu-ri – Dolphin; Lee Joo-myung – Pilot; Lee Hye-ri – Victory; Ha Yoon-kyung – Concerning My Daughter
Best New Director	Best Screenplay
Cho Hyun-chul – The Dream Songs ‡; Kim Se-hwi – Following; Nam Dong-hyub – Handsome Guys; Celine Song – Past Lives; Oh Jung-min – House of the Seasons	Jung Mi-young, Cho Hyun-chul – The Dream Songs ‡; Hong In-pyo, Hong Won-Chan, Lee Young-jong, Kim Sung-su – 12.12: The Day; Jang Jae-hyun – Exhuma; Celine Song – Past Lives; Nam Dong-hyeop – Handsome Guys
Best Editing	Best Cinematography and Lighting
Kim Sang-bum – 12.12: The Day ‡; Bae Yeon-tae – I, the Executioner; Lee Gang-hee – Escape; Jeong Byung-jin – Exhuma; Kim Sun-min – Handsome Guys	Lee Mo-gae, Lee Sung-hwan – Exhuma ‡; Kang Kuk-hyun, Kim Hyo-sung – Revolver; Choi Yeong-hwan, Lee Jae-hyuk – I, the Executioner; Lee Mo-gae, Lee Sung-hwan – 12.12: The Day; Kim Sung-an, Lee Seung-bin – Escape
Best Art Direction	Best Music
Seo Seong-gyeong – Exhuma ‡; Park Il-hyeon – Revolver; Jang Geun-young, Eun Hee-sang – 12.12: The Day; Seo Sung-gyeong – Wonderland; Bae Jung-yoon – Escape	Primary – Love in the Big City ‡; Chang Kiha – I, the Executioner; Kim Dong-wook– Victory; Dalpalan – Escape; Kim Tae-seong – Exhuma
Technical Award	Chung Jung-won Best Short Film
Yoo Sang-seob (Stunt) – I, the Executioner ‡; Cho Sang-gyeong (Costume Design) – Revolver; Jung Do-ahn (SFX) – 12.12: The Day; Park Byung-ju (VFX) – Wonderland; Lee Eun-ju (Make up) – Exhuma	Yurim ‡; D-Day, Friday; A Life of One's Own; Basil and Daisy; Not Anyone's Fault
Chung Jung-won Popular Star Award	Audience Choice Award for Most Popular Film
Koo Kyo-hwan ‡; Jung Hae-in ‡; Lim Ji-yeon ‡; Tang Wei ‡	12.12: The Day ‡; Exhuma (2nd); The Roundup: Punishment (3rd); I, the Executioner (4th); Pilot (5th)

=== Films with multiple nominations and awards ===
Films with multiple nominations
Nominations	Films
12	Exhuma
10	12.12: The Day
7	Escape
7	Handsome Guys
7	I, the Executioner
5	Revolver
4	Wonderland
3	Past Lives
3	Victory
2	Because I Hate Korea
2	Citizen of a Kind
2	House of the Seasons
2	Love in the Big City
2	The Dream Songs

Films with multiple awards
Wins	Films
4	Exhuma
3	12.12: The Day
2	I, the Executioner
2	Love in the Big City
2	The Dream Songs
