= Hard Hit =

2021 South Korean action thriller film

- Theatrical release poster
- Hangul: 발신제한
- Hanja: 發信制限
- RR: Balsin jehan
- MR: Palsin chehan
- Directed by: Kim Chang-ju
- Screenplay by: Kim Mi-hyeon
- Based on: Retribution by Alberto Marini
- Produced by: Kim Hyun-chul; Lee Dae-hee; Kim Kwon-sik; Min Kyung-wook
- Starring: Jo Woo-jin; Lee Jae-in; Ji Chang-wook
- Cinematography: Kim Tae-soo
- Edited by: Kim Chang-ju
- Music by: Kim Tae-seong
- Production companies: TPS Company; CJ Entertainment
- Distributed by: CJ Entertainment
- Release date: June 23, 2021 (South Korea)
- Running time: 94 minutes
- Country: South Korea
- Language: Korean
- Budget: ₩7 billion
- Box office: US$6.7 million

Hard Hit (Korean: 발신제한; lit. 'Restricted Call') is a 2021 South Korean action thriller film directed by Kim Chang-ju and starring Jo Woo-jin, Lee Jae-in, and Ji Chang-wook. The film depicts the unpredictable circumstances the members of an ordinary family have to deal with after a mysterious phone call puts them in a horrific situation. It is a remake of Retribution, a 2015 Spanish action thriller film directed by Dani de la Torre.

The film was theatrically released on June 23, 2021. It grossed $6.7 million domestically, becoming the fifth-highest-grossing Korean film of 2021.

== Plot ==
Seong-gyu (Jo Woo-jin), a manager of a branch of a bank in Busan, heads to work in his car with his daughter Hye-in (Lee Jae-in), who is about to take her entrance examination, and son. He gets a call, on a phone he discovers in the car's glove compartment, with a restricted caller ID (also known by the slang 'black call'). The mysterious caller informs him that there is a bomb under his seat and if he tries to get out of the car it will explode. This triggers the beginning of a nightmare situation for the Seong-gyu family in the middle of downtown Busan.

It is later revealed the mysterious caller is Jin-woo, a former employee of the chemical factory where Seong-gyu scammed all the employees of the factory in an investment that gives him the position of branch manager. Despite the effort of the employees in suing the bank, they were unable to receive back their money which caused some of them to commit suicide after losing all their life savings. It turned out that Jin-Woo's wife committed suicide along with her unborn child because of this incident. Consequently, Jin-Woo is seeking revenge against Seong-gyu for his embezzlement that cost the life of his wife and unborn child.

After forcing Seong-gyu to commit suicide by driving the car into the river, Seong-gyu decides to save both of them from drowning and surrendering himself to the police for his past crime and exposing the scam the bank has committed.

== Cast ==
- Jo Woo-jin as Lee Seong-gyu
- Lee Jae-in as Lee Hye-in, Seong-gyu's daughter
- Ji Chang-wook as Jin-woo, the phone caller
- Jin Kyung as the team leader of the explosives disposal team
- Kim Ji-ho as Yeon-su, Seong-gyu's wife
- Ryu Seung-soo as the police chief
- Jeon Seok-ho as Jung-ho
- Lee Seol as Jung-ho's wife
- Jung In-gi
- Jung Ae-yun

== Production ==
=== Casting ===
On January 13, 2020, Ji Chang-wook was confirmed to be starring in the film alongside Jo Woo-jin. Ji Chang-wook last appeared on the big screen in the 2017 film Fabricated City. It was also Kim Ji-ho's first appearance on screen after a four year break; she last appeared in the 2017 film Steel Rain.

The film is produced by TPS Company, with a production cost of ₩7 billion, and is distributed by CJ Entertainment. With this film, Kim Chang-joo made his debut as a director.

=== Filming ===
Filming began in early February 2020 in Haeundae City, a district of Busan, and wrapped in May 2020. Due to the impact of the COVID-19 pandemic, the city's roads were not crowded so the chase scenes were able to be filmed comfortably. Photos of the film being shot in Busan were released on June 23, 2021, the day of the film's release.

== Release ==
The film was released theatrically in South Korea on June 23, 2021, on 1010 screens.

It was released theatrically in Taiwan on July 22, 2021.

The film was screened at the 10th Korean Film Festival Frankfurt on October 23, 2021.

=== Home media ===
The film was made available for streaming on IPTV, TVING, Naver TV, GOM Player, Google Play, One Store, and KakaoPage from July 20, 2021.

== Reception ==
=== Box office ===
According to the integrated computer network for movie theater admissions by the Korea Film Council (KoFiC), the film attained first place at the Korean box office. As of June 23, 2021, it had amassed 57000 admissions, which was the best opening record among Korean films released in 2021. The film maintained its first place during the first week by mobilising 39,277, 47,505, 105,496 100,912, 35,743 and 35,114 admissions on the second, third, fourth, fifth, sixth and seventh days, respectively. The admission total at the end of the seventh day was 421,581.

According to the Korean Film Council, as of November 15, 2021, it stands at fifth place among all the Korean films released in the year 2021, with a gross of US$7.78 million and 955,809 admissions.

=== Critical response ===
Lee Da-won, writing for Sports Trend, opined that the power of the story lay in the conveyance of the message of 'human morality' and 'family love' alongside the thrills. Da-won praised Jo Woo-jin for expressing tension, remorse, and apologetic feelings with facial expressions as for 80% of the film he acts from the confined space of a driver's seat. She felt that Ji Chang-wook is a new find in completely different role in this film, and recommended that audiences head back to the theatre to see the film.

Yang So-young, writing for Star Today, praised the performance of actors Lee Jae-in and Jo Woo-jin. Writing about Jo Woo-jin, So-young said, "Jo Woo-jin persuasively portrays the fear, tension, urgency, and fatherly love that Seong-gyu feels in a confined and enclosed space." In conclusion, So-young wrote, "Literally no smoke holes, the second half may be disappointing depending on the audience, but you can enjoy 94 minutes."

Kim Young-sik, reviewing for Within News, praised the performance of Jo Woo-jin and wrote, "A work that definitely stands out for actor Jo Woo-jin's passionate performance." Young-sik also praised the car chase scenes, and noted that these are a standout for a solo lead.

Choo Seung-hyun of Seoul Economy praised the performances of Jo Woo-jin and Lee Jae-in. Highlighting the strengths of director Kim, who has previously worked as a film editor, Seung-hyun wrote, "The audience follows the same timeline as the main character, giving the impression of being right next to each other..." Seung-hyun liked the runtime of the film and wrote, "The running time of 94 minutes, which is neither too long nor too short, was expressed plainly without any fuss."

Jeon Hyeong-hwa, reviewing for Star News, wrote that the film is a familiar scenario so, to make it seem more fresh, the film was kept pacey. He praised the performances of Jo Woo-jin and Lee Jae-in. He noted that the charm of Busan is fully captured on a large screen, and concluded, "A movie proves that it tastes good only when it is seen in a theatre."

== Awards and nominations ==
| Year | Awards | Category | Recipient | Result | Ref. |
|---|---|---|---|---|---|
| 2021 | 30th Buil Film Awards | Best Supporting Actress | Lee Jae-in | Nominated | |
| 2021 | 42nd Blue Dragon Film Awards | Best New Director | Kim Chang-ju | Nominated | |
| 2021 | 42nd Blue Dragon Film Awards | Best Editing Award | Kim Chang-ju | Nominated | |
| 2022 | 58th Baeksang Arts Awards | Best New Director | Kim Chang-ju | Nominated | |
