= Oh! My Guard =

2026 South Korean television series

- Promotional poster
- Hangul: 밑도 끝도 없이 너다
- Lit.: No Matter What, It's You
- RR: Mitdo kkeutdo eopsi neoda
- MR: Mitto kkŭtto ŏpsi nŏda
- Genre: Romantic comedy
- Written by: Byun Sang-soon
- Directed by: Yoon Jong-ho; Lee Seung-hoon
- Starring: Jung Yong-hwa; Hong Seung-hee
- Country of origin: South Korea
- Original language: Korean
- No. of episodes: 10

Production
- Production companies: People Story Company; Syn&Studio

Original release
- Network: Lifetime
- Release: October 24, 2026 – present

Oh! My Guard (Korean: 밑도 끝도 없이 너다) is an ongoing South Korean romantic comedy television series written by Byun Sang-soon and directed by Yoon Jong-ho and Lee Seung-hoon. Starring Jung Yong-hwa and Hong Seung-hee, the series follows an actor who meets a woman who believes she is the female lead in a drama. It premiered on Lifetime on October 24, 2026 at 22:50 (KST). It is also available for streaming on Viu in selected regions.

== Cast ==
- Jung Yong-hwa as Um Tae-bong, a Hallyu star and melodrama actor opposed to on-screen kissing.
- Hong Seung-hee as Oh Hae-ra, daughter of a chaebol family who actually lives as a recluse while hiding a painful past. After an accident, she believes she is 'Cha Hong-doo', the female lead in a drama where Um Tae-bong is the lead actor.
- Lee Yi-kyung as Han Jung-woo, the man who saw Oh Hae-ra in England during his childhood and came back to South Korea to find her.
- Park You-na as Song Na-ri, an idol girl group member who transitioned as a famous actress who fell in love with Um Tae-bong but always tangled up with Han Jung-woo.
- Han Chae-ah as So Hyun-joo, the ex-girlfriend of Um Tae-bong's late brother who was actually his first love.

== Production ==
=== Development ===
The romantic comedy series is written by Byun Sang-soon, directed by Yoon Jong-ho (who previously helmed Lovely Runner) and Lee Seung-hoon, and produced jointly by Syn&Studio and People Story Company.

=== Casting ===
Casting announcements began in September 2021 with Jung Yong-hwa as the male lead. The following month, Hong Seung-hee was cast as the female lead and Lee Yi-kyung joined the main cast. Han Chae-ah was added to the cast in December 2021, and Park You-na joined the cast in April 2022.

=== Filming ===
Filming concluded in the first half of 2022.

== Release ==
Oh! My Guard was initially reported for OTT distribution but was ultimately scheduled as a broadcast television drama. The series is scheduled to premiere on Lifetime on October 24, 2026, at 22:50 (KST).

It will also be available for streaming on Viu in selected regions.

In Japan, the local distributor ACROSS acquired the distribution rights for the drama. On October 13, 2026, the company announced that Lemino has been chosen as the local streaming platform for the series.
