= Lee Jae-in =

South Korean actress (born 2004)

- 이재인
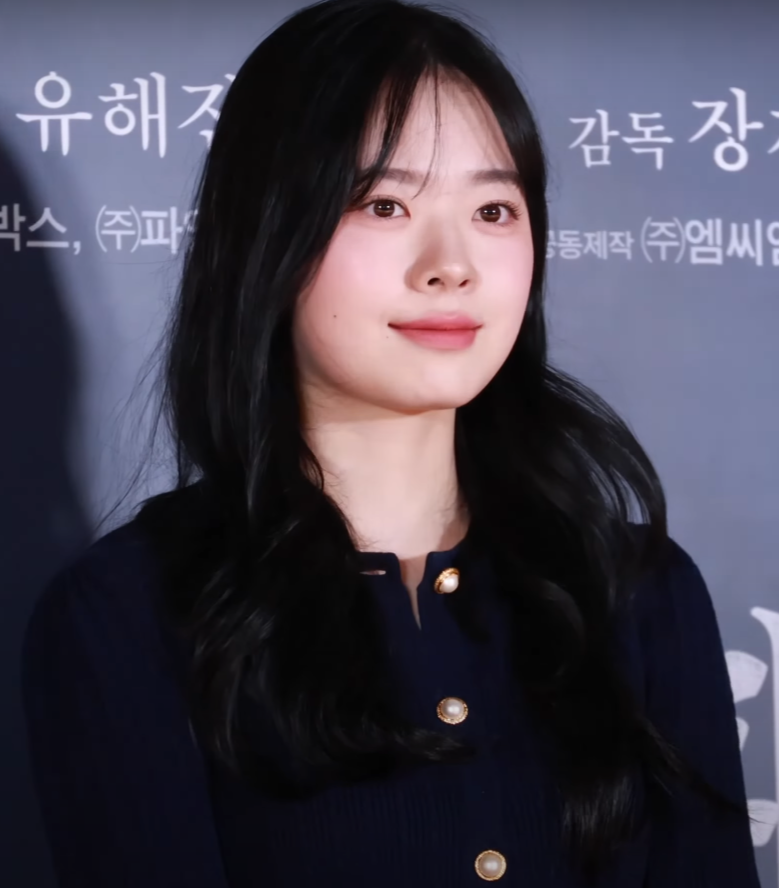
- Lee in February 2024
- Born: February 6, 2004 (age 22); Taebaek, Gangwon Province, South Korea
- Occupation: Actress
- Years active: 2012–present
- Agent: Yooborn Company

Korean name
- Hangul: 이재인
- Hanja: 李在仁
- RR: I Jaein
- MR: I Chaein

Lee Jae-in (Korean: 이재인; born February 6, 2004) is a South Korean actress. She first gained recognition through the mystery film Svaha: The Sixth Finger (2019). Other notable works include Racket Boys (2021) and Hi-Five (2025).

== Career ==
Lee Jae-in is one of the few South Korean celebrities born in Gangwon, a border province with North Korea. Lee debuted in 2012 as the child counterpart of a supporting character in Ice Adonis.

Her first prominent casting was for 2019 religious mystery film Svaha: The Sixth Finger. Her portrayal of two different twin girls earned her various wins and nominations from major film awards. The same year, Lee also played her first regular role in television series with JTBC's Beautiful World.

In 2021 Lee was cast in JTBC's legal espionage series Undercover and SBS' sport drama Racket Boys as a national youth badminton team's ace athlete. The same year she got praised for her role in the ticking clock-thriller film Hard Hit.

In January 2023, Lee signed with Yooborn Company.

At the age of 21, Lee got nominated for Best Actress at the prestigious 2025 46th Blue Dragon Film Awards for her role as a young girl with superpowers in the action fantasy Hi-Five, the second-youngest nominee for the category after Jun Ji-hyun in 2001.

In 2026, Lee joined the cast of tvN's slice-of-life romance series Spring Fever.

== Filmography ==
=== Film ===
| Year | Title | Role | Notes | Ref. |
|---|---|---|---|---|
| 2013 | Happiness for Sale | | | |
| 2014 | No Tears for the Dead | Daeban granddaughter | | |
| 2014 | Futureless Things | | | |
| 2015 | School 2015 | Ra-Jin | | |
| 2016 | Horror Stories 3 Machine Ghost | Dunko | | |
| 2017 | I Can Speak | Jung-shim (young) | | |
| 2017 | Tombstone Refugee | Da-bin | | |
| 2017 | Survival Guide | Older Sister | | |
| 2018 | At Her Own Pace | Woo-ju | | |
| 2018 | Adulthood | Hwang Kyung-eon | | |
| 2018 | Our Body | Yoon Hwa-young | | |
| 2019 | Svaha: The Sixth Finger | Lee Geum-hwa / "It" | | |
| 2019 | The Battle: Roar to Victory | Choon-hee | | |
| 2021 | Hard Hit | Lee Hye-in | | |
| 2021 | Heaven: To the Land of Happiness | TBA | | |
| 2025 | Hi-Five | Park Wan-seo | | |
| 2025 | Concrete Market | Hee-ro | | |

=== Television series ===
| Year | Title | Role | Notes | Ref. |
|---|---|---|---|---|
| 2012 | Ice Adonis | Ha Yoon-hee (young) | | |
| 2012 | Quiz from God 3 | Ha-young | | |
| 2012–2013 | Family | Da-young | | |
| 2013 | Samsaengi | Jung Yoon-hee (young) | | |
| 2014 | Modern Farmer | Min Gi's little sister | Cameo | |
| 2014 | KBS Drama Special: "The Last Puzzle" | So Hee | | |
| 2015 | Who Are You: School 2015 | Ra-jin | | |
| 2015 | Sense 8 Season 1 | Seon (young) | Cameo | |
| 2015–2016 | Six Flying Dragons | | | |
| 2017 | Sense 8 Season 2 | Seon (young) | Cameo | |
| 2018 | Drama Stage: "Slide to Unlock" | Yeo-na | | |
| 2019 | Beautiful World | Han Dong-hee | | |
| 2020 | Hospital Playlist | So-mi | Cameo (Episode 11) | |
| 2021 | Undercover | Han Seung-mi | | |
| 2021 | Racket Boys | Han Se-yoon | | |
| 2022 | O'PENing: "The First Glance" | Yoon-jae | one act-drama; season 5 | |
| 2023 | Night Has Come | Lee Yoon-seo | | |
| 2025 | Our Unwritten Seoul | teen Yoo Mi-ji / Yoo Mi-rae | | |
| 2025 | Concrete Market | Choi Hee-ro | | |
| 2025 | The Price of Confession | Koo Hui-yeong | | |
| 2026 | Spring Fever | Choi Se-jin | | |

== Accolades ==
=== Awards and nominations ===
Name of the award ceremony, year presented, category, nominee of the award, and the result of the nomination
| Award | Year | Category | Nominee / Work | Result | Ref. |
|---|---|---|---|---|---|
| Baeksang Arts Awards | 2019 | Best New Actress – Film | Svaha: The Sixth Finger | Won | |
| Blue Dragon Film Awards | 2019 | Best New Actress | Svaha: The Sixth Finger | Nominated | |
| Blue Dragon Film Awards | 2025 | Best Actress | Hi-Five | Nominated | |
| Buil Film Awards | 2019 | Best New Actress | Svaha: The Sixth Finger | Nominated | |
| Buil Film Awards | 2021 | Best Supporting Actress | Hard Hit | Nominated | |
| Golden Cinema Film Festival | 2019 | Best New Actress | Svaha: The Sixth Finger | Won | |
| Grand Bell Awards | 2018 | Best New Actress | Adulthood | Nominated | |
| Grand Bell Awards | 2020 | Best New Actress | Svaha: The Sixth Finger | Nominated | |
| SBS Drama Awards | 2021 | Best Young Actress | Racket Boys | Won | |
| Wildflower Film Awards | 2019 | Best New Actress | Adulthood | Won | |

=== Listicles ===
Name of publisher, year listed, name of listicle, and placement
| Publisher | Year | Listicle | Placement | Ref. |
|---|---|---|---|---|
| Korean Film Council | 2021 | Korean Actors 200 (Note: Introduces 200 actors that best represent the present and future of Korean cinema to the people in the film industry all over the world.) | Included | |
