= Hong Seung-hee =

South Korean actress (born 1997)

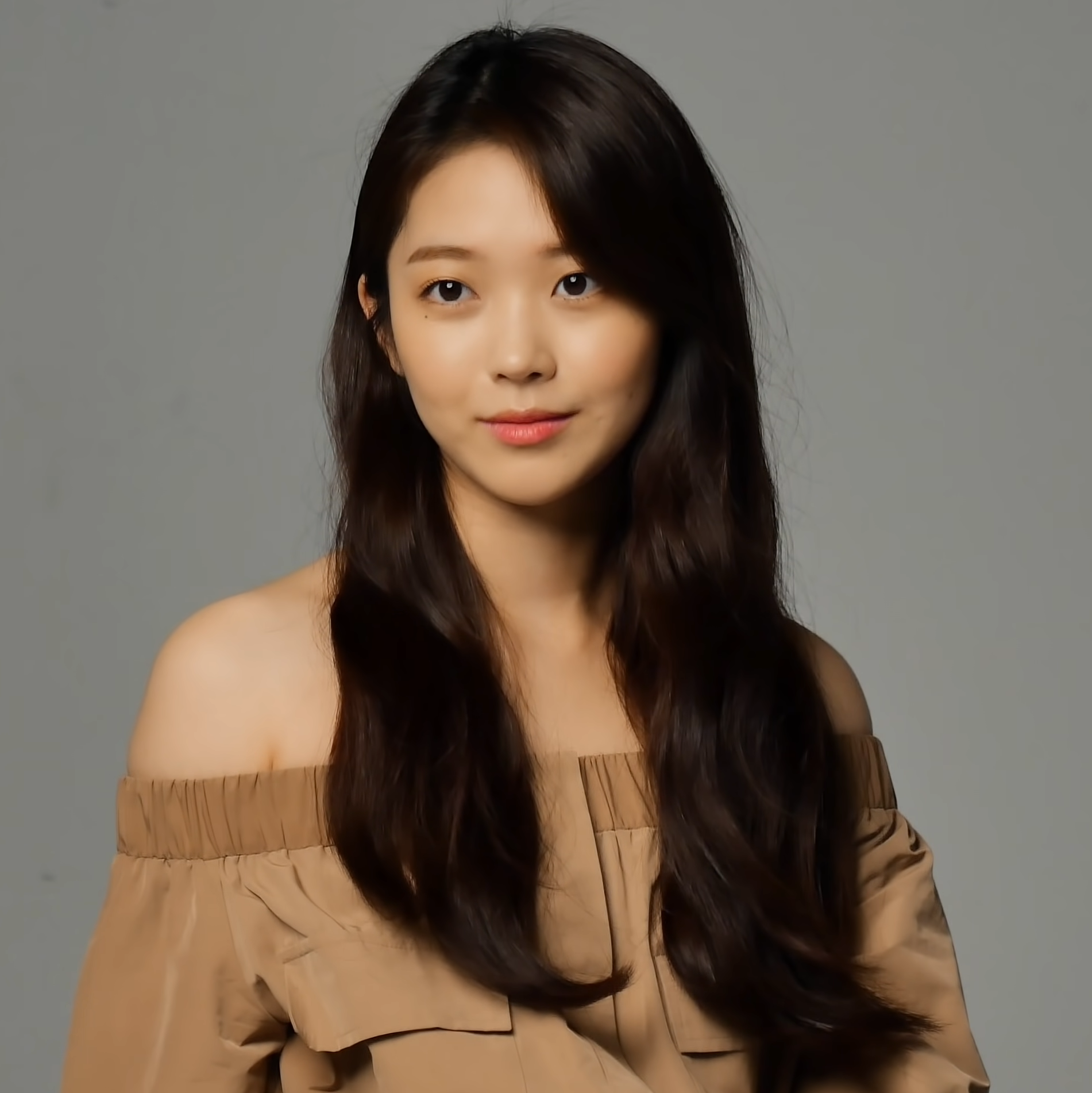
- Hong in 2021
- Born: 19 August 1997 (age 29); Hwaseong, Gyeonggi, South Korea
- Occupation: Actress
- Years active: 2018–present
- Agent: C-JeS Entertainment

Korean name
- Hangul: 홍승희
- RR: Hong Seunghui
- MR: Hong Sŭnghŭi

Hong Seung-hee (born 19 August 1997) is a South Korean actress. She is known for her roles in dramas such as Just Dance, Navillera, and Move to Heaven. She also appeared in movie Pawn as Seung-yi.

== Career ==
Hong debuted with KBS drama Just Dance in 2018. In 2019, she participated in the third season of Voice, making a special appearance in episodes 1–2. Later that year, she participated in the KBS drama I Wanna Hear Your Song and the TV Chosun drama Leverage.

In 2020, Hong made a special appearance in the tvN drama Memorist and joined the TV Chosun drama Kingmaker: The Change of Destiny. She also made her film debut in Pawn.

In 2021, Hong appeared in the tvN drama Navillera as the granddaughter of protagonist Park In-hwan's character. Later in May, she appeared in the Netflix drama Move to Heaven, acting as the childhood friend of Tang Jun-sang's role.

== Filmography ==
=== Film ===
Year	Title	Role	Notes	Ref.
2020	Pawn	teenage Seung-yi		
2023	The Moon	Han-byeol		
2023	Behind The Shadows	Lee Seol		

=== Television series ===
Year	Title	Role	Notes	Ref.
2018	Just Dance	Kim Joo-hyun		
2019	Voice	Mi-hye	Cameo (season 3, episode 1–2)	
2019	I Wanna Hear Your Song	Yang Soo-jang		
2019	Leverage	Yoo-jin		
2020	Memorist	Lee Bo-yun	Cameo (episode 1–2)	
2020	Kingmaker: The Change of Destiny	Lee Bong-ryun (ํyoung)	Cameo (episode 1–3,6, 13–14,21)	
2021	Navillera	Shim Eun-ho		
2023	KBS Drama Special 2023	Seol		
2023	KBS Drama Special: TV Cinema - Behind the Shadows	Seol		
2025	To the Moon	Jung Da-hee		
2026	Oh! My Guard	Oh Hae-ra / Cha Hong-do		

=== Web series ===
Year	Title	Role	Ref.
2019	Kiss Scene in Yeonnamdong	Yoon-sol	
2021	Move to Heaven	Yoon Na-moo	

== Awards and nominations ==
Name of the award ceremony, year presented, category, nominee of the award, and the result of the nomination
Award ceremony	Year	Category	Nominee / Work	Result	Ref.
KBS Drama Awards	2023	Best New Actress	Behind the Shadows	Won	
