= Wonderland (2024 film) =

2024 film by Kim Tae-yong

- Theatrical release poster
- Hangul: 원더랜드
- RR: Wondeoraendeu
- MR: Wŏndŏraendŭ
- Directed by: Kim Tae-yong
- Written by: Kim Tae-yong; Min Ye-ji
- Produced by: Oh Jeong-wan; Park Kwan-soo
- Starring: Tang Wei; Bae Suzy; Park Bo-gum; Jung Yu-mi; Choi Woo-shik
- Cinematography: Kim Seong-jin; Park Hong-yeol
- Edited by: Kim Hyung-ju
- Music by: Bang Jun-seok; Dalpalan; Kang Seong-su
- Production companies: Bom Film Productions; Kirin Productions
- Distributed by: Acemaker Movieworks
- Release date: June 5, 2024
- Running time: 113 minutes
- Country: South Korea
- Languages: Korean; Mandarin
- Budget: ₩18 billion
- Box office: $4.3 million

Wonderland (Korean: 원더랜드) is a 2024 South Korean science fiction romantic drama film written and directed by Kim Tae-yong, and starring Tang Wei, Bae Suzy, Park Bo-gum, Jung Yu-mi, and Choi Woo-shik. The story follows a group of people who interact with an artificial intelligence program to communicate with AI generated versions of their deceased loved ones. It was released theatrically on June 5, 2024, and on Netflix on July 26, 2024.

== Plot ==
An archeologist named Bai Li sets out on an expedition in the desert while making frequent calls to her young daughter Bai Jia. Jeong-in, a flight attendant, is often calling her boyfriend Tae-joo, an astronaut. Both Bai Li's family and Jeong-in are customers of Wonderland, an artificial intelligence system that allows people to communicate with their departed loved ones through simulated video calls. Jeong-in brings the real Tae-joo home after he awakens from his coma.

Hae-ri, a Wonderland manager, fields video calls from her parents, who tease her about her relationship with her junior, Hyeon-soo. Hae-ri and Hyeon-soo handle the case of a grandmother whose dead grandson in the Wonderland system is exploiting her, and that of Yong-sik, a dying man whom Hyeon-soo suspects is his biological father.

Bai Li's mother Hwa-ran considers ending the service and telling her granddaughter that Li has passed away. Meanwhile, Jeong-in becomes uncomfortable with how Tae-joo has changed since he woke up, and begins to turn to the Wonderland version of him. Tae-joo is suspected of starting a fire in their apartment building, frustrating Jeong-in further. A suspicious Tae-joo visits Jeong-in at her gate and learns of her Wonderland subscription; he emotionally bids her goodbye at the gate.

While at the airport Hwa-ran loses track of Jia, and her Wonderland service is deactivated while searching for the girl. Within the program Bai Li attempts to leave and help find her daughter but is stopped by various roadblocks. She eventually drives through a sandstorm, approaching the operating system and causing glitches in other simulacra despite Hae-ri and Hyeon-soo's attempts to stop her. They summon Sung-joon, who lets Bai Li enter the central server. Hae-ri, having lost her own parents, allows Bai Li to move to the airport network, where she asks the Wonderland subscribers to help her find her daughter. Tae-joo rescues Jia, who accepts her mother's death. Jeong-in tells Tae-joo why she subscribed to Wonderland. She deactivates her service and the two reconcile. In the epilogue, Hyeon-soo introduces his mother to the Wonderland version of Yong-sik.

== Cast ==
- Tang Wei as Bai Li
- Bae Suzy as Jeong-in
- Park Bo-gum as Tae-joo
- Jung Yu-mi as Hae-ri
- Choi Woo-shik as Hyeon-soo
- Nina Paw as Hwa-ran
- Sung Byung-sook as Song Jeong-ran
- Choi Moo-sung as Lee Yong-sik
- Song Duk-ho as Yong-sik's son
- Tang Jun-sang as Choi Jin-gu, Jeong-ran's grandson
- Lee Eol as Hae-ri's father
- Kang Ae-shim as Hae-ri's mother
- Jeon Su-ji as Jeong-in's colleague
- Darcy Paquet as Danny
- Gong Yoo as Sung-joon
- Kim Sung-ryung as Hyeon-soo's mother

== Production ==
=== Development ===
The project was conceived in June 2019. Kim Tae-yong wrote the screenplay and directed the film nine years after his last film, Late Autumn, which was released in 2010.

=== Casting ===
On June 26, 2019, Bae Suzy received an offer to appear in the film. On July 2, 2019, Choi Woo-shik's agency was reported to be considering a proposal to appear in the film. On September 25, 2019, Park Bo-gum's agency reported that they have reviewed an offer to appear in the film. In August 2019, a representative from the production team reported that Tang Wei was considering the lead role in her husband's film. On November 11, 2019 it was reported that Jung Yu-mi joined the cast. On March 11, 2020 it was reported that Gong Yoo will appear as Tang's husband in the film.

=== Filming ===
Principal photography began in April 2020. In July 2020, the film was shot in studios in Paju, Gyeonggi Province and Jeonju. Filming was completed in September 2020, except for some scenes featuring Tang Wei, which were scheduled for filming in January 2021.

== Release ==
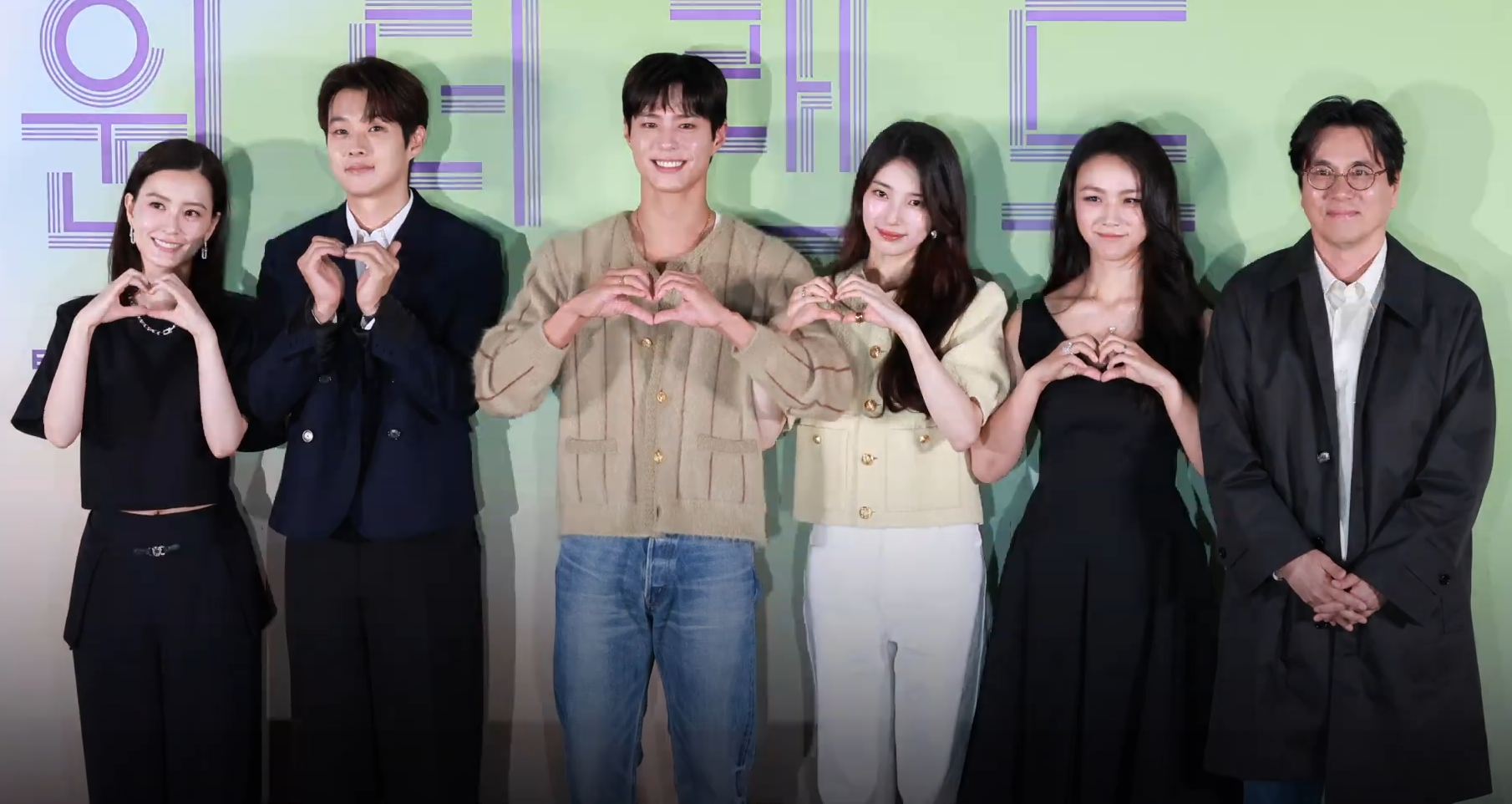
Actors Jung Yu-mi, Choi Woo-shik, Park Bo-gum, Bae Suzy, Tang Wei, and director Kim Tae-yong (L-R) at the premiere of the film, June 2024

On October 22, 2020, distributors Acemaker Movieworks and Netflix reached an agreement that the film would be released worldwide by Netflix except in South Korea and China. Netflix disclosed that they were in discussion with Acemaker for overseas releases since the beginning of filming. After long negotiations, Acemaker finally agreed to a contract with Netflix for about 30% of post-production cost. Wonderland was released in theaters in South Korea on June 5, 2024, and on Netflix on July 26, 2024.

== Reception ==
=== Box office ===
The film was released on June 5, 2024 in 1,165 screens. It opened at first place in the Korean box office with 94,777 admissions and a gross of US$615,180, it retained its first place for next three days. As of July 19, 2024, the film has grossed US$4,263,745 from 625,348 admissions.

=== Viewership ===
After its release on Netflix, Wonderland entered the Top 10 Global Non-English Films for two weeks peaking at #9 and ranked in the Top 10 Most Watched List in eight countries.

=== Accolades ===
Award ceremony	Year	Category	Nominee / Work	Result	Ref.
Blue Dragon Film Awards	2024	Best Director	Kim Tae-yong	Nominated	
Blue Dragon Film Awards	2024	Best Actress	Tang Wei	Nominated	
Blue Dragon Film Awards	2024	Popular Star Award	Tang Wei	Won	
Blue Dragon Film Awards	2024	Best Art Direction	Seo Seong-gyeong	Nominated	
Blue Dragon Film Awards	2024	Technical Award	Park Byung-ju	Nominated	
Baeksang Arts Awards	2025	Best Technical Achievement	Park Byung-ju	Nominated	
