= Love in the Big City =

Love in the Big City refers to:

- Love in the Big City (2009 film), a Russian film
- Love in the Big City (novel), a South Korean novel
  - Love in the Big City (2024 film), a 2024 South Korean film based on the novel of the same name
  - Love in the Big City (TV series), a 2024 South Korean television series based on the novel of the same name
