= Jennifer Russell =

Jennifer Russell may refer to:

- Jennifer Russell (lacrosse), American lacrosse player
- Jennifer Russell (physician), Canadian physician and health official
- Jennifer Russell (tennis) (born 1978), American tennis player
- Jennifer Russell (translator), Danish translator
