= Bovrup =

Town in Southern Denmark

Bovrup Baurup (German)
- Town
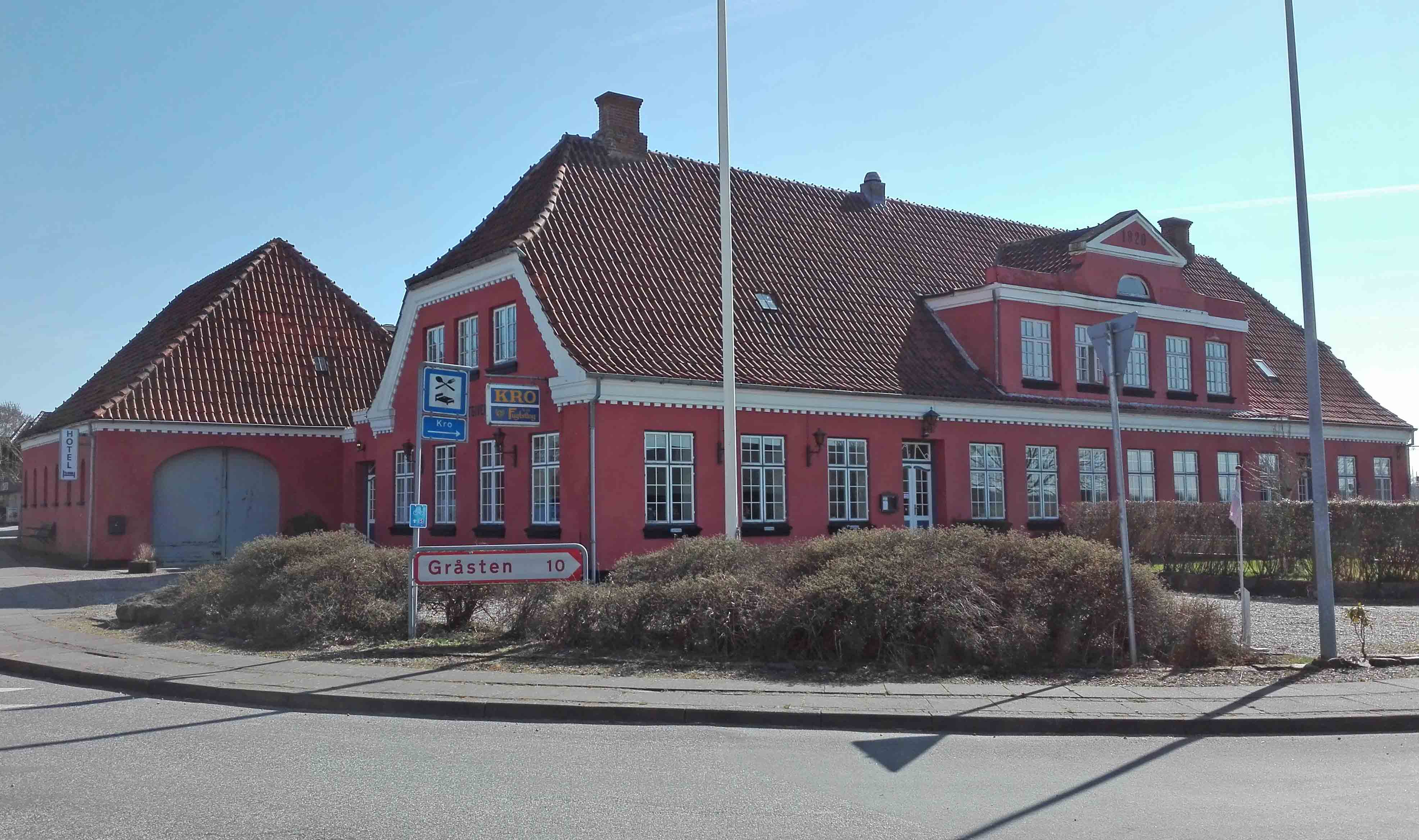

- Location in Region of Southern Denmark Bovrup (Denmark)
- Coordinates: 54°59′48″N 9°34′54″E
- Country: Denmark
- Region: Southern Denmark
- Municipality: Aabenraa
- Parish: Varnæs Parish

Area
  - Urban: 0.39 km^{2} (0.15 sq mi)

Population (2026)
  - Urban: 459
  - Urban density: 1,200/km^{2} (3,000/sq mi)
- Time zone: UTC+1 (CET)
  - Summer (DST): UTC+2 (CEST)
- Postal code: DK-6200 Aabenraa
- Website: www.aabenraa.dk

Bovrup (German: Baurup) is a town in Aabenraa Municipality, Southern Jutland, with a population of 459 as of 1 January 2026. It is located 2 km south of Varnæs, 6 km east of Felsted, 12 km north of Gråsten and 14 km southeast of Aabenraa. From 1970 to 2006, the town was part of Lundtoft Municipality.

== History ==
Bovrup has had two inns, multiple grocery stores and craftspeople, a mill, a dairy, and a school.

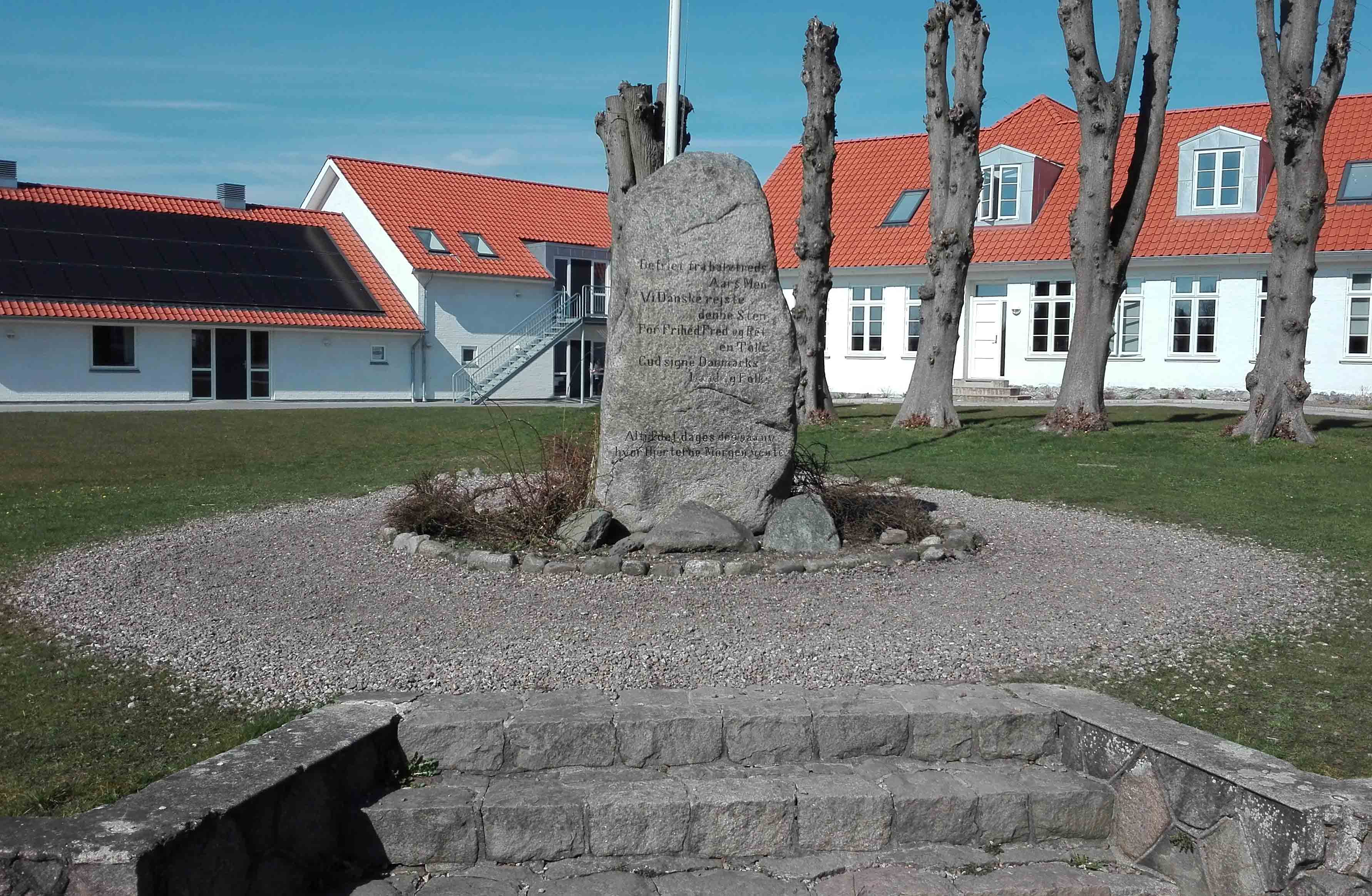
The Reunification Stone in Bovrup

The Reunification Stone, located where Varnæsvej and Bovrup Storegade meet, was unveiled on 15 June 1930 in commemoration of the 1920 Schleswig plebiscites.

== Famous People ==
- Frits Clausen (1893–1947) lived in Bovrup from 1924 to 1945. He was chairman of the National Socialist Workers' Party of Denmark from 1933 to 1944. He kept the party's membership file, which after World War II became known as the Bovrup-kartoteket.
- Solvej Balle (born 16 August 1962, in Bovrup) is a Danish author. Her breakthrough novel was "Ifølge Loven" (published in 1993), which gave her a central position in 1990's Danish literature.
