= Se-hee =

- Hangul: 세희
- RR: Sehui
- MR: Sehŭi

Se-hee (Korean: 세희), also spelled Se-hui or Se-whee, is a Korean given name. Notable people and fictional characters with the name include:

== Real people ==
- Baek Se-hee (1990–2025), South Korean author
- Cho Se-hui (1942–2022), Korean author
- Cho Se-whee (born 1991), South Korean model
- Kim Se-hee, South Korean modern pentathlete
- Lee Se-hee (born 1991), South Korean actress

== Fictional characters ==
=== Mononymous ===
- Se-hee, in the 2012 film Don't Click
- Se-hee, in the 2014 film The Plan
- Se-hee, in the 2014 film The Tunnel

=== With surname ===
- Jung Se-hee, in the 2014 film Mourning Grave
- Lee Se-hee, in the 2010 film Death Bell 2: Bloody Camp
- Na Se-hee, in the 2012 television series Still You
- Nam Se-hee, in the 2017 television series Because This Is My First Life
- Yoon Se-hee, in the 2020 film Collectors
