= Love in the Big City (novel) =

Novel by Sang Young Park

- Author: Sang Young Park
- Original title: 대도시의 사랑법
- Translator: Anton Hur
- Publisher: Changbi
- Publication date: July 1, 2019
- Publication place: Republic of Korea

Love in the Big City (Korean: 대도시의 사랑법; RR: Daedosi-ui sarangbeop; lit. ''How to Love in the Big City'') is a novel by Sang Young Park. This is his second novel, a collection of four interconnected short stories, including the Young Writers' Prize winner "A Bite of Rockfish, Taste the Universe". It was published on July 1, 2019 in South Korea by Changbi Publishers.

The original novel has been translated and published in 15 countries. Its English translation was published in 2021 by Grove Atlantic in the US and Tilted Axis Press in the UK, with Anton Hur as the translator.

It was longlisted for the International Booker Prize 2022, the International Dublin Literary Award 2023, and the Prix Medicis award for foreign literature 2024.

== Development ==
In an interview with KBS News on December 26, 2021, Park stated that big cities are a better place for minorities to meet one another, as they are spaces where more people naturally gather. He also expressed the view that big cities symbolize modern life and declared that "We are surrounded by many people all day long, but I think the more we are surrounded, the more solitary we become," adding that the spatial quality of the city is a central theme of the novel. According to Park, the novel was titled Love in the Big City because he believes that within such urban spaces, what may appear to be a unique or marginalized form of love could ultimately be understood as a universal one.

== Content ==
The narrator, Park Young, is a gay man who is HIV positive. He refers to the HIV virus as "Kylie" as in Kylie Minogue. He majored in the French language in university. His mother is an Evangelical Christian; Kirkus Reviews refers to her as "acidic" and "ailing". At one time his mother sent him to a gay conversion therapy center.

The novel jumps around in time instead of having a progressive linear development. The majority of the book chronicle's the narrator's time with long time partner Gyu-ho. It also includes a female character named Jaehee, a fellow French major, who becomes the narrator's friend while he is in his 20s. The narrator and Jaehee live in an apartment for a time and discuss their love lives. They distance after Jaehee marries and the narrator moves back with his parents.

The novel is divided into four sections, each with one narrative.

== Reception ==
In South Korea it made the best seller list.

Literary critic Kim Gun-hyung said, "Love in the Big City is a departure from the tragic and epic representation of queer people as objects of ethical mercy or the need for a serious resistance movement. It is an everyday story told in the voice of a queer youth of our time who lives with hatred, laughs, cries, breaks up, loves, and lives together without giving up."

Bobby Finger of The New York Times wrote that the English version "reads like an iPhone screen, vibrant and addictive." He concluded the book is "dazzling".

Kirkus concluded it is "addictive, profound novel" that would "sweep readers up in its sheer longing", although it criticized the ending because it "drags just a bit".

Publishers Weekly gave the book a starred review and called it "Brilliant, glowing, and fun" as well as "stunning", stating that the English version "succeeds in bringing Park’s effervescent voice to English-reading audiences."

The Skinny stated that the English version is "gorgeous" and "captures the wit and bite of Park's voice, which cuts through the novel's romantic tenor like a blade."

Anton Hur described the writing style as easy to translate, with what he jokingly called "an Anglo-Saxon vibe". He said that Love in the Big City has a very urban sensibility, and that there is something cosmopolitan and transnational about cities, which makes Park's style lends itself extremely well to English translation. Hur stated that he preferred the writing style of the author to the characters.

== Adaptations ==
Love in a Big City was adapted into a movie and TV series of the same name.

A film based on the novel was released on October 1, 2024, with Kim Go-eun starring as Jae-hee and Noh Sang-hyun starring as the character Heung-soo (the novel's Young). The film only adapts the Jae-hee chapter of the novel.

A TV adaptation was released on October 21, 2024 on TVING. It is a faithful adaptation of the original novel and stars Nam Yoon-su as Go Young.
