= Your Utopia =

2024 short story collection by Bora Chung

- Author: Bora Chung
- Translator: Anton Hur
- Publisher: Algonquin Books
- Publication date: January 30, 2024
- Pages: 256
- ISBN: 978-1-643-75621-9

Your Utopia is a 2024 short story collection by Bora Chung. The collection was translated into English by Anton Hur.

== Overview ==
The collection contains eight short stories:

1. "The Center for Immortality Research"
2. "The End of the Voyage"
3. "A Very Ordinary Marriage"
4. "Maria, Gratia Plena"
5. "Your Utopia"
6. "A Song for Sleep"
7. "Seed"
8. "To Meet Her"

== Development history ==
Your Utopia is Chung's second short story collection to be translated into English, after her 2022 collection Cursed Bunny. Like her previous work, Your Utopia was translated by Anton Hur.

=== Publication history ===
The book was published in the United States by Algonquin Books on January 30, 2024. It was published in Australia by Scribe Publications on the same date. It was published in the United Kingdom by Honford Star on February 13, 2024.

== Reception ==
Your Utopia received praise from critics upon release. Publishers Weekly praised Hur's translation for not containing any "pandering to a potentially unaware Western audience" and noted the title story as a highlight of the collection. Kirkus Reviews directed praise at the individual stories for having unique premises. The Hindu wrote positively about the translation and the "element of strangeness" in each story. ArtReview directed praise at the collection's humor, while the Chicago Review of Books positively described Chung as being "a complex writer." A lengthy review in Strange Horizons praised Chung for embracing more science-fiction elements than her previous work and concluded that Chung was a "formidable voice in global speculative fiction."

The AU Review was more critical, describing the quality of the stories as being inconsistent but recommending the collection to fans of Cursed Bunny. The Arts Fuse had a similar critique, specifically naming the stories "Seeds" and "To Meet Her" as weak points. NPR published a negative review, writing that some stories were "underdeveloped," that others had plot twists "tacked on," and comparing Chung's prose to "something that might be churned out by ChatGPT."
