= Varnæs =

Town in Southern Denmark

Varnæs Warnitz (German)
- Town
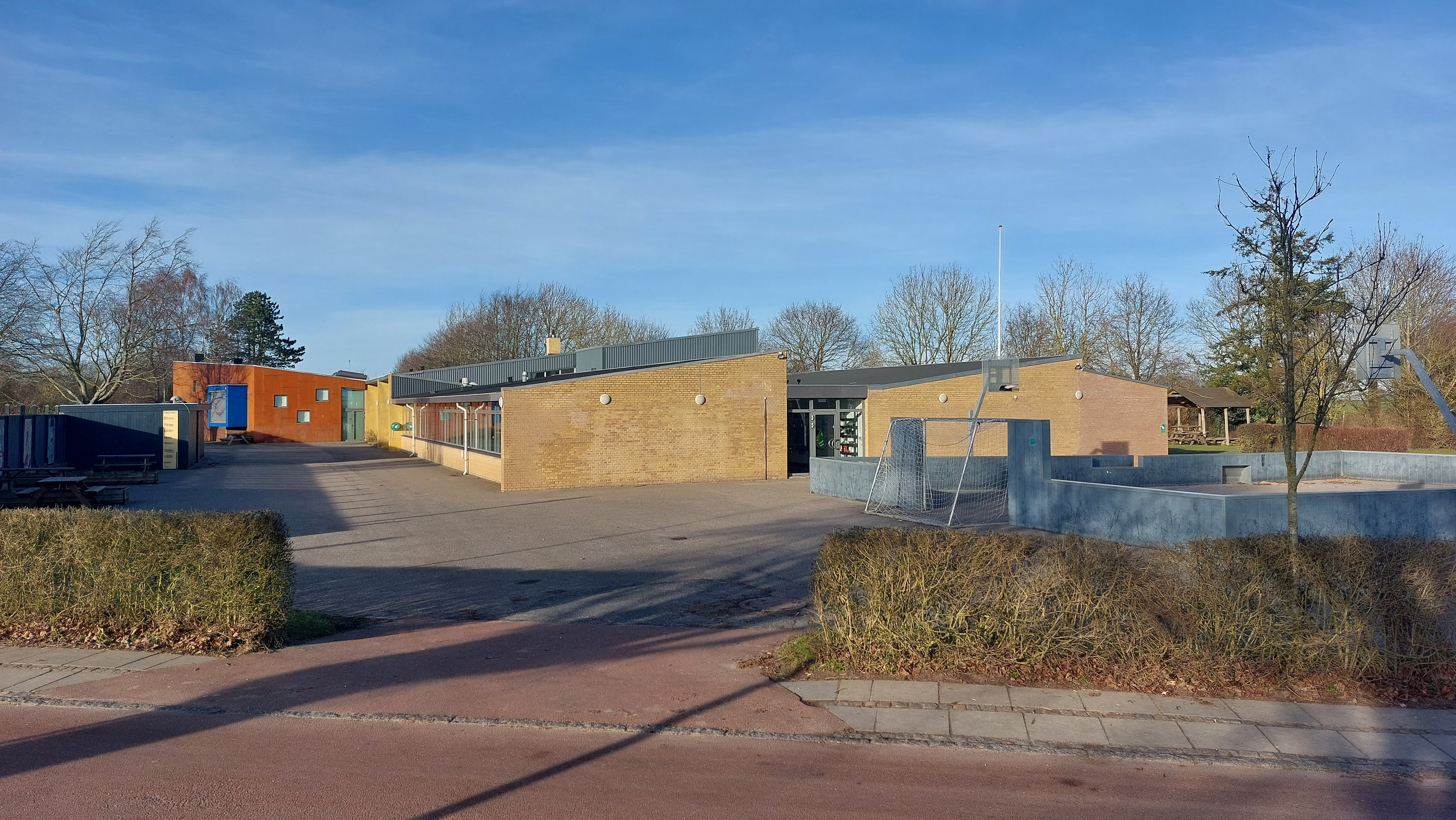
- Varnæs School

- Location in Region of Southern Denmark Varnæs (Denmark)
- Coordinates: 55°0′50″N 9°34′7″E
- Country: Denmark
- Region: Southern Denmark
- Municipality: Aabenraa

Area
  - Urban: 0.4 km^{2} (0.15 sq mi)

Population (2026)
  - Urban: 408
  - Urban density: 1,000/km^{2} (2,600/sq mi)
- Time zone: UTC+1 (CET)
  - Summer (DST): UTC+2 (CEST)
- Postal code: 6200 Aabenraa
- Website: www.aabenraa.dk

Varnæs (German: Warnitz) is a town on Sundeved peninsula in Aabenraa Municipality, Region of Southern Denmark, with a population of 408 as of 1 January, 2026. The town lies 2 km north of Bovrup, 7 km northeast of Felsted, 14 km north of Gråsten, and 12 km east of Aabenraa. From 1970 to 2006, Varnæs was a part of Lundtoft Municipality.

Varnæs lies within Varnæs Parish. Varnæs Church is located at the southern end of the town, facing towards Bovrup, which also belongs to Varnæs Parish.

== History ==
The port at Varnæs was, for several years, an important shipping site. Skovsøen, 3 km northeast of the town, acted as a natural harbor. In 1231, when Varnæs was a crown dependency, income from the port was mentioned. Varnæs was also mentioned in the Danish Census Book.

=== Varnæs Birk ===
The Varnæs Birk had its own birk judge, and was thus an independent jurisdiction until 1769, when the district bailiff also became the birk judge. Trials took place in the open air on a square in the middle of the city. 1 km northwest of the city is Galgebjerg, where executions took place. Petty criminals were tied to one of the two neck irons on the church's belfry, where they could be mocked.

=== Aabenraa County Railways ===
Varnæs got a railway stop (German: Haltstelle) with sidings on the Aabenraa County Railway's Aabenraa-Gråsten line (1899-1926). The railway stop was located at the inn east of Varnæsvigvej on the current Varnæsvej, which is partially built on the track's route.

=== Reunion Stone ===
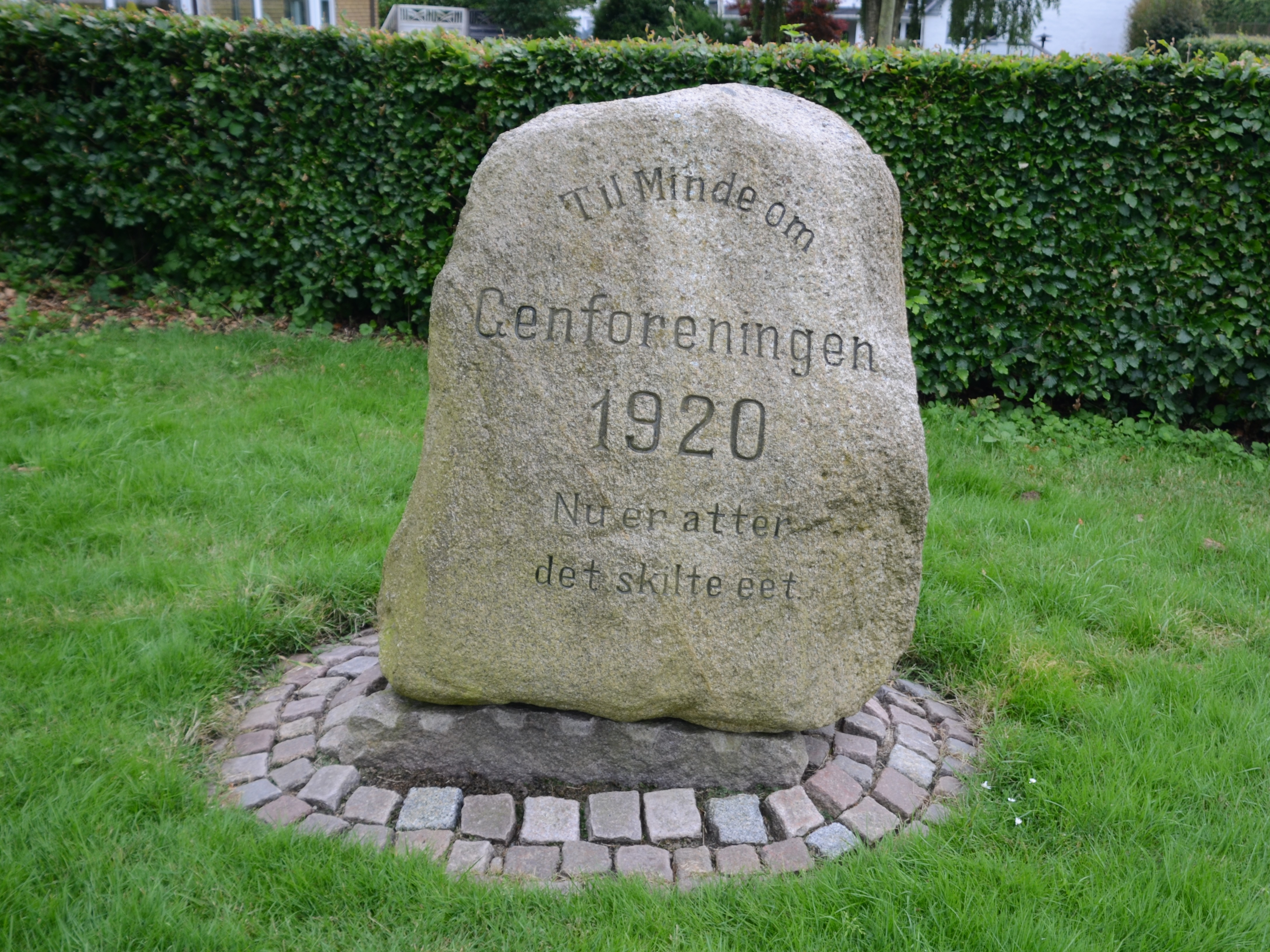
The Reunion Stone in Varnæs

Where Smedegade ends at Varnæsvigvej, there is a stone that was erected on Constitution Day in 1930 in memory of the 1920 Schleswig Plebiscites.

== Notable people ==
- Bertel Christian Ægidius (1673-1733), priest and hymnwriter who published the Varnæs-hymnal in 1717.
