= Jennifer Russell (translator) =

Danish translator

Jennifer Russell is a translator of fiction and poetry by Danish writers. She lives in Copenhagen. She usually co-works with Sophia Hersi Smith.

== Awards ==
- 2019: Gulf Coast Prize in Translation for the short story “Birdland” by Ursula Scavenius
- 2020: The American-Scandinavian Foundation Translation Prize for All the Birds in the Sky [Alle himlens fugle] by Rakel Haslund-Gjerrild, co-translated with Hersi Smith
- 2025: (with Hersi Smith) shortlisted for the National Book Award for Translated Literature for On the Calculation of Volume III
- 2026: Locus Award for Best Translated Novel (together with Hersi Smith) for On the Calculation of Volume III by Solvej Balle

== Exterlal links ==
- Official website
- Interview with translator Jennifer Russell: ‘Different languages open up different things in the mind’, interview about the translation of Marble by Amalie Smith
