= Graceful Friends =

2020 South Korean television series

- Promotional poster
- Hangul: 우아한 친구들
- RR: Uahan chingudeul
- MR: Uahan ch'in'gudŭl
- Genre: Drama; Mystery
- Created by: JTBC
- Written by: Park Hyo-yeon; Kim Gyeong-seon
- Directed by: Song Hyun-wook
- Starring: Yoo Jun-sang; Song Yoon-ah; Bae Soo-bin; Han Eun-jung; Kim Sung-oh; Kim Hye-eun; Jung Suk-yong; Lee In-hye; Kim Won-hae; Kim Ji-young
- Music by: Um Ki-yeop
- Country of origin: South Korea
- Original language: Korean
- No. of episodes: 17

Production
- Executive producer: Ham Young-hoon
- Producers: Park Woo-ram; Kim Sang-ho; Moon Hyung-seop; Lee Jeong-yeon; Kang Yu-ri; Na Yong-hoon
- Running time: 70 minutes
- Production companies: Studio&NEW; JCN; JTBC Studios

Original release
- Network: JTBC
- Release: July 10 – September 5, 2020

Graceful Friends (Korean: 우아한 친구들; RR: Uahan chingudeul) is a South Korean television series starring Yoo Jun-sang, Song Yoon-ah, Bae Soo-bin, Han Eun-jung, Kim Sung-oh, Kim Hye-eun, Jung Suk-yong, Lee In-hye, Kim Won-hae and Kim Ji-young. It aired on JTBC from July 10 to September 5, 2020. It's available for streaming on Netflix and Disney+ in selected countries.

== Synopsis ==
The peaceful life btw a group of friends who've known each other for 2 decades is suddenly blown up when a murder takes place.

Ahn Goong-chul (Yoo Jun-sang) has a seemingly perfect life with his beautiful wife and son. He works diligently for a food franchise company and is a loving husband and father to his family. Goong-chul's wife, Nam Jung-hae (Song Yoon-ah) is a psychiatrist who works in a family hospital. She is intelligent and beautiful but hides a dark past from her husband. Jung-hae gets entangled in a blackmailing scheme.

Jung Jae-hoon (Bae Soo-bin) is a divorced urologist with a wealthy family background. He lives alone and seems to have a mysterious side. He has a past connection to Nam Jung-hae, of which Ahn Goong-chul is ignorant.

Jo Hyung-woo (Kim Sung-oh) is an adult film director who is often mockingly called the "Bong Joon-ho" of the adult film industry. His dream is to become a mainstream big budget film director but he has never had any luck in achieving his goal. He is married to Kang Kyung-ja (Kim Hye-eun) who is a former adult film actress and now runs a luxury bar. He is very dependent on his wife's income. Kang Kyung-ja has a pro-golfer son named Kang Ji-wook.

Park Choon-bok (Jung Suk-yong) is an insurance company worker and part-time worker at a foreign car dealership. His wife Yoo Eun-sil (Lee In-hye) is a housewife and they have a daughter named Park Pu-reum. He looks comparatively older than his friends and wife, and people often mistakenly think he is his daughter's grandfather. He struggles financially but his wife is very supportive.

Cheon Man-shik (Kim Won-hae) is a City Hall Tax Collection Division official with a wife and a teenage daughter. He is quiet and polite and has depression. He and Ahn Goong-chul were roommates in college and consider each other best friends. He has been hiding a secret from his family and friends which is revealed only after his death.

Baek Hae-sook (Han Eun-jung) used to be friends with the five and they all used to have a crush on her in college. For some reason, she had to drop out of college and wasn't in touch with any of them until Man-shik's funeral. She buys a restaurant near the housing society where the five friends live, and seems to have a mysterious agenda.

== Cast ==
=== Main ===
- Yoo Jun-sang as Ahn Goong-chul
  - Kwon Hyuk as young Ahn Goong-chul
- Song Yoon-ah as Nam Jung-hae
  - Joo Da-young as young Nam Jung-hae
- Bae Soo-bin as Jung Jae-hoon
  - Han Min as young Jung Jae-hoon
- Han Eun-jung as Baek Hae-sook
  - Choi Soo-jung as young Baek Hae-sook
- Kim Sung-oh as Jo Hyung-woo
  - Choi Dae-han as young Jo Hyung-woo
- Kim Hye-eun as Kang Kyung-ja
- Jung Suk-yong as Park Choon-bok
- Lee In-hye as Yoo Eun-sil
- Kim Won-hae as Cheon Man-shik
  - Park Sung-joon as young Cheon Man-shik
- Kim Ji-young as Ji Myung-sook

=== Supporting ===
- Lee Tae-hwan as Joo Kang-san

A professional golf instructor who cons people to extract money for his gambling addiction.

- Kim Ji-sung as Na Ae-ra / Kang Mi-ra

An adult film actress who is blackmailed by Joo Kang-san to help him scam people.

- Yeon Je-hyung as Kang Ji-wook

Kang Kyung-ja's son and Jo Hyung-woo's stepson, he is a pro golfer. Like his stepfather, he also was Kang-san's blackmail victim.

- Kim Ji-young as Cheon Soo-ah

Man-shik and Myung-sook's teenage daughter who studies in Canada.

- Park Ha-joon as Ahn Yoo-bin

Goong-chul and Jung-hae's son.

- Shim Hye-yeon as Park Pu-reum

Choon-bok and Eun-sil's daughter, she has an innocent crush on Ahn Yoo-bin.

- Kim Seung-wook as Jo Tae-wook

Detective working on the murder case who also were in charge of Professor Park's murder case.

- Kim Hee-ryung as Goo Young-sun

An Alzheimer patient whom Man-sik took care of. She is married to Professor Park Do-hoon.

- Sa Kang as Do Do-hae

She is the caregiver of Goo Young-sun and liked Cheon Man-shik.

- Lee Yeon-doo as Choi Mo-ran

Jung Jae-hoon's ex-wife. She moved to America after their divorce and returned with a changed appearance.

=== Others ===
- Lee Joo-suk as Professor Han Eung-shik
- Jang Hee-soo as Oh Soon-jung, chairwoman of the hospital Nam Jung-hae works in.
- Kim Ga-hwa as Geum Ha-na, Jung Jae-hoon's colleague.
- Um Chae-young as Moon Ga-yeon, Ahn Yoo-bin's friend.
- Kim Dong-ho as Seo Joo-won, Joo Kang-san's friend.
- Kim Tae-young as Professor Park Do-hoon
- Sung Byung-sook as Ahn Goong-chul's mother.
- Kwon Hyuk as Ahn Goong-cheol
- Jeon Eun-mi
- Yoo Gun
- Kang Nam-gil
- Lee Geung-young
- Kim Jun-hyun as himself, Goong-chul's friend and brand ambassador of the chicken franchise where he works.

== Production ==
On January 18, 2020, it was reported that JTBC picked up the series which had already wrapped up filming.

== Viewership ==
Graceful Friends : South Korea viewers per episode (thousands)

Season	Episode number																	Average
Season	1	2	3	4	5	6	7	8	9	10	11	12	13	14	15	16	17	Average
1	702	596	876	812	844	930	826	926	859	1005	737	894	771	1005	989	942	1037	868

Source: Audience measurement performed nationwide by Nielsen Korea.

Average TV viewership ratings
Ep.	Original broadcast date	Title	Average audience share (Nielsen Korea)	
Ep.	Original broadcast date	Title	Nationwide	Seoul
1	July 10, 2020	Confession	3.197%	4.061%
2	July 11, 2020	That Woman	2.685%	3.299%
3	July 17, 2020	Inappropriate Relationship	4.126%	5.176%
4	July 18, 2020	A Secret More Horrifying Than Death	3.732%	4.316%
5	July 24, 2020	Confessions	4.553%	5.417%
6	July 25, 2020	Lie	4.429%	5.192%
7	July 31, 2020	First Love	4.320%	4.904%
8	August 1, 2020	The Beginning of a Crack	4.333%	4.872%
9	August 7, 2020	Pandora's Box	4.441%	4.959%
10	August 8, 2020	After The Play Is Over	4.711%	5.549%
11	August 14, 2020	Perfect Strangers	4.005%	5.060%
12	August 15, 2020	Truth Behind the Incident 1	4.454%	5.328%
13	August 21, 2020	Things You Cannot Undo	3.953%	5.358%
14	August 22, 2020	The Man Who Knelt	4.737%	5.578%
15	August 29, 2020	A Dramatic Twist	4.865%	5.834%
16	September 4, 2020	In The Mood For Love - Most Brilliant Times	4.785%	5.898%
17	September 5, 2020	The Truth Behind The Case 2	5.081%	6.388%
Average			4.259%	5.129%
In the table above, the blue numbers represent the lowest ratings and the red numbers represent the highest ratings.; This drama aired on a cable channel/pay TV which normally has a relatively smaller audience compared to free-to-air TV/public broadcasters (KBS, SBS, MBC and EBS).

== International broadcast ==
The series is available on iQIYI with multi-language subtitles in South East Asia and Taiwan.

The series is also being aired on K-Plus beginning February 27, 2021.

It is available to stream on Netflix and Disney+ in selected markets.
