= Kwon Hyuk (actor) =

South Korean actor

- Born: Kwon Hyuk; February 19, 1989 (age 37); South Korea
- Other name: Kwon Hyeok
- Occupations: Actor; model
- Years active: 2018–present
- Agent(s): Studio & New

Korean name
- Hangul: 권혁
- Hanja: 權赫
- RR: Gwon Hyeok
- MR: Kwŏn Hyŏk

Kwon Hyuk is a South Korean actor and model. He is known for his roles in dramas such as Top Star U-back, Graceful Friends and A Good Supper. He also appeared in the movie The Point Men.

== Early life ==
He was born on February 19, 1989, in South Korea.

== Career ==
In 2018 he joined Studio & News, he first did modeling for various promotional videos of Hyundai Sonata N Line, Samsung QLED, Samsung Fire & Marine Insurance, Korea Centers for Disease Control and Prevention, SMEG Brand Film and KDB Development Bank, KT Membership Shopping Discount, KT Galaxy Note 9, HUG Housing City Fund. The very same year he made his debut as an actor in drama Top Star U-back and appeared in music video "Winter-Somebody's tale". In 2020 he appeared in drama Graceful Friends also starring in the movie The Point Men. In 2021, he landed his first main role in a television series in the MBC drama A Good Supper, appearing alongside Jae Hee, Jung Woo-yeon and Kang Da-hyun.

== Filmography ==
=== Film ===
Year	Title	Role	Ref.
2023	The Point Men	Secretary	
2023	The Hotel	Seung-hoon	
2023	The New Employee	Kim Jon-chan	

=== Television series ===
Year	Title	Role	Notes	Ref.
2018	Top Star U-back	Min-hyeok		
2020	Graceful Friends	Ahn Goong-cheol (young)		
2021	A Good Supper	Park Jung-hoon		
2022	O'PENing – The Apartment Is Beautiful	Ha Young-suk	one act-drama; Season 5	
2022	Missing: The Other Side	Lee Tae-hyun	Season 2	
2022	Fanletter, Please!	Actor	Season 1	
2024	The Tyrant	Crocodile 2		
2024	Sorry Not Sorry	Seok Jin-ho		
2024	The Impossible Heir	In-ju's assistant		
2024	Love in the Big City	Nam-gyu		
2026	Bloody Flower	An Jung-Kil		
2026	In Your Radiant Season	Yeon Tae-seok		

=== Web series ===
Year	Title	Role	Ref.
2022	The New Employee	Jong Chan	

=== Music video appearances ===
Year	Title	Artist	Ref.
2018	"Winter-Somebody's tale"	Seong-soo	

== Awards and nominations ==
Award ceremony	Year	Category	Nominee / Work	Result	Ref.
MBC Drama Awards	2021	Excellence Award, Actor in a Short Drama	A Good Supper	Nominated	
