= Park Seolyeon =

South Korean writer (born 1989)

Park Seolyeon (Korean: 박서련; born 1989) is a South Korean writer. She made her debut with the short story "Mikimauseu keulleob" (미키마우스 클럽; lit. 'The Mickey Mouse Club').

Park Seolyeon was born in Cheorwon, South Korea, and she lives in Seoul.

Her novel Chegongnyeo gangjuryong (체공녀 강주룡; lit. Kang Juryong, the Woman in the Air), officially translated by Anton Hur as Capitalists Must Starve, is based on the life of Kang Juryong, a female worker who led a strike at the Pyongwon rubber factory in Japan-occupied Pyongyang in 1931, climbing the roof of Ulmil Pavilion to protest working conditions.

== Works ==
- 2015: “Mikimauseu keulleob” (미키마우스 클럽; lit. "The Mickey Mouse Club"), short story
- 2018: Chegongnyeo gangjuryong (체공녀 강주룡; lit. Kang Juryong, the Woman in the Air), novel
  - 2020: Japanese translation, 滞空女 屋根の上のモダンガール
  - 2025: English translation, Capitalists Must Starve (translated by Anton Hur, ISBN 978-1-917126-21-2)
- 2019: Mareutaui il (마르타의 일; lit. Martha's Job), novel
- 2020: Deo syeolli keulleob (더 셜리 클럽; lit. The Shirley Club), novel
- 2021: Horeumoni geulaesseo (호르몬이 그랬어; lit. My Hormones Made Me Do It), short story collection
- 2022: Dangshin eommaga dangshinboda jalhaneun geim (당신 엄마가 당신보다 잘하는 게임; lit. Your Mom's the Better Player), short story collection
- 2023: Na, na, Madeullen (나, 나, 마들렌; lit. Me, Me, Madeline), short story collection
- 2022: Mabeobsonyeo euntoihabnada (마법소녀 은퇴합니다; lit. Magical Girl Ready to Retire), novel
  - 2024: English translation, A Magical Girl Retires (translated by Anton Hur, ISBN 9780063373266)
- 2024: Mabeobsonyeo bokjikhabnida (마법소녀 복직합니다; lit. A Magical Girl Rehired), novel
  - 2026: English translation, A Magical Girl Rehired, (translated by Anton Hur, ISBN 9780063475960)
- 2023: Peurojekteu beui (프로젝트 브이; lit. Project V), novel
  - 2026: English translation, Project V (translated by Gene Png, ISBN 978-0-06-342978-9)

== Awards ==
- 2015: Silcheon Munhak New Writer’s Award for "The Mickey Mouse Club"
- 2018: The Hankyoreh Literature Award for Kang Juryong, the Woman in the Air
- 2021: Munhakdongne Young Writers Award
- 2023: Yi Sang Literary Award
