= Locus Award for Best Translated Novel =

Literary award by Locus magazine

The Locus Award for Best Translated Novel is one of the annual Locus Awards presented by the science fiction and fantasy magazine Locus. Awards presented in a given year are for works published in the previous calendar year. The Locus Awards have been described as a prestigious prize in science fiction, fantasy and horror literature.

This award was first given out in 2026 for the year of 2025.

== Winners and finalists ==
* Winner

Year	Novel	Author	Translator(s)	Ref.
2026	On the Calculation of Volume III*	Solvej Balle	Sophia Hersi Smith	
2026	On the Calculation of Volume III*	Solvej Balle	Jennifer Russell	
2026	The Unworthy	Agustina Bazterrica	Sarah Moses	
2026	The Midnight Shift	Cheon Seon-Ran	Gene Png	
2026	Red Sword	Bora Chung	Anton Hur	
2026	The Midnight Timetable	Bora Chung	Anton Hur	
2026	Ice	Jacek Dukaj	Ursula Phillips	
2026	Blood for the Undying Throne	Sung-il Kim	Anton Hur	
2026	Vanishing World	Sayaka Murata	Ginny Tapley Takemori	
2026	Dengue Boy	Michel Nieva	Rahul Bery	
2026	The Wax Child	Olga Ravn	Martin Aitken	
