= Blood of the Old Kings =

2016 fantasy novel by Sung-il Kim

- Cover art for the English-language version of the novel, published by Tor Books
- Author: Sung-il Kim
- Original title: 메르시아의 별
- Translator: Anton Hur
- Language: Korean
- Genre: Fantasy
- Publisher: Onuju (Korean); Tor Books (English)
- Publication date: 2016
- Publication place: South Korea
- English publication date: October 2024
- Pages: 358 (English hardcover version)
- ISBN: 9781250895332

Blood of the Old Kings (Korean: 메르시아의 별, Star of Mercia) is a 2016 fantasy novel by Sung-il Kim. It was translated into English by Anton Hur and published by Tor Books in 2024. The novel follows three different characters as they attempt to defeat the forces of a corrupt empire powered by necromancy.

== Synopsis ==
=== Premise ===
The Empire retains its control over the continent through the use of necromancy. When a sorcerer dies, the corpse is placed in a magical coffin and turned into a power generator, allowing the use of the sorcerer’s magic even after death. The Empire has either destroyed or conquered many other territories on the continent. Using an arcane weapon known as the Star of Mersia, the Empire destroyed the nation of Mersia and only wasteland remains. The territories of Arland and Kamori have been colonized, and their previous kings have been killed. The dragon which was once ridden by the king of Arland has been defeated and imprisoned by the Empire.

=== Plot summary ===
An Arlander woman named Loran seeks revenge against the Empire for the deaths of her husband and daughter. She pledges to become the King of Arland and liberate her country. The dragon that was once ridden by the previous king of Arland gives her a sword made from one of its fangs. Loran joins with Prince Emere and King Gwaharad, men who hope to restore the royal line of Kamori. Together, they capture a Power generator from an imperial legion.

Cain is an Arlander living in the imperial Capital. His friend Fienna is murdered. Cain investigated Gladdis, a Kamori merchant who may have had a hand in Fienna’s death. He is apprehended by the Imperial Ministry of Intelligence. Agent Septima asks Cain to investigate Gladdis, who was paying Fienna.

Arienne studies sorcery at the Imperial Academy. She was taken to the Academy at age 10 after her magic was discovered. Arienne fears being turned into a Power generator after her death and longs for escape. Arienne is contacted by the ghost of the sorcerer Eldred. Eldred helps her to steal the Power generator fashioned from his corpse, and she escapes. Cain meets Arienne and agrees to help her escape due to their shared Arlander heritage.

Meanwhile, the Empire sends troops to Arland as revenge for Loran’s attack on the legionaries. Emere’s Kamori fighters accompany Loran to defend the city of Kingsworth. Loran defeats the Imperial troops there. Gwaharad tries to negotiate with the Imperial prefect, but Loran kills him. The cowardly Gwaharad asks Loran to surrender herself to appease the Empire; she agrees. As she journeys to the nearest Imperial fort, an army of peasants follows her. Instead of surrendering, she decides to attack the fortress.

Cain follows Gladdis’s agent Safani; he finds the missing Power generator, which was transferred back to the capital by Gwaharad. Gladdis plans to use the generator as a bomb to destroy the Capital. She had Fienna killed for refusing to join her. Gladdis and her allies attempt to drown Cain and dispose of his body, but he overpowers her and drags her into the water instead. Safani begins his attack on the Senate building. Cain confronts and kills Safani. He has the opportunity to take control of the Empire’s Power generators and become a king, but declines.

As she escapes, Arienne is pursued by Grand Inquisitor Lysandros, an old enemy of Eldred. Arienne uses sorcery to injure Eldred and kill Lysandros. She takes control of a Power generator made from the corpse of Tychon, the infant son of Lisandro’s. Emere escorts Arienne to meet Loran. Loran asks Arienne to free the dragon for the upcoming conflict.

Eldred helps Arienne break the dragon’s chains. He betrays her and possesses the dragon’s body, planning to use it to become a great king. Arienne defeats Eldred and free the dragon at the price of many of her memories of her own past. With her Kamori allies and the dragon, Loran defeats the Empire. She and the dragon disappear. Arland gains greater independence, but the future of the territory remains uncertain. Arienne plans to raise the spirit of Tychon in secret, preventing him from being used for his Power. The novel ends as Loran returns to speak to Arienne.

== Publication history ==
When Blood of the Old Kings was first published in South Korea, Kim was only able to release the first volume in a planned trilogy. In 2025, the second volume, Blood for the Undying Throne was released by Tor Books.

== Reception ==
Matthew Galloway of Library Journal wrote that readers will "crave further works from Kim after reading his English-language debut," comparing the book positively to works by Robert Jackson Bennett, Shannon Chakraborty, and Naomi Novik. Chris Kluwe of Lightspeed praised the way in which Kim is able to combine "a broad array of early-Asian mysticism and culture" and "heavy Roman Republic vibes" to create the society of the novel. Kluwe praised the novel's themes, which include "rebellion and unrest" as well as "the burden of power and the costs of wielding it." Publishers Weekly praised the way in which Kim avoided the "chosen one" narrative with his three protagonists, focusing on "actions rather than inheritance."

Alex Brown of Reactor praised the lack of a romance subplot, writing that "Romance is pretty much part and parcel of fantasy nowadays in Western fiction... it was a nice treat to get through an entire fantasy book where no one hits on anyone else." Brown noted that several plot elements, dubbed "take on the empire" fantasy, felt typical of the genre. Brown stated "the bones of its plot and the character arcs I’ve seen before," but felt that the unique ending "twisted the familiar into something much more compelling, and it did a great job setting up the rest of the series." Sean Dowie of Locus praised the propulsive action sequences and the "innovative, engaging" magic system. Dowie felt that Cain was the weakest of the three major characters and wished for more complex characterization and worldbuilding, stating that "It’s not a heady book, and it shouldn’t be, but I would’ve loved a little more dimensionality."
