= Michel Nieva =

Argentine writer

Michel Nieva (born 1988) is an Argentine writer. He was born in Buenos Aires and studied philosophy at the University of Buenos Aires. His prose work often deals with science fiction, speculative genres, and the Argentine historical and literary tradition, a blend dubbed gaucho-punk. He is also a teacher and translator.

In 2021, Nieva was named by Granta magazine as one of the best young writers in the Spanish language. His short story "Niño Dengue" ("Dengue Boy") published on that magazine, won the O. Henry Award in 2022; the following year, it was further developed into the novel La infancia del mundo, translated as Dengue Boy in 2025, which was nominated for the 2026 Locus Award for Best Translated Novel.

== Works ==
- 2011: Papelera de reciclaje, poetry collection
- 2013: ¿Sueñan los gauchoides con ñandúes eléctricos? [Do Gauchoids Dream of Electric Rheas?], a novel; a hint to Do Androids Dream of Electric Sheep?
  - 2018: In Bulgarian:Сънят на Гаучоида
- 2018: Ascenso y apogeo del imperio argentino
- 2020: Tecnología y barbarie, collection of 8 essays, ISBN 8433922130
- 2024: Ciencia ficción capitalista: Cómo los multimillonarios nos salvarán del fin del mundo, book-size essay, ISBN 8433922149
  - 2026: In English: Technology and Barbarism or: How Billionaires Will Save Us from the End of the World. Astra (US). English translation of Ciencia ficción capitalista and Tecnología y barbarie by Rahul Bery and Daniel Hahn
- 2022: "Niño Dengue", short story
- 2023: La infancia del mundo, novel
  - 2025: In English: Dengue Boy. Astra (US). Strange Light (Canada). Serpent's Tail (UK). Novel. English translation by Rahul Bery.
