= Sung-il Kim =

South Korean speculative fiction writer

Sung-il Kim (Korean: 김성일, born 1974) is a South Korean writer of science fiction, fantasy, and horror. He was born in Seoul.

He is writing since 2016.

== Works ==
- I Will Go to Earth to See You
- Wolf Hunt
- "The Knight of La Mancha", short story

=== Bleeding Empire Series ===
- Blood of the Old Kings (Originally published in 2016 as 메르시아의 별, or Star of Mercia, serialized online in 2017 and translated in 2024)
  Russian translation: Кровь Древних Королей by Yelena Dibrova, Moscow, Eksmo, ISBN 978-5-04-216062-2 (2026)
- Blood for the Undying Throne (2025; original title: 메르시아의 마법사, The Wisard of Mercia, serialized online in 2017)
- Blood to the True Crown (2026; original title: 메르시아의 그림자, The Shadow of Mercia)

== Awards and recognition ==
- 2018: "The Knight of La Mancha": Excellence Award at the Korean SF Awards
- 2024: Wolf Hunt, Grand Prize at the Korean SF Awards
- 2026: Blood for the Undying Throne, translation by Anton Hur, was shortlisted for the Locus Award for Best Translated Novel
