= Jin Ho-eun =

South Korean actor (born 2000)

- Born: September 1, 2000 (age 26); South Korea
- Education: Hanlim Arts School
- Occupation: Actor
- Years active: 2018–present
- Agent: Outer Korea

Korean name
- Hangul: 진호은
- RR: Jin Hoeun
- MR: Chin Hoŭn

Jin Ho-eun (Korean: 진호은; September 1, 2000) is a South Korean actor. He is known for his roles in dramas such as Beautiful Love, Wonderful Life, The Secret of Secret, To My Beautiful Woo Ri, All of Us Are Dead and Revenge of Others.

== Filmography ==
Key
†	Denotes films that have not yet been released

=== Film ===
Year	Title	Role	Ref.
2019	A Resistance	South prisoner	
2020	Dumbheaded Duo	Nam Gil-hoon	
2020	Kkangchi 2	Joon-soo	

=== Television series ===
Year	Title	Role	Notes	Ref.
2019	Beautiful Love, Wonderful Life	Goo Joon-gyeom	Cameo (episodes 1–4)	
2021	Nevertheless	Seo Ji-wan's friend		
2022	All of Us Are Dead	Jung Min-jae		
2022	Shooting Stars	Byun Jung-yeol		
2022	Revenge of Others	Sa Jung-kyung		
2022	JTBC Drama Festa – Love of the Essay Kid	Park Hyung-do	one act-drama	
2022–2023	Recipe for Farewell	Kang Jae-ho	TVING Original Series	
2023	Maestra: Strings of Truth	Kim Bong-ju		
2024	Love in the Big City	Gyu-ho		
2025	Nice to Not Meet You	Wi Hong-shin		
2025	KBS Drama Special – Love : Track: Minji Minji Minji	Yun Min-ji		
2026	Unfriend †	Jun-su		

=== Web series ===
Year	Title	Role	Notes	Ref.
2018	Go, Back Diary	Choi Min-hwan		
2018	Your Imagination Becomes Reality	Honh Jun-ki		
2019	To My Beautiful Woo Ri	Woo-ri's ex-boyfriend		
2019	The Secret of Secret	Seo Jae-min	Produced by the Korean National Human Rights Commission.	
2020	Twenty-Twenty	Kang Dae-geun		
2021	Re-Feel: If Only	Kang Dae-geun	Special appearance	

=== Music video appearances ===
Year	Song Title	Artist	Ref.
2021	"With me" (나랑)	NUOL (뉴올) (Feat. Sound Kim(사운드킴), Boi B)	
