= Kim Hyun (actress) =

South Korean actress (born 1971)

- Born: Kim Hyun-ok; 27 March 1971 (age 55); South Korea
- Other names: Kim Hyeon-ok, Kim Hyeon
- Education: Sejong University Graduate School of Convergence Arts (Major in Acting)
- Occupation: Actress
- Years active: 1992–present
- Agent: Fantagio
- Known for: Top Star U-back; The Great Show; Sweet Home

Kim Hyun is a South Korean actress. She is known for her roles in dramas such as Top Star U-back, The Great Show, Link: Eat, Love, Kill, and Sweet Home. She has also appeared in such movies as The Chase, Gangnam Blues, and Insane.

== Filmography ==
=== Television ===
List of television appearances, with year, title, and role shown
Year	Title	Role	Ref.
2012	Faith	Ji-ok's criminal	
2013	The Sandal	Go Joo-ran's aide	
2014	Drama Festival: "Old Farewell"	Chae-hee's mother	
2014	Secret Door	Jang Hwa-won	
2015	Splendid Politics	Inspection court lady	
2016	KBS Drama Special: "Dance from Afar"	Lee Seul-gi's mother	
2016	Five Enough	Helper	
2016	Babysitter	Mi-yeong's friend	
2016	Becky's Back	Next-door middle-aged woman	
2016	Secrets of Women	Caretaker	
2016	Blow Breeze	Soon-boon	
2016	The K2	Guide	
2016	Voice	Im Mi-ho	
2018	Ms. Hammurabi	Park Cha-oh Reum's aunt	
2018	Mr. Sunshine	Apothecary	
2018	Top Star U-back	Yang Bang-shil	
2019	The Great Show	Yang Mi-sook	
2020	Soul Mechanic	Patient	
2020	Sweet Home	Ahn Seon-young	
2021	Youth of May	Aunt	
2021	Hospital Playlist	Choi Eun-suk	
2021	Hellbound	Church member	
2022	Link: Eat, Love, Kill	Jo Jae-suk	
2022	Through the Darkness	Hwa-yeon's mother	
2022	Reborn Rich	Lee Pil-ok	
2022	Weak Hero Class 1	School principal	
2023	The Escape of the Seven	Ji-sook	
2023	The Story of Park's Marriage Contract	Court Lady Cho	
2024	Marry My Husband	Lee Myung-ja	
2024	The Escape of the Seven	Yoon Ji-sook	
2024	Cinderella Game	Seok-gi's mother	

=== Film ===
List of film appearances, with year, title, and role shown
Year	Title	Role	Ref.
2007	Mi Ja's Beauty Parlor	Kim Mi-ja	
2009	The Room Nearby	Hye-min's mother	
2010	River of Murder	Umbrella lady	
2012	The Beginning of Misfortune	Mistress	
2014	Broken	Cheol-yong's mother	
2014	Cart	Cashier	
2015	Gangnam Blues	Banquet hall waltz team	
2016	Pure Love	Woman	
2016	Insane	Patient's family member	
2017	House of the Disappeared	Previous house owner	
2017	The Chase	Factory woman	
2018	Taklamakan	Karaoke owner	
2018	Seven Years of Night	Woman who lost her husband	
2018	The Soup	Landlady	
2018	The Spy Gone North	Real estate office owner	
2019	Tune in for Love	Kim Hyun-sook	
2020	Gone with the Wind	Seo-min	
2020	Tiny Light	Kwak-hyun	
2020	Somewhere in Between	Aunt Beom-hee	
2020	Secret Zoo	Dismissed employee	
2020	Somewhere in Between – Director's Cut	Aunt Beom-hee	
2025	Teaching Practice: Idiot Girls and School Ghost 2	Choi Suk-kyung	

== Awards and nominations ==
Name of the award ceremony, year presented, category, nominee of the award, and the result of the nomination
Award ceremony	Year	Category	Result	Ref.
Back Festival Acting Awards	2008	Best New Actress	Won	
New Year Literature Awards	2012	Best Actress	Won	
Korea Women's Theater Association Allbit Awards	2012	Rookie of the Year Award	Won	
14th Miryang Summer Performing Arts Festival Young Director's	2014	Best Actress	Won	
Seoul Theatre Festival Excellence Award	2024	Best Actress	Won	
