= Anton Hur =

South Korean writer (born 1981)

- 허정범
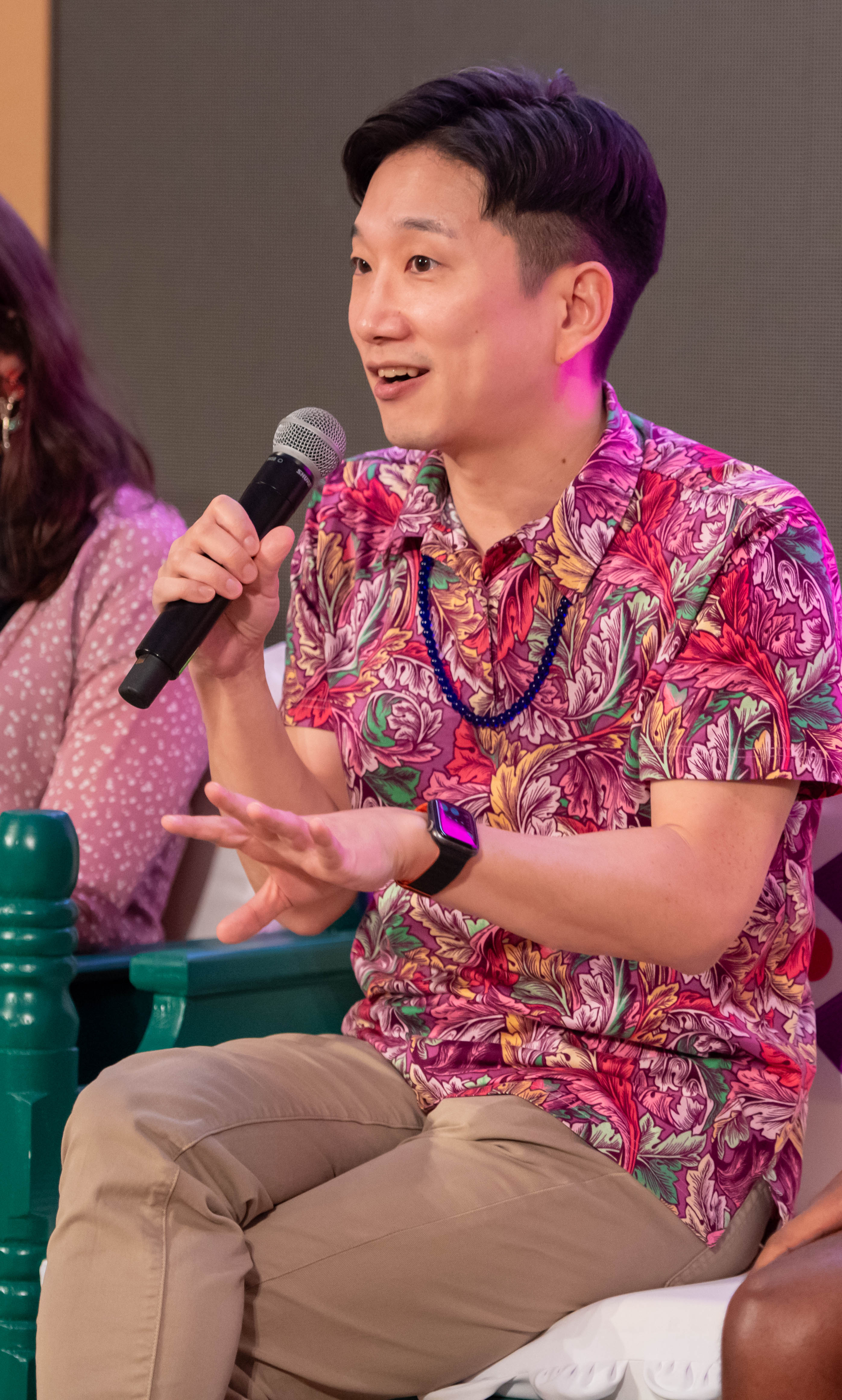
- Hur in 2024
- Born: April 7, 1981 (age 45); Stockholm, Sweden
- Citizenship: South Korea
- Occupations: Writer, translator
- Notable work: Cursed Bunny; Love in the Big City
- Website: antonhur.com

- Anton Hur
- Hangul: 허정범
- RR: Heo Jeongbeom
- MR: Hŏ Chŏngbŏm
- IPA: hʌdʑʌŋbʌm

Anton Hur (Korean: 허정범, or 안톤 허; born April 7, 1981) is a Korean writer and translator of Korean literature into English. He has translated the works of Shin Kyung-sook; Hwang Sok-yong; Sang Young Park, whose Love in the Big City was longlisted for the 2022 International Booker Prize; and Bora Chung, whose collection of short stories Cursed Bunny was shortlisted for the same prize. Hur was also the only translator that year to have been longlisted for two translations. Hur was awarded a PEN/Heim Translation Fund Grant for his translation of Cursed Bunny. Hur was awarded a PEN Translates grant to translate The Underground Village by Kang Kyeong-ae.

== Biography ==
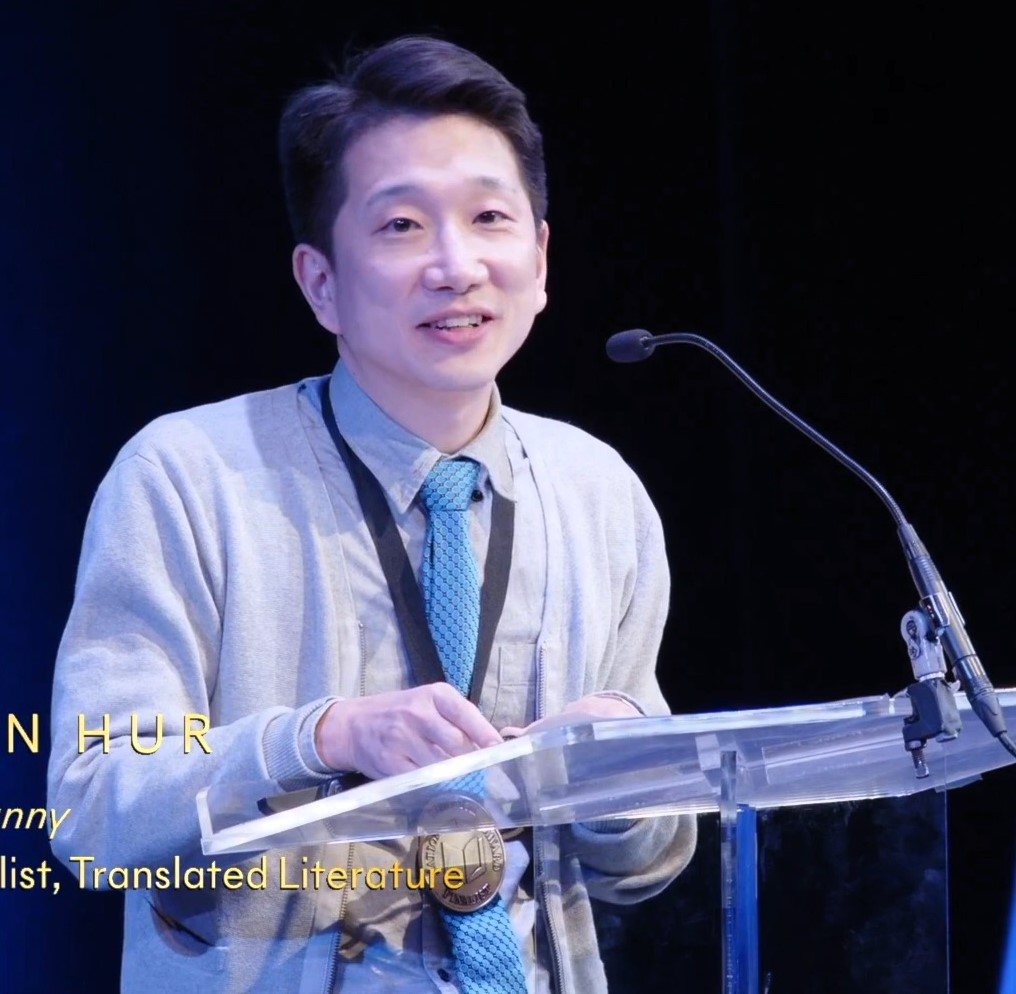
Hur at the National Book Awards in 2023

Hur, a South Korean citizen, was born in Stockholm on 7 April 1981. His father worked for KOTRA, a state-funded trade and investment promotion organization of the South Korean government, and he was raised in various places including Hong Kong, Ethiopia, and Thailand before settling in South Korea. As his family did not initially support him studying literature, he studied law and psychology at Korea University and French at Korea National Open University before pursuing a master's degree in English literature at Seoul National University. He began working as a translator full-time in 2018, beginning with Shin Kyung-Sook's The Court Dancer. He manages the literary translation group Smoking Tigers.

In addition to translating Korean literature into English, Hur is also the translator of the Korean edition of Ocean Vuong's Night Sky with Exit Wounds. His writing has been published in outlets such as Astra Magazine, Words Without Borders, Literary Hub, Asymptote, and others. In 2022, he was a recipient of the 13th Hong Jin-Ki Creator Award, which honours "Koreans who made crucial contributions to society, science and technology, as well as culture and arts".

Hur's first novel, Toward Eternity, was published by HarperVia in 2024. The book was named one of the five best science fiction books of 2024 by The Guardian.

In 2025, Hur was on the judging panel for the International Booker Prize. His translation of Park Seolyeon's Capitalists Must Starve released in October 2025.

The novels Red Sword and Midnight Timetable by Bora Chung, translated by Hur, were both finalists for the 2026 Locus Award for Best Translated Novel. The novel Blood for the Undying Throne by Sung-il Kim, translated by Hur, was also a finalist for the award.

== Personal life ==
Hur is openly queer and has written about sexuality, the history of diverse sexuality in Korean literature beginning with Yi Kwangsu's 1909 short story "Is It Love", and misery as an enduring theme in queer Korean literature. He and his husband divide their time between Seoul and Songdo. Hur uses he/they pronouns.

== Selected translations ==
- Kim, Sung-il (2016), Blood of the Old Kings, Tor Books, ISBN 9781250895332
- Kang, Kyeong-ae (2018), The Underground Village, Honford Star, ISBN 9781999791261
- Shin, Kyung-Sook (2018), The Court Dancer, New York: Pegasus Books, ISBN 9781643132525
- Park, Sang Young (2019), Love in the Big City, Grove, ISBN 9780802158789
- Chung, Bora (2021), Cursed Bunny, Honford Star, ISBN 9781916277182
- Hwang, Sok-yong (2021), The Prisoner, Verso, ISBN 9781839760839
- Baek, Sehee (2022), I Want to Die but I Want to Eat Tteokbokki, Bloomsbury, ISBN 9781635579383
- Shin, Kyung-Sook (2022), Violets, Feminist Press, ISBN 9781558612907
- Kang, Myeongseok (2023), Beyond the Story: 10-Year Record of BTS, Bighit Music / Flatiron Books, ISBN 9781035031542
- Lee, Seong-Bok (2023), Indeterminate Inflorescence, Sublunary Editions, ISBN 9781955190626
- Chung, Bora (2024), Your Utopia, Algonquin Books, ISBN 9781643756219
- Park Seolyeon (2025), Capitalists Must Starve, Tilted Axis Press, ISBN 9781917126212
- Chung, Bora (2025), Midnight Timetable, Algonquin Books, ISBN 9781668651681

== Works ==
- Hur, Anton (2024), Toward Eternity, HarperVia, ISBN 9780063344488
