= Bora Chung =

South Korean writer and translator (born 1976)

Chung Bora
- 정보라
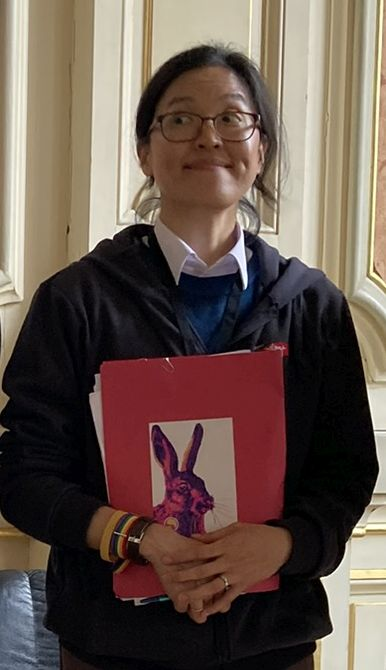
- Chung at the Quais du Polar, Lyon in 2023
- Born: 1976 (age 49–50); Seoul, South Korea
- Education: Yonsei University (BA); Yale University (MA); Indiana University Bloomington (PhD)
- Occupations: Author, activist
- Writing career
- Language: Korean
- Years active: 2008–present
- Genres: Horror; magical realism; science fiction

- Chung Bora
- Hangul: 정보라
- RR: Jeong Bora
- MR: Chŏng Pora

Chung Bora (Korean: 정보라; born 1976) is a South Korean writer and translator. Her collection of short stories, Cursed Bunny, was shortlisted for the 2022 International Booker Prize.

== Early life and education ==
Chung Bora was born in Seoul, South Korea. Her parents were dentists. She completed graduate studies in Russian and East European area studies at Yale University, then went on to gain a PhD in Slavic literature from Indiana University Bloomington. She taught the Russian language, literature, and science fiction studies at Yonsei University.

== Career ==
Chung has written three novels and three collections of short stories. She lists as her literary influences the works of Park Wan-suh, Bruno Schulz, Bruno Jasieński, Andrei Platonov and Lyudmila Petrushevskaya, as well as Samguk yusa folktales. In 1998, she won a Yonsei Literature Prize for her short story The Head. She is also a recipient of second prizes at the Digital Literature Awards (2008) and Gwacheon Science Center SF Awards (2014).

In 2022, the English edition of her short story collection Cursed Bunny translated by Anton Hur was shortlisted for the International Booker Prize. The ten stories borrow from different genres, including magical realism, horror and science fiction. In September 2023 the book was longlisted for the National Book Award for Translated Literature.

In January 2024, another short story collection of hers, Your Utopia, came out in English translation, as did the novella Grocery List from Hanuman Books in June 2024, both were translated by Anton Hur. Hur announced that Chung's third novel, Red Sword, will be published in English translation in 2025.

Her fourth novel, Midnight Timetable, was also translated into English by Hur, published in 2026. Midnight Timetable was shortlisted for the 2026 Ursula K. Le Guin Prize.

Red Sword and Midnight Timetable were both finalists for the 2026 Locus Award for Best Translated Novel.

Chung translates contemporary prose from Russian and Polish into Korean.

== Political views ==
Chung is a social activist, advocating for LGBTQ and women's rights. She has spoken out about the need for the inclusion of the themes of minority groups in modern science fiction.

Following Russia's invasion on Ukraine in 2022, Chung expressed her support for Ukraine and Poland for the support of Ukrainian refugees. During the Gaza war, Chung condemned Israel's action and expressed her support for Palestine; she also signed a letter calling for boycott of Israel.

Chung has criticised artificial intelligence, stating "From what I read, human beings really don't understand what we created, and artificial intelligence and deep learning, machine learning, all these things are structured so that the machine would accumulate experience and data and information and analyze them and draw conclusions more like human beings do. So that means our prejudices, our misconceptions, our own hate and misunderstanding and discrimination is part of the data human beings created. So technology is not impartial. Information is not neutral. And that is backfiring. And that will backfire. But probably engineers don't agree with me. So yeah, I'm afraid of machines."

== Bibliography ==
=== Novels ===
- The Door Opened. 2010.
- Dreams of the Dead. 2012.
- Red Sword. 2019.
- Midnight Timetable : A Novel in Ghost Stories. Translated by Anton Hur. Chapel Hill, NC: Algonquin Books. 2025.

=== Short fiction ===
Collections

- Seed. 2013.
- The King's Prostitute. 2013.
- Cursed Bunny. Translated by Anton Hur. Chapel Hill, NC: Algonquin Books. 2022. (Note: Briefly reviewed in the February 13&20, 2023 issue of The New Yorker, p.85.)
- Your Utopia. Translated by Anton Hur. Chapel Hill, NC: Algonquin Books. 2024.

———————

Bibliography notes
