= Love in the Big City (2024 film) =

2024 film by E.oni

- Theatrical release poster
- Hangul: 대도시의 사랑법
- Lit.: How to Love in the Big City
- RR: Daedosiui sarangbeop
- MR: Taedosiŭi sarangbŏp
- Directed by: E.oni
- Written by: Kim Na-deul
- Based on: Love in the Big City by Sang Young Park
- Produced by: Park Joon-sik; Kim Hye-sung
- Starring: Kim Go-eun; Noh Sang-hyun
- Cinematography: Kim Hyung-joo
- Edited by: Kim Sun-min; Lee Hyun-mi
- Music by: Primary
- Production companies: Showbox; Tale Farming; Megabox Plus M
- Distributed by: Megabox Plus M
- Release dates: September 13, 2024 (TIFF); October 1, 2024 (South Korea)
- Running time: 118 minutes
- Country: South Korea
- Language: Korean
- Box office: US$6.3 million

Love in the Big City (Korean: 대도시의 사랑법) is a 2024 South Korean comedy-drama film directed by E.oni, based on the novel of the same name by Sang Young Park, written by Kim Na-deul, and starring Kim Go-eun and Noh Sang-hyun. It revolves around two young adults — Jae-hee, a free spirit, and Heung-soo, a man who hides a deep secret — becoming best friends and roommates. They navigate their lives together, sharing both joys and hardships in Seoul.

The film is an adaptation of only the Jae-hee section from Love in the Big City, an interconnected collection of four short stories.

It premiered at the Toronto International Film Festival on September 13, 2024, and received a theatrical release in South Korea on October 1, 2024.

== Cast ==
- Kim Go-eun as Jae-hee
- Noh Sang-hyun as Heung-soo
- Jeong Whee as Su-ho
- Oh Dong-min as Ji-seok
- Jang Hye-jin as Myeong-sook, Heung-soo's mother
- Lee Sang-yi as Min-jun
- Kwak Dong-yeon as Jun-su
- Joo Jong-hyuk as tattooist
- Lee You-jin as Sun-woo
- Salim Benoit as Olivier

== Production ==
=== Development ===
A longtime book lover, director E.oni was introduced to the novel—a collection of four short stories—by a friend. She read it the year it was published, and wanted to adapt the story of Jae-hee into a film as she had been particularly drawn to the character, whose story she found to be deeply relatable. She went to propose the idea directly to the film production company, Whale and Organic.

She later met with the author, Sang Young Park, who secured the adaptation rights, and spent a year working on the screenplay. She went onto direct the film and was credited as the planner, screenwriter, and director. It took her five years to complete Love in the Big City.

=== Adaptation ===
The film is based on Jae-hee, the first story in Sang Young Park's interconnected short story collection Love in the Big City. Director E.oni decided to adapt only this story, expressing her desire to tell a story about the confusion of youth "before forgetting what it felt like to be young."

The director stated that developing the character of Jae-hee was one of the most difficult parts of the process. She constantly questioned how bold she could be and where to draw the line. At one point, when asked how she hoped Jae-hee would come across in the film, she immediately replied that she wanted her to be a character who is loved. E.oni said she genuinely liked the portrayal of Jae-hee in the original novel, which motivated her to search for a new story arc for the character in the film. She found Jae-hee, with her boldness and openness, to be admirable and even enviable—someone quite different from herself. Because the original story is told from Young's—here renamed Heung-soo— perspective, many aspects of Jae-hee remained hidden. E.oni wanted to fully explore the charm of the character and experience a sense of catharsis in the process. As a director who enjoys examining the dynamics between two characters, Jae-hee was exactly the kind of story she was drawn to.

Although the story could have been told from Jae-hee's perspective, the film—like the original—maintains Heung-soo's point of view. E.oni explained that this was a conscious choice to allow Jae-hee's subjective emotions and gaze to exist alongside his. As a result, Jae-hee becomes a character who, while constantly struggling and hurting, embraces the world, herself, and her friendship.

In adapting the short story into a feature-length film, the narrative and structure were expanded. Elements not present in the original—such as domestic violence or homophobic remarks in the workplace—were added. E.oni explained that the script was written by a team of five women, including herself, the screenwriter, and the producer. They drew on their own life experiences to shape the story, aiming to present situations that would resonate with audiences. She emphasized that these additions were not made to follow trends, but to reflect relatable realities.

The film also features a change in music. While the characters sing Fin.K.L's "Eternal Love" in the novel, this was replaced in the film with miss A's "Bad Girl, Good Girl." According to the director, the lyrics felt like a perfect match for the characters and even resembled a letter from Heung-soo to Jae-hee, prompting the change. Another difference involves the character Su-ho. In the novel, Su-ho appears to have taken his own life. However, in the film, his storyline diverges. E.oni explained that although Su-ho is depicted as someone with a privileged background who struggles with his identity, she couldn't accept the idea of his story ending in death. She questioned whether such an ending was necessary for the film and decided to portray a different path.

A new detail added in the film shows Heung-soo's mother, Myeong-sook, having gone to see Call Me by Your Name alone—conveyed visually through a ticket stub. While this action doesn't resolve the conflict between a mother and her gay son, the scene was included to suggest that Myeong-sook is at least trying to understand and make an effort.

Certain objects also take on symbolic meaning in the film. In the novel, Jae-hee briefly steals a model of a uterus from the OB-GYN clinic during her abortion but immediately returns it. In the film, she runs off with it and places it on her desk as a decorative object. The model continues to appear throughout the film and even becomes a tool of resistance in a key scene. This recurring prop serves as a cinematic device to further highlight Jae-hee's narrative.

=== Casting ===
Kim Go-eun, who plays Jae-hee, was an actress whom director E.oni had wanted to work with from the early stages of the screenplay. However, after Kim confirmed her casting, it took over a year to find a suitable co-star because of Heung-soo being a gay character, which made it challenging to find a suitable actor.

At one point, when E.oni feared the film might not move forward due to casting difficulties, she discovered actor Noh Sang-hyun through the drama series Pachinko. Initially, she had imagined someone with a softer, more rounded image for the role, but after watching Noh's performance, she changed her mind. She later recalled that on the day they first met, she even followed him to the restroom to express how strongly she wanted him in the role.

Noh stated that it was the script that convinced him to join the project. He described it as honest and understated, with realistic dialogue and compelling characters. In particular, he was drawn to the growth and relationship between Jae-hee and Heung-soo and appreciated the layered harmony of the story. Although Heung-soo is a sexual minority, Noh said he did not see that aspect as a burden, believing it was more important to understand the character rather than focus on a specific trait.

Kim Go-eun also shared that she had waited two and a half years for the project to be finalized after first receiving the script. She said she was drawn to the sincerity and natural flow of the story, and appreciated how the narrative unfolded in a candid, conversational way.

== Release ==
In July 2024, the film rights were acquired by KDDI in Japan; Moviecloud in Taiwan; The Filmbridge in Mongolia; CJ HK Entertainment in Vietnam; Purple Plan in Singapore and Indonesia; CJ HK Entertainment in Thailand, Cambodia, Myanmar, and Laos; Neofilms in Hong Kong and Macau; and Great Movies/A2 Films in Latin America. A teaser trailer for the film was released on August 13, 2024. A second trailer was released on September 12, 2024.

The film premiered at the Toronto International Film Festival on September 13, 2024. It received a theatrical release in South Korea on October 1, 2024. It was selected as the closing film at the 2024 London Korean Film Festival.

=== Marketing ===
Ahead of its theatrical release, Love in the Big City unveiled its official poster and trailer. The marketing campaign highlighted the ambiguous relationship between a man and a woman. The trailer included captions such as "Love without regrets, life with honesty—Kim Go-eun and Noh Sang-hyun's emotionally resonant take on love" and "Love is hands-off, friendship is forever—100% pure, real-life best friends." This promotional approach notably frames their relationship as a heterosexual romance, which can be interpreted as a strategic decision to market a queer narrative in a more hetero-normative or ambiguous way for broader commercial appeal.

== Reception ==
=== Box office ===
Love in the Big City recorded a cumulative audience of 879,109 and a total gross revenue of ₩8,303,965,930.

=== Accolades ===
Award ceremony	Year	Category	Nominee	Result	Ref.
Baeksang Arts Awards	2025	Best Film	Love in the Big City	Nominated	
Baeksang Arts Awards	2025	Best Director	E.oni	Nominated	
Baeksang Arts Awards	2025	Best Actress	Kim Go-eun	Nominated	
Baeksang Arts Awards	2025	Best New Actor	Noh Sang-hyun	Nominated	
Baeksang Arts Awards	2025	Gucci Impact Award	Love in the Big City	Nominated	
Blue Dragon Film Awards	2024	Best New Actor	Noh Sang-hyun	Won	
Blue Dragon Film Awards	2024	Best Music	Primary	Won	
Buil Film Awards	2025	Best Director	E.oni	Nominated	
Buil Film Awards	2025	Best Actress	Kim Go-eun	Won	
Buil Film Awards	2025	Best New Actor	Noh Sang-hyun	Nominated	
Buil Film Awards	2025	Best Music	Primary	Nominated	
Cine21	2024	Best Actress	Kim Go-eun	Won	
Cine21	2024	Best New Actor	Noh Sang-hyun	Won	
Director's Cut Awards	2025	Best Actress (Film)	Kim Go-eun	Nominated	
Director's Cut Awards	2025	Best New Actor (Film)	Noh Sang-hyun	Nominated	
Korean Film Producers Association Awards	2024	Best New Actor	Noh Sang-hyun	Won	
Women in Film Korea Festival	2024	Best Actress	Kim Go-eun	Won	
Women in Film Korea Festival	2024	Best Director	E.oni	Won	

== See also ==
- Love in the Big City (TV series)
- Love in the Big City (novel)
- Sang Young Park
