= Top Star U-back =

2018 South Korean television series

- Promotional poster
- Hangul: 톱스타 유백이
- Lit.: Top Star Yoo Baek
- RR: Topseuta Yubaegi
- MR: T'opsŭt'a Yubaegi
- Genre: Romantic comedy
- Written by: Lee Si-eun; Lee So-jeong
- Directed by: Yoo Hak-chan
- Starring: Kim Ji-seok; Jeon So-min; Lee Sang-yeob
- Music by: Kim Joon-seok; Jeong Se-rin
- Country of origin: South Korea
- Original language: Korean
- No. of episodes: 11

Production
- Production company: tvN

Original release
- Network: tvN
- Release: November 16, 2018 – January 25, 2019

Top Star U-back (Korean: 톱스타 유백이) is a 2018 South Korean television series starring Kim Ji-seok, Jeon So-min and Lee Sang-yeob. It aired once a week on Fridays from November 16, 2018 to February 1, 2019 at 23:00 KST on tvN.

== Synopsis ==
The story of a narcissistic, former idol and A-list actor who is banished to a remote island after causing some major trouble. While struggling to adapt to his new surroundings, he eventually strikes up a romance with an islander who has very little in common.

== Casts ==
=== Main ===
- Kim Ji-seok as Yoo Baek
  - Ji Min-hyuk as young Yoo Baek

A narcissistic A-list actor and former idol. After causing some major trouble, Yoo Baek is forced to lie low for a while, and he ends up leaving Seoul for a temporary stay on a remote island.

- Jeon So-min as Oh Kang-soon

An unsophisticated, tough-as-nails islander who is unpredictable but bright and optimistic. She is hardworking and does not care about anything aside from her studies, her work as a diver, or the supermarket she runs.

- Lee Sang-yeob as Choi Ma-dol

A sailor and the top star of Yeojeuk Island, who makes a glorious return home on a deep-sea fishing vessel

=== Supporting ===
- Jung Eun-pyo as Kim Gook-seop

Dong-choon's father

- Jung Yi-rang as Lee Hyang-gi

Dong-choon's mother

- Huh Jin as Jang Heung-deuk
- Song Byung-suk as Goon San-deuk
- Lee Han-wi as Choi Han-bong

Choi Ma-dol's father

- Kim Hyun as Yang Bang-sil

Choi Ma-dol's mother

- Yoo Joo-won as Park Dong-man
- Kim Jung-min as Kang Min

Teacher of island

- Lee Ah-hyun as Ah Seo-ra/Ashura

Only doctor of island, have a crush on Kang Min

- Ye Soo-jung as Kang-soon's grandmother
- Jung Ji-yoon as Cha-e
- Jo Hee-bong as Seo-il

Yoo Baek's CEO

- Huh Jung-min as Nam Jo

Yoo Baek's rival

- Kim Min-suk as Park Dong-choon

Yoo Baek's manager

- Yoon Bok-in as Yoo Baek's mother
- Kwon Hyuk as Min-hyeok

=== Special appearances ===
- Baek Il-seob as himself (Ep. 1)
- Han Suk-joon as MC in ceremony (Ep. 1)
- Hong Yun-hwa as woman in police station (Ep. 1)
- Im Soo-hyang as herself (Ep. 3)
- Yoo In-na as radio host DJ (Ep. 5, voice only)
- Nam Bo-ra as Noh Hae-won (Ep. 7, 11)
- Yang Se-chan (Ep. 11)
- Kang Hong-seok as Detective when Yoo Baek refused breathalyzer test

== Production ==
The first script reading for the drama was held on September 5, 2018 with the attendance of cast and crew.

== Original soundtrack ==
Top Star U-back OST

Soundtrack album by Various artists
- Recorded: 2018
- Genre: Soundtrack
- Languages: Korean; English
- Labels: Genie Music; Stone Music Entertainment

=== Part 1 ===
Released on December 21, 2018
No.	Title	Lyrics	Music	Artist	Length
1.	"Everything At That Moment" (모든 것 그 순간)	Dong Woo-seok	Dong Woo-seok	Dong Woo-seok	3:22
2.	"Everything At That Moment" (Inst.)		Dong Woo-seok		3:22
Total length:					6:44

=== Part 2 ===
Released on December 28, 2018
No.	Title	Lyrics	Music	Artist	Length
1.	"Dawn" (새벽)	December 32nd	Taebongie	Ryu Ji-hyun	3:41
2.	"Dawn" (Inst.)		Taebongie		3:41
Total length:					7:22

=== Part 3 ===
Released on January 11, 2019
No.	Title	Lyrics	Music	Artist	Length
1.	"Dream"	Dong Woo-seok	Dong Woo-seok	Parc Jae-jung	3:48
2.	"Dream" (Inst.)		Dong Woo-seok		3:48
Total length:					7:36

== Ratings ==
Top Star U-back : South Korea viewers per episode (thousands)

Season	Episode number											Average
Season	1	2	3	4	5	6	7	8	9	10	11	Average
1	570	603	630	592	528	484	472	449	442	486	760	547

Source: Audience measurement performed nationwide by Nielsen Media Research.

Average TV viewership ratings
Ep.	Original broadcast date	Average audience share (AGB Nielsen)	
Ep.	Original broadcast date	Nationwide	Seoul
1	November 16, 2018	2.829%	3.372%
2	November 23, 2018	2.806%	2.733%
3	November 30, 2018	3.094%	3.196%
4	December 7, 2018	2.846%	3.067%
5	December 14, 2018	2.230%	2.067%
6	December 21, 2018	2.367%	2.160%
7	December 28, 2018	2.038%	2.053%
8	January 4, 2019	2.043%	2.072%
9	January 11, 2019	1.941%	2.195%
10	January 18, 2019	2.048%	2.328%
11	January 25, 2019	2.891%	3.010%
Average		2.467%	2.568%
In the table above, the blue numbers represent the lowest ratings and the red numbers represent the highest ratings.; This drama aired on a cable channel/pay TV which normally has a relatively smaller audience compared to free-to-air TV/public broadcasters (KBS, SBS, MBC and EBS).

== Adaptation ==
The series was adapted in Mandarin, under the title Breeze by the Sea (不如海邊吹吹風) from Central Motion Picture Corporation, Deepwaters Digital Support Inc; and CJ ENM Hong Kong. Starring Bolin Chen and Puff Kuo on their second appearances following Small and Mighty, the adaptation was filmed in the Kinmen, Taiwan. The series was set to be premiered on December 14, 2024.
