= Dengue Boy =

Novel by Michel Nieva

- English-language first edition cover
- Author: Michel Nieva
- Original title: La infancia del mundo
- Translator: Rahul Bery
- Language: Spanish
- Publisher: Anagrama
- Publication date: February 8, 2023
- Publication place: Barcelona
- English publication date: February 4, 2025
- Media type: Print (paperback)
- Pages: 159
- ISBN: 9788433901781

Dengue Boy (Spanish: La infancia del mundo, lit. 'The Infancy of the World') is a 2023 post-apocalyptic novel by Argentine writer Michel Nieva.

== Plot ==
The novel is set in Argentina of 2272. Most of the country is flooded by the rising ocean due to climate change and turned into an archipelago known as "Pampas Caribbean". Dengue Boy is a giant humanoid mosquito born to a human mother. Humiliated in a summer camp, he suddenly becomes Dengue Girl and unleashes a revenge.

== Publication history ==
The novel is an expanded author's short story "El niño dengue" ["The Dengue Boy"], which received the 2022 O. Henry Award. It was published in Granta magazine, translated by Natasha Wimmer.

The novel was translated into English as Dengue Boy in 2025 by Rahul Bery. In an article for LitHub, Bery described the novel as "a watershed in my journey as a translator."

== Themes ==
Jake Casella Brookins of Locus Magazine wrote that the novel demonstrates "how cosmic horror applies to climate fiction, how these ideas of ancient evil and human derangement are newly relevant in addressing both natural and social crises."

Max Pearl of The Guardian wrote that the novel was "anti-capitalist satire," saying that the core drama of the novel was "capitalism's discontents coming home to roost."

== Reception ==
Publishers Weekly praised the novel as "ingenious and outré," saying that, "delightfully gonzo and hilariously surreal, this novel turns nightmarish visions into vital art. It’s a sui generis showstopper." Doug Johnstone of The Big Issue reviewed the novel as "bizarre but utterly compelling," saying it was "a propulsive novel with a relentless pace, throwing literary allusions and gory madness at the reader." Matt Reynolds of Wired reviewed the novel as "brilliantly strange," saying that it "skips across economics, sexuality, biology, and temporality without ever really drawing breath." Kirkus Reviews described the novel as "hallucinogenic cocktail" and as a "hyperkinetic, audacious grotesquerie." David Hebblethwaite of Strange Horizons wrote that "I've read novels that destroy themselves before, but rarely have they done so with the gleeful abandon of Dengue Boy. This book demands the reader trusts that author Michel Nieva knows where he’s going. He absolutely does know, but you should strap yourself in for the journey," noting the novel's "striking imaginative set pieces" and that it "feels larger than reality throughout."

The book was a finalist for the 2026 Locus Award for Best Translated Novel.
