= Beyond the Story =

Biography about South Korean pop band BTS

Beyond the Story: 10-Year Record of BTS
- First edition with dust jacket
- Author: Kang Myeong-seok and BTS
- Translator: Anton Hur, in collaboration with Clare Richards and Slin Jung
- Language: Korean
- Subject: Biography
- Publisher: BigHit Music (South Korea); Flatiron Books (United States)
- Publication date: July 9, 2023
- Publication place: South Korea
- Pages: 544
- ISBN: 978-1-035-03154-2 (UK) / 978-1-250-32675-1 (US)

Beyond the Story: 10 Year Record of BTS is a 2023 biography about South Korean boy group BTS. The book is written by Kang Myeong-seok and BTS, and translated into English by Anton Hur in collaboration with Clare Richards and Slin Jung. It was released on July 9, 2023.

The novel was translated into 23 languages and is divided into seven chapters: "Seoul", "Why We Exist", "Love, Hate, Army", "Inside Out", "A Flight That Never Lands", "The World Of BTS" and "We Are".

== Background ==
In early May 2023, the book appeared on pre-order lists of booksellers, though with scant information. The book's U.S. publisher, Flatiron Books, an imprint of Macmillan Publishers, titled it "4C Untitled Flatiron Nonfiction Summer 2023", described it as a "biography or autobiography" and numbering 544 pages. Later, a message sent by Flatiron to booksellers was posted on social media; more details on the book were to be revealed on June 13, ahead of its publication date on July 9, and that the book has an initial print run of 1 million copies.

The limited information released drove fan discussions on social media about the author and subject of the book. Some noted the book's unusual release date, July 9, falls on a Sunday, when most books are traditionally released on Tuesdays. Others predicted that the book's massive initial print run of 1 million and short period of time between announcement and publication suggests a famous author.

In particular, fans of American singer-songwriter Taylor Swift speculated that the book is her memoir. Swift frequently alluded to the number 13 as her lucky number, and fans believed that the date of June 13 and the fact that the book's page count of 544 adds up to 13 are easter eggs alluding to her involvement. Furthermore, fans also believed that the date of July 9 is a reference to the song "Last Kiss" on her album Speak Now, and that Swift had left clues in her announcement of the re-recorded version, Speak Now (Taylor's Version).

The rumor was fueled further when a number of bookstores in the U.S. made social media posts alluding to Swift, resulting in a surge in pre-orders—one bookstore received more than 600—though all were canceled after their owners were asked by Flatiron to remove their social media posts. The unreleased book also became a bestseller on several online bookstores, such as Amazon and Barnes & Noble. However, on May 9, Variety published an article denying that the book's author is Swift.

At the same time, there was also speculation the book is about BTS. It was pointed out that June 13, 2023, is the 10th anniversary of the release of BTS' first single, "No More Dream", from their debut album 2 Cool 4 Skool. Additionally, July 9, 2023, marked the 10th anniversary of the founding of ARMY, the BTS fan group. On May 11, The New York Times, citing Flatiron, confirmed that the book is an oral history of BTS, written by the journalist Kang Myeong-seok and members of the group. The book is translated into English by Anton Hur in collaboration with Clare Richards and Slin Jung. In South Korea, it is published by BigHit Music, BTS' music label.

== Reception ==
=== Commercial ===
Following the easter eggs, the book was released on July 9, 2023, and reached number 1 on the New York Times best-seller list at its release as well as place number-one 24 hours after releasing on the Amazon best-seller list.
