= I Want to Die but I Want to Eat Tteokbokki =

2018 memoir by Baek Se-hee

- Author: Baek Se-hee
- Original title: 죽고 싶지만 떡볶이는 먹고 싶어
- Translator: Anton Hur
- Language: Korean
- Subject: Mental health
- Genre: Memoir, self-help
- Set in: 21st century Earth
- Published: Kim So Ari
- Publisher: Self-published, Penguin Random House
- Publication date: February 2018
- Publication place: South Korea
- English publication date: November 1, 2022
- Pages: 208 (English)
- ISBN: 978-1635579383

I Want to Die but I Want to Eat Tteokbokki (Korean: 죽고 싶지만 떡볶이는 먹고 싶어; RR: Jukgo sipjiman tteokbokkineun meokgo sipeo) is a 2018 memoir by Baek Se-hee. The book follows Baek's conversations with her psychiatrist regarding her depression while also addressing other topics related to mental health and selfhood. Since its self-publishing in 2018, the book has become a nationwide bestseller and been translated in 25 countries, selling over a million copies total worldwide. In 2022, an English translation by translator Anton Hur was published by Bloomsbury Publishing.

== Production ==
The book was initially self-published throughout 2018 through Tumblbug, a South Korean crowdfunding site. In total, Baek's project on behalf of the memoir's production and distribution received 20 million won from 1,292 supporters, exceeding Baek's original target of 1.5 million won. After the project's closure, Baek sold approximately 2,500 copies in three editions distributed to small bookstores across South Korea. The first edition was printed in February, the second edition was printed in April, and the third edition was printed in June. Later in 2018, the manuscript was acquired and edited by Heun Publishing for even larger distribution. Heun Publishing would also handle Baek's sequel to the book.

== Contents ==
The book contains records of conversations which Baek had with her psychiatrist, specifically regarding her diagnosis of dysthymia. Baek had begun seeing her psychiatrist while she was working as a social media director for a publishing house. In addition, Baek includes essays which reflect further on issues pertaining to mental health, dating, womanhood, and trauma.

== Critical reception ==
Kirkus Reviews wrote that the book can be universally relatable despite the fact that "Some of the author's discussions relate directly to Korean culture". Publishers Weekly found the debut "stilted", with some of its serious topics "lost in the weeds", and wrote that "Sehee's mission to normalize conversation about mental illness is an admirable one, but this memoir fails to animate that goal."

Many critics lauded Baek's transparency in addressing her struggle with depression. The Kathmandu Post wrote that "The author's real-life experiences enrich the book, making it compelling. Readers can resonate with her struggles, adding an engaging dimension to her narrative." Others in the west found it unprecedented for a South Korean book to address mental health so poignantly, which Hur refuted as a "condescending reaction" resulting from "prejudices and ignorance", as the book was "hardly the first time a Korean writer has talked about depression" and self-help was already "a thriving genre" around the book's domestic release.

Several publications included the book on must-read lists. The New York Times recommended the book in a list of memoirs and biographies for fall of 2022. Foyles picked the book to be their Translated Book of the Month in July 2023. Book Riot picked the book for their list of 8 Books for Women in Translation month in 2024. It also received a recommendation by RM, the leader of South Korean boy band BTS, which Hur believed greatly assisted the book's sales internationally.

== Sequel ==
I Want to Die but I Still Want to Eat Tteokbokki (죽고 싶지만 떡볶이는 먹고 싶어 2; Jukgo sipjiman tteokbokkineun meokgo sipeo 2) is the 2019 sequel to Baek's memoir, published in South Korea by Heun Publishing. The sequel contains more records of Baek's conversations with her psychiatrist. An English translation by Hur was released in 2024, with Bloomsbury Publishing having acquired the sequel's rights in 2023 following the first book's success.
