= On the Calculation of Volume =

Novel series by Solvej Balle

- 2025 Book cover
- Author: Solvej Balle
- Audio read by: Elizabeth Liang
- Translator: Barbara J. Haveland (I & II), Sophia Hersi Smith and Jennifer Russell (III-IV)
- Subject: Time loop, Climate change, Marriage, Space and Time
- Genre: Science fiction, Literary fiction
- Publication place: United Kingdom, United States
- ISBN: 9780811237253
- OCLC: 1468698459
- Website: Official website New Directions; Official website Faber & Faber
- Originally published in Denmark by Pelagraf c. 2020, translated from Danish

On the Calculation of Volume (Danish: Om udregning af rumfang) is a seven-novel-series written by Solvej Balle. Six volumes have been published in the original Danish. The work is currently being translated into more than twenty other languages; as of 2026 the first five volumes have been translated into English. The first three volumes won the 2022 Nordic Council Literature Prize. The English translation of the first volume was shortlisted for the 2025 International Booker Prize.

== Volumes ==
Volume	Publication date	Publisher	English publication date	English Publisher	Translator
I	February 2, 2020	Pelagraf	November 18, 2024	New Directions (US) / Faber & Faber (UK)	Barbara J. Haveland
II	November 3, 2020	Pelagraf	November 26, 2024	New Directions (US) / Faber & Faber (UK)	Barbara J. Haveland
III	September 21, 2021	Pelagraf	November 18, 2025	New Directions (US) / Faber & Faber (UK)	Sophia Hersi Smith and Jennifer Russell
IV	November 18, 2022	Pelagraf	April 14, 2026	New Directions (US) / Faber & Faber (UK)	Sophia Hersi Smith and Jennifer Russell
V	November 28, 2023	Pelagraf	November 17, 2026	New Directions (US) / Faber & Faber (UK)	Sophia Hersi Smith and Jennifer Russell
VI	August 20, 2025	Pelagraf	June 2027	Faber & Faber (UK)	TBD
VII	TBD	Pelagraf	November 2027	Faber & Faber (UK)	TBD

== Plot ==
A time loop drives the story. In Solvej Balle's interpretation of the time loop trope, Tara Selter, a dealer in rare and antique books, keeps repeating a single day, November 18, except that Tara's starting location for each day is not fixed. Rather, she begins each new day wherever she ended the previous day. This gives her far more freedom than other time loop protagonists, including those found in the 1993 film Groundhog Day or the 2020 film Palm Springs.

In volume I, Tara describes how she first began looping during a trip to Paris and she details the days since she returned to her home in rural France, where she lives with her husband Thomas. Only Tara retains a memory of the previous November 18ths, and she has to start every day by convincing her husband of what is happening to her. Meanwhile, her body and some material objects continue to move through time. An injury she received in Paris slowly heals, groceries vanish overnight, and her handwritten notes do not.

In volume II, Tara uses her freedom to travel throughout Europe, visiting different climates in an attempt to experience the seasons. She eventually comes to terms with the fact that she will live in November 18th indefinitely and begins attending lectures at a university in Düsseldorf, where she meets another person who is also experiencing a time loop.

In volume III, Tara establishes a shared apartment with Henry, the other person who is experiencing a time loop, and they discuss the nature of time and history. While Tara is visiting her husband Thomas, she also meets Olga, a teenager trapped inside of November 18th who is searching for her own companion, Ralf. After seeing himself in a poster campaign by Tara, Henry, and Olga, Ralf comes to meet the group in Düsseldorf. Olga and Ralf believe that they are meant to change the world on November 18th, although they disagree on how: Ralf seeks to avert small disasters, using knowledge of unstable buildings and auto accidents from previous November 18ths to save lives, while Olga believes only systematic change is useful for building a better November 19th. Both of these viewpoints are in contrast to the goals of Tara and Henry, who have mostly focused on minimizing harm by eating expired food and not using up resources. The group eventually move into a large abandoned house in Bremen. At the close of the novel, a group of others knocks on the door.

== Critical reception ==
This book has received positive reviews:

In The New York Times, Hilary Leichter wrote: "Here, the time-loop narrative takes on new and stunning proportions. Whereas the reader expects the loop to be straightened by sheer will or gamed through kindness, Balle dismisses such resolutions for something much more compelling. 'I no longer believe that I will suddenly wake up to a time that has returned to normal,' ... Tara Selter, thinks."

Jake Casella Brookins wrote in Locus magazine: "Balle's combination of narrator and setup is quietly genius. On the Calculation of Volume is not about comic repetition in the style of Groundhog Day, more in tune with the uncertainty and uncanniness of something like Russian Doll.... Balle has nailed – and Haveland has ably translated – a remarkably believable, organic voice, a kind of quotidian existential mode that is equally suited to evocative descriptions of the world and to perceptive ruminations on the nature of time, relationships, and the self."

In The Atlantic, Rhian Sasseen wrote: "On the Calculation of Volume's premise could, in other hands, be reduced to a gimmick. But in Haveland's rendering, Balle's stripped-down prose has an understated clarity that lends philosophical resonance to this fantastical setup."

Morten Hoi Jensen wrote in The Washington Post that "Written in intermittent diary-like entries of varying length, On the Calculation of Volume is at once scrupulously realistic and intriguingly speculative. Balle succeeds in conveying the texture of Tara's changing feelings, her shifting moods. There are moments of crisis and accident interspersed with bursts of enthusiasm and even, at times, hope."

On the Calculation of Volume volume III was a finalist for the 2025 National Book Critics Circle Award for Fiction. It won the inaugural Locus Award for Best Translated Novel in 2026.
