= Solvej Balle =

Danish writer

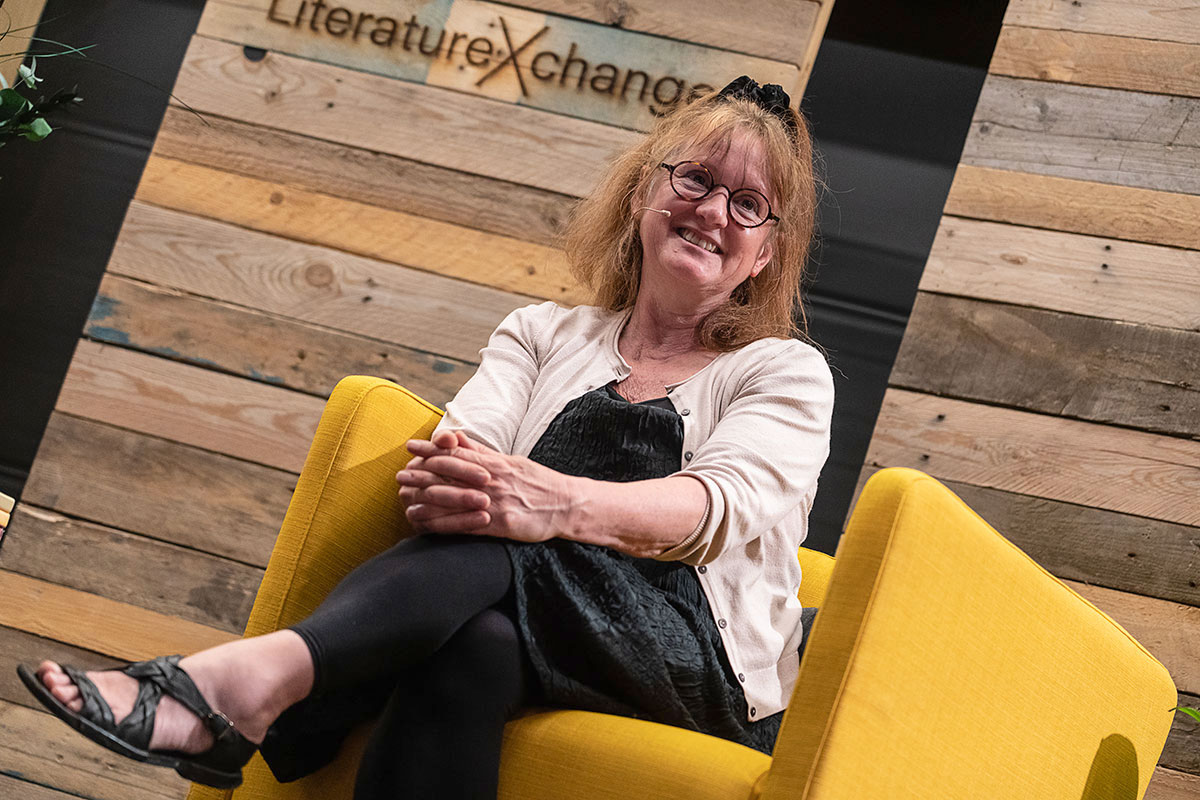
- Balle in Aarhus in 2023
- Born: August 16, 1962 (age 64); Bovrup, Denmark
- Occupation: Writer
- Writing career
- Language: Danish
- Notable work: On the Calculation of Volume
- Notable awards: Nordic Council Literature Prize

Solvej Balle (born 16 August 1962 in Bovrup, Sønderjylland) is a Danish writer. She is best known for her multi-volume work of fiction, On the Calculation of Volume, the first three books of which won the Nordic Council Literature Prize and the first book of which was shortlisted for the International Booker Prize.

== Biography ==
Balle was born in Bovrup, Sønderjylland in 1962. She studied literature and philosophy at the University of Copenhagen and holds a Master of Arts degree in philosophy from the University of Southern Denmark. She attended Forfatterskolen (The Writers' School) in Copenhagen between 1987 and 1989, and attended philosophy classes as a non-matriculated student at Cornell University in 1990. She became editor of the literary journal Den blå port in 1996.

She has travelled and lived in Europe, Australia, the United States and Canada. In 2005, she moved from Copenhagen to the small Danish island of Ærø, where she still lives.

== Writing career ==
Balle published her debut novel, Lyrefugl (The Lyre Bird), in 1984. It follows the lone survivor of an aircrash on a deserted island, trying to build life from scratch. This was followed by &, a book of short prose published in 1990.

Balle's 1993 collection of four short stories, Ifølge loven, fire beretninger om mennesket, earned her acclaim in Denmark and international recognition. An English translation by Barbara J. Haveland, According to the Law: Four Accounts of Mankind, was published in 1996.

Balle published the first book of her multi-volume work of fiction, Om udregning af rumfang, in 2020. This and the following volumes, of a planned seven, were published by Pelagraf, the publishing company she set up in 2011. The work begins with a Groundhog Day-like time loop, where the narrator, Tara Selter, repeatedly lives through the same day, 18 November.

The first three volumes won the Nordic Council Literature Prize in 2022. Barbara J. Haveland's English translation of Book I as On the Calculation of Volume was published in 2024 and was longlisted for the National Book Award for Translated Literature. In 2025, it was shortlisted for the International Booker Prize. On the Calculation of Volume (Book III) was a finalist for the 2025 National Book Critics Circle Award for Fiction and winner of the inaugural Locus Award for Best Translated Novel.

Balle has also published a collection of poems, Eller (1998), a book on art theory, Det umuliges kunst (The art of the impossible, 2005), a political memoir, Frydendal og andre gidsler (Frydendal and other hostages, 2008), and two books of short prose, Hvis (If, 2013) and Så (Then, 2013), none of which have been translated into English. In 1989 she co-authored a radio play, Et netværk af stemmer, from a draft by Jens Christian Grøndahl. In 1992, with Anne Marie Dinesen and Christian Dorph, she translated Rosmarie Waldrop's The Reproduction of Profiles into Danish as Gengivelse af profiler.

== Works ==
- Lyrefugl (1986, novel)
- & (1990, short prose)
- Ifølge loven, fire beretninger om mennesket (1993, short prose).
  - According to the Law: Four Accounts of Mankind, trans. Barbara J. Haveland (Harvill Press, 1996) ISBN 9781860461293
- Eller (1998, poems)
- Det umuliges kunst (2005, art theory)
- Frydendal – og andre gidsler (2008, memoir)
- Hvis (2013)
- Så (2013)
- Om udregning af rumfang, I–VII (2020–2026). On the Calculation of Volume, I–VI (2024–)
  - Book I, trans. Barbara J. Haveland (New Directions, 2024) ISBN 9780811237253
  - Book II, trans. Barbara J. Haveland (New Directions, 2024) ISBN 9780811237277
  - Book III, trans. Sophia Hersi Smith and Jennifer Russell (New Directions, 2025) ISBN 9780571383429
  - Book IV, trans. Sophia Hersi Smith and Jennifer Russell (New Directions, 2026) ISBN 9780811238410
  - Book V, trans. Sophia Hersi Smith and Jennifer Russell (New Directions, 2026) ISBN 9780811240390
  - Book VI, trans. Sophia Hersi Smith and Jennifer Russell (New Directions, 2027)
