= Sang Young Park =

South Korean writer (born 1988)

- Born: 1988 (age 37–38); Daegu, South Korea
- Education: Sungkyunkwan University
- Occupations: Novelist, TVWriter
- Writing career
- Language: Korean
- Period: 2016–present
- Genres: Queer, Romance
- Notable work: Love in the Big City
- Notable awards: International Booker Prize

Korean name
- Hangul: 박상영
- Hanja: 朴相映
- RR: Bak Sangyeong
- MR: Pak Sangyŏng

Sang Young Park (Korean: 박상영; born 1988) is a South Korean novelist, TV writer, and essayist. His novel, Love in the Big City, was longlisted for the 2022 International Booker Prize and has been translated into multiple languages.

== Life and career ==
Sang Young Park was born in 1988 in Daegu, South Korea. He studied Journalism and French at Sungkyunkwan University and later pursued graduate studies in Creative Writing at Dongguk University.

Park made his literary debut with his short story collection, The Tears of an Unknown Artist, or Zaytun Pasta (2018). His breakthrough came with the novel Love in the Big City (2019), which was translated into English by Anton Hur and published in 2021 by Grove Atlantic in the United States and Tilted Axis Press in the United Kingdom. The novel was longlisted for the 2022 International Booker Prize, and the Dublin Literary Award. Also, the French edition (S'aimer dans la grande ville) was longlisted for the Prix Médicis étranger. He is regarded as a prominent young Korean writer on the international stage.

In addition to his literary career, Park has worked as a TV writer. His novel Love in the Big City has been adapted into a television series, which premiered in 2024.

== Works in Korean ==
Novels

- 대도시의 사랑법 (Love in the Big City) (2019)
- 1차원이 되고 싶어 (Lie Like Lines) (2021)
- 믿음에 대하여 (About Faith) (2022)

Short story collections

- 알려지지 않은 예술가의 눈물과 자이툰 파스타 (The Tears of an Unknown Artist, or Zaytun Pasta) (2018)

Essays and memoirs

- 오늘밤은 굶고 자야지 (I'm Fasting Tonight) (2020)
- 순도 100퍼센트의 휴식 (Relaxation of 100% Purity) (2023)

Television series

- 대도시의 사랑법 (Love in the Big City) (2024)
