= Jennifer Russell (lacrosse) =

American lacrosse player

Personal information
- Nationality: USA
- Born: August 2, 1987 (age 39) Boston, Massachusetts, USA
- Height: 5 ft 7 in (170 cm)

Sport
- Position: Defender
- Shoots: Left/Right
- NCAA team: North Carolina Tar Heels
- Pro career: 2006–
Medal record
World Championships
Gold medal – first place	2013 Canada
The World Games
Gold medal – first place	2017 Wroclaw	Lacrosse

Jennifer Anne Russell (born August 2, 1987 in Boston) is an American women's lacrosse player. Having played with the North Carolina Tar Heels at the collegiate level, she was named to the US national team for the 2015–16 season. In 2016, she was selected by the Boston Storm with their second pick overall in the inaugural United Women's Lacrosse League Draft.

== Playing career ==
=== NCAA ===
Russell served as a three-time captain with the North Carolina Tar Heels, playing at the midfield position. She would graduate from the program with 119 points, scoring 93 goals. Her 38 goals in 2009 led all Tar Heels players, as she scored at least one goal in 19 of 21 games. Russell's season-high was a four-goal effort against the Oregon Ducks. In her senior season (2010), she was recognized as one of the tri-captains, leading the team with 22 caused turnovers.

=== USA Lacrosse ===
A member of the US Developmental Team from 2008 to 2010, she would play in her first World Cup in 2013. At the 2013 Women's Lacrosse World Cup, Russell competed at the defender position and picked up seven ground balls and forced five turnovers, helping the US capture the gold medal.

== Awards and honors ==
- 2009 All-ACC first team
- 2009 ACC Academic Honor Roll
- 2009 IWLCA All-America first team
- 2009 NCAA All-Tournament team
- 2009 Tar Heel Leader of Distinction Award
- 2010 All-ACC first team
- 2010 IWLCA All-America first team
- 2010 Tewaaraton Award finalist
