= Nam Yoon-su =

South Korean actor (born 1997)

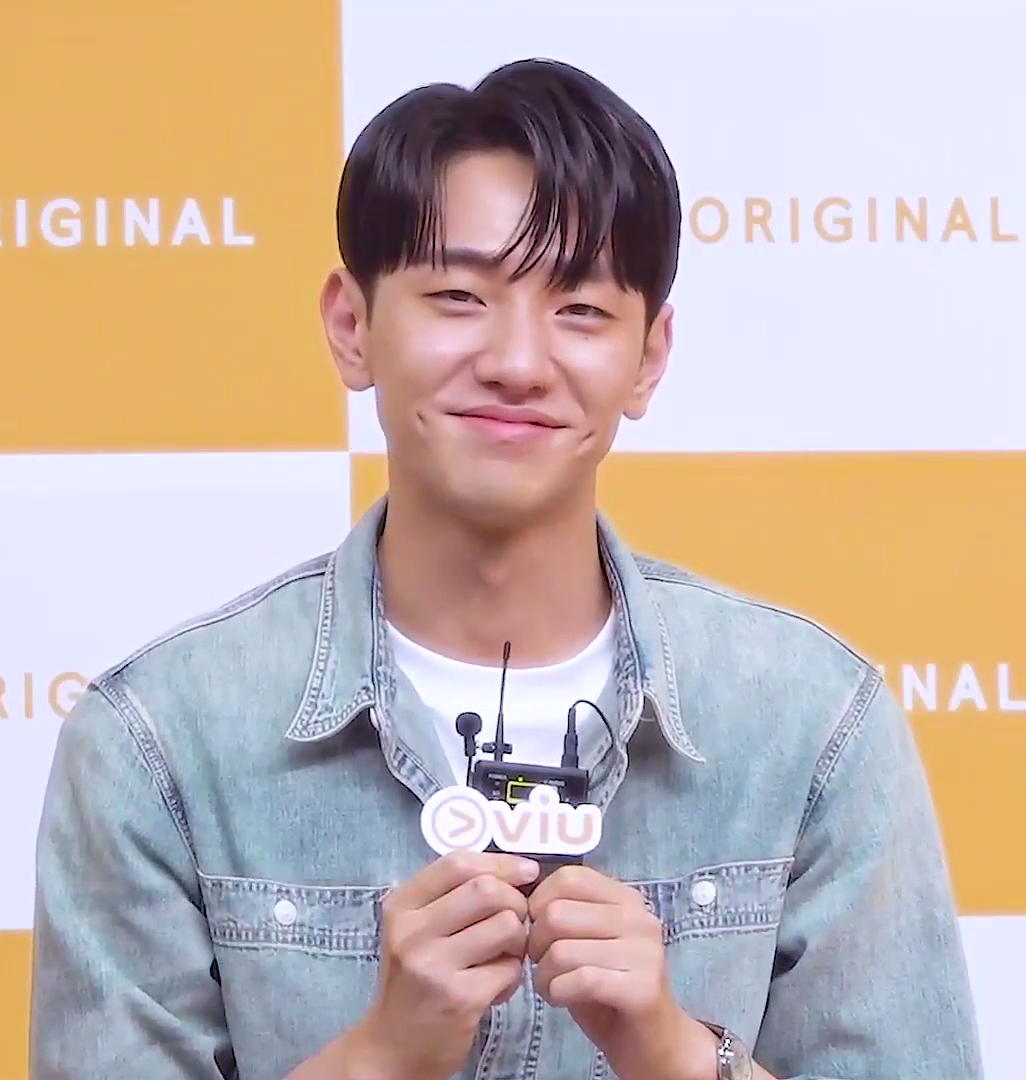
- Nam in September 2022
- Born: July 14, 1997 (age 29); Namyangju, Gyeonggi Province, South Korea
- Education: Hanlim Multi Art School - Fashion Model Department; Digital Seoul Culture Arts University - Modelling Department; Korea Art Conservatory - Film Art Department
- Occupations: Actor; model
- Years active: 2014–present
- Agent: Agency Garten

Korean name
- Hangul: 남윤수
- Hanja: 南尹洙
- RR: Nam Yunsu
- MR: Nam Yunsu

Nam Yoon-su (Korean: 남윤수; born July 14, 1997) is a South Korean actor and model. He has appeared in Netflix's original drama series Extracurricular (2020), tvN's Birthcare Center (2020), JTBC's Beyond Evil (2021), KBS's The King's Affection (2021), and Love in the Big City (2024), playing as the main character in the latter.

== Career ==
Nam made his debut as a model in 2014, and made his acting debut through music videos in 2014 and 2015.

In 2018, Nam made his official acting debut through MBC Every 1 drama 4 Kinds of House, and in the same year he appeared in the web drama Want More 19.

In 2019, he made a special appearance in the web drama Re-Feel, and participated in the web drama I'm Not A Robot.

In 2020, Nam appeared in the web drama The Temperature Of Language: Our Nineteen. Later, he appeared in the Netflix series Extracurricular, which led him to gain in recognition, and he was nominated for the Best New Actor – Television in the 57th Baeksang Arts Awards. Nam then appeared in the short film Live Your Strength with Bae Suzy and later appeared in tvN drama Birthcare Center.

In 2021, Nam joined Mnet's M Countdown as a host with (G)I-dle's Miyeon. Nam then joined the drama Beyond Evil which premiered in February on JTBC. Nam was also cast in KBS2 drama The King's Affection which premiered in October.

In 2022, Nam appeared in the SBS drama Today's Webtoon alongside Kim Se-jeong and Choi Daniel, which premiered in July.

In 2024, Nam played the main character of the South Korean LGBTQ-related series Love in the Big City as Go Young, depicting the 10-year journey of a young gay man learning about life and love through ups and downs in a conservative society while also trying to become a successful writer.

== Personal life ==
Nam donated his kidney to his father on June 19, 2024.

== Filmography ==
=== Film ===
Year	Title	Role	Notes	Ref.
2020	Live Your Strength	Tae Min	Short film	
2023	Soulmate	Ki-hoon		

=== Television series ===
Year	Title	Role	Notes	Ref.
2018	4 Kinds of House	Joon-ha		
2020	Birthcare Center	Ha Gyeong-hoon		
2020	Extracurricular	Kwak Ki-tae		
2021	Beyond Evil	Oh Ji-hoon		
2021	The King's Affection	Lee Hyun		
2022	Today's Webtoon	Gu Jun-young		
2022	Borrowed Body	Lee Sang-yoo		
2024	Dog Knows Everything	Hyun Ta		
2024	Love in the Big City	Go Young		

=== Web series ===
Year	Title	Role	Notes	Ref.
2018	Want More 19	Lee Gyeom		
2019	Re-Feel	Lee Gyeom	Special appearance	
2019	I'm Not A Robot	Jung Sung-yoon		
2020	The Temperature of Language: Our Nineteen	Lee Chan-sol		

=== Television shows ===
Year	Title	Role	Notes	Ref.
2021–2023	M Countdown	Host	with (G)I-dle's Miyeon (ep. 698 – 780)	

=== Web shows ===
Year	Title	Role	Notes	Ref.
2019	Eat's Seoul	Host	with Kang Min-ah	

=== Music video appearances ===
Year	Artist	Song Title	Ref.
2014	Hong Jae-mok	"당신이 그대가"	
2015	Brother Su ft. Lovey	"Dot"	
2015	Standing Egg	"Yell"	
2015	Lucid Fall	"Still There, Still Here"	
2016	Yoon Jong-shin	"Old School"	
2016	Lee Jin-ah	"I'm Full"	
2016	Thomas Cook	"Goodbye"	
2017	Cheeze	"Be There"	
2017	Lee Jin-ah	"Random"	
2018	Rothy	"Lost Time"	
2018	Epitone Project	"First Love"	
2019	Brown Eyed Soul ft. SOLE	"Right"	
2020	Baek Ji-young	"I Still Love You A Lot"	
2021	Colde ft. Baekhyun	"When Dawn Comes Again"	

== Awards and nominations ==
Name of the award ceremony, year presented, category, nominee of the award, and the result of the nomination
Award ceremony	Year	Category	Nominee / Work	Result	Ref.
Asia Model Awards	2021	Model Star Award	Nam Yoon-su	Won	
Baeksang Arts Awards	2021	Best New Actor – Television	Extracurricular	Nominated	
Brand of the Year Awards	2021	Best New Actor	Nam Yoon-su	Nominated	
Cine21 Film Awards	2024	Series Actor of the Year	Love in the Big City	Won	
KBS Drama Awards	2021	Best New Actor	The King's Affection	Nominated	
