= Noh Sang-hyun =

South Korean actor (born 1990)

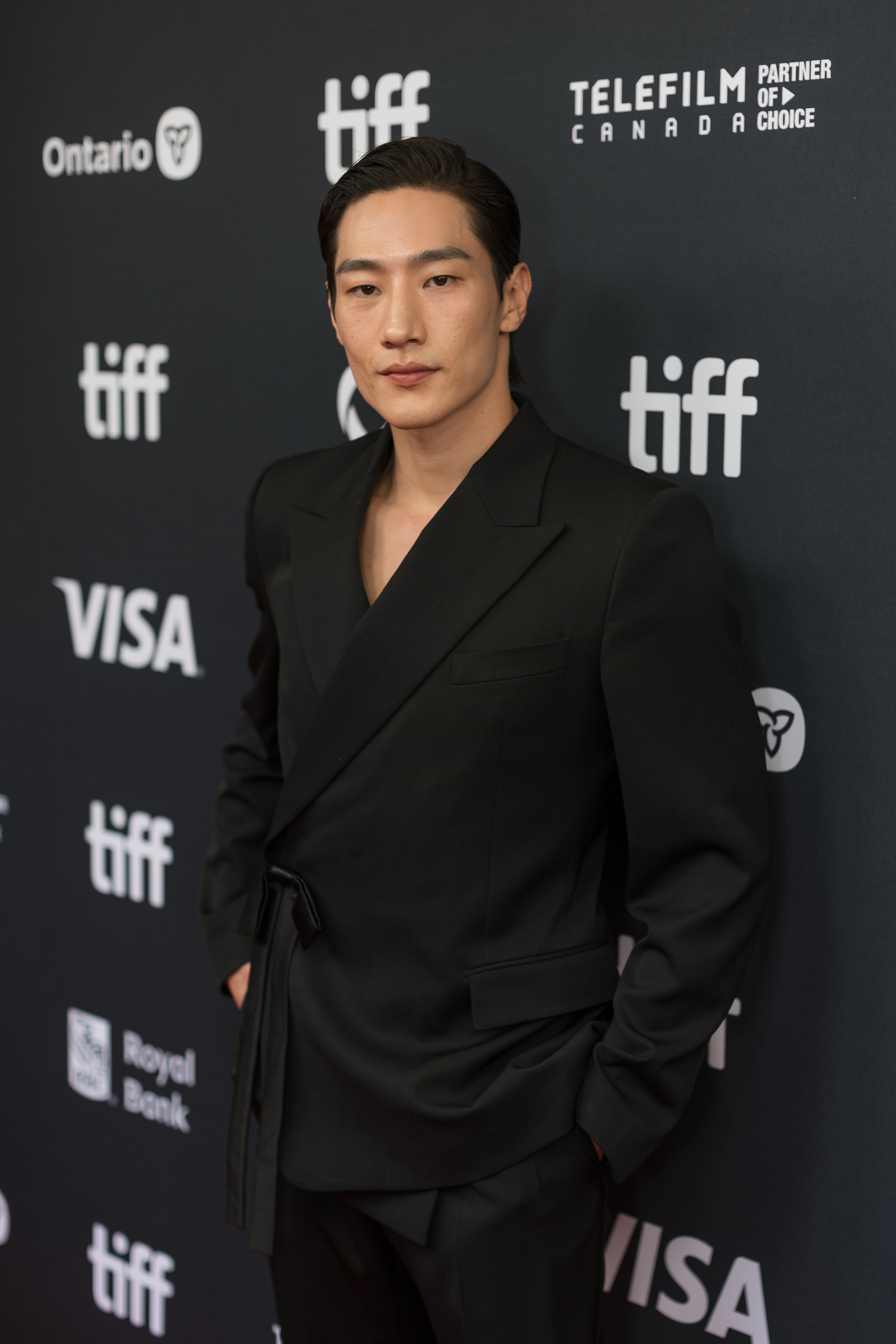
- Noh at the 2024 Toronto International Film Festival
- Born: 19 July 1990 (age 36); South Korea
- Other name: Steve Sanghyun Noh
- Education: Babson College
- Occupations: Actor; model
- Years active: 2015–present
- Agent: HighZium Studio

Korean name
- Hangul: 노상현
- Hanja: 魯尚炫
- RR: No Sanghyeon
- MR: No Sanghyŏn

Noh Sang-hyun (Korean: 노상현; born July 19, 1990), or Steve Sanghyun Noh, is a South Korean actor and model. He is best known for his roles in the film Love in the Big City (2024) and the television series Pachinko (2022–2024).

== Early life and education ==
Noh spent his childhood in Boston, USA, and graduated from the School of Business Administration at Babson College.

== Filmography ==
=== Film ===
Year	Title	Role	Notes	Ref.
2015	Seoul Searching	EO		
2015	The Wicked Are Alive	Man in his 20s	Bit part	
2018	Spring in Summer	David	Short film	
2018	New Old Story	Chris Jung	Cameo	
2019	Money	Overseas sales team broker	Bit part	
2023	Love My Scent	James		
2024	Love in the Big City	Heung-soo		
TBA	Messily Ever After	Hyun-tae		

=== Television series ===
Year	Title	Role	Notes	Ref.
2022–2024	Pachinko	Baek Isak	Season 1–2	
2022	Curtain Call	Ri Moon-sung		
2022	Behind Every Star	Lee Sang-wook		
2023	Soundtrack 2	Ji Su-ho		
2024	My Military Valentine	John Kim		
2025	Genie, Make a Wish	Ryu Su-hyeon / Eljjael		
2026	Perfect Crown	Min Jeong-woo		

=== Web series ===
Year	Title	Role	Notes	Ref.
2017	We Are Peaceful Brothers	Lee Yoon		
2020	XX	Customer	Cameo (episode 3)	
2020	Fight Hard, Love Harder 2	Lee Seong-cheol	Episode 4	
2020	300 Year-Old Class of 2020	Jeon Kang-woon		

=== Television shows ===
Year	Title	Role	Notes	Ref.
2022	With the Silk of Dohpo Flying	Cast Member	with Kim Jong-kook, Ji Hyun-woo, Joo Woo-jae and Hwang Dae-heon	

=== Music video appearances ===
Year	Song	Artist	Ref.
2026	"Blue"	DK X Seungkwan	

== Accolades ==
=== Awards and nominations ===
Name of the award ceremony, year presented, category, nominee of the award, and the result of the nomination
Award ceremony	Year	Category	Nominee / Work	Result	Ref.
Baeksang Arts Awards	2025	Best New Actor – Film	Love in the Big City	Nominated	
Blue Dragon Film Awards	2024	Best New Actor	Love in the Big City	Won	
Buil Film Awards	2025	Best New Actor	Love in the Big City	Nominated	
Cine21 Film Awards	2024	Best New Actor	Love in the Big City	Won	
Director's Cut Awards	2025	Best New Actor (Film)	Love in the Big City	Nominated	
Independent Spirit Awards	2023	Best Ensemble Cast	Pachinko	Won	
KBS Drama Awards	2022	Best New Actor	Curtain Call	Nominated	
Korean Film Producers Association Awards	2024	Best New Actor	Love in the Big City	Won	

=== Listicles ===
Name of publisher, year listed, name of listicle, and placement
Publisher	Year	Listicle	Placement	Ref.
Elle Japan	2022	Rising Star	3rd	
