= Love in the Big City (TV series) =

2024 South Korean television series

- Promotional poster
- Hangul: 대도시의 사랑법
- Hanja: 大都市의 사랑法
- Lit.: How to Love in the Big City
- RR: Daedosiui sarangbeop
- MR: Taedosiŭi sarangbŏp
- Genre: Melodrama; Coming-of-age; Slice of life
- Based on: Love in the Big City by Sang Young Park
- Screenplay by: Sang Young Park
- Directed by: Hur Jin-ho; Hong Ji-young; Son Tae-gyum; Kim Se-in
- Starring: Nam Yoon-su; Lee Soo-kyung; Oh Hyun-kyung; Kwon Hyuk; Na Hyun-woo; Jin Ho-eun; Kim Won-joong
- Country of origin: South Korea
- Original language: Korean
- No. of episodes: 8 (list of episodes)

Production
- Running time: 47–53 minutes
- Production companies: Merrychristmas; Bigstone Studio

Original release
- Network: TVING
- Release: October 21, 2024

Related
- Love in the Big City (film)

Love in the Big City (Korean: 대도시의 사랑법) is a 2024 South Korean melodrama coming-of-age slice of life television series based on the novel of the same name by Sang Young Park, it depicts the journey of a gay man as he navigates life and love in Seoul. The screenplay is written by Park, and co-directed by Hur Jin-ho, Hong Ji-young, Son Tae-gyum and Kim Se-in. The series stars an ensemble cast including Nam Yoon-su, Lee Soo-kyung, Oh Hyun-kyung, Kwon Hyuk, Na Hyun-woo, Jin Ho-eun, and Kim Won-joong. It was released on TVING on October 21, 2024. It is also available for streaming on Viki in selected regions.

== Synopsis ==
Go Young, a gay man, and Choi Mi-ae, a straight woman, live together and become each other's best friend. Young then sets out on a 10-year journey of self-discovery. He faces difficulties in his relationship with his mother, who denies his sexual orientation, and is compelled by social pressure to break up with his lover Sim Gyu-ho. While recuperating from his breakup, Young travels back to Thailand with a stranger named Habibi and discovers more about himself.

== Cast and characters ==
- Nam Yoon-su as Go Young

A gay young man who becomes a writer.

- Lee Soo-kyung as Choi Mi-ae

Young's straight female best friend from university.

- Oh Hyun-kyung as Yeom Eun-suk

Young's mother and a deacon.

- Kwon Hyuk as Kim Nam-kyu

Young's old-fashioned boyfriend who is a photographer.

- Na Hyun-woo as No Yeong-su

Young's boyfriend whom he meets in a philosophy club.

- Jin Ho-eun as Sim Gyu-ho

Young's boyfriend who is a part-time bartender and a nursing student.

- Kim Won-joong as William Habibi

A Japanese businessman.

- Do Yu as Park Ji-tae

Young's flamboyant, free-spirited friend.

- Lee Hyun-so as Han Ho-min

Young's friend and a fan of T-ara.

== Episodes ==
| No. | Title | Directed by | Written by | Original release date |
|---|---|---|---|---|
| 1 2 | "Mi Ae"; Transliteration: "Miae" (Korean: 미애) | Son Tae-gyum | Sang Young Park | October 21, 2024 |
Go Young, a gay university student in Seoul, lives a carefree life until he meets Choi Mi-ae, a classmate with a similarly bold reputation. Bonding over their status as social outcasts, they become roommates. Young enters a relationship with photographer Kim Nam-kyu but struggles with commitment, eventually ending the romance. While Young explores fleeting flings, Mi-ae discovers she is pregnant and undergoes an abortion, with Young providing support. As they mature, Mi-ae stops drinking and secures a corporate job. Inspired by her advice, Young begins writing and eventually publishes a book, Blueberries and Cigarettes, based on their friendship. Tensions arise when Mi-ae introduces her boyfriend, Lee Jun-ho, and Young is forced to come out to him. However, they eventually find closure; Mi-ae marries Jun-ho and moves away, while Young attends Nam-kyu's funeral following a fatal accident. Young eventually moves back into their old apartment, singing at Mi-ae's wedding in a final tribute to his past.
| 3 4 | "A Piece of Rockfish, a Taste Out of This World"; Transliteration: "Ureong han jeom ujuui mat" (Korean: 우럭 한 점 우주의 맛) | Hur Jin-ho | Sang Young Park | October 21, 2024 |
Young becomes the primary caregiver for his mother, Yeom Eun-suk, following her cancer diagnosis. Seeking a mental escape, he joins a philosophy club and falls for No Yeong-su. The two begin a passionate relationship after a deep conversation on Halloween. However, the romance is clouded by Eun-suk's pressure on Young to marry and Young's own trauma regarding his parents' divorce. The relationship fractures when Young discovers Yeong-su's internalized homophobia and a research report reflecting the same biases that led Eun-suk to force Young into conversion therapy years prior. Yeong-su abruptly ends the relationship to move to the United States, leaving a devastated Young to attempt suicide. A year later, Young has become a successful writer. He receives an apologetic letter and an essay from Yeong-su titled A Bite of Rockfish, A Taste of the Universe, but chooses to discard them. Ultimately, Young finds a sense of peace when he discovers a photo revealing his mother's quiet acceptance of his identity before her health declined.
| 5 6 | "Love in the Big City"; Transliteration: "Daedosiui sarangbeop" (Korean: 대도시의 사랑법) | Hong Ji-young | Sang Young Park | October 21, 2024 |
Following his mother's funeral, Young meets bartender Sim Gyu-ho. The two begin a relationship, and Young eventually discloses that he is HIV positive. Despite the diagnosis, Gyu-ho embraces him, and they eventually move in together. To help Young secure a corporate job, Gyu-ho impersonates him for a required blood test to hide his health status. However, as time passes, the relationship becomes strained by domestic arguments, Young's focus on his writing, and a lack of intimacy. A trip to Bangkok fails to rekindle their passion. When Gyu-ho is offered a promotion in China, Young initially plans to join him but discovers his company requires an HIV test for international placement. Discouraged and wanting Gyu-ho to succeed, Young lies about his support and insists Gyu-ho go alone. The two share a bitter farewell at the airport, leaving Young to face his loneliness and the reality of his "Kylie" diagnosis alone.
| 7 8 | "A Vacation in the Late Rainy Season"; Transliteration: "Neujeun ugiui bakangseu" (Korean: 늦은 우기의 바캉스) | Kim Se-in | Sang Young Park | October 21, 2024 |
A year after parting with Gyu-ho, Young’s novel Love in the Big City becomes an international success. Despite his professional triumph, he remains haunted by his past. Hearing rumors of Gyu-ho's return to Seoul, Young matches with "Q" on a dating app. Noticing references to "Kylie Wilde", he hopes the stranger is Gyu-ho, but "Q" is revealed to be William Habibi, a Japanese man. William invites Young to Bangkok, where Young spends his time reminiscing about his previous trip with Gyu-ho. The vacation turns sour when Young discovers William is leading a double life with a partner and child. Realizing he was chasing nostalgia rather than a new connection, Young leaves William a letter and returns to Seoul. He moves out of his apartment, reflecting on his journey. Through his writing, Young acknowledges that while he documented his relationships to understand their failures, he still has much to learn about the complexities of love in the big city.

== Production ==
=== Development ===
The alumni association of the Korean Academy of Film Arts decided to make an adaptation of Sang Young Park's novel Love in the Big City to celebrate the fortieth anniversary of its foundation, entrusting the direction to its members Son Tae-gyum, Hur Jin-ho, Hong Ji-young, and Kim Se-in, and choosing Park himself to write the screenplay. Regarding the relay-style directing approach, director Hur Jin-ho commented, "We initially tried to create a sense of continuity, but it didn't work out as we hoped. In the end, we concluded that each had to survive on their own. Every time a new director stepped in, it essentially became a different character," explaining the independent nature of each segment's direction. Before converging on the serial production, the initial intention was to shoot a short film.

The announcement was made at the beginning of April 2023 by the production companies Merrychristmas and Bigstone Studio with the aim of publishing the drama on an OTT platform in 2024. The production was financially supported by the Ministry of Culture, Sports and Tourism, but in August 2023 the media reported that it was struggling to find investors due to the reticence of online platforms to pick up a series about sexual minorities, since three of the four stories deal directly with homosexuality and HIV.

Compared to the novel, the character of Jae-hee has been renamed to Mi-ae to differentiate her from that of the film adaptation. Furthermore, while maintaining the plot, the structure and developments differ from the original.

=== Casting and filming ===
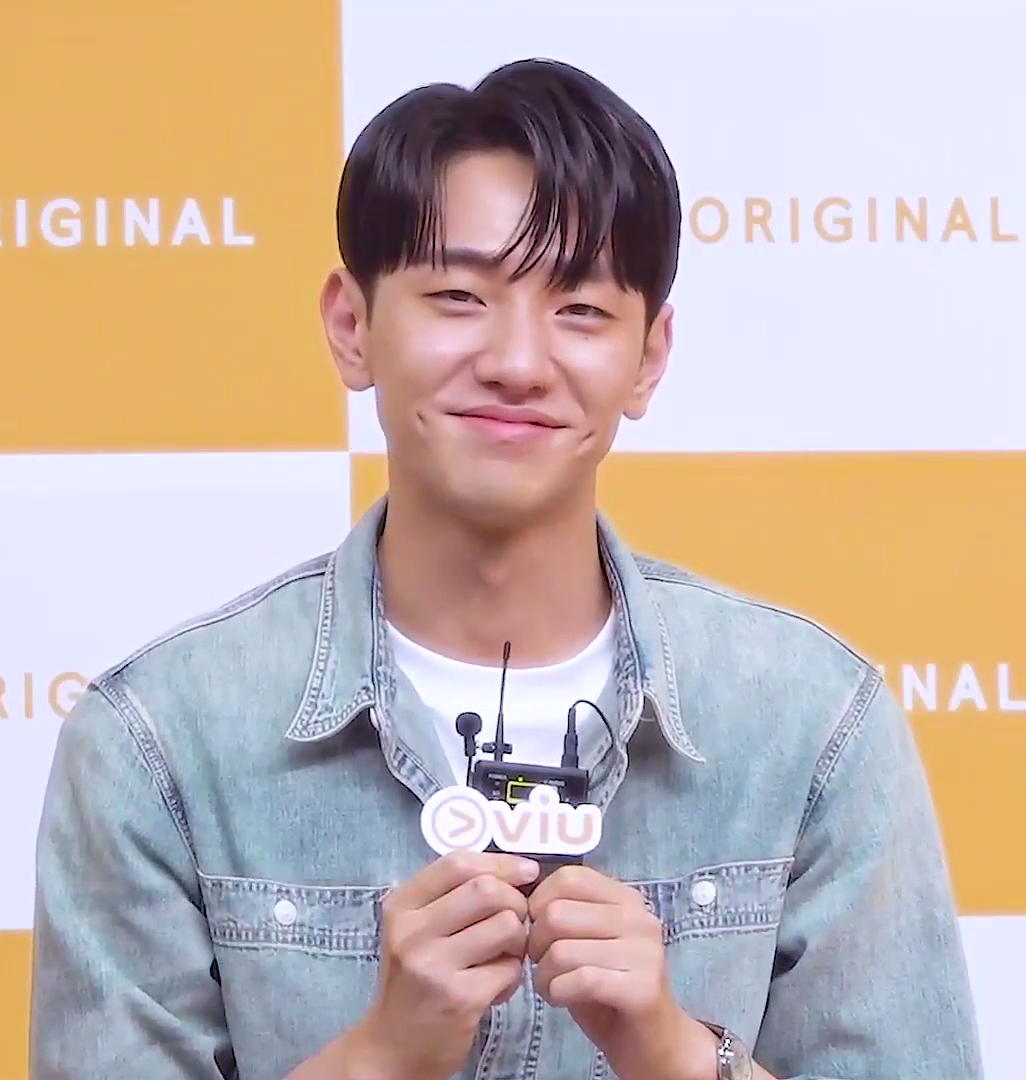
Nam Yoon-su plays the main character, Go Young

Long and unsuccessful auditions were held to cast the lead role, until the production company directly contacted actor Nam Yoon-su, who had expressed his interest in playing writer Go Young; on October 11, 2023, Agency Garten announced that he would have been part of the project. The main cast was later completed by Lee Soo-kyung, Oh Hyun-kyung, Kwon Hyuk, Na Hyun-woo, Jin Ho-eun, and Kim Won-joong. Both Kwon Hyuk and Na Hyun-woo were cast by the directors, respectively Son Tae-gyum and Hur Jin-ho (with whom Na had already worked in the drama Lost in 2021), while Jin Ho-eun was selected through audition out of 3,800 candidates.

Kwon said that several acquaintances had tried to dissuade him from taking on another gay role after the 2022 web series The New Employee, fearing that it would make his image static, but that he was convinced by the director's confidence and the quality of both the source material and the adaptation. Nam Yoon-su also stated that he had been the subject of similar concerns, but that he did not take them into account because it was a project he absolutely wanted to do.

Filming took place from November 2023 to February 2024, in several locations in Seoul, including Itaewon, Namsan, Jongno, and the Olympic Park, as well as in Bangkok, Thailand.

=== Music ===
Love in the Big City features one original song, "Erotic Joke" from Suran's single album Pastel, which was released on October 24, 2024 and serves as the soundtrack to episode 5. Inspired by the series, it was produced by Suran in collaboration with Bigstone Studio; Hong Ji-young, who directed episodes 5 and 6, is one of the lyricists.

== Release ==
Love in the Big City was scheduled to be released on an OTT platform in the second half of 2024. In August 2024, TVING confirmed that the series would premiere on its platform on October 21, 2024. On October 8, the series was confirmed to release all eight episode on its premiere date, instead of two episodes a week for four weeks, to capitalize on the drama's strengths as a film that blends various genres. It was also made available to stream on Viki.

== Reception ==
=== Critical response ===
Lee Da-won of Sports Kyunghyang wrote that Love in the Big City "shows the most honest love story of today's youth, who constantly love and lose in the big city that never sleeps". For Jung Yu-mi of Ize, it's an "excellent" series where "the charm of youth love stories and queer dramas really explodes." Choi Min-ji of Kyunghyang Shinmun took advantage of the almost simultaneous release of the film and the drama to compare them, writing "while the film lightly depicts the melancholy and wanderlust of youth and enriches the original with real-life problems faced by LGBTQ+ individuals and women, the TV series focuses on the love and growth of Go Young," who is the sole protagonist here. Kim Hyun-jin of Workers' Solidarity singled out episodes 3 and 4 as the best because of the many symbolic anecdotes about the oppression of sexual minorities, such as the fear of being discovered, self-hatred, or the experience of being abandoned by family. David Opie of Yahoo! News wrote that the story speaks to today's queer South Koreans, finally showing their experience of love in a "high-profile storytelling as accomplished and heartfelt as this" and that "that's infinitely more important than any talk of the controversy" that surrounded the series before its broadcast.

Nandini Iyengar of Bollywood Hungama praised Nam Yoon-su's and Jin Ho-eun's performances, calling the former "nothing short of exceptional" and the latter "equally impressive". She felt that it offered a touching look at the challenges faced by queer individuals in an urban and often conservative context like South Korea, and that it was engaging viewing for all audiences due to its wholesome and realistic tone, educating "those unfamiliar with these experiences while providing comfort to those who resonate with the themes presented." She concluded that it was a significant stride towards normalizing queer narratives in mainstream Korean media, paving the way for a more inclusive and diverse view, and that it offered a refreshing and authentic portrayal by challenging social norms and stereotypes through a sensitive and nuanced approach.

Several felt that the main reason for Love in the Big City's success was that it more realistically captured queer culture rather than portraying a romantic fantasy like many BL series.

=== Public response ===
On October 14, 2024, conservative groups in South Korea demanded that the Ministry of Culture, Sports and Tourism withdraw funding and started protesting to cancel the broadcast, stating that its "glamorization and promotion" of homosexuality would "significantly affect" children and arguing that it was necessary to prevent teenagers and young adults from viewing homosexual content to fight the spread of HIV. This is despite an age restriction imposed by South Korean laws on the series due to the display of sex, drugs, and self harm. The protests led to the removal of the trailers, which were made public again two days later. Another protest took place on October 21 in front of the offices of TVING and CJ Group. Actor Nam Yoon-su also stated that he received hate comments for accepting a gay role.

After its release, the series' title ranked first among the search keywords on TVING. Outside of Asia, Love in the Big City was distributed by Rakuten Viki, entering the top 5 of the most viewed programs in America, Europe and Oceania in the first week of its release, with an average rating of 9.6 out of 10. It received positive reviews from viewers, who praised the delicacy of the script, the direction and the acting, and the screenwriter and the actors received numerous private messages of gratitude from sexual minorities from all over the world.

The popularity of both the drama and the film, released a few weeks apart, increased the sales of the novel by 490% in October and November 2024 on the online portal Yes24, driven mainly by the 20–29 age group.

=== Listicles ===
Name of publisher, year listed, name of listicle, and placement
| Publisher | Year | Listicle | Placement | Ref. |
|---|---|---|---|---|
| Cine21 | 2024 | Top 10 Series of 2024 | 4th place | |
| Teen Vogue | 2024 | 13 Best BL Dramas of 2024 | Included | |
| Teen Vogue | 2024 | 13 Best K-Dramas of 2024 | Included | |
| Time Magazine | 2024 | The 10 Best K-Dramas of 2024 | 3rd place | |
| Teen Vogue | 2026 | 27 Best BL Dramas of All Time | Included | |
