= Cursed Bunny =

2022 short story collection by Bora Chung

Cursed Bunny: Stories
- Author: Chung Bora
- Translator: Anton Hur
- Language: English
- Genre: Speculative fiction
- Publisher: 아작
- Publication date: March 15, 2017
- ISBN: 9791166686665

Cursed Bunny is a 2017 short story collection by Chung Bora and translated by Anton Hur.

== Overview ==
Cursed Bunny consists of ten short stories, each an example of speculative fiction. The stories are:

1. "The Head"
2. "The Embodiment"
3. "Cursed Bunny"
4. "The Frozen Finger"
5. "Snare"
6. "Goodbye, My Love"
7. "Scars"
8. "Home Sweet Home"
9. "Ruler of the Winds and Sands"
10. "Reunion"

== Development history ==
=== Publication history ===
Cursed Bunny was originally published in South Korea on March 15, 2017. It was published in the United Kingdom by Honford Star on July 15, 2021. It was published in the United States by Algonquin Books on December 6, 2022.

== Reception ==
The New York Times Book Review praised both the diversity of the collection's stories and the translation, complimenting Anton Hur for capturing "the tricky magic of Chung's voice." The Chicago Review of Books was similarly positive, praising the stories for functioning as critiques of greed, sexism, and modernity. Reactor and ArtReview published similar reviews, positively noting the collection's themes and praising Hur's translation.

The San Francisco Chronicle positively described each story's concept and themes. The Los Angeles Times noted that some of the stories feel into genre conventions but noted that Chung's use of horror helped subvert expectations and praised her literary approach to writing. Kirkus Reviews described the stories as being both "bleak" and "wise and honest," while Booklist described the collection as being "irresistible." Shelf Awareness was also positive, noting that Chung's "gruesome" imagery was used for more than shock value and that the images helped illustrate the stories' anti-capitalist themes.

Upon its release in the United Kingdom, Cursed Bunny was shortlisted for the 2022 International Booker Prize. The award was ultimately given to Tomb of Sand by Geetanjali Shree. After being released in the United States, it was a finalist for the 2023 National Book Award for Translated Literature.
