= Baek Se-hee =

South Korean author (1990–2025)

- Born: 1990; Goyang, South Korea
- Died: 16 October 2025 (aged 35); Goyang, South Korea
- Education: Dongguk University
- Writing career
- Genre: Memoir
- Notable work: I Want to Die but I Want to Eat Tteokbokki

Korean name
- Hangul: 백세희
- RR: Baek Sehui
- MR: Paek Sehŭi

Baek Se-hee (Korean: 백세희; 1990 – 16 October 2025) was a South Korean author best known for her memoir, I Want to Die but I Want to Eat Tteokbokki (2018), and its sequel, I Want to Die but I Still Want to Eat Tteokbokki (2019). These works related details of her treatment for chronic depression and her conflicted thoughts about it and associated issues such as comfort eating, self-harm and suicide.

== Early life and education ==
Baek was the second of three sisters born into a humble background in Goyang in the Seoul metropolitan area. As a child, she witnessed her abusive father beat her mother. She studied creative writing at Dongguk University. She then worked as a social media director for a publishing company for five years.

== Therapy and writing ==
While working, she developed dysthymia (persistent depressive disorder). She underwent psychiatric therapy for a decade, writing about the experience on her blog. Someone with similar feelings commented on this and this inspired her:

When they said it was like a light was shining into the darkness of their life, I was so surprised ... All I'd done was be honest in public, but here was someone comforted by that.

In 2018, she published a memoir about her experiences with the condition and therapy. It was titled I Want to Die but I Want to Eat Tteokbokki, referencing her experience of still wanting to eat her favourite food, tteokbokki. Brian Duff explained the way in which her love of the food kept her going:

Se-hee is shy, introverted and fearful of being manipulated. She finds being with other people almost unbearable. But she savors eating Tteokbokki―a chewy, spicy rice cake―at the humble places that serve it. That one desire, by keeping alive the flickering flame of her will to keep going, drives her to show up for conversations with her therapist.

First self-published and then acquired by Munhakdongne, the book was quite successful: it sold over a million copies and was translated into 15 languages, including Anton Hur's English translation in 2022. A sequel, I Want to Die but I Still Want to Eat Tteokbokki, was published in 2019, with an English translation following in 2024. The sequel focused especially on the themes of self-harm and suicidal ideation.

== Death ==
Baek Se-hee died on 16 October 2025, at the age of 35, in a hospital in Goyang. Her death was confirmed by a spokesman for the Korea Organ Donation Agency, who said that her family did not want to state the cause of death. According to the Agency, her heart, lungs, liver and kidneys were donated.

== Publications ==
=== Memoirs ===
- I Want to Die but I Want to Eat Tteokbokki (2018; ISBN 978-1-5266-4809-9)
- I Want to Die but I Still Want to Eat Tteokbokki (2019; ISBN 978-1-5266-6365-8)

=== Short fiction ===
- "A Will from Barcelona" (2025)

=== As collaborator ===
- No One Will Ever Love You as Much as I Do (2021)
- I Want to Write, I Don't Want to Write (2022)

== See also ==
- Suicide in South Korea
