= Varnæs Parish =

Parish in Aabenraa Municipality, Denmark

Varnæs Parish Varnæs Sogn
- Parish
- The parish within Aabenraa Municipality
- Coordinates: 55°0'50"N, 9°34'7"E
- Country: Denmark
- Region: Southern Denmark
- Municipality: Aabenraa Municipality
- Diocese: Haderslev

Population (2025)
  - Total: 1,246
- Parish number: 9021

Varnæs Parish (Danish: Varnæs Sogn) is a parish in the Diocese of Haderslev in Aabenraa Municipality, Denmark.
