= Song Jong-hee =

South Korean make-up artist (born 1969)

- Born: 1969 (age 56–57); South Korea
- Education: Vancouver Film School
- Occupation: Make-up artist
- Years active: 1995 to present

Korean name
- Hangul: 송종희
- RR: Song Jonghui
- MR: Song Chonghŭi

Song Jong-hee (Korean: 송종희; born 1969) is a South Korean makeup artist, as well as CEO and co-founder of the film makeup studio Mimos. Starting her professional career with her 1996 debut in Kill the Love, she stood out from many of her peers by engaging early in pre-production to shape characters and offer screenplay input. She is known for her work in films A Muse and My Dictator, which earned her nominations for the Best Technical Award at the Blue Dragon Film Awards in 2012 and 2014, respectively.

Widely recognized as a frequent collaborator of Park Chan-wook, she has worked with him since Joint Security Area (2000), with credits including Oldboy (2003), Lady Vengeance (2005), The Handmaiden (2016), Decision to Leave (2022), and No Other Choice (2025). She has also partnered with other acclaimed directors such as Bong Joon Ho, Kim Jee-woon, Lee Chang-dong, Hur Jin-ho, and Um Tae-hwa.

== Career ==
=== 1995 to 1999: Beginning as makeup artist ===
In her mid-twenties, Song left her job and secretly enrolled in an art academy to study for college entrance exams. Her life took an unexpected turn on a day she skipped her classes to visit Sinchon with a friend who was modeling for a single day. Captivated by the makeup artist's technique, she tagged along for the next three sessions, realizing that a human face could truly serve as a canvas.

Diving into the professional makeup world, she trained for three months before entering the field. From video shoots and theater productions to bridal styling, fashion layouts, and print advertising, she experienced every corner of the industry. Even so, she felt disconnected from commercial beauty work focused on producing identical, cookie-cutter looks with heavy eye makeup and flushed cheeks. With so many talented artists already doing that work, she doubted her talent.

Everything changed in 1995 when she stepped onto her first movie set, joining Director Lee Myung-se's team for Affliction of Man. Receiving the storyboard for the first time, she saw every corner densely packed with notes the director had written while agonizing over it all night. It felt like a door opened, as if he was reaching out a hand saying, "Come in here and think it over with me; please help me." Working there, she realized she loved dressing actors as characters and working closely with people, finally experiencing a true sense of accomplishment.

In 1996, she debuted as a lead makeup artist on Lim Jong-jae's Kill the Love. During her next project, the 1997 film The Contact, she spent breaks chatting endlessly with lead actors Han Suk-kyu and Jeon Do-yeon over the script. Brainstorming together before the era of smartphones sparked a constant stream of new ideas. She loved collaborating to analyze character emotions, imagine expressions, and refine the look to help the actors' performances shine.

=== 2000 to 2008: Career breakthrough ===
Song first work Park Chan-wook in Joint Security Area (2000). She received technical award for her work at 2001 Women Filmmakers' Night - Woman Filmmaker of the Year Awards Ceremony. She subsequently worked with Park's other films. Most notably the neo-noir thrillers of The Vengeance Trilogy (Sympathy for Mr. Vengeance, Oldboy, and Lady Vengeance). Song spent five hours crafting Oh Dae-su's (Choi Min-sik) wild, explosion-surviving hair in Park Chan-wook's Old Boy (2003) to symbolize his pent-up wrath and captivity-driven desire for retribution. Song Jong-hee crafted Geum-ja's (Lee Young-ae) iconic look in Park Chan-wook's Sympathy for Lady Vengeance (2005) with flowing dark hair and crimson-fading smoky eyes. This striking aesthetic captured her contradictory emotions of vengeance and grief, portraying her complex inner turmoil as she executed her plan.

=== 2009 to present: Career after Vancouver Film School and establishment of Mimos ===
In 2009, she attended the Vancouver Film School. During her study, she traveled to Seattle, USA, in her spare time, to work on Director Kim Tae-yong's Late Autumn.

After returning from her study in 2011, Song partnered with Jang Ju-eun and Lee Yu-sun to launch the film make-up and hairdressing studio Mimos. Her first major project after that was director Jung Ji-woo's A Muse, for which Jung recruited her while she was still studying special effects makeup at the Vancouver Film School. Although Song initially thought the director's vision of aging the young actor Park Hae-il was a crazy challenge, she was persuaded by his goal to create an intelligent, unconventional elderly character and joined the production.

To prepare, Song spent three weeks studying real elderly individuals at Tapgol Park in Jongno, observing their postures, gaits, and unique facial features to distinguish subtle differences across age groups. Reflecting on her research, she shared a poignant conversation with an elderly acquaintance who revealed that the hardest part of aging is becoming invisible to society. Her source explained that losing the casual attention of others creates a profound sense of isolation, capturing the emotional depth Song aimed to bring to the film's makeup design.

To commemorate her 30th career anniversary, Song and Mimos are hosting an exhibition titled "Song Jong-hee's 30 Years of Film Makeup: A Record of Time Built on Repetition and Restraint" at Yeonhee Gallery, located at 706-5 Yeonhee-dong, Seodaemun-gu, Seoul, from June 20, 2026, to August 9, 2026.

== Filmography ==
=== Films ===
Films credit
Year	Title		Director	Credited as	Ref
Year	English	Korean	Director	Credited as	Ref
1995	Affliction of Man	남자는 괴로워	Lee Myung-se	Makeup/Hair Team	
1995	Go Alone Like Musso's Horn	무소의 뿔처럼 혼자서 가라	Oh Byung-chul	Makeup/Hair Team	
1996	Kill the Love	그들만의 세상	Lim Jong-jae	Makeup/Hair	
1997	Connection	접속	Jang Yun-hyeon	Makeup/Hair	
1998	If the Sun Rises in the West	해가 서쪽에서 뜬다면	Lee Eun	Makeup/Hair	
1999	Happy End	해피엔드	Jung Ji-woo	Makeup/Hair	
2000	Joint Security Area	공동경비구역 J.S.A	Park Chan-wook	Makeup/Hair	
2000	I Wish I Had a Wife	나도 아내가 있었으면 좋겠다	Park Heung-sik	Makeup/Hair	
2001	One Fine Spring Day	봄날은 간다	Hur Jin-ho	Makeup/Hair	
2002	YMCA Baseball Team	YMCA 야구단	Kim Hyun-seok	Makeup/Hair	
2002	Sympathy for Mr. Vengeance	복수는 나의 것	Park Chan-wook	Makeup/Hair	
2002	Bus, Stop	버스, 정류장	Lee Mi-yeon	Makeup/Hair	
2003	Family Affairs	바람난 가족	Im Sang-soo	Makeup/Hair	
2003	Memories of Murder	살인의 추억	Bong Joon-ho	Makeup/Hair	
2003	Oldboy	올드보이	Park Chan-wook	Makeup/Hair	
2004	The Little Mermaid	얼굴없는 미녀	Park Heung-sik	Makeup/Hair	
2004	Faceless Beauty	인어공주	Kim In-sik	Makeup/Hair	
2004	The President's Barber	효자동 이발사	Im Chan-sang	Makeup/Hair Support	
2005	Hello, Big Brother	안녕, 형아	Im Tae-hyung	Makeup/Hair	
2005	Lady Vengeance	친절한 금자씨	Park Chan-wook	Makeup/Hair	
2006	200 Pounds Beauty	미녀는 괴로워	Kim Yong-hwa	Makeup/Hair	
2006	The Host	괴물	Bong Joon-ho	Makeup/Hair	
2006	Like a Virgin	미녀는 괴로워	Lee Hae-jun, Lee Hae-young	Makeup/Hair	
2006	No Regret	후회하지 않아	Lee Song-hee-il	Makeup/Hair	
2007	Fantastic Parasuicides	판타스틱 자살 소동	Park So-young	Makeup/Hair	
2008	Go Go 70s	고고70	Choi Ho	Makeup/Hair	
2008	Crush and Blush	미쓰 홍당무	Lee Kyoung-mi	Makeup/Hair	
2008	Modern Boy	모던 보이	Jung Ji-woo	Makeup/Hair Support	
2008	Secret Sunshine	밀양	Lee Chang-dong	Makeup/Hair Support	
2009	Thirst	박쥐	Park Chan-wook	Makeup/Hair	
2009	Castaway on the Moon	김씨표류기	Lee Hae-jun	Makeup/Hair	
2011	Late Autumn	만추	Kim Tae-yong	Makeup/Hair	
2012	A Muse	은교	Jung Ji-woo	Makeup/Hair	
2013	Days of Wrath	잉투기	Shin Jai-ho	Makeup/Hair	
2013	Ingtoogi: The Battle of Internet Trolls	잉투기	Um Tae-hwa	Makeup/Hair	
2013	Way Back Home	집으로 가는 길	Bang Eun-jin	Makeup/Hair	
2014	My Dictator	나의 독재자	Lee Hae-jun	Makeup/Hair	
2014	Big Match	빅매치	Choi Ho	Makeup/Hair	
2015	Coin Locker Girl	차이나타운	Han Jun-hee	Makeup/Hair	
2015	4th Place	4등	Jung Ji-woo	Makeup/Hair	
2015	The Advocate: A Missing Body	성난 변호사	Hur Jin-ho	Special effects makeup	
2016	The Handmaiden	아가씨	Park Chan-wook	Makeup/Hair	
2016	Vanishing Time: A Boy Who Returned	가려진 시간	Um Tae-hwa	Makeup/Hair	
2016	Familyhood	굿바이 싱글	Kim Tae-gon	Special effects makeup	
2017	Memoir of a Murderer	살인자의 기억법	Won Shin-yun	Makeup concept design	
2017	Forgotten	기억의 밤	Jang Hang-jun	Special effects makeup	
2017	Heart Blackened	침묵	Jung Ji-woo	Makeup/Hair	
2017	A Single Rider	싱글라이더	Lee Joo-young	Makeup/Hair	
2017	Method	메소드	Bang Eun-jin	special props	
2018	Illang: The Wolf Brigade	인랑	Kim Jee-woon	Makeup/Hair	
2019	The Day I Died: Unclosed Case	내가 죽던 날	Park Ji-wan	Makeup Team B	
2019	Bring Me Home	나를 찾아줘	Kim Seung-woo	Makeup/Hair	
2019	The Battle: Roar to Victory	봉오동 전투	Won Shin-yun	Makeup/Hair	
2022	Decision to Leave	헤어질 결심	Park Chan-wook	Makeup/Hair	
2023	Concrete Utopia	콘크리트 유토피아	Um Tae-hwa	Makeup/Hair	
2023	Rebound	리바운드	Jang Hang-jun	Special effects makeup	
2024	Wonderland	원더랜드	Kim Tae-yong	Makeup/Hair	
2024	Love in the Big City	대도시의 사랑법	E.oni	Makeup/Hair	
2025	No Other Choice	어쩔수가없다	Park Chan-wook	Makeup/Hair	
2026	The King's Warden	왕과 사는 남자	Jang Hang-jun	Makeup/Hair	
2026	Pavane	파반느	Lee Jong-pil	Makeup/Hair	

=== Short films ===
Shorts' credit
Year	Title		Director	Credited for	Notes	Ref.
Year	English	Korean	Director	Credited for	Notes	Ref.
2003	If You Were Me	여섯개의 시선	Park Chan-wook	Makeup/Hair	Omnibus film	
2012	Footsteps	발걸음	Kim Hyung-kyun	Makeup/Hair		
2012	Day Trip	청출어람	PARKing CHANce	Makeup/Hair		
2018	Believe it or not	반신반의	PARKing CHANce	Makeup/Hair		
2022	Life Is But a Dream	일장춘몽	Park Chan-wook	for Apple Inc.		

=== Series ===
Series' credit
Year	Title		Network	Director	Role	Ref.
Year	English	Korean	Network	Director	Role	Ref.
2020	The School Nurse Files	보건교사 안은영	Netflix	Lee Kyoung-mi	Makeup/Hair	
2022	Somebody	썸바디	Netflix	Jung Ji-woo	Makeup/Hair	
2023	Mask Girl	마스크걸	Netflix	Kim Young-hoon	Makeup/Hair	
2026	Can This Love Be Translated?	이 사랑 통역 되나요?	Netflix	Yoo Young-eun	Makeup/Hair	

== Accolades ==
=== Awards and nominations ===
Awards and nominations received by Song
Award	Year	Category	Recipient	Result	Ref.
Blue Dragon Film Awards	2012	Technical Award	A Muse	Nominated	
Blue Dragon Film Awards	2014	Technical Award	My Dictator	Nominated	
International Makeup Artist Trade Show	2011	Best Makeup Artist	Song Jong-hee	Won	
Woman in Film Korea Festival	2001	Woman Filmmaker of the Year Award	I Wish I Had a Wife; One Fine Spring Day; Joint Security Area	Nominated	
Woman in Film Korea Festival	2001	Technical award	I Wish I Had a Wife; One Fine Spring Day; Joint Security Area	Won	

=== Listicles ===
Name of publisher, year listed, name of listicle, and placement
Publisher	Year	Listicle	Placement	Ref.
Hankook Ilbo	2024	A veteran's edge	Shortlisted	

== See also ==
- Prosthetic make-up effects
