= List of awards and nominations received by Kim Go-eun =

Kim Go-eun awards and nominations
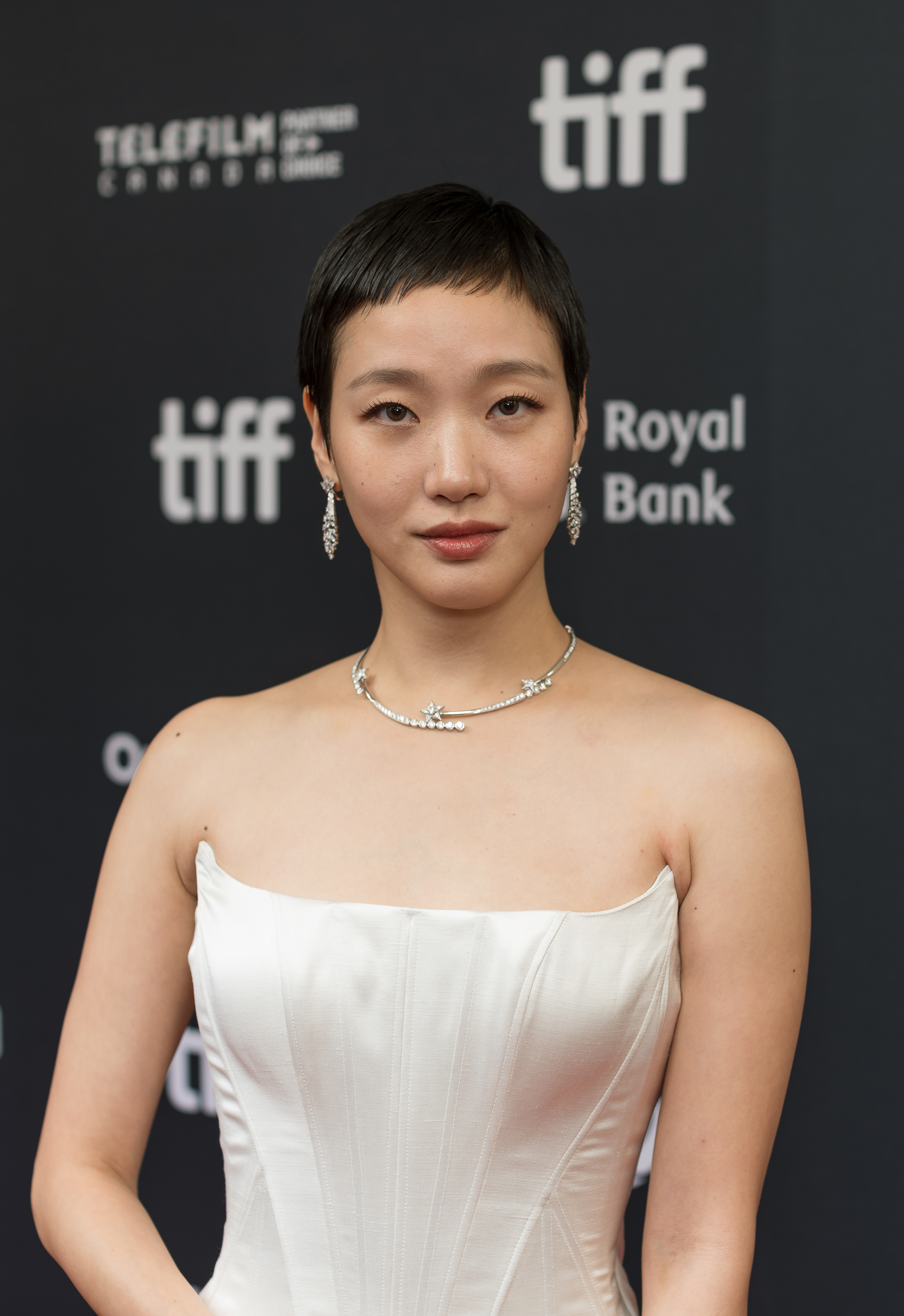
- Kim at the 2024 Toronto International Film Festival
Awards and nominations
Award	Wins	Nominations
APAN Star Awards	0	5
Asia Artist Awards	0	1
Asian Film Awards	0	1
Baeksang Arts Awards	2	6
Beautiful Artist Awards	1	1
Bechdel Day	1	1
Blue Dragon Film Awards	2	2
Blue Dragon Series Awards	2	3
Brand of the Year Awards	1	1
Bucheon International Fantastic Film Festival	2	2
Buil Film Awards	2	4
Busan Film Critics Awards	1	1
Busan International Film Festival	1	1
Chunsa Film Art Awards	1	2
Cine21 Film Awards	2	2
Director's Cut Awards	1	3
DramaFever Awards	1	1
First Brand Awards	1	1
Grand Bell Awards	1	2
Jecheon International Music & Film Festival	1	1
Kinolights Awards	1	1
KOFRA Film Awards	1	1
Korea Drama Awards	0	2
Korean Association of Film Critics Awards	1	1
Korean Film Actors' Guild Awards	1	1
Korean Film Producers Association Awards	1	1
Korea Youth Film Festival	1	1
Marie Claire Film Festival	1	1
New York Asian Film Festival	1	1
SBS Drama Awards	0	2
Seoul International Drama Awards	0	1
Style Icon Asia	1	1
Women in Film of the Year Awards	1	1

Totals (Note: Certain award groups do not simply award one winner. They acknowledge several different recipients, have runners-up, and have third place. Since this is a specific recognition and is different from losing an award, runner-up mentions are considered wins in this award tally. For simplification and to avoid errors, each award in this list has been presumed to have had a prior nomination.)
- Wins: 35
- Nominations: 58

Kim Go-eun (Korean: 김고은) is a highly acclaimed South Korean actress recognized for her versatile performances, most notably receiving the Grand Prize (Daesang) at the Blue Dragon Series Awards. Across her career, Kim has received numerous competitive awards and nominations for her work in film and television.

Her debut feature film role in Eungyo (2012) brought her early recognition from major domestic film organizations, including the Blue Dragon Film Award and the Grand Bell Award for Best New Actress, alongside several critics' association honors. These initial accolades established her presence in the South Korean film industry and led to subsequent casting opportunities in both cinema and broadcast media.

Kim has continued to receive recognition for her film roles, including a Blue Dragon Film Award and a Baeksang Arts Award for Best Actress for her performance in the supernatural thriller Exhuma (2024). Her work in other theatrical releases, such as Coin Locker Girl (2015) and Love in the Big City (2024), has yielded additional wins and nominations from entities such as the Buil Film Awards, the Director's Cut Awards, and the Cine21 Film Awards.

Transitioning into television, Kim earned recognition across various networks and streaming platforms. She received the Baeksang Arts Award for Best New Actress – Television for her performance in Cheese in the Trap (2016), followed by nominations for roles in series such as Guardian: The Lonely and Great God (2016) and The King: Eternal Monarch (2020). Her work in streaming content also garnered industry notice, including a Best Actress win at the Blue Dragon Series Awards for Yumi's Cells (2022) and the Grand Prize at the same ceremony for You and Everything Else.

== Awards and nominations ==
Name of the award ceremony, year presented, category, nominee of the award, and the result of the nomination
Award ceremony	Year	Category	Nominee / Work	Result	Ref.
APAN Star Awards	2016	Best New Actress	Cheese in the Trap	Nominated	
APAN Star Awards	2021	Popular Star Award, Actress	The King: Eternal Monarch	Nominated	
APAN Star Awards	2022	Best Couple	Kim Go-eun (with Park Ji-young); Yumi's Cells	Nominated	
APAN Star Awards	2022	Popularity Star Award, Actress	Yumi's Cells	Nominated	
APAN Star Awards	2022	Top Excellence Award, Actress in an OTT Drama	Yumi's Cells	Nominated	
Asia Artist Awards	2026	Popularity Award – Actress	Kim Go-eun	Pending	
Asian Film Awards	2025	Best Actress	Exhuma	Nominated	
Baeksang Arts Awards	2013	Best New Actress – Film	Eungyo	Nominated	
Baeksang Arts Awards	2016	Best New Actress – Television	Cheese in the Trap	Won	
Baeksang Arts Awards	2017	Best Actress – Television	Guardian: The Lonely and Great God	Nominated	
Baeksang Arts Awards	2024	Best Actress – Film	Exhuma	Won	
Baeksang Arts Awards	2025	Best Actress – Film	Love in the Big City	Nominated	
Baeksang Arts Awards	2026	Best Actress – Television	You and Everything Else	Nominated	
Beautiful Artist Awards (Shin Young-kyun Arts and Culture Foundation)	2012	New Artist Award	Eungyo	Won	
Bechdel Day	2026	Bechdelian in series — Actresses of the Year	Kim Go-eun	Won	
Blue Dragon Film Awards	2012	Best New Actress	Eungyo	Won	
Blue Dragon Film Awards	2024	Best Actress	Exhuma	Won	
Blue Dragon Series Awards	2022	Best Actress	Yumi's Cells	Won	
Blue Dragon Series Awards	2026	Grand Prize	You and Everything Else	Won	
Blue Dragon Series Awards	2026	Best Actress	You and Everything Else	Nominated	
Brand of the Year Awards	2024	Best Actress Movie	Exhuma	Won	
Bucheon International Fantastic Film Festival	2015	Fantasia Award	Coin Locker Girl	Won	
Bucheon International Fantastic Film Festival	2015	Jury's Choice Award Special Mention	Coin Locker Girl	Won	
Buil Film Awards	2012	Best New Actress	Eungyo	Won	
Buil Film Awards	2015	Best Actress	Coin Locker Girl	Nominated	
Buil Film Awards	2024	Best Actress	Exhuma	Nominated	
Buil Film Awards	2025	Best Actress	Love in the Big City	Won	
Busan Film Critics Awards	2012	Best New Actress	Eungyo	Won	
Busan International Film Festival with Marie Claire Asia Star Awards	2023	Marie Claire Award	Hero	Won	
Chunsa Film Art Awards	2020	Best Actress	Tune in for Love	Nominated	
Chunsa Film Art Awards	2025	Best Acting in OTT	The Price of Confession	Won	
Cine21 Film Awards	2012	Best New Actress	Eungyo	Won	
Cine21 Film Awards	2024	Best Actress	Exhuma and Love in the Big City	Won	
Director's Cut Awards	2023	Best Actress (Film)	Hero	Nominated	
Director's Cut Awards	2025	Best Actress (Film)	Exhuma	Won	
Director's Cut Awards	2025	Best Actress (Film)	Love in the Big City	Nominated	
DramaFever Awards	2017	Best Couple	Kim Go-eun (with Gong Yoo); Guardian: The Lonely and Great God	Won	
First Brand Awards	2025	Best Actress (Film)	Exhuma	Won	
Grand Bell Awards	2012	Best New Actress	Eungyo	Won	
Grand Bell Awards	2012	Best Actress	Eungyo	Nominated	
Jecheon International Music & Film Festival	2012	Moët Rising Star Award	Eungyo	Won	
Kinolights Awards	2022	Actress of The Year (Domestic)	Little Women	4th	
KOFRA Film Awards	2013	Best New Actress	Eungyo	Won	
Korea Drama Awards	2016	Best New Actress	Cheese in the Trap	Nominated	
Korea Drama Awards	2017	Top Excellence Award, Actress	Guardian: The Lonely and Great God	Nominated	
Korea Youth Film Festival	2016	Favorite Rookie Actor	The Advocate: A Missing Body	Won	
Korean Association of Film Critics awards	2012	Best New Actress	Eungyo	Won	
Korean Film Actors' Guild Awards	2015	Popularity Award	Coin Locker Girl	Won	
Korean Film Producers Association Awards	2024	Best Actress	Exhuma	Won	
Marie Claire Film Festival	2024	Pioneer Award	Exhuma	Won	
New York Asian Film Festival	2013	Star Asia Rising Star Award	Eungyo	Won	
SBS Drama Awards	2020	Best Couple	Kim Go-eun (with Lee Min-ho); The King: Eternal Monarch	Nominated	
SBS Drama Awards	2020	Top Excellence Award, Actress in a Miniseries Fantasy/Romance Drama	The King: Eternal Monarch	Nominated	
Seoul International Drama Awards	2026	Best Actress	You and Everything Else	Nominated	
Style Icon Asia	2016	Amazing Rising Star	Kim Go-eun	Won	
Women in Film of the Year Awards	2024	Best Actress	Exhuma and Love in the Big City	Won	

== Listicles ==
Name of publisher, year listed, name of listicle, and placement
Publisher	Year	Listicle	Placement	Ref.
Asia Brand Research Institute	2024	Film Actor of the Year	3rd	
Cine21	2024	"Korean Film NEXT 50" – Actors	Included	
Elle Japan	2022	Top 16 Hallyu Best Actress	1st	
Forbes Korea	2017	Power Celebrity 40	36th	
Gallup Korea	2022	Television Actor of the Year	9th	
Gallup Korea	2024	Film Actor of the Year	3rd	
Gallup Korea	2025	Film Actor of the Year	8th	
Gallup Korea	2024	Favorite Korean Film Actors	8th	
Gallup Korea	2024	Favorite Korean Television Actors	10th	
Korean Film Council	2021	Korean Actors 200 (Note: Introduces 200 actors that best represent the present and future of Korean cinema to the people in the film industry all over the world.)	Included	
Star News (Note: Star News commissions Gallup Korea for the survey)	2024	Best Television Couple of the Past Decade (Note: With Gong Yoo for Guardian: The Lonely and Great God (2016))	2nd	
