= Jung Hae-in =

South Korean actor (born 1988)

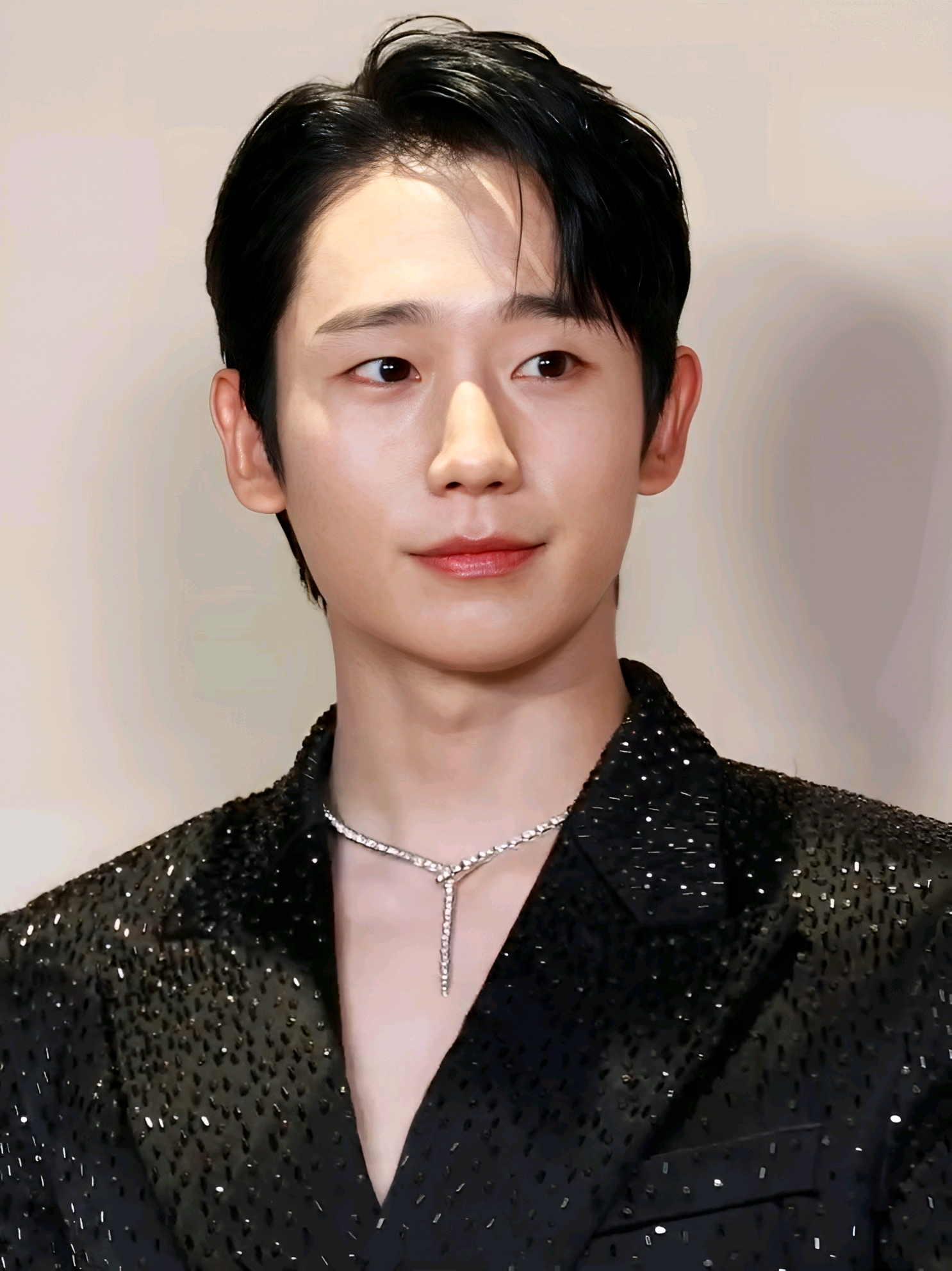
- Jung in 2025
- Born: April 1, 1988 (age 38); Seoul, South Korea
- Education: Pyeongtaek University
- Occupations: Actor; model
- Years active: 2013–present
- Agent: FNC Entertainment
- Height: 178 cm (5 ft 10 in)

Korean name
- Hangul: 정해인
- RR: Jeong Haein
- MR: Chŏng Haein
- Website: fncent.com

Jung Hae-in (Korean: 정해인; born April 1, 1988) is a South Korean actor. Jung first gained recognition with supporting roles in the television dramas While You Were Sleeping (2017) and Prison Playbook (2017–2018). He has since starred in Something in the Rain (2018), One Spring Night (2019), D.P. (2021–2023), Snowdrop (2021–2022), Love Next Door (2024) and Our Sticky Love (2026). Jung has also starred in the films Tune in for Love (2019), Start-Up (2019), and I, the Executioner (2024).

== Career ==
=== Beginnings ===
Jung's first acting experience was in a college musical; however, his determination to become an actor was established during his military service. He debuted at the age of 26.

Jung officially debuted in 2014 through the TV series Bride of the Century and then appeared in the indie film The Youth. The same year, he was cast in the historical series The Three Musketeers. He then appeared in small roles and made several cameo appearances for various television series and films from 2014 to 2016, including in Guardian: The Lonely and Great God as Kim Go-eun's first love.

=== 2017–present: Rising popularity and leading roles ===
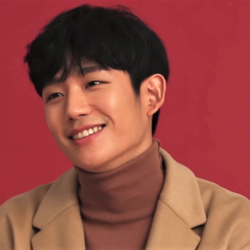
Jung in November 2017

In 2017, Jung gained popularity with his performance in the fantasy romance While You Were Sleeping. His named was ranked as the number-one search on Korean portal site Naver. Two of his historical movies, The King's Case Note and Conspiracy: Age of Rebellion, were released in the same year. He was next cast in the comedy series Prison Playbook, receiving praise for his performance as an Army captain convicted of assaulting a soldier in his unit who later died.

In 2018, Jung appeared in another historical film, Heung-boo: The Revolutionist, playing the character of Heonjong of Joseon. He landed his first leading role in the romance drama Something in the Rain alongside Son Ye-jin. Following the airing of the drama, Jung experienced a rise in popularity in Asia. Later that year, Jung was cast in the period romance film Tune in for Love alongside Kim Go-eun.

In 2019, Jung starred in the youth film Start-Up as a school dropout who ends up in a gang. The same year he was cast in the romance drama One Spring Night alongside Han Ji-min, helmed by the director and writer of Something in the Rain.

In 2020, Jung starred in romance drama A Piece of Your Mind alongside Chae Soo-bin. In the same year, he joined on JTBC drama Snowdrop alongside Jisoo; the film premiered in December 2021.

In 2021, Jung starred in the Netflix series D.P. as a Military Police soldier tasked with pursuing deserters. The same year he joined the Watcha original short film Unframed, with Lee Je-hoon directing and writing the script.

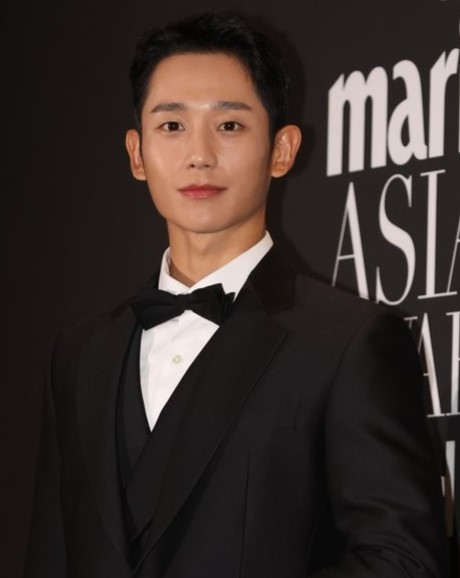
Jung during Marie Claire Asia Star Awards in October 2022

In 2022, Jung starred in the Disney+ drama Connect. He later reprised his role in the second season of D.P in 2023. In 2024, he starred in the romantic comedy Love Next Door with Jung So-min.

== Endorsements ==
Jung has been serving as an advertising model for Mind Bridge's business casual product line since 2019. In 2025, he became a global ambassador for Dolce & Gabbana. That same year, he also became an advertising model for Kyobo Life Insurance's campaign.

== Personal life ==
=== Family and education ===
Jung Hae-in's third great-grandfather is Chŏng Yagyong, a great thinker of the later Joseon period. He graduated with a degree in Broadcasting Entertainment at Pyeongtaek University, where he participated in various activities including musical plays.

=== Military enlistment ===
He enlisted in the military when he was 21 years old. He signed a contract with his agency after being discharged from the military and graduated from college.

== Filmography ==
=== Film ===
Year	Title	Role	Notes	Ref.
2014	The Youth	Park Man-jae		
2015	Salut D'Amour	young Kim Sung-chil		
2016	The Moon of Seoul	Ji Pyung	Short film	
2017	The King's Case Note	Heuk-woon		
2017	Conspiracy: Age of Rebellion	Kim Ho		
2018	Heung-boo: The Revolutionist	King Heonjong		
2019	Tune in for Love	Cha Hyeon-woo		
2019	Start-Up	Woo Sang-pil		
2020	P1H: The Beginning of a New World	Han	Cameo	
2021	Unframed – Blue happiness	Park Chae-young	Short film	
2023	12.12: The Day	Major Oh Jin-ho	Cameo	
2024	I, the Executioner	Park Seon-woo		

=== Television series ===
Key
†	Denotes television productions that have not yet been released

Year	Title	Role	Notes	Ref.
2014	Bride of the Century	Choi Kang-in		
2014	The Three Musketeers	Ahn Min-seo		
2015	Blood	Joo Hyun-woo		
2015	Reply 1988	Kim Ho-young	Cameo (ep. 13)	
2016	Yeah, That's How It Is	Yoo Se-joon		
2016	Guardian: The Lonely and Great God	Choi Tae-hee	Cameo (eps. 7–8)	
2016–2017	Night Light	Tak		
2017	While You Were Sleeping	Han Woo-tak		
2017–2018	Prison Playbook	Captain Yoo Jeong-woo		
2018	Something in the Rain	Seo Joon-hee		
2019	One Spring Night	Yoo Ji-ho		
2020	A Piece of Your Mind	Moon Ha-won		
2021–2023	D.P.	Ahn Jun-ho	Season 1–2	
2021–2022	Snowdrop	Lim Soo-ho		
2022	Connect	Ha Dong-soo		
2024	Love Next Door	Choi Seung-hyo		
2026	Our Sticky Love	Jang Tae-ha		

=== Television shows ===
Year	Title	Role	Ref.
2019–2020	Jung Hae-in's Travel Log	Himself	

=== Hosting ===
Year	Title	Notes	Ref.
2022	4th Asia Contents Awards	with Miss Korea 2019 Kim Sae-yeon	

== Discography ==
=== Singles ===
Title	Year	Album	Ref.
"My Song" (나의 노래)	2022	Connect OST	
"The Truth" (꺼내지 못한 말)	2024	Love Next Door OST	
"Begin Again" (그대 내게 다시)	2026	Our Sticky Love OST	

== Accolades ==
=== Awards and nominations ===
Name of the award ceremony, year presented, category, nominee of the award, and the result of the nomination
Award ceremony	Year	Category	Nominee / Work	Result	Ref.
APAN Star Awards	2018	Excellence Award, Actor in a Miniseries	Something in the Rain	Won	
APAN Star Awards	2018	K-Star Award, Actor	Something in the Rain	Won	
APAN Star Awards	2022	Top Excellence Award, Actor in an OTT Drama	D.P.	Won	
Asia Artist Awards	2018	Artist of the Year	Jung Hae-in	Won	
Asia Artist Awards	2018	Asia Talent	Jung Hae-in	Won	
Asia Artist Awards	2018	Best Emotive	Jung Hae-in	Won	
Asia Artist Awards	2019	Best Icon	Jung Hae-in	Won	
Asia Artist Awards	2019	AAA Potential (Actor)	Jung Hae-in	Won	
Asia Artist Awards	2026	Popularity Award – Actor	Jung Hae-in	Pending	
Asian Academy Creative Awards	2022	Best Actor in a Leading Role	D.P.	Won	
Baeksang Arts Awards	2018	Most Popular Actor	Prison Playbook	Won	
Baeksang Arts Awards	2020	Best New Actor – Film	Tune in for Love	Nominated	
Baeksang Arts Awards	2022	Best Actor – Television	D.P.	Nominated	
Baeksang Arts Awards	2025	Best Supporting Actor – Film	I, the Executioner	Nominated	
Blue Dragon Film Awards	2019	Best New Actor	Tune in for Love	Nominated	
Blue Dragon Film Awards	2024	Best Supporting Actor	I, the Executioner	Won	
Blue Dragon Film Awards	2024	Popular Star Award	I, the Executioner	Won	
Blue Dragon Series Awards	2022	Best Leading Actor	D.P.	Nominated	
Blue Dragon Series Awards	2022	Popular Star Award	D.P.	Won	
Buil Film Awards	2020	Best New Actor	Tune in for Love	Nominated	
Buil Film Awards	2025	Best Supporting Actor	I, the Executioner	Nominated	
Chunsa Film Art Awards	2020	Best New Actor	Tune in for Love	Nominated	
Cine21 Film Awards	2019	Best New Actor	Tune in for Love; Start-Up	Won	
Director's Cut Awards	2022	Best Actor in a Series	D.P.	Nominated	
Director's Cut Awards	2024	Best Actor in a Series	D.P. 2	Nominated	
Grand Bell Awards	2020	Best New Actor	Tune in for Love	Won	
Grand Bell Awards	2023	Best Actor in a Series	D.P.	Nominated	
London East Asia Film Festival	2019	Popularity Award	Tune in for Love	Won	
MBC Drama Awards	2019	Grand Prize	One Spring Night	Nominated	
MBC Drama Awards	2019	Top Excellence Award, Actor in a Wednesday-Thursday Drama	One Spring Night	Won	
SBS Drama Awards	2016	New Star Award	That's The Way It Is	Won	
SBS Drama Awards	2017	Excellence Award, Actor in a Wednesday–Thursday Drama	While You Were Sleeping	Nominated	
The Seoul Awards	2018	Best New Actor (Drama)	Something in the Rain	Nominated	
The Seoul Awards	2018	Popularity Award (Drama)	Something in the Rain	Won	
The Seoul Awards	2018	Hallyu Artist Award	Something in the Rain	Won	

=== State honors ===
Name of country or organization, year given, and name of honor
Country or organization	Year	Honor	Ref.
South Korea (Note: Honors are given at the Korean Popular Culture and Arts Awards, arranged by the Korea Creative Content Agency and hosted by the Ministry of Culture, Sports and Tourism. They are awarded to those who have contributed to the arts and South Korea's pop culture.)	2019	Minister of Culture, Sports and Tourism Commendation	

=== Listicles ===
Name of publisher, year listed, name of listicle, and placement
Publisher	Year	Listicle	Rank	Ref.
Forbes	2019	Korea Power Celebrity 40	20th	
Forbes	2020	Korea Power Celebrity 40	18th	
Forbes	2025	Korea Power Celebrity 40	29th	
Korean Film Council	2021	Korean Actors 200 (Note: Introduces 200 actors that best represent the present and future of Korean cinema to the people in the film industry all over the world.)	Included	
Madame Tussauds	2025	Hot 100	Included	
