= Bye June =

- Film poster
- Directed by: Choi Ho
- Written by: Choi Ho
- Produced by: Lee Woo-suk
- Starring: Yoo Ji-tae; Kim Ha-neul
- Cinematography: Oh Hyun-je
- Edited by: Choi Ho; Lim Tai-hyung
- Music by: Dj A-dang
- Production company: Dong-a Export
- Release date: March 28, 1998 (South Korea)
- Running time: 96 minutes
- Country: South Korea
- Language: Korean

Bye June (Korean: 바이 준; RR: Bai jun) is a 1998 South Korean drama film written and directed by Choi Ho. The film follows four youngsters who struggle with sex and drugs after their friend June's death. It marked the acting debuts of Kim Ha-neul and Yoo Ji-tae.

== Plot ==
Chae-young and Do-gi are twenty-one years old. They both carry the burden of their best friend June's death in a fire two years ago. June was their common friend and they idolized him. Chae-young and Do-gi try to fill in the mutual emptiness with sex, drugs and alcohol. But the memory of June comes between them in every way. They both love each other, but for Chae-young, June can never be fully replaced and Do-gi cannot help but feel that he is second best.

== Cast ==
- Yoo Ji-tae as Do-gi
- Kim Ha-neul as Chae-young
- Rang Ha as June / Byeong-cheon
- Han Ji-yun
- Kim Ba-da
- DJ A-dang
- Jung Sang-in
