= Kim Go-eun =

South Korean actress (born 1991)

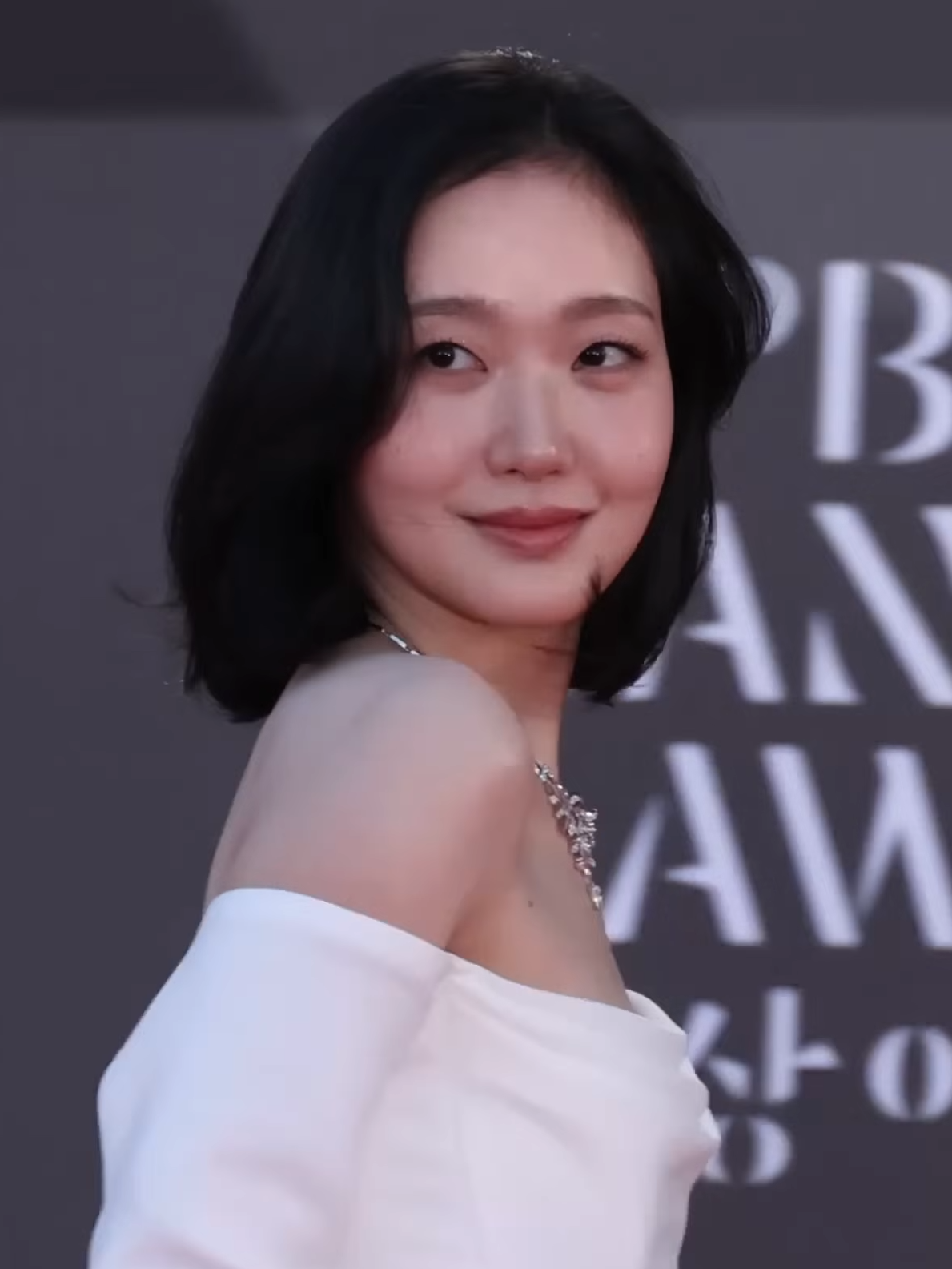
- Kim at the 2026 Baeksang Arts Awards
- Born: July 2, 1991 (age 35); Seoul, South Korea
- Education: Korea National University of Arts
- Occupation: Actress
- Years active: 2012–present
- Agent: BH Entertainment
- Awards: Full lists

Korean name
- Hangul: 김고은
- RR: Gim Goeun
- MR: Kim Koŭn

Signature
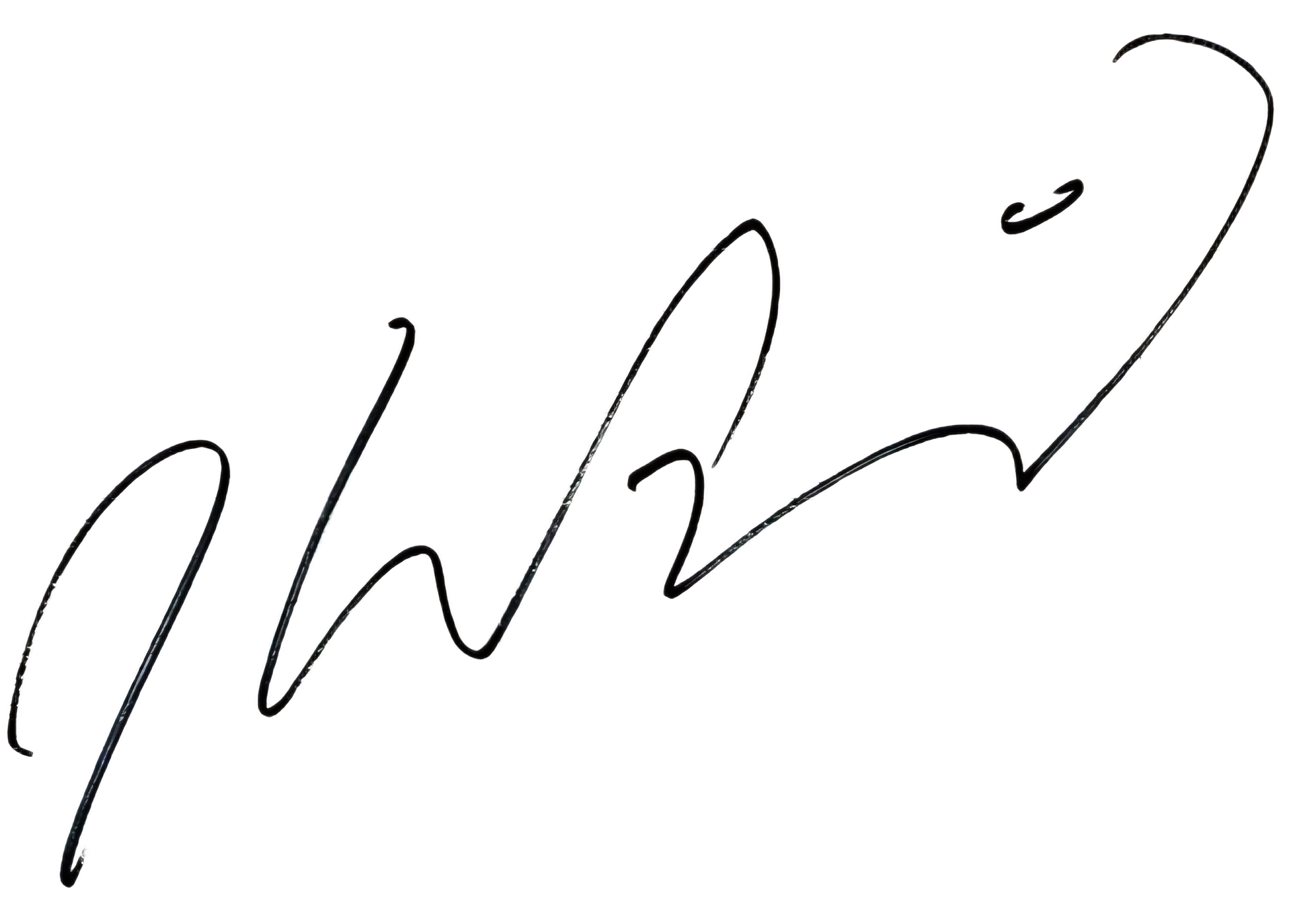

Kim Go-eun (Korean: 김고은; born July 2, 1991) is a South Korean actress. She debuted in the film Eungyo (2012), for which she won several Best New Actress awards in South Korea. She is also known for her roles in the television series Cheese in the Trap (2016), Guardian: The Lonely and Great God (2016–2017), Yumi's Cells (2021–2026), and Little Women (2022), as well as the films Coin Locker Girl (2015), Hero (2022), and Love in the Big City (2024).

For her performance in Exhuma (2024), Kim won several notable accolades, including the Baeksang Arts Awards and Blue Dragon Film Awards.

== Early life and education ==
Kim was born in on July 2, 1991, in Seoul, South Korea. In 1994, at the age of three, she moved with her family to Beijing, China, where she lived for ten years and became fluent in Mandarin. After watching Chen Kaige's Together multiple times, Kim decided to pursue a career in filmmaking, which ultimately led her to theater. She remarked, "When I stood on the stage for the first time, I was so nervous that I thought it would be so hard if I had to do this for the rest of my life. But from my second performance, I felt ecstatic, as if I had wings on my back, and I never wanted to step off the stage. I keep on acting because I want to hold on to that feeling".

Upon returning to South Korea, she attended Kaywon High School of the Arts. After graduation, she enrolled in the School of Drama at Korea National University of Arts as part of the Department of Acting's Class of 2010. Her peers from the same cohort included Ahn Eun-jin, Lee Yoo-young, Park So-dam, Lee Sang-yi, Kim Sung-cheol, Lee Hwi-jong, and Cha Seo-won.

== Career ==
=== 2012: A Muse and critical acclaim ===
She made her acting debut during her college years in Jung Ji-woo's film A Muse. Kim had no prior experience in film or television, having only participated in student productions and school plays. She met director Jung through mutual friends and was unaware that auditions were being held. "I ended up having an audition after chatting with the director. There wasn't even any time for me to prepare", Kim recalled. Ultimately, she was selected from among approximately 300 actresses who auditioned for the role.

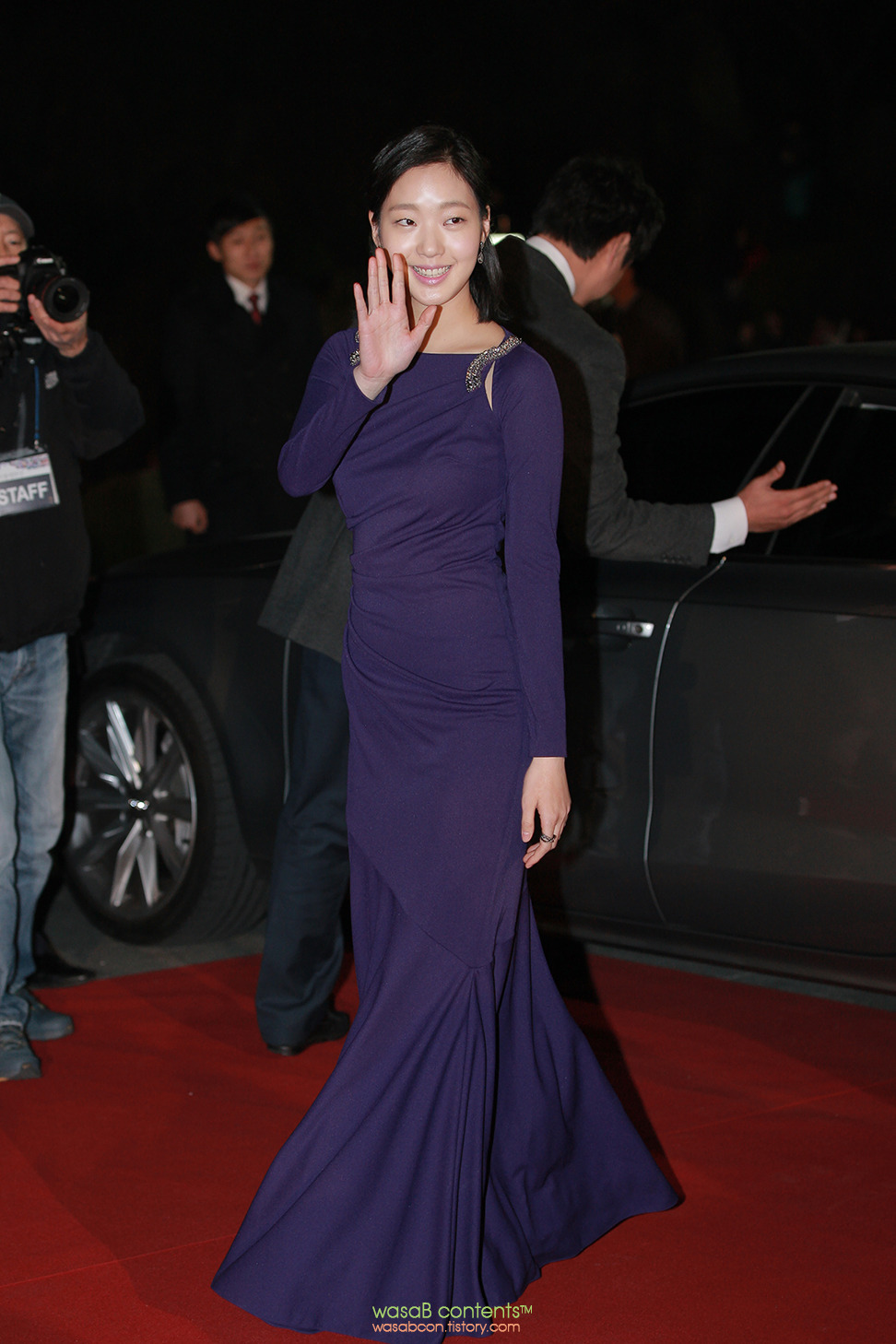
Kim at the 34th Blue Dragon Film Awards in 2013

Director Jung said Kim grew up over the course of making the film, saying, "Her facial expressions in the last few scenes of the film are strikingly different from the ones in the beginning. I wanted to capture the moments when she realizes how precious she is to herself and to others", adding that she showed off qualities that can only be found in someone who is unaware of her own beauty and what she is capable of. He also said, "She is naturally curious and brave. She's strong in a sense that she isn't influenced easily. She doesn't do things just because everyone else does it". Kim's performance as Eun-gyo, a 17-year-old high school student who becomes the object of desire for two men, garnered her numerous Best New Actress awards that year, catapulting her from obscurity into the spotlight.

=== 2013–2015: Hiatus and return to film ===
Despite many offers following A Muse, Kim took a break from acting and went back to college to complete her degree. She returned to the screen in 2014, showcasing her versatility in the thriller Monster where she played a developmentally disabled woman whose younger sister is murdered by a ruthless serial killer; her grief and rage drives her almost psychotic, and she plans her revenge.

In 2015, she and Kim Hye-soo were cast in Coin Locker Girl, a female-driven thriller based on the 1980 Japanese novel Coin Locker Babies. She was invited to the 2015 Festival de Cannes with the director and cast for this film, her first time there. Kim next starred in martial arts period drama Memories of the Sword, in which she acted opposite her longtime role model, actress Jeon Do-yeon. This was followed by courtroom film The Advocate: A Missing Body, where she played an aggressive prosecutor; and family film Canola, about a reunion between a girl and her grandmother alongside veteran actress Youn Yuh-jung.

=== 2016–2023: Television debut and prominence ===
In 2016, Kim made her television debut in the hit cable series Cheese in the Trap, based on the webtoon of the same title. She also contributed vocals to the track "Attraction" by Tearliner for the drama's soundtrack. Kim won the Baeksang Arts Award for Best New Actress (Television) for her performance. Later in 2016, she co-starred in Kim Eun-sook's megahit fantasy drama Guardian: The Lonely and Great God alongside Gong Yoo. The drama was a pan-Asian hit and a critical darling while also becoming a cultural phenomenon in South Korea. It was also the first Korean cable drama to surpass 20% in ratings, and as of June 2021, it is the fifth-highest rated Korean drama in cable television history.

In 2018, Kim played a secondary character in the film Sunset in My Hometown directed by Lee Joon-ik. For her role as a wild country girl, Kim gained 8 kg and learned a regional dialect. The same year, she was cast in the period romance Tune in for Love.

In 2019, Kim was cast in the fantasy drama The King: Eternal Monarch. The series was highly anticipated due to its great cast, renowned screenwriter, extensive publicity, and budget of over 30 billion won (US$25 million). It set a record on broadcast of its first episode as SBS's highest-rated Friday-Saturday drama premiere, and maintained the No.1 spot on the weekly Wavve drama chart for eight consecutive weeks. However, it was criticised for its screenplay and convoluted plot, which led to lower-than-expected domestic popularity.

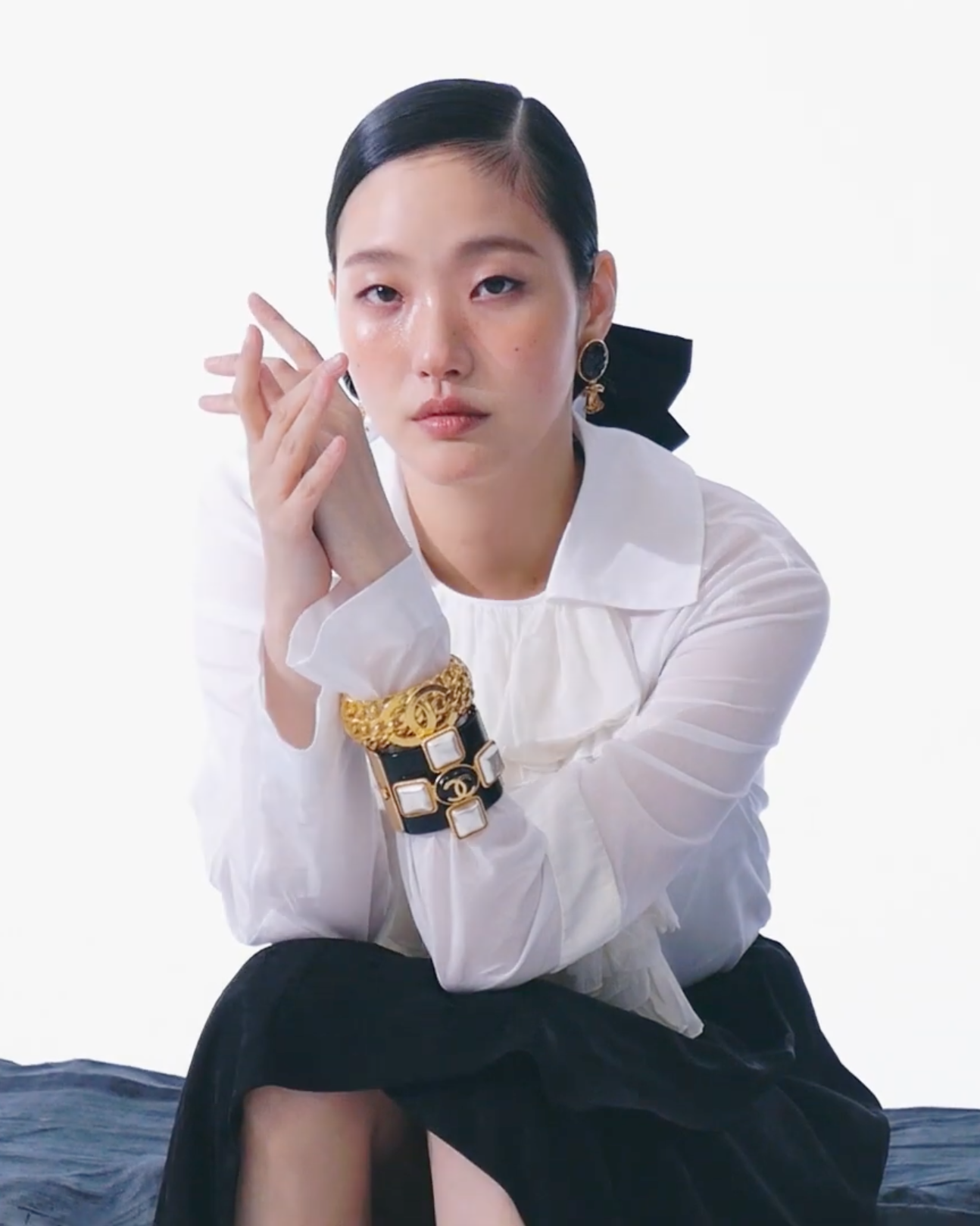
Kim for Marie Claire Korea in 2020

That same year she was cast in South Korea's first ever musical film Hero, which is based on the hit stage musical of the same name. The film is based on the life of freedom fighter An Jung-geun and his assassination of Itō Hirobumi, the first Prime Minister of Japan and Resident-General of colonized Korea. Kim played the role of a former kungnyŏ turned geisha who joins the Korean independence movement. The movie was originally scheduled to be released in July 2020, but was delayed due to the COVID-19 pandemic. It was finally released in December 2022 and grossed over $24 million at the domestic box office, making it South Korea's 6th highest-grossing film of the year.

In 2020, Kim starred in the lead role in Kim Jee-woon's short film Untact alongside Kim Joo-hun. In 2021 and 2022, Kim starred in Korea's first combined live-action/animated romantic comedy drama Yumi's Cells, a tvN TV series based on the eponymous webtoon which ran for two seasons. The drama resonated with viewers and was well-received; NME placed it on its list of 10 best Korean dramas of 2021. Kim's top-billed turn in particular received widespread attention; India Today lauded her performance as "impeccable", and Cosmopolitan Philippines called Kim "a chameleon...[who] manages to create a great character out of her roles".

In 2022, Kim starred in the TV series Little Women, a loose adaptation of Louisa May Alcott's novel of the same name. The series follows the story of three sisters who, after an unforeseen incident, escape poverty and find themselves entangled with one of the country's richest and most influential families. Kim portrayed the eldest sister, Oh In-ju. The show holds a perfect 100% rating from critics on review aggregator platform Rotten Tomatoes, with critics praising Kim's performance. Tanu I. Raj of NME commended Kim's portrayal of In-ju, describing her as "taciturn and self-sacrificial", yet also expressing "a sympathetic, starry-eyed awe". Nathan Sartain from Ready Set Cut remarked that Kim brings "a spirited insecurity" to her performance, which enhances her character's "bubbling curiosity".

=== 2024 to present: Box office success and critical acclaim ===
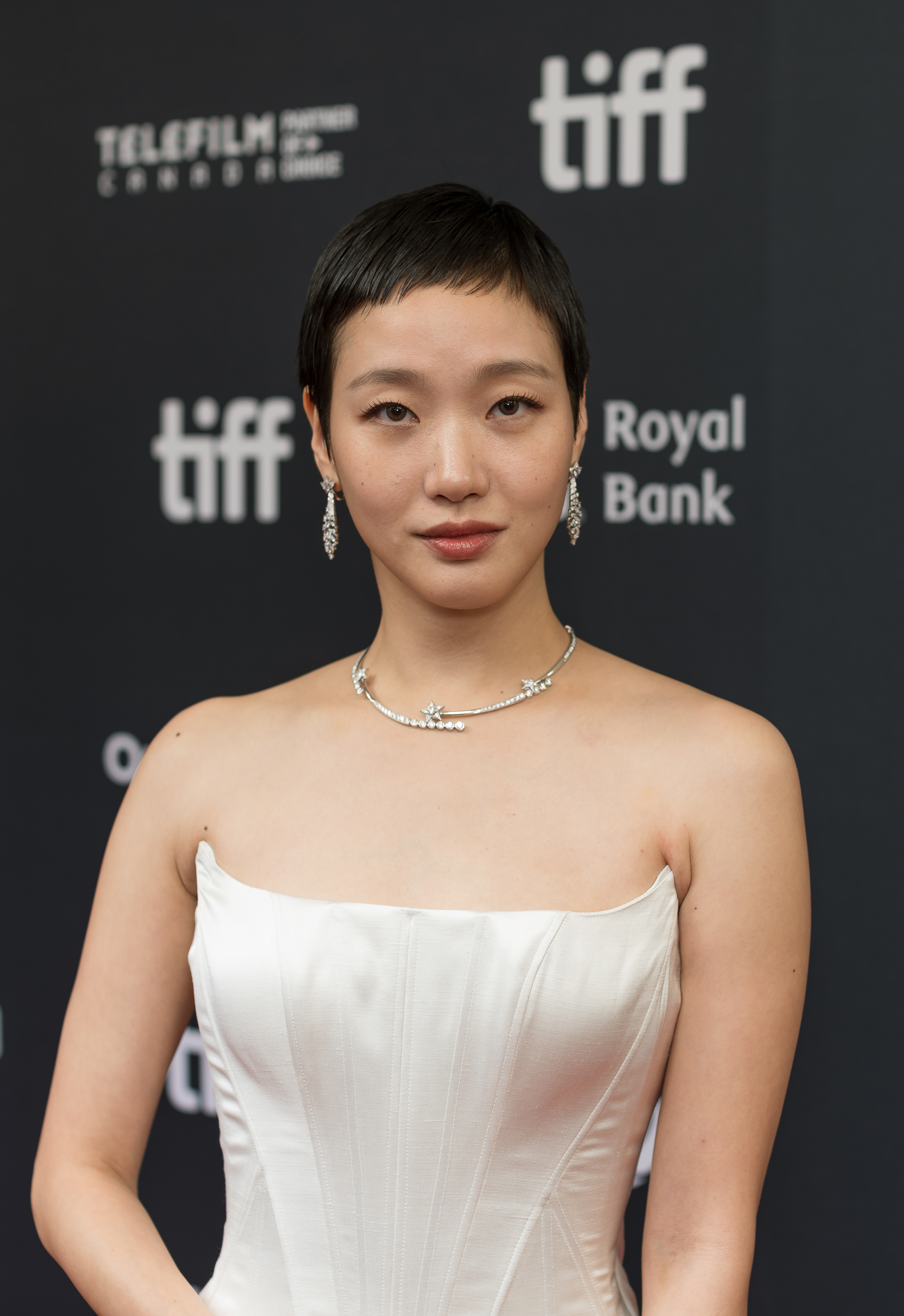
Kim at the 2024 Toronto International Film Festival

In 2024, Kim reached another career milestone with a leading role in Jang Jae-hyun's occult-thriller film Exhuma. She plays a young shaman Hwa-rim, starring veteran actors Choi Min-sik and Yoo Hae-jin, as well as rising actor Lee Do-hyun. The film premiered at the 74th Berlin International Film Festival on February 16, 2024, in the Forum section. It was released theatrically on February 22 and received positive reviews from critics. The film quickly dominated the South Korean box office, reaching 5 million admissions in a record-breaking 10 days. By May 8, 2024, its success continued, grossing $95 million and exceeding 11 million admissions, making it both the highest-grossing film of 2024 and the sixth-highest-grossing domestic film in South Korean history. Kim also earned a spot in the "Ten Million Club", a term for actors whose films have sold over 10 million tickets.

Kim's performance of a "daesal gut", a shamanistic ritual involving animal sacrifice, garnered significant attention. The authenticity was so compelling that the film's shamanic advisors, Go Chun-ja and Lee Da-young, claimed a real spirit was summoned during one of her scenes. Her powerful portrayal was widely praised by critics and fans alike. The Korea Herald lauded her "memorable acting", stating she "captivat[ed] the audience with her terror-inducing songs, oracles and prayers". For this role, Kim won Best Actress at the 60th Baeksang Arts Awards and 45th Blue Dragon Film Awards.

In October 2024, Kim had another film released. She starred as Jae-hee in Love in the Big City, the film adaptation of Sang Young Park's bestselling novel of the same name. Director E.oni planned to adapt the film few years ago, but faced difficulties due to production and budget issues, as well as casting a male actor to play a gay character. Kim waited two and a half years for the film to be greenlit. The film focus on the first part of the novel, which follows the friendship between a "free-spirited" young woman and a closeted gay man as they live together and endure ups and downs in their love lives in modern-day Seoul. Her performance received critical acclaim. Woman Donga praised her portrayal of Jae-hee as a "standout" and noted she transformed the character, who initially seemed "out of place", into a "multifaceted" figure. She earned Best Actress nominations at the Baeksang Arts Awards, and Director's Cut Awards, and won in Buil Film Awards.

In 2025, Kim Go-eun starred in two Netflix original series in different genres. The first is her reunion with Park Ji-hyun in a romance coming-of-age streaming series You and Everything Else. Kim portrayed Ryu Eun-jung and her complex friendship between her and Cheon Sang-yeon (Park Ji-hyun) from their teenage years to their forties. Written by Song Hye-jin, directed by Jo Yeong-min, it released on Netflix on September 12, 2025. Her second project, The Price of Confession, released on December 5, features Kim as Mo-eun, a mysterious prisoner known as "the witch". She forms an alliance with Ahn Yoon-soo (played by Jeon Do-yeon), an art teacher who is wrongly accused of murder, offering to confess to the crime in exchange for a favor.

== Other ventures ==
=== Ambassadorship and endorsement ===
Regarding her decision to limit advertisement appearances, Kim noted that she never prioritized her image or potential endorsements when selecting film projects. "What worries me", she explained, "is what impact my appearance in commercials would have on my roles". Despite this selective approach, in 2019, Kim was named a Chanel Ambassador for South Korea, and was later selected to be one of the seven faces of Chanel's "J12 Turns 20" campaign in 2020. In August 2019, at a press conference held at the Korea Press Center, Kim was appointed as an honorary ambassador for Korea's Ministry of the Environment's Resource Circulation.

=== Philanthropy ===
Kim's philanthropic activities that prioritize disaster relief were frequently channeled through the Hope Bridge Korea Disaster Relief Association. (Note: The Hope Bridge Korea Disaster Relief Association is a non-profit organization established in 1961. It was founded by newspaper companies, broadcasting companies, and social organizations to assist individuals affected by unforeseen disasters. Originally known as the "Korea Flood Damage Response Committee", it initially focused on providing financial aid for the victims of Typhoon Sarah in 1959. In 1964, the organization was renamed the "Korea Disaster Response Association" to expand its relief efforts and promote a culture of donation within society. In 2001, with the amendment of the Disaster Relief Act, The Hope Bridge Korea Korea Disaster Relief Association became the only relief organization in the country authorized by the government to raise and distribute donations for domestic natural disasters.) In March 2022, she donated ₩50 million for the Uljin forest fire relief. She another contributed ₩50 million on August 11, 2022, to assist those affected by South Korean floods. In March 2025, she donated ₩50 million to support regions affected by South Korea wildfires in Ulsan, Gyeongbuk, and Gyeongnam. Her international outreach includes a ₩30 million donation via Good Neighbors for the 2023 Turkey–Syria earthquake.

In addition to disaster relief, Kim has focused on public health and pediatric care. In February 2020, during the COVID-19 pandemic, she donated ₩100 million through Good Neighbors to provide 40,000 masks for low-income families. Her dedication to children's health is seen by constant support for the Seoul National University Children's Hospital. This includes a ₩50 million donation in honor of Korean National Children's Day on May 5, 2021, and a ₩100 million contribution in October 2022 to commemorate her 10th anniversary as an actress.

== Filmography ==
=== Film ===
Year	Title	Role	Notes	Ref.
2012	Yeong-a	Yeong-a	Short film	
2012	A Muse	Han Eun-gyo		
2013	Neverdie Butterfly	Moon Soo-yeon	Cameo	
2014	Monster	Bok-soon		
2015	Coin Locker Girl	Il-young		
2015	Memories of the Sword	Seol-hee / Hong-yi		
2015	The Advocate: A Missing Body	Jin Sun-mi		
2016	Canola	Hye-ji		
2018	Sunset in My Hometown	Sun-mi		
2019	Hit-and-Run Squad	Min-jae's acquaintance	Cameo	
2019	Tune in for Love	Kim Mi-soo		
2020	Untact	Soo-jin	Short film	
2022	Hero	Seol-hee		
2024	Dog Days	Soo-jeong	Cameo	
2024	Exhuma	Lee Hwa-rim		
2024	Love in the Big City	Jae-hee		

=== Television series ===
Year	Title	Role	Notes	Ref.
2016	Cheese in the Trap	Hong Seol		
2016–2017	Guardian: The Lonely and Great God	Ji Eun-tak		
2020	The King: Eternal Monarch	Jung Tae-eul / Luna		
2021–2026	Yumi's Cells	Kim Yumi	Season 1–3	
2022	Little Women	Oh In-ju		
2025	You and Everything Else	Ryu Eun-joong		
2025	The Price of Confession	Mo-eun / Kang So-hae / "the Witch"		
2027	Soul			

=== Television shows ===
Year	Title	Role	Notes	Ref.
2021	Sea of Hope	Cast member	Ocean Guard	

== Discography ==
Title	Year	Peak chart positions	Album
Title	Year	KOR Gaon	Album
"Sun, Moon, Stars, And Us" (Shin Seung-hun ft. Kim Go-eun)	2015	—	Non-album single
"Attraction" (Tearliner ft. Kim Go-eun)	2016	—	Cheese in the Trap OST
"Dark Hearts Will Pass Away Tonight"	2022	—	Yumi's Cells 2 OST
"My Dream For You"	2022	—	Hero OST
"What Is This Feeling"	2022	—	Hero OST
"Your Majesty, I Remember you"	2022	—	Hero OST
"—" denotes releases that did not chart or were not released in that region.
