= Bloody Tie =

2006 South Korean neo-noir action film

- Theatrical release poster
- Hangul: 사생결단
- RR: Sasaenggyeoldan
- MR: Sasaenggyŏltan
- Directed by: Choi Ho
- Written by: Choi Ho; Yun Deok-won
- Produced by: Shim Bo-kyung; Lee Jong-ho
- Starring: Ryoo Seung-bum; Hwang Jung-min
- Cinematography: Oh Hyun-je
- Edited by: Kim Sang-bum; Kim Jae-bum
- Music by: Kim Sang-man
- Production companies: KD Media; Myung Films; Pancinema
- Distributed by: MK Pictures
- Release date: April 26, 2006 (South Korea)
- Running time: 117 minutes
- Country: South Korea
- Language: Korean
- Budget: $5 million
- Box office: $10.6 million

Bloody Tie (Korean: 사생결단; lit. 'A Life-or-Death Decision') is a 2006 South Korean neo-noir action crime film directed by Choi Ho, it stars Hwang Jung-min as a detective trying to track down a drug lord by cooperating with a mid-level drug dealer, played by Ryoo Seung-bum.

== Plot ==
Sang-do (Ryoo Seung-bum) is a fast talking crystal meth dealer who considers himself more of a businessman than a criminal. Sang-do has been involved in the drug business all of his life. His uncle was a drug dealer (Kim Hee-ra), specializing in manufacturing crystal meth. Sang-do's mother died when one of his uncle's meth labs blew up in an accident.

Do Jin-kwang (Hwang Jung-min) is a hard-nosed cop who doesn't always play by the rules. Do's partner died four years ago, while trying to take down the top drug dealer Jang Chul (Lee Do-kyeong) in Busan. Since his partner's death, Do has been driven to arrest Jang Chul and this time he plans to use Sang-do to finally take him down.

== Cast ==
- Ryoo Seung-bum - Oh Sang-do
- Hwang Jung-min - Do Jin-kwang
- Kim Hee-ra - Lee Taek-jo
- Choo Ja-hyun - Ji-young
- Lee Do-kyeong - Jang Chul
- On Joo-wan - Yoo Sung-geun
- Kim Jin-hyeok - Young-nam
- Jung Woo - Detective Kim
- Lee Eol - Detective Kim
- Shin Jung-geun - Section chief Go
- Yang Ki-won - Hyung-nam
- Kim Sun-hwa - Hyung-nam's girl
- Min Do-gi
- Choi Jin-ho - Chang-joon

== Awards and nominations ==
2006 Busan Film Critics Awards

- Best Actor - Hwang Jung-min
- Best Supporting Actress - Choo Ja-hyun

2006 Grand Bell Awards

- Best New Actress - Choo Ja-hyun
- Nomination - Best Actor - Ryoo Seung-bum
- Nomination - Best Editing - Kim Sang-bum, Kim Jae-bum

2006 Blue Dragon Film Awards

- Nomination - Best New Actress - Choo Ja-hyun
- Nomination - Best Cinematography - Oh Hyun-je
- Nomination - Best Lighting - Im Jae-young
- Nomination - Best Music - Kim Sang-man

2006 Korean Film Awards

- Best Supporting Actress - Choo Ja-hyun
- Best New Actress - Choo Ja-hyun
- Nomination - Best Actor - Ryoo Seung-bum
- Nomination - Best Actor - Hwang Jung-min
- Nomination - Best Cinematography - Oh Hyun-je
- Nomination - Best Editing - Kim Sang-bum, Kim Jae-bum

2006 Director's Cut Awards

- Best New Actress - Choo Ja-hyun

2007 Baeksang Arts Awards

- Best Actor - Ryoo Seung-bum
- Nomination - Best New Actress - Choo Ja-hyun
