= Park Bum-shin =

South Korean writer (born 1946)

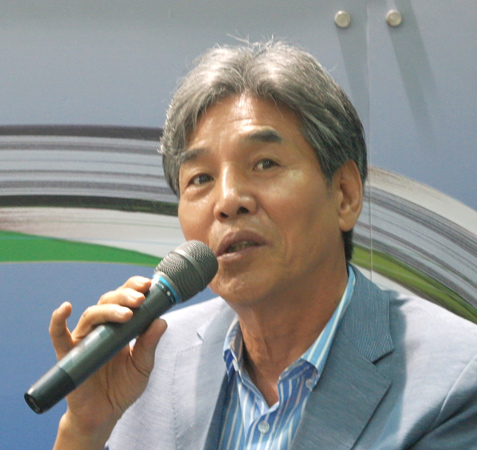
- Park at the 2013 Seoul Book Fair
- Born: August 24, 1946 (age 80); Nonsan, Southern Korea (now Nonsan, South Chungcheong, South Korea)
- Occupation: Novelist
- Writing career
- Language: Korean

Korean name
- Hangul: 박범신
- Hanja: 朴範信
- RR: Bak Beomsin
- MR: Pak Pŏmsin

Park Bum-shin (Korean: 박범신; born August 24, 1946) is a South Korean writer.

== Life ==
Park Bum-shin was born in Nonsan, Chungcheongnam-do. He graduated from Jeonju National University of Education, Wonkwang University and Korea University. While working as a Korean language teacher at a middle school, he made his literary debut in 1973 with the short story Remains of the Summer (Yeoreum ui janhae), which won him the JoongAng Ilbo's New Year's Literary Contest. In the same year, along with the poets Kim Seung-hui and Jeong Ho-seung, Park founded a literary group called the 73 Group.

After 28 years of teaching in Myongji University's creative program, he retired in 2011. Upon his retirement from the academe and the release of his 39th novel My Hand Turns into a Horseshoe, Park moved back to his hometown, where he concentrates only on writing. He also writes his diaries, which he plans to publish.

== Work ==
In 1979, Park began serializing his first novel Lie Like a Leaf of Grass (Pullipcheoreom nupda) in the JoongAng Ilbo, which would become known as his signature work. For the work's sensitive, even poetic, descriptions of the losses sustained by the Korean people in the period of rapid urbanization, Park received the 1981 Korean Literature Prize.

More serialized novels followed, which exhibited Park's lyrical but realistic style, which details the dreams and frustrations of average citizens adrift in a world of base materialism and brutal opportunism. Of special note are Fire Nation (Bul-ui nara) and Water Nation (Mul-ui nara), which appeared in The Dong-a Ilbo in the early and mid-1980s and won critical recognition. The stories are satirical portrayals of the upsets, ambitions and disappointments of two country boys Baek Chan-gyu and Han Gil-su, who move to Seoul as it rushes toward industrialization and urbanization. The novels reflect the author's own experience of urban life as a young man.

In 1979, Park began serializing his first novel Lie Like a Leaf of Grass (Pullipcheoreom nupda) in the JoongAng Ilbo, which would become known as his signature work. For the work's sensitive, even poetic, descriptions of the losses sustained by the South Korean people in the period of rapid urbanization, Park received the 1981 Korean Literature Prize.

In addition to his two hit novels, Park also wrote other works set against the period of South Korea's economic rise, such as The Forest Never Sleeps (Supeun jamdeulji anneunda) and I Listen to Mozart on Wednesdays (Suyoil ein Mochareuteu leul deudneunda). These works describe the dreams of city dwellers frustrated by powers beyond their control, but are narrated in a style close to that of popular romantic or detective novel. The more popular his novels became, however, the more Park resented being characterized as an author catering to public taste. In 1993, with over 20 years of best-selling literature to his name, Park suddenly announced in a newspaper article that he was unable to continue writing his novel, then in progress. The author, whose two suicide attempts as a youth speaks to deep thirst for communication with the world, could not endure criticism and discontinued writing for three years until 1996, when he published The Cart Pulled by the White Cow (Heuin so ga ggeuneun sure).

Park's return to novel writing led to more highly developed artistic works, including re-workings of some of his older novels. More recently, he has written penetrating recollections of his own life as an author, as well as passionate works about nature and life based on his travels and experiences in foreign cultures and spaces. In A Filthy Desk (Deoreoun chaeksang, co-winner of the Manhae Prize for Literature in 2003), Empty Room (Bin bang) and Namaste (Namseute), Park confirmed his position as a veteran author who incorporates both artistic value and popular elements into his writing.

Amid the crisis of publishing in a post-industrial society, in 2008 Park became the first South Korean veteran novelist to post his novel on the Internet before publishing it in print. His novel Cholatse was serialized in top internet portal Naver for five months where it received 1 million hits. Through the new technology, Park said it was a great pleasure for him to learn the readers' responses to his work.

The popularity of his novels led to 20 subsequent film and television adaptations, which made Park a household name. Among them, Park said he was most excited about the 2012 film A Muse. Adapted from his provocative 2010 novel Eun-gyo in which a poet in his 70s who falls for a high school girl, Park said it reflected his own personal thoughts on aging, human psychology and desire.

"I've always gone for the second best options in my life," Park told reporters at a press meeting held in central Seoul in 2011. "It was the only way to compromise. I had too many things to take care of at once. But from now on, I want writing to be my top priority, nothing else."

== Works in Korean (partial) ==
- Rabbit and the Submarine (Tokki wa jamsuham, 1978)
- The Trap (Deot, 1978)
- A Balloon Flown in the Morning (Achime nallin pungseon, 1979)
- Sleep Deeper than Death (Jugeumboda gipeun jam, 1979)
- Winter River and Spring Breeze (Gyeoul gang hanuibaram, 1979)
- Lie Like a Leaf of Grass (Pullipcheoreom nupda, 1980)
- Fireworks (Bulkkot nori, 1983)
- The Forest Never Sleeps (Supeun jamdeulji anneunda, 1985)
- Fire Nation (Bul-ui nara, 1987)
- Water Nation (Mul-ui nara, 1988)
- The Cart Pulled by a White Ox (Heuin so ga ggeuneun soore, 1997)
- A Filthy Desk (Deoreoun chaeksang, 2003)
- Empty Room (Bin bang, 2004)
- Namaste (Namseute, 2005)
- Cholatse (2008, revised 2015)
- Eun-gyo (2010)
- Business (2010)
- My Hand Turns into a Horseshoe (2011)
- My Love is Not Yet Over (Essay, 2012)
- Salt (Sogeum, 2013)
- Healing (Essay, 2014)
- Small Landscapes (Sosohan Poongyung, 2014)
- Wrinkles (Jureum, 2015)
- You (Dangshin, 2015)
- Yuri (2017)

== Works in English ==
- The Trap, in "The Snowy Road and Other Stories"
