= Kim Gook-hee =

South Korean actress (born 1985)

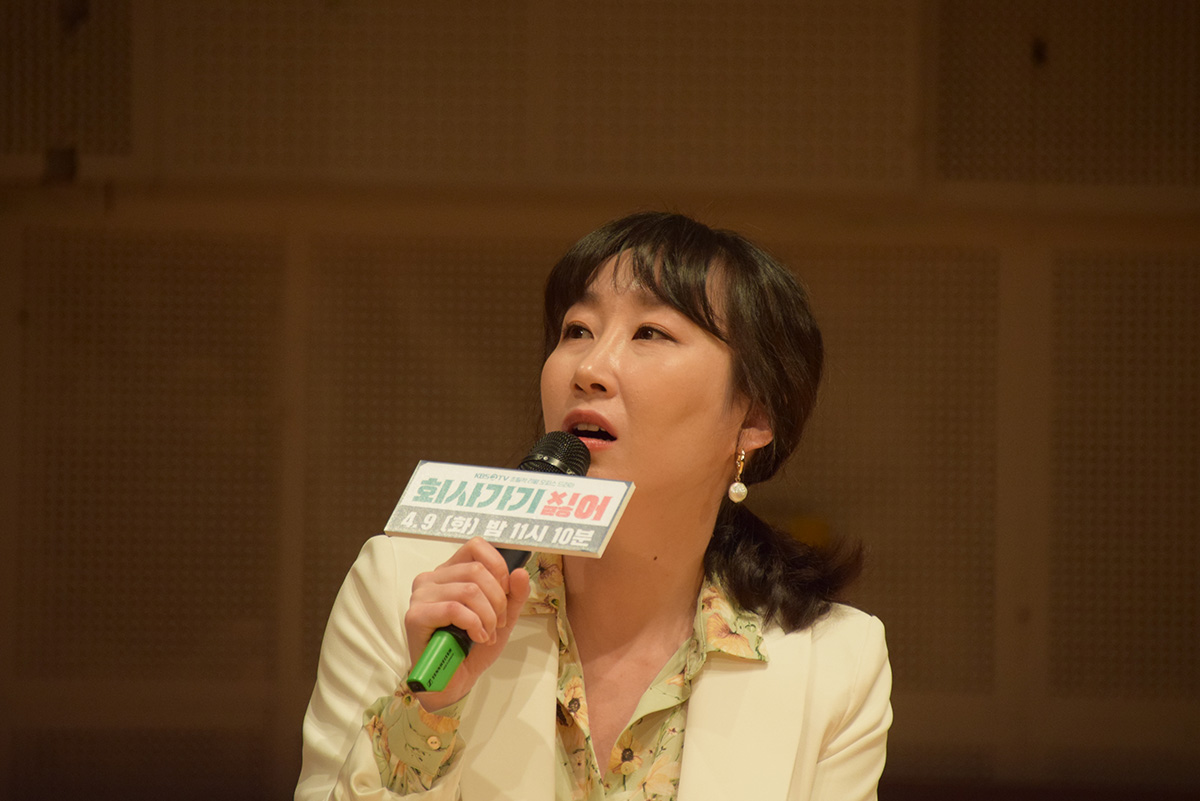
- Kim in 2019
- Born: Kim Gook-hee; December 1, 1985 (age 40); Daejeon, South Korea
- Other names: Kim Guk-hee, Kim Guk-hui
- Occupation: Actress
- Years active: 2017–present
- Agent: Alien Company
- Known for: Tune in for Love; Hospital Playlist; Microhabitat
- Spouse: Ryu Kyung-hwan

Korean name
- Hangul: 김국희
- RR: Gim Gukhui
- MR: Kim Kukhŭi

Kim Gook-hee (Korean: 김국희; born December 1, 1985) is a South Korean actress. She is best known for her roles in dramas such as Hospital Playlist and she is also known for her roles in movies such as Microhabitat, Kim Ji-young: Born 1982 and 1987: When the Day Comes. She is best known for her role as Eun-ja in movie, Tune in for Love.

== Personal life ==
Kim Gook-hee is married to Ryu Kyung-hwan.

== Filmography ==
=== Film ===
Year	Title	Role	Ref.
2017	One Line	Joo-hee	
2017	1987: When the Day Comes	Han Byeong-yong	
2017	Microhabitat	Hyeon-jeong	
2018	Kim Ji-young: Born 1982	Soo-bin's mother	
2019	Tune in for Love	Eun-ja	
2019	Bring Me Home	Jin-wook's mother	
2020	And So Again Today	The Season of the Next Step	
2020	The Season of the Next Step	Kook-hee	
2021	Bernarda Alba	Martirio	
2022	Emergency Declaration	Mi-ryang	
2022	My Son	Ha-yeong	
2023	Sleep	Min-jeong	
2025	Dark Nuns	Hyo-won	
2025	Concrete Market	Mi-seon	
2026	Heartman: Rock and Love	Mi-young	

=== Television series ===
Year	Title	Role	Ref.
2019	I Hate Going to Work	Yang Seon-yeong	
2020	Hospital Playlist	Gal Ba-ram	
2020	Do You Like Brahms?	Ji-won's mother	
2021	Jirisan	Dr. Yoon Su-jin	
2022	Tracer	Noh Sun-joo	
2022	Behind Every Star	Yoo Eun-soo	
2023	Strangers Again	Han Go-eun	
2024	Hide	Joo Sin-hwa	
2024	Family Matters	Oh Gil-ja	
2025	When Life Gives You Tangerines	Professor	
2025	Concrete Market	Mi-seon	

=== Web series ===
Year	Title	Role	Ref.
2020	Sweet Home	Son Hye-in	
2021	Dr. Brain	Madame	
2022	Glitch	Goo Hye-yeon	
2022	Concrete Market	Mi-sun	
2023	Moving	Hong Seong-hwa	
2023	Sweet Home Season 2	Son Hye-in	
2025	Cashero	Park Jung-ja	

== Awards and nominations ==
Year	Award	Category	Nominee / Work	Result	Ref.
2018	7th Yegreen Musical Award	Best Supporting Actress	Red Book	Won	
2019	3rd Korean Musical Awards	Best Supporting Actress	Red Book	Won	
2020	56th Baeksang Arts Awards	Best Supporting Actress – Film	Tune in for Love	Nominated	
2020	Chunsa Film Art Awards 2020	Best Supporting Actress	Tune in for Love	Nominated	
2025	4th Blue Dragon Series Awards	Best Supporting Actress	Family Matters	Nominated	
