= Cha Seung-woo =

South Korean singer and actor

- Born: July 27, 1978 (age 48); South Korea
- Occupations: Singer; actor

Korean name
- Hangul: 차승우
- RR: Cha Seungu
- MR: Ch'a Sŭngu

Cha Seung-woo (born July 27, 1978), better known as Cha Cha, is a South Korean singer and actor. Cha was a member of punk band No Brain, The Moonshiners and The Monotones.

== Filmography ==
=== Film ===
Year	Title	Role	Notes
2008	Radio Dayz	JODK Big Band – Moonshiners	
2008	Girl Scout		credited for music
2008	Go Go 70s	Man-sik	

=== Television ===
Year	Title	Role	Notes
2020	Mom Has an Affair	Wang Ki-beom	
2022	Vengeance of the Bride	Cha Wi-dae	

== Awards and nominations ==
Year	Award	Category	Nominated work	Result
2009	17th Chunsa Film Art Awards	Best New Actor	Go Go 70s	Won
2009	45th Baeksang Arts Awards	Best New Actor (Film)	Go Go 70s	Nominated
2009	46th Grand Bell Awards	Best New Actor	Go Go 70s	Nominated
2009	32nd Golden Cinematography Awards	Best New Actor	Go Go 70s	Won
