= Happy End (1999 film) =

- Theatrical release poster
- Hangul: 해피엔드
- RR: Haepi endeu
- MR: Haep'i endŭ
- Directed by: Jung Ji-woo
- Written by: Jung Ji-woo
- Produced by: Lee Eun; Jeon Chang-rok
- Starring: Choi Min-sik; Jeon Do-yeon; Joo Jin-mo
- Cinematography: Kim Woo-hyung
- Edited by: Kim Hyeon; Kim Yong-su
- Music by: Jo Yeong-wook; Kim Gyu-yang
- Production company: Myung Films
- Release date: 11 December 1999
- Running time: 99 minutes
- Country: South Korea
- Language: Korean

Happy End (Korean: 해피엔드) is a 1999 South Korean psychological thriller film written and directed by Jung Ji-woo, starring Choi Min-sik, Jeon Do-yeon, and Joo Jin-mo. The film is about a woman who has an affair while her husband is struggling to find employment.

== Plot ==
Choi Bora (Jeon Do-yeon), who works at an English language institute, is having an affair with her ex-lover, Kim Il-beom (Joo Jin-mo). Her husband, Seo Min-ki (Choi Min-sik), is a former banker. He has lost his job, and has taken over the domestic roles of the house: cooking, cleaning, and watching the baby. In his free time, he watches soap operas and reads romance novels.

Min-ki is aware of the affair, but seems willing to put up with it and to continue living with his cheating wife. He loves their infant daughter dearly. He tells Bora that he would be happy if she was a good mother for their baby. This is incompatible with her affair. Bora is disturbed when her lover appears to want to take the affair further and push past her boundaries, risking to expose their relationship. Il-beom calls her at home and even shows up at her door. Bora ends up drugging her own child, and Min-ki finds the toddler alone at home, and brings her to the hospital.

The movie then spirals towards its conclusion, with Min-ki apparently leaving by train, accompanied by his female friend, who lives in the same building. However, in reality he comes back to the apartment, kills Bora and frames Il-beom. The neighbor finds Bora's body, and In light of Il-beom's suspicious behavior, plus the planted evidence, the police seems convinced that the latter is responsible for Bora's death.

Despite Happy End's themes and ending, the film is not altogether downbeat. Director Jung Ji-woo has taken the role of observer, using mostly handheld cameras to capture the events in the lives of his 3 main subjects. The film is sexually explicit, and there is one scene of brutal violence.

== Cast ==
- Choi Min-sik as Seo Min-ki
- Jeon Do-yeon as Choi Bo-ra
- Joo Jin-mo as Kim Il-beom
- Joo Hyun as Bookstore owner
- Hwang Mi-seon as Mi-yong
- Kim Byeong-chun
- Park Ji-il
- Park Nam-hee
- Lee Geum-ju
- Yoo Yeon-soo as detective with sideburns
- Park Sung-il as video store clerk

== Production ==
Director Jung Ji-woo said he did share his thoughts about the graphic nature of the sex scenes with actress Jeon Do-yeon, explaining he wanted them "to feel utterly real and natural".
