= Exhuma =

2024 film by Jang Jae-hyun

- Theatrical release poster
- Hangul: 파묘
- Hanja: 破墓
- Lit.: Exhumation and relocation of a grave
- RR: Pamyo
- MR: P'amyo
- Directed by: Jang Jae-hyun
- Written by: Jang Jae-hyun
- Starring: Choi Min-sik; Kim Go-eun; Yoo Hae-jin; Lee Do-hyun
- Cinematography: Lee Mo-gae
- Edited by: Jung Byung-jin
- Music by: Kim Tae-seong
- Production companies: Showbox; Pinetown Productions; MCMC
- Distributed by: Showbox
- Release dates: February 16, 2024 (Berlinale); February 22, 2024 (South Korea)
- Running time: 134 minutes
- Country: South Korea
- Languages: Korean; English; Japanese
- Budget: $11 million
- Box office: $93.9 million

Exhuma (Korean: 파묘; RR: Pamyo) is a 2024 South Korean horror film written and directed by Jang Jae-hyun, and starring Choi Min-sik, Kim Go-eun, Yoo Hae-jin and Lee Do-hyun. The film includes mystery and occult elements, and follows the process of excavating an ominous grave, which unleashes dreadful consequences buried underneath.

Exhuma premiered in the Forum section at the 74th Berlin International Film Festival on February 16, 2024. It was released theatrically on February 22 and received positive reviews from critics. The film grossed $93.9 million worldwide, becoming the highest-grossing South Korean film of 2024 and the seventh highest-grossing South Korean film of all time.

== Plot ==
Renowned Korean shaman Hwa-rim and her protégé, Bong-gil, are hired by a wealthy Korean American real estate developer family to investigate the mysterious illness afflicting their newborn son. Hwa-rim identifies the cause as a “Grave’s Call”, a vengeful ancestor's spirit haunting the family. The patriarch, Park Ji-yong, asks them to relocate his grandfather’s grave. Hwa-rim recruits feng shui master and geomancer Kim Sang-deok and mortician Yeong-geun, promising them 500,000 USD, which particularly appeals to Sang-deok because he needs money for his daughter’s wedding.

Sang-deok, who specialises in selling burial sites to wealthy clients, becomes suspicious when Ji-yong insists on cremating the grave, located on a remote mountain near the North Korean border. He initially refuses, sensing sinister energy, but agrees after Ji-yong doubles the payment. Hwa-rim assures the group that she can perform a ritual during the excavation to prevent the curse. Ji-yong explains that a famous monk, ‘Gisune’, had revealed the grave’s location to deter grave robbers.

Hwa-rim and Bong-gil perform the ritual as the grave is excavated. The work proceeds smoothly until a gravedigger accidentally decapitates a human-headed snake, producing a bad omen and bringing rain. Yeong-geun decides to wait before cremating the coffin, storing it at a nearby ward. The local custodian, having heard rumours of treasure, opens the coffin and releases Ji-yong’s grandfather, a vengeful spirit who kills Ji-yong’s parents and Ji-yong himself. The grandfather, revealed to have been a collaborator with Imperial Japan during the colonial period, is tormented by his improper burial. Sang-deok cremates the coffin before the spirit can kill the baby, ending the curse.

Months later, Yeong-geun tells Sang-deok that a gravedigger has been disturbed since killing the snake. Returning to the site, Sang-deok finds the snake’s head and a second burial site containing a seven-foot-long standing coffin. He summons Hwa-rim, Bong-gil and Yeong-geun to help dispose of it. After excavating the coffin, they rest at a temple, where Hwa-rim learns that Gisune was actually the powerful Japanese shaman Murayama Junji, known as The Fox.

That night, Bong-gil witnesses an oni killing the temple priest, a pig farmer and his pigs. Hwa-rim and Bong-gil discover that the coffin has been torn open from within, and Hwa-rim is attacked by the oni, a samurai who died at the Battle of Sekigahara and was originally enshrined in Japan before being transferred to Korea. Bong-gil is injured and possessed, while the others see the oni transform into a ball of fire and return to the mountain.

Using Bong-gil's possession to investigate the oni’s origins, Hwa-rim learns that, during the Japanese occupation of Korea, Imperial Japan ordered its shamans to bury large iron spiritual spikes across the country to disrupt its life force and facilitate colonial rule. Sang-deok discovers that the supposed grave robbers were Korean patriots trying to remove these spikes, and that the samurai oni was the guardian spirit protecting one of them.

Sang-deok, Hwa-rim and Yeong-geun plan to excavate the relic after the creature rises at midnight, with Hwa-rim distracting the samurai while the others dig. A vision reveals The Fox embedding a katana inside a decapitated samurai’s body, transforming him into a tsukumogami, while Ji-yong’s grandfather’s grave conceals the relic. Sang-deok realises that the samurai itself is the iron spike and, because it represents fire in feng shui, must be defeated with water and wood. He uses a wooden pickaxe soaked in his own blood to destroy the samurai spirit. Although badly injured and rendered unconscious, Sang-deok later awakens in hospital with the others at his bedside. Months later, the group attends his daughter’s wedding.

== Cast ==
=== Main ===
- Choi Min-sik as Kim Sang-deok, feng shui master
- Kim Go-eun as Lee Hwa-rim, shaman
- Yoo Hae-jin as Ko Yeong-geun, undertaker
- Lee Do-hyun as Yoon Bong-gil, shaman

=== Supporting ===
- Kim Jae-cheol as Park Ji-yong, Hwa-rim's client
- Kim Sun-young as Oh Gwang-shim, shaman
- Kim Ji-an as Park Ja-hye, a junior shaman
- Jung Sang-cheol as Park Jong-soon, Park Ji-yong's father
- Jeon Jin-ki as Park Geun-hyun, Park Ji-yong's grandfather / Park Jong-soon's father
- Kim Min-joon as Japanese ghost

== Production ==
In June 2021, it was reported that Choi Min-sik will star in director Jang Jae-hyun's occult thriller. Kim Go-eun and Lee Do-hyun joined the cast in August 2022, followed by Yoo Hae-jin, who joined the cast in September 2022.

The film produced by Showbox and Pinetown Production in association with MCMC, is directed by Jang Jae-hyun, who is known for making occult films.

Principal photography began in October 2022, and filming ended in March 2023. The director in an interview disclosed that the film used a large number of real scenes and real props for filming, tried not to use studios and avoided using CGI effects in post-production. In his own words, "I tried to actually film the background and objects, avoiding CGI whenever possible. We took the photos as painstakingly as possible without building a set, and for things like ghost photos, the actual actors wore makeup for 6 hours and then took blurry photos on purpose."

== Release ==
Exhuma had its world premiere on February 16, 2024, as part of the 74th Berlin International Film Festival, in Forum.

It was released theatrically on February 22, 2024, in South Korea by Showbox Co., Ltd.

The film was first screened at the 48th Hong Kong International Film Festival on April 7, 2024, in Gala presentations.

It was released in India on May 3, 2024.

It was released on Shudder on June 14 (United States and Canada).

The theatrical release date in the MENA region is June 13, 2024, distributed by The Plot Pictures MENA.

The film was showcased in "Prime Picks" at the 23rd New York Asian Film Festival on July 20, 2024. It competed in the 57th Sitges Film Festival in the "Oficial Fantàstic Competició" section and won Special Jury Award. It was screened in the festival on 4 October 2024.

== Reception ==
The film includes scenes that are critical of the Japanese occupation of Korea, with the unearthing of the curse being linked to the unearthing of Korea's past.

=== Box office ===
The film was released on February 22, 2024, on 2,086 screens. On its opening day, the film finished in first place at the South Korean box office with 336,114 admissions and a gross of US$2,369,404, breaking the highest opening score for a film released in 2024 in South Korea so far. The film topped the South Korean weekend box office in its opening weekend, grossing US$14,455,880 from 1,963,577 admissions. On February 25, the fourth day of its release, the film exceeded 2 million admissions, and on February 28, the seventh day, it crossed 3 million admissions. On March 2, the 10th day it surpassed 5 million viewers. On March 10, it became the highest performing Korean occult film with 8 million viewers. Exhuma on March 24 became the first Korean film of 2024 to surpass 10 million in ticket sales, on its 32nd day in theaters, according to Showbox.

As of May 15, 2024, the film has grossed US$84,095,030 from 11,902,097 admissions, making it the highest grossing South Korean film of 2024.

The film has grossed $97,602,124 worldwide as per Box Office Mojo. It has recorded more than 2.23 million moviegoers in Vietnam as of March 31, and became the most successful Korean Film there, beating record of 2.15 million of 6/45 a 2022 comedy film. It is also the most successful Korean film in Indonesia, recording 2.3 million admissions by March 31.

=== Critical response ===
Exhuma was received well by critics. On review aggregator website Rotten Tomatoes, the film has an approval rating of 93% and an average rating of 7.6/10, based on 45 reviews. On Metacritic, the film has a weighted average score of 80 out of 100 based on 5 critics, which the site labels as "generally favorable" reviews.

Lee Yoon-seo writing for The Korea Herald praised the performance of the cast writing, "the veteran cast puts in a strong performance to add to the immersive experience" and stated that "Exhuma consists of Jang's careful efforts to deliver super-realistic, detailed scenes depicting Korean shamanism - such as the traditional process of exhumation and "gut" rituals held to appease wandering spirits". Lee felt that these "are so realistically portrayed, that the film achieves a new level of horror". Concluding it that "however, despite the fine acting and attention to detail, Exhuma stumbles in unfolding its plot."

Critics of Cine21 gave the movie generally favorable reviews. This movie scored an average score of 7.15 out of 10 on Cine 21. Lee Yong-cheol rated the movie 4 out of 5 stars, writing that it is a well-made genre movie with great meaning. Meagan Navarro of Bloody Disgusting rated the film 4/5 and called it, "A fun horror with a lot on its mind." Navarro wrote, "Jae-hyun Jang combines introspective cultural and historical themes with creepy, gory, and atmospheric horror thrills in an exciting way."

=== Accolades ===
Name of the award ceremony, year presented, category, nominee of the award, and the result of the nomination
Award ceremony	Year	Category	Nominee / Work	Result	Ref.
Asian Film Awards	2025	Best Film	Exhuma	Nominated	
Asian Film Awards	2025	Best Director	Jang Jae-hyun	Nominated	
Asian Film Awards	2025	Best Actor	Choi Min-sik	Nominated	
Asian Film Awards	2025	Best Actress	Kim Go-eun	Nominated	
Asian Film Awards	2025	Best Newcomer	Lee Do-hyun	Nominated	
Asian Film Awards	2025	Best Screenplay	Jang Jae-hyun	Nominated	
Asian Film Awards	2025	Best Costume Design	Choi Yoon-sun	Won	
Asian Film Awards	2025	Best Production Design	Seo Seong-gyeong	Nominated	
Asian Film Awards	2025	Best Original Music	Kim Tae-seong	Nominated	
Asian Film Awards	2025	Best Visual Effects	Kim Shin-chul, Daniel Son	Won	
Asian Film Awards	2025	Best Sound	Kim Byung-in	Nominated	
Baeksang Arts Awards	2024	Best Film	Exhuma	Nominated	
Baeksang Arts Awards	2024	Best Director	Jang Jae-hyun	Won	
Baeksang Arts Awards	2024	Best Actor	Choi Min-sik	Nominated	
Baeksang Arts Awards	2024	Best Actress	Kim Go-eun	Won	
Baeksang Arts Awards	2024	Best Supporting Actor	Yoo Hae-jin	Nominated	
Baeksang Arts Awards	2024	Best New Actor	Lee Do-hyun	Won	
Baeksang Arts Awards	2024	Best Screenplay	Jang Jae-hyun	Nominated	
Baeksang Arts Awards	2024	Technical Award	Kim Byung-in (Sound)	Won	
Blue Dragon Film Awards	2024	Best Film	Exhuma	Nominated	
Blue Dragon Film Awards	2024	Best Director	Jang Jae-hyun	Won	
Blue Dragon Film Awards	2024	Best Actor	Choi Min-sik	Nominated	
Blue Dragon Film Awards	2024	Best Actress	Kim Go-eun	Won	
Blue Dragon Film Awards	2024	Best Supporting Actor	Yoo Hae-jin	Nominated	
Blue Dragon Film Awards	2024	Best New Actor	Lee Do-hyun	Nominated	
Blue Dragon Film Awards	2024	Best Screenplay	Jang Jae-hyun	Nominated	
Blue Dragon Film Awards	2024	Best Editing	Jeong Byung-jin	Nominated	
Blue Dragon Film Awards	2024	Best Cinematography and Lighting	Lee Mo-gae, Lee Sung-hwan	Won	
Blue Dragon Film Awards	2024	Best Art Direction	Seo Seong-gyeong	Won	
Blue Dragon Film Awards	2024	Best Music	Kim Tae-seong	Nominated	
Blue Dragon Film Awards	2024	Technical Award	Lee Eun-ju (Make up)	Nominated	
Brand of the Year Awards	2024	Best Actress (Movie)	Kim Go-eun	Won	
Buil Film Awards	2024	Best Film	Exhuma	Nominated	
Buil Film Awards	2024	Best Director	Jang Jae-hyun	Nominated	
Buil Film Awards	2024	Best Actress	Kim Go-eun	Nominated	
Buil Film Awards	2024	Best Supporting Actor	Yoo Hae-jin	Nominated	
Buil Film Awards	2024	Best Screenplay	Jang Jae-hyun	Nominated	
Buil Film Awards	2024	Best New Actor	Lee Do-hyun	Nominated	
Buil Film Awards	2024	Best Art/Technical Award	Seo Seong-gyeong	Nominated	
Buil Film Awards	2024	Best Music	Kim Tae-seong	Nominated	
Buil Film Awards	2024	Yu Hyun-mok Film Arts Award	Jang Jae-hyun	Won	
Busan Film Critics Awards	2024	Best Actor	Choi Min-sik	Won	
Cine21 Film Awards	2024	Movie of The Year	Exhuma	2nd	
Cine21 Film Awards	2024	Best Director	Jang Jae-hyun	Won	
Cine21 Film Awards	2024	Best Actress	Kim Go-eun	Won	
Director's Cut Awards	2025	Best Director (Film)	Jang Jae-hyun	Won	
Director's Cut Awards	2025	Best Screenplay (Film)	Jang Jae-hyun	Won	
Director's Cut Awards	2025	Best Actress (Film)	Kim Go-eun	Won	
Director's Cut Awards	2025	Best Actor (Film)	Choi Min-sik	Nominated	
Director's Cut Awards	2025	Best New Actress (Film)	Kim Ji-ahn	Nominated	
Director's Cut Awards	2025	Best New Actor (Film)	Lee Do-hyun	Won	
Korean Film Producers Association Awards	2024	Best Screenplay	Jang Jae-hyun	Won	
Korean Film Producers Association Awards	2024	Best Actress	Kim Go-eun	Won	
Korean Film Producers Association Awards	2024	Best Sound	Kim Byung-in	Won	
Korean Film Producers Association Awards	2024	Best Lighthing	Lee Sung-hwan	Won	
Korean Film Producers Association Awards	2024	Art Award	Seo Sung-kyung	Won	
Marie Claire Film Festival	2024	Pioneer Award	Kim Go-eun	Won	
Sitges Film Festival	2024	Special Jury Award	Exhuma	Won	
Women in Film of the Year Awards	2024	Best Actress	Kim Go-eun	Won	
Festival international du film fantastique de Gérardmer	2025	Jury Award	Exhuma	Won	
