= Somebody (TV series) =

2022 South Korean television series

- Promotional poster
- Hangul: 썸바디
- RR: Sseombadi
- MR: Ssŏmbadi
- Genre: Thriller; Melodrama; Crime
- Created by: Netflix
- Written by: Jung Ji-woo; Han Ji-wan
- Directed by: Jung Ji-woo
- Starring: Kim Young-kwang; Kang Hae-rim; Kim Yong-ji; Kim Soo-yeon
- Music by: Lee Ji-yeon
- Country of origin: South Korea
- Original language: Korean
- No. of episodes: 8

Production
- Producers: Jung A-reum; Ok Kwang-hee
- Running time: 50 minutes
- Production company: Beyond J

Original release
- Network: Netflix
- Release: November 18, 2022

Somebody (Korean: 썸바디) is a 2022 South Korean television thriller series written by Jung Ji-woo and Han Ji-wan, directed by Jung Ji-woo, and starring Kim Young-kwang, Kang Hae-rim, Kim Yong-ji, and Kim Soo-yeon. It was released on Netflix on November 18, 2022.

== Synopsis ==
Kim Sum (Kang Hae-lim) is a developer for social connecting app "Somebody." Even though she has difficulty communicating with other people, she is friends with Mok-won (Kim Yong-ji) and Gi-eun (Kim Soo-yeon). Her friend Gi-eun works as a detective.

A murder takes place and the app "Somebody" is involved in the murder case. Architectural designer Sung Yun-oh (Kim Young-Kwang) appears in front of Sum and her friends. Yun-oh is an attractive man, but he seems to be hiding something. Meanwhile, Gi-eun investigates the murder case with help of Mok-won.

== Cast ==
=== Main ===
- Kim Young-kwang as Sung Yun-oh

An architectural designer and a psychopathic killer with mixed extreme personalities but does not reveal his true feelings. He begins to reveal his hidden true self when he meets Sum.

- Kang Hae-lim as Kim Sum

A developer of the Somebody app. She has extraordinary talent enough to develop an artificial intelligence chatting program and social connecting. She has Asperger syndrome.

- Kim Yong-ji as Im Mok-won

A shaman who is friends with Sum and Gi-eun.

- Kim Su-yeon as Yeong Gi-eun

Sum's best friend of 10 years and a police officer who tracks down a mysterious case involving Somebody. She has Paraplegia and requires to be on a wheelchair wherever she moves.

=== Supporting ===
- Bae Gang-hee as Lee Ha-in

A co-worker and Spectrum server manager.

- Choi Yu-ha as Samantha Jung

The representative of Spectrum, a service provider for Somebody app.

- Choi Sang-hyuk as Shim Woo-cheol
- Choo Sun-woo as Jang Ha-na
- Song Yeon-ji as Rose
- Shin Moon-sung as Min Gi-ung

A professor.

- Kang Ji-eun as Hong Gong-joo
- Kim Joong-ki as Kim Eun-pyeong

A detective police officer.

- Shim Woo-sung as Oh Bool-gwang

A detective police officer.

=== Special appearances ===
- Choi Jae-hoon as Mr. Jung (Episodes 1 and 7)
- Park Yoon-hee as Director of design office. (Episode 2)
- Kim Na-yeon as Oh Na-eun (Episode 2)
- Lee Ki-chan as 79NewMoney

A rich great land owner. (Episode 3)

- Won Choon-gyu as a merchants' association chairman. (Episode 3)
- Kim Keun-soon as a merchants' association chairman. (Episode 3)
- Seo Kwang-jae as a merchants' association chairman. (Episode 3)
- Lee Ji-ha as Kim Sum's mother. (Episode 4)
- Park So-eul as young Kim Sum (Episode 4)
- Kim Byung-man as a hoody man. (Episode 4)
- Choi Rak-yeong as a hoody man. (Episode 4)
- Lee Eun-woo as Foxy (Episodes 7 and 8)
- Kim Ho as a taxi driver. (Episode 8)
