= Choi Ho =

South Korean filmmaker (born 1967)

- Born: 1967 (age 58–59); Seoul, South Korea
- Education: Chung-Ang University; Paris 8 University
- Occupations: Film director, screenwriter

Korean name
- Hangul: 최호
- RR: Choe Ho
- MR: Ch'oe Ho

Choi Ho (Korean: 최호; born 1967) is a South Korean film director and screenwriter. Choi is known for his films, notably, Bye June (1998), Bloody Tie (2006), Go Go 70s (2008) and Big Match (2014).

== Filmography ==
=== As director ===
- Opening the Closed School Gates (1992)
- Young Lover (1994)
- Bye June (1998)
- Who R. U.? (2002)
- Bloody Tie (2006)
- Go Go 70s (2008)
- Big Match (2014)

=== As screenwriter ===
- Bye June (1998)
- Who R. U.? (2002)
- Bloody Tie (2006)
- Go Go 70s (2008)
- Big Match (2014)

=== As script editor ===
- Bye June (1998)
