= Go Go 70s =

- Film poster
- Hangul: 고고70
- RR: Gogo70
- MR: Kogo70
- Directed by: Choi Ho
- Written by: Choi Ho; Bang Jun-seok; Baek Bae-jeong
- Produced by: Shim Bo-kyeong; Lee Jong-ho; Park Jae-hyun
- Starring: Cho Seung-woo; Shin Min-a; Cha Seung-woo
- Cinematography: Kim Byeong-seo
- Edited by: Kim Sang-bum; Kim Jae-bum
- Music by: Bang Jun-seok
- Distributed by: Showbox/Mediaplex
- Release date: October 2, 2008 (South Korea)
- Running time: 118 minutes
- Country: South Korea
- Language: Korean
- Box office: (admissions: 581,468)

Go Go 70s (Korean: 고고70) is a 2008 South Korean musical comedy drama film directed by Choi Ho, starring Cho Seung-woo, Shin Min-a, and Cha Seung-woo. This film depicts the situation in South Korea in the 1970s when it was under the dark age of Park Chung Hee's military dictatorship, but also an era of revolutionary cultural upheaval.

== Plot ==
South Korea in the 1970s was in the Dark Ages of Park Chung Hee's military dictatorship, but it was also an era of revolutionary upheaval with regard to culture. After wandering the shabby clubs of a U.S. military base, vocalist Sang-kyu and guitarist Man-sik form the indie rock band The Devils with four other members. After entering a rock band contest and making a strong impression with their shocking yet entertaining performance, The Devils achieve stardom and begin playing at a club called Nirvana. Mimi, a groupie who follows the Devils from town to town, also becomes an icon with her dance moves and fashion sense. However, their heyday doesn't last long as one of the band members gets killed in a fire at the club. To make matters worse, many clubs are being forced to shut down due to military oppression, which would fundamentally take away the opportunity for bands to perform. Despite their despair and looming disbandment, Sang-kyu plans one last concert for The Devils.

== Cast ==
- Cho Seung-woo as Sang-kyu, The Devils vocalist and guitarist
- Shin Min-a as Mimi, leader of Wild Girls
- Cha Seung-woo as Man-sik, The Devils guitarist
- Song Kyung-ho as Dong-geun, The Devils drummer
- Choi Min-chul as Dong-soo, The Devils trumpet player
- Kim Min-kyu as Kyung-goo, The Devils bassist
- Hong Kwang-ho as Joon-yeob, The Devils saxophonist
- Lee Sung-min as Lee Byeong-wook
- Im Yeong-sik as Byeong-tae
- Kim Soo-jeong as Young-ja
- Yoon Chae-yeon as Ki-bok
- Min Bok-gi as boss of club Nirvana
- Yoo Chang-sook as Dong-soo's mother
- Lee Sang-yong as Nam-dae criminal investigator
- Hong Seok-bin as Criminal investigator of The Devils 1
- Jo Deok-jae as Criminal investigator of The Devils 2
- Kwon Jeong-min as Jailhouse police
- Jin Yong-gook as Folk song singer Teacher Kim
- Kim Jae-rok as Recording engineer
- Kwon Hyeok-poong as Music salon owner
- Hwang Yeon-hee as President of American club
- Yoon Jeong-yeon as Mimi's backup dancer
- Jang Mi-yeon as Mimi's backup dancer
- Oh Ji-eun as Fighting prostitute
- Lee Jong-yoon as Gambling band
- Geum Gi-jong as Gambling band
- Park Soo-jo as Jailhouse detective
- Kim Jong-eon as Bat group
- Lee Ha-neul as Bat group
- Kim Hyeong-jin as Bat group
- Lee Si-eun as Criminal investigator of Lee Byeong-wook
- Im Hyeong-tae as Young-ja's father
- Kim Moon-yeong as Lee Byeong-wook's fan
- Lee Malg-eum as Lee Byeong-wook's fan
- Hong Sang-jin as Scottman
- Choi Pyeong-woong as Daehan news announcer

== Production ==
The screenplay was co-written by director Choi Ho, composer Bang Jun-seok and Baek Bae-jeong, based on Bang's experiences as a child listening to The Beatles. Lead actor Cho Seung-woo took guitar lessons to prepare for his role.

== Box office ==
The film sold 595,156 tickets nationwide and earned $3,433,279.

== Awards and nominations ==
| Year | Award | Category | Recipients | Result |
|---|---|---|---|---|
| 2008 | 4th University Film Festival of Korea | Best Supporting Actress | Shin Min-a | Won |
| 2008 | 6th Korean Film Awards | Best Supporting Actress | Shin Min-a | Nominated |
| 2008 | 29th Blue Dragon Film Awards | Best Cinematography | Kim Byeong-seo | Nominated |
| 2008 | 29th Blue Dragon Film Awards | Best Lighting | Shin Kyung-man | Nominated |
| 2008 | 29th Blue Dragon Film Awards | Best Music | Bang Jun-seok | Nominated |
| 2009 | 46th Grand Bell Awards | Best New Actor | Cha Seung-woo | Nominated |
| 2009 | 46th Grand Bell Awards | Best Editing | Kim Sang-bum, Kim Jae-bum | Nominated |
| 2009 | 46th Grand Bell Awards | Best Music | Bang Jun-seok | Nominated |
| 2009 | 46th Grand Bell Awards | Best Sound Effects | Park Jong-kun | Nominated |
| 2009 | 6th Max Movie Awards | Best Actress | Shin Min-a | Won |
| 2009 | 17th Chunsa Film Art Awards | Best Actress | Shin Min-a | Won |
