= Big Match (film) =

- Theatrical release poster
- Hangul: 빅매치
- RR: Bingmaechi
- MR: Pingmaech'i
- Directed by: Choi Ho
- Written by: Choi Ho
- Produced by: Park Sang-hyun
- Starring: Lee Jung-jae; Shin Ha-kyun; Lee Sung-min; BoA; Kim Eui-sung
- Cinematography: Choi Min-ho
- Edited by: Shin Min-kyung
- Music by: Lee Ji-su
- Production company: BK Pictures
- Distributed by: United International Pictures
- Release date: November 27, 2014 (South Korea)
- Running time: 112 minutes
- Country: South Korea
- Language: Korean
- Box office: US$7.8 million

Big Match (Korean: 빅매치; RR: Bingmaechi) is a 2014 South Korean action film written and directed by Choi Ho, starring Lee Jung-jae, Shin Ha-kyun, Lee Sung-min and BoA.

== Plot ==
Choi Ik-ho (Lee Jung-jae), is a former footballer and UFC mixed martial arts star nicknamed "Zombie." When his older brother and coach Young-ho suddenly disappears, the police arrests him as the prime murder suspect. Then Ik-ho receives a phone call from Ace (Shin Ha-kyun), a genius mastermind who designs elaborate games for Korea's wealthiest citizens to bet astronomical sums of money on, conducted with real people in real-time using high-tech gadgets and CCTV cameras. To save his brother's life and his own, Ik-ho is forced to join Ace's game and follow instructions from a mysterious woman named Soo-kyung (BoA). Using his wits and skills against multiple adversaries, including cops and low-rent gangsters, Ik-ho completes seemingly impossible missions. Then he reaches the final round, during which he must find his brother in a huge soccer stadium, with a bomb strapped to his ankle and time ticking.

== Cast ==
- Lee Jung-jae as Choi Ik-ho
- Shin Ha-kyun as Ace
- Lee Sung-min as Choi Young-ho
- BoA as Soo-kyung
- Kim Eui-sung as Detective Do
- Bae Sung-woo as Axe, gang member
- Son Ho-jun as Jae-yeol, president of Ik-ho's fan club
- Choi Woo-shik as Guru, hacker
- Ryu Hye-rin as Twitter girl
- Kim Yoon-seong as Department head Jo
- Park Doo-shik as Detective Nam
- Ra Mi-ran as Young-ho's wife
