= Eungyo =

- Theatrical release poster
- Hangul: 은교
- RR: Eungyo
- MR: Ŭn'gyo
- Directed by: Jung Ji-woo
- Screenplay by: Jung Ji-woo
- Based on: Eun-gyo by Park Bum-shin
- Produced by: Ahn Eun-mi; Lee Sang-hyun; Jung Ji-woo
- Starring: Park Hae-il; Kim Mu-yeol; Kim Go-eun
- Cinematography: Kim Tae-kyung
- Edited by: Kim Sang-bum; Kim Jae-bum
- Music by: Yeon Ri-mok
- Distributed by: Lotte Entertainment
- Release date: April 26, 2012
- Running time: 129 minutes
- Country: South Korea
- Language: Korean
- Box office: US$8.7 million

Eungyo (Korean: 은교), also called A Muse in some countries, is a 2012 South Korean erotic romantic film adaptation of author Park Bum-shin's novel Eun-gyo. A 70-year-old poet falls in love with a high school girl and is inspired to write a short story about her, but his star student, who is jealous of the relationship, steals his literary work.

== Plot ==
Lee Jeok-yo is a respected national poet in his 70s. His thirty-something assistant Seo Ji-woo recently published his first book, described as a genre novel with psychological insight, and it has shot to the top of the bestseller lists. Finding a young high schoolgirl, Eun-gyo, asleep on a chair on his porch, Jeok-yo, instantly enamored, agrees to give her a part-time job cleaning his home. As Jeok-yo spends more time in Eun-gyo's company, long-lost feelings are awakened within him, and her exuberance, sense of fun, and genuine warmth towards him make him see himself as the young man he used to be. His love and need for her grow not only because he finds her incredibly beautiful, but also because of how she makes him feel. Deeply smitten, Jeok-yo begins to write a short story about his imagined sexual relationship with the young woman. However, as the two get ever closer, Ji-woo condemns their relationship as inappropriate and repugnant, and he steals the short story to publish under his own name.

== Cast ==
- Park Hae-il as Lee Jeok-yo
- Kim Mu-yeol as Seo Ji-woo
- Kim Go-eun as Han Eun-gyo
- Jeong Man-shik as President Park
- Jang Yun-sil as Reporter
- Jeong Seo-in as repair Landlady
- Ahn Min-Yeong as Poet

== Production ==
The novel, which revolves around a relationship between a poet in his 70s and a 17-year-old high school girl, had sparked heated debate as soon as it began to appear in serialized form on author Park Bum-shin's personal blog.

Park said, "I've never been this excited for a film adaptation of my work. I'm thrilled because this novel is based on my own personal thoughts as I grew older. It's a very special piece of mine, and I trusted director Jung's caliber of delving into human psychology and desire." Park visited the film crew twice during the production of the movie, and presented autographed copies of his novel to the leading actors and actresses.

Director Jung Ji-woo said he chose Park Hae-il for the role, instead of an older actor, for a specific reason, saying, "This movie deals with what it is like to age, and what it is like to want something when you've lost your youth. I thought that the theme would be delivered more effectively when such a role is given to an actor who is much younger."

Before shooting, Park visited Pagoda Park to observe elderly men, and went through hours of discussion with the director to perfect his character. Jung praised Park's "incredible tolerance," undergoing eight hours of special make-up daily and learning the weary gait and gesture of a man in his 70s.

Kim Go-eun was a drama major at Korea National University of Arts who had never appeared in a film or TV series before, not even in a minor role, having only previously acted in student productions or school plays. She met Jung in 2011 through a circle of friends and was not even aware that auditions for the film were being held. "I ended up having an audition after chatting with the director. There wasn't even any time for me to prepare," Kim recalled. She was chosen among some 300 actresses who auditioned to play the role of innocent yet sensual Eun-gyo. Looking for an actress that "had to be ordinary and alive at the same time," Jung said he decided on Kim "by discussing the book and her personal thoughts about Eun-gyo [...] What I liked about Go-eun was that she didn't try to impress me at all. She didn't try to please anybody. She didn't try to look pretty in front of the camera. She was just herself. That's what drew me to her." He flatteringly said she was similar to his previous Happy End leading lady, acclaimed actress Jeon Do-yeon. Novelist Park Bum-shin agreed that she was right for the role upon meeting her, saying, "She was perfect for the forever virgin and forever young image that Eun-gyo symbolizes." Kim said of her film debut, "It took a lot of courage to play this role. [...] I don't think physical beauty alone could have unleashed so much passion in a man who had lived for over 70 years with a heart of a stone. Eun-gyo is very spontaneous and is too innocent to have thought about the consequences of what she is doing, but she also has a mature side. She lacks parental care and love, so she desires this from a surrogate father figure, and becomes obsessed with the idea." Co-star Park Hae-il described her as "fresh, dreamy and attractive. Kim Go-eun is Eun-gyo."

The last line of the character, who is also a victim of domestic violence, was written by Jung, and does not exist in the novel. "I never knew how pretty I was (until I met you)," Eun-gyo tells the poet. Jung said, "It's really about a young girl's journey learning about herself and her own worth. I wanted to capture the moments when she realizes how precious she is to herself and to others."

== Reception ==
Upon its release the film attracted some controversy for its depiction of sex between a 70-year-old man and a high school-aged girl.

The film opened on April 25, 2012 and notched 630,000 admissions in its first week. Overall, the film has sold 1,343,916 tickets.

== Awards and nominations ==
2012 Buil Film Awards

- Best Film
- Best New Actress - Kim Go-eun
- Nomination - Best Supporting Actor - Kim Mu-yeol
- Nomination - Best Music - Yeon Ri-mok

2012 Grand Bell Awards

- Best New Actress - Kim Go-eun
- Nomination - Best Film
- Nomination - Best Actress - Kim Go-eun

2012 Korean Association of Film Critics Awards

- Best New Actress - Kim Go-eun

2012 Blue Dragon Film Awards

- Best New Actress - Kim Go-eun
- Best Cinematography - Kim Tae-kyung
- Best Lighting - Hong Seung-chul
- Nomination - Best Art Direction - Kim Si-yong
- Nomination - Technical Award - Song Jong-hee

2012 Busan Film Critics Awards

- Best New Actress - Kim Go-eun

2013 KOFRA Film Awards (Korea Film Reporters Association)

- Best New Actress - Kim Go-eun

2013 Baeksang Arts Awards

- Nomination - Best New Actress - Kim Go-eun

2013 New York Asian Film Festival

- Star Asia Rising Star Award - Kim Go-eun
