= Jung Ji-woo =

South Korean film director (born 1968)

- Born: May 7, 1968 (age 58); South Korea
- Occupations: Film director, screenwriter
- Spouse: Kwak Sin-ae

Korean name
- Hangul: 정지우
- Hanja: 鄭址宇
- RR: Jeong Jiu
- MR: Chŏng Chiu

Jung Ji-woo (also spelled as Chung Ji-woo; born May 7, 1968) is a South Korean film director. He is best known for his films Happy End (1999) and Eungyo (2012).

== Filmography ==
=== Feature film ===
Year	Title	Credited as			Notes	Ref.
Year	Title	Director	Writer	Producer	Notes	Ref.
1998	Skate	Assistant director	No	No		
1999	Happy End	Yes	Yes	No		
2005	Blossom Again	Yes	Yes	No	Also editor	
2006	If You Were Me 2 "A Boy With the Knapsack"	Yes	No	No	Omnibus film	
2008	Modern Boy	Yes	Yes	No		
2010	Moss	No	Yes	No		
2012	Eungyo	Yes	Yes	Yes		
2015	Fourth Place	Yes	Yes	Yes		
2017	Heart Blackened	Yes	Yes	No		
2019	Tune in for Love	Yes	Yes	No		

=== Short film ===
Year	Title	Credited as		Notes
Year	Title	Director	Writer	Notes
1994	The Expedition	No	No	Cinematographer
1994	Cliffy	Yes	Yes	Also editor
1995	Cat Woman & Man	No	No	Cinematographer, editor, actor
1995	Grandfather	No	No	Cinematographer, lighting, actor
1996	Just Do It	No	Yes	
1996	A Bit Bitter	Yes	Yes	Also editor
1999	We Can't Share A Toilet	No	No	As actor
1999	Deep, Round and Dark	No	No	As actor
2012	정지우x김무열x조은지 Project	Yes	No	

=== Documentary ===
Year	Title	Role			
Year	Title	Role	2006	Two or Three Things I Know about Kim Ki-young	Interviewee

=== Television ===
Year	Title	Credited as		Ref.
Year	Title	Director	Writer	Ref.
2022	Somebody	Yes	Yes	
TBA	Scandal	Yes	Yes	
