= The Advocate: A Missing Body =

- Poster
- Directed by: Heo Jong-ho
- Written by: Lee Gong-ju; Choi Kwan-young; Heo Jong-ho; Gu In-hoe; Kim Chang-woo
- Produced by: Seo Young-hee; Kim Hyun-jung; Park Ji-sung; Im Sang-jin; Kim Nam-su
- Starring: Lee Sun-kyun; Kim Go-eun; Im Won-hee
- Cinematography: Kim Ji-yong
- Edited by: Shin Min-kyung
- Music by: Mowg
- Production company: CJ E&M
- Distributed by: CJ Entertainment
- Release date: October 8, 2015
- Running time: 116 minutes
- Country: South Korea
- Language: Korean
- Box office: US$7.6 million

The Advocate: A Missing Body (Korean: 성난 변호사; RR: Seongnan byeonhosa; lit. 'Angry Lawyer') is a 2015 South Korean courtroom thriller-comedy film co-written and directed by Heo Jong-ho.

== Plot ==
Byeon Ho-sung is a hotshot lawyer at a big law firm; with a nearly 100% win rate, his life motto is "Winning is justice, and I am the winner." After Byeon wins a lawsuit for a large conglomerate pharmaceutical company, its chairman Moon Ji-hoon asks him to defend Moon's chauffeur Kim Jeong-hwan, who is suspected to have murdered a female college student named Han Min-jeong. A pool of blood was found at the crime scene where Kim was apprehended, but a body has not been found and there are no witnesses.

Kim insists that he and the victim were dating, but passionate rookie prosecutor Jin Sun-min believes that he was stalking Han. Just when Byeon is close to successfully contradicting Jin's claims and winning the case as he always does, his client abruptly confesses in court on the last day of the trial that he killed Han. Furious at his humiliation and even accused of tampering with evidence, Byeon uncharacteristically embarks on a search for the truth and teams up with Jin. But as he digs deeper, Byeon begins to uncover clues that may link the case back to Moon.

== Cast ==
- Lee Sun-kyun as Byeon Ho-sung
- Kim Go-eun as Jin Sun-min
- Im Won-hee as Office manager Park
- Jang Hyun-sung as Moon Ji-hoon
- Choi Jae-woong as Kim Jeong-hwan
- Kim Yoon-hye as Han Min-jeong
- Park Ji-young as Representative Joo
- Choi Kyu-hwan as Department head Yoo
- Im Cheol-hyeong as Subsection chief Yoon
- Lee Jun-hyeok as Gil-dong
- Bae Yoo-ram as Yong-sik
- Min Jin-woong as Gap-soo
- Lee Jong-gu as Kim Ik-tae
- Hong Sung-deok as Kim Man-seok
- Park Soo-eun as Se-young
- Kwak In-joon as Chief public prosecutor
- Hwang So-hee as Ha Yoo-ri
- Joo Seok-tae as David Lee

== Reception ==
By its third weekend, the film had earned ₩8.53 billion.
