= Cine21 Film Awards =

Annual South Korean event

Cine21 Awards
- Native name
- Hangul: 씨네21 영화상
- RR: Ssine21 yeonghwasang
- MR: Ssine21 yŏnghwasang
- Awarded for: Excellence in film
- Country: South Korea
- Presented by: Cine21
- First award: February 6, 1996; 30 years ago

The Cine21 Film Awards is a South Korean film awards ceremony established by Cine21, a comprehensive weekly video magazine published by The Hankyoreh newspaper. The awards, which recognized outstanding films and individuals from the magazine's inaugural year in 1995, officially launched in February 1996.

The first three awards ceremonies selected films from the preceding year in the early part of the following year. For the first two years (1st and 2nd editions), selections were made by regular readers, rather than by a panel of experts like critics and journalists. Beginning with the 3rd edition, to enhance professionalism, the selection method was changed, with Cine21's editorial staff serving as the selection committee.

From the 4th edition onward, the editorial staff continued as the selection committee, but the awards ceremony itself, held for the first three editions, was discontinued. Instead, Cine21 began announcing "Film of the Year" and "Filmmaker of the Year" in its year-end issue. This method remains in practice today.

== Past Major Award Winners (Award Ceremony) ==
=== 1st Cine21 Film Awards ===
The 1st Cine21 Film Awards, honoring the 1995 Film Grand Prize Award, was held on February 6, 1996, at 5 PM. The event took place at the East Building of LG Twin Towers in Yeongdeungpo-gu, Seoul, and was hosted by Kim Myung-gon and Jung Eun-im.

Category	Winner(s)	Work(s)	Ref.
Film of the Year		A Single Spark	
Director of the Year	Park Kwang-su	A Single Spark	
Actor of the Year	Hong Kyung-in	A Single Spark	
Actor of the Year	Ahn Sung-ki	The Eternal Empire	
New Director of the Year	Lee Min-yong	A Hot Roof	
New Actor of the Year	Han Suk-kyu	Doctor Bong	

=== 2nd Cine21 Film Awards ===
The 2nd Cine21 Film Awards, honoring the 1996 Film Grand Prize Award ceremony was held on February 4, 1997, at 5 PM, at the Yeon-gang Hall of the Doosan Art Center in Jongno-gu, Seoul. The event was hosted by Kim Myung-gon and Kim Sun-jae.

Category	Winner(s)	Work(s)	Ref.
Film of the Year		The Gingko Bed	
Director of the Year	Im Kwon-taek	Festival	
Actor of the Year	Ahn Sung-ki	Festival	
New Director of the Year	Kang Je-gyu	The Gingko Bed	
New Actor of the Year	Lee Jung-hyun	A Petal	

=== 3rd Cine21 Film Awards ===
On February 17, 1998, at 6 PM, the 3rd Cine21 Film Awards took place at the Hollywood Theater Blue Hall in Jongno-gu, Seoul, where the 1997 Film Grand Prize Award was presented.

Category	Winner(s)	Work(s)	Ref.
Cine21 Award	Seo Joon-sik	Executive Director, 2nd Human Rights Film Festival	
Cine21 Award	Myung Films	Contact	
Film of the Year		Green Fish	
New Director of the Year	Lee Chang-dong	Green Fish	
Yegam21 Award	Byun Hyuk	Interview	

== Filmmaker of the Year (Cine21 Year-end Issue) ==
=== 1998 ===
Cine21 No. 183 (Published: December 29, 1998)

Category	Winner(s)	Work(s)	Ref.
Film of the Year		Spring in My Hometown	
Director of the Year	Lee Kwang-mo	Spring in My Hometown	
Producer of the Year	Cha Seung-jae (Uno Film)	Christmas in August; Girls' Night Out	
Screenplay of the Year	Lee Kwang-mo	Spring in My Hometown	
Cinematography of the Year	Yoo Young-gil	Christmas in August	
Actor of the Year	Han Suk-kyu	Christmas in August	
Actress of the Year	Shim Eun-ha	Christmas in August; Art Museum by the Zoo	

=== 1999 ===
Cine21 No. 233 (Published: December 28, 1999)

Category	Winner(s)	Work(s)	Ref.
Film of the Year		Nowhere to Hide	
Director of the Year	Lee Myung-se	Nowhere to Hide	
Actor of the Year	Choi Min-sik	Happy End; Shiri	
Actress of the Year	Jeon Do-yeon	Happy End; The Harmonium in My Memory	
Screenplay of the Year	Jang Jin	The Spy	
Cinematography of the Year	Hong Kyung-pyo	Phantom: The Submarine	
Producer of the Year	Cha Seung-jae (Uno Film)	City of the Rising Sun; Phantom: The Submarine	

=== 2000 ===
Cine21 No. 283 (Published: December 26, 2000)

Category	Winner(s)	Work(s)	Ref.
Film of the Year		Peppermint Candy	
Director of the Year	Lee Chang-dong	Peppermint Candy	
Actor of the Year	Song Kang-ho	The Foul King; Joint Security Area	
Actor of the Year	Sul Kyung-gu	Peppermint Candy; The Warrior	
Actress of the Year	Lee Mi-yeon	Love Bakery; Pisces	
Screenplay of the Year	Lee Chang-dong	Peppermint Candy	
Cinematography of the Year	Jung Il-sung	Chunhyang	
Producer of the Year	Shim Jae-myung, Lee Eun (Myung Films)	Joint Security Area; The Isle	

=== 2001 ===
Cine21 No. 333 (Published: December 25, 2001)

Category	Winner(s)	Work(s)	Ref.
Film of the Year		Sorum	
Director of the Year	Hur Jin-ho	One Fine Spring Day	
Actor of the Year	Choi Min-sik	Failan	
Actress of the Year	Lee Young-ae	One Fine Spring Day; Last Present	
Screenplay of the Year	Song Hae-sung, Ahn Sang-hoon, Kim Hae-gon	Failan	
Cinematography of the Year	Kim Hyung-gu	One Fine Spring Day; Musa	
Producer of the Year	Oh Ki-min (Magical Film)	Take Care of My Cat	

=== 2002 ===
Cine21 No. 383 (Published: December 24, 2002)

Category	Winner(s)	Work(s)	Ref.
Film of the Year		On the Occasion of Remembering the Turning Gate	
Director of the Year	Lee Chang-dong	Oasis	
Actor of the Year	Sul Kyung-gu	Oasis; Public Enemy; Jail Breakers; The Bird Who Stops in the Air	
Actress of the Year	Moon So-ri	Oasis	
Screenplay of the Year	Lee Chang-dong	Oasis	
Cinematography of the Year	Jung Il-sung	Chi-hwa-seon	
Producer of the Year	Lee Tae-won (Taeheung Pictures)	Chi-hwa-seon	

=== 2003 ===
Cine21 No. 433 (Published: December 23, 2003)

Category	Winner(s)	Work(s)	Ref.
Film of the Year		Save the Green Planet!	
Director of the Year	Jang Joon-hwan	Save the Green Planet!	
Screenplay of the Year	Bong Joon Ho; Shim Sung-bo	Memories of Murder	
Cinematography of the Year	Kim Hyung-gu	Memories of Murder	
Producer of the Year	Cha Seung-jae (Sidus)	Memories of Murder; Save the Green Planet! Singles	
Actor of the Year	Song Kang-ho	Memories of Murder	
Actress of the Year	Moon So-ri	A Good Lawyer's Wife	
New Actor of the Year	Park Hae-il	Memories of Murder; Jealousy Is My Middle Name; Scent of Love	
New Actress of the Year	Im Soo-jung	A Tale of Two Sisters...ing	

=== 2004 ===
Cine21 No. 484 (Published: December 28, 2004)

Category	Winner(s)	Work(s)	Ref.
Film of the Year		Repatriation	
Director of the Year	Kim Dong-won	Repatriation	
Actor of the Year	Baek Yoon-sik	The Big Swindle	
Actress of the Year	Jeon Do-yeon	My Mother, the Mermaid	
Screenplay of the Year	Choi Dong-hoon	The Big Swindle	
Cinematography of the Year	Kim Hyung-gu	Rikidōzan	
Cinematography of the Year	Hong Kyung-pyo	Taegukgi	
New Actor of the Year	Gang Dong-won	Temptation of Wolves	
New Actor of the Year	Jae Hee	3-Iron	
New Actress of the Year	Soo Ae	A Family	

=== 2005 ===
Cine21 No. 534 (Published: December 27, 2005)

Category	Winner(s)	Work(s)	Ref.
Film of the Year		Tale of Cinema	
Director of the Year	Hong Sang-soo	Tale of Cinema	
Actor of the Year	Hwang Jung-min	You Are My Sunshine	
Actress of the Year	Jeon Do-yeon	You Are My Sunshine	
Screenplay of the Year	Lee Won-jae	Blood Rain	
Cinematography of the Year	Kim Woo-hyung	The President's Last Bang	
Producer of the Year	Jang Jin (Film It Suda)	Welcome to Dongmakgol; Murder, Take One	
New Actor of the Year	Ha Jung-woo	The Unforgiven	
New Actress of the Year	Kim Ji-soo	This Charming Girl	

=== 2006 ===
Cine21 No. 584 (Published: December 26, 2006)

Category	Winner(s)	Work(s)	Ref.
Film of the Year		Woman on the Beach	
Director of the Year	Bong Joon Ho	The Host	
Actor of the Year	Song Kang-ho	The Host	
Actress of the Year	Kim Hye-soo	Tazza: The High Rollers	
Screenplay of the Year	Lee Hae-young, Lee Hae-jun	Like a Virgin	
Cinematography of the Year	Kim Hyung-gu	Woman on the Beach; The Host	
Producer of the Year	Choi Yong-bae (Cheongeoram)	The Host	
New Director of the Year	Jo Chang-ho	Peter Pan's Formula	
New Actor of the Year	Ryu Deok-hwan	Like a Virgin	
New Actress of the Year	Go Hyun-jung	Woman on the Beach	

=== 2007 ===
Cine21 No. 634 (Published: December 25, 2007)

Category	Winner(s)	Work(s)	Ref.
Film of the Year		Secret Sunshine	
Director of the Year	Im Kwon-taek	Beyond the Years	
Actor of the Year	Song Kang-ho	Secret Sunshine; The Show Must Go On	
Actress of the Year	Jeon Do-yeon	Secret Sunshine	
Screenplay of the Year	Lee Chang-dong	Secret Sunshine	
Cinematography of the Year	Jo Yong-kyu	Secret Sunshine	
Cinematography of the Year	Kim Sung-tae	With a Girl of Black Soil; Boundary	
Producer of the Year	Kim Jong-won (Film Company Kino)	Beyond the Years	
New Director of the Year	Yoon Sung-ho	Milky Way Liberation Front	
New Actor of the Year	Daniel Henney	My Father	
New Actress of the Year	Cha Soo-yeon	Passing Rain	

=== 2008 ===
Cine21 No. 684 (Published: December 23, 2008)

Category	Winner(s)	Work(s)	Ref.
Film of the Year		Night and Day	
Director of the Year	Kim Jee-woon	The Good, the Bad, the Weird	
Actor of the Year	Ha Jung-woo	The Chaser; Beastie Boys; My Dear Enemy	
Actress of the Year	Gong Hyo-jin	Crush and Blush	
Screenplay of the Year	Na Hong-jin	The Chaser	
Screenplay of the Year	Lee Kyoung-mi	Crush and Blush	
Cinematography of the Year	Lee Mo-gae	The Good, the Bad, the Weird	
Producer of the Year	Kim Soo-jin (Film Company Bidangil)	The Chaser	
New Director of the Year	Na Hong-jin	The Chaser	
New Actor of the Year	Kang Ji-hwan	Rough Cut	
New Actress of the Year	Park Bo-young	Scandal Makers	

=== 2009 ===
Cine21 No. 734 (Published: December 22, 2009)

Category	Winner(s)	Work(s)	Ref.
Film of the Year		Mother	
Director of the Year	Bong Joon Ho	Mother	
Actor of the Year	Song Kang-ho	Thirst	
Actress of the Year	Kim Hye-ja	Mother	
Screenplay of the Year	Bong Joon Ho, Park Eun-gyo	Mother	
Cinematography of the Year	Hong Kyung-pyo	Mother	
Producer of the Year	Go Young-jae (Studio Nareumdo)	Old Partner	
New Director of the Year	Lee Yong-ju	Possessed	
New Actor of the Year	Yang Ik-june	Breathless	
New Actress of the Year	Baek Jin-hee	Bandhobi	

=== 2010 ===
Cine21 No. 785 (Published: December 28, 2010)

Category	Winner(s)	Work(s)	Ref.
Film of the Year		Poetry	
Director of the Year	Hong Sang-soo	Hahaha; Oki's Movie	
Actor of the Year	Won Bin	The Man from Nowhere	
Actress of the Year	Seo Young-hee	Bedevilled	
Screenplay of the Year	Lee Chang-dong	Poetry	
Cinematography of the Year	Lee Mo-gae	I Saw the Devil	
Producer of the Year	Lee Tae-heon (Opus Pictures)	The Man from Nowhere	
New Director of the Year	Jang Cheol-soo	Bedevilled	
New Actor of the Year	Song Sae-byeok	The Servant	
New Actress of the Year	Lee Min-jung	Cyrano Agency	

=== 2011 ===
Cine21 No. 835 (Published: December 27, 2011)

Category	Winner(s)	Work(s)	Ref.
Film of the Year		The Day He Arrives	
Director of the Year	Hong Sang-soo	The Day He Arrives	
Actor of the Year	Kim Yoon-seok	The Yellow Sea; Punch	
Actress of the Year	Tang Wei	Late Autumn	
New Actor of the Year	Lee Je-hoon	Bleak Night; The Front Line	
New Actress of the Year	Yoo Da-in	Re-encounter	
Screenplay of the Year	Park In-je	Moby Dick	
Cinematography of the Year	Kim Woo-hyung	Late Autumn; The Front Line	
Producer of the Year	Shim Jae-myung (Myung Films)	Leafie, A Hen into the Wild	
New Director of the Year	Yoon Sung-hyun	Bleak Night	

=== 2012 ===
Cine21 No. 885 (Published: December 25, 2012)

Category	Winner(s)	Work(s)	Ref.
Film of the Year		In Another Country	
Director of the Year	Chung Ji-young	National Security	
Actor of the Year	Lee Byung-hun	Masquerade	
Actress of the Year	Jo Min-su	Pietà	
Screenplay of the Year	Lee Yong-ju	Architecture 101	
Cinematography of the Year	Kim Tae-kyung	Eungyo	
Producer of the Year	Choi Yong-bae (Cheongeoram)	26 Years	
New Director of the Year	Lee Kwang-kuk	Romance Joe	
New Actor of the Year	Jo Jung-suk	Architecture 101; Almost Che	
New Actress of the Year	Kim Go-eun	Eungyo	

=== 2013 ===
Cine21 No. 935 (Published: December 24, 2013)

Category	Winner(s)	Work(s)	Ref.
Film of the Year		Nobody's Daughter Haewon	
Director of the Year	Bong Joon Ho	Snowpiercer	
Actor of the Year	Song Kang-ho	Snowpiercer; The Face Reader; The Attorney	
Actress of the Year	Jung Yu-mi	Our Sunhi	
Screenplay of the Year	Shin Yeon-shick	The Russian Novel	
Cinematography of the Year	Choi Young-hwan	The Berlin File	
Producer of the Year	Lee Choon-yeon (Cine 2000)	The Terror Live	
New Director of the Year	Kim Byeong-woo	The Terror Live	
New Actor of the Year	Yeo Jin-goo	Hwayi: A Monster Boy	
New Actress of the Year	Jung Eun-chae	Nobody's Daughter Haewon	

=== 2014 ===
Cine21 No. 985 (Published: December 23, 2014)

Category	Winner(s)	Work(s)	Ref.
Film of the Year		Hill of Freedom	
Director of the Year	Zhang Lü	Gyeongju	
Actor of the Year	Susumu Terajima	Hill of Freedom	
Actress of the Year	Chun Woo-hee	Han Gong-ju; Cart	
Screenplay of the Year	Kim Seong-hun	A Hard Day	
Cinematography of the Year	Choi Chan-min	Kundo: Age of the Rampant	
Producer of the Year	Shim Jae-myung (Myung Films)	Cart	
New Director of the Year	Lee Su-jin	Han Gong-ju	
New Actor of the Year	Park Yoo-chun	Sea Fog	
New Actress of the Year	Chun Woo-hee	Han Gong-ju; Cart	

=== 2015 ===
Cine21 No. 1035 (Published: December 22, 2015)

Category	Winner(s)	Work(s)	Ref.
Film of the Year		Right Now, Wrong Then	
Director of the Year	Ryoo Seung-wan	Veteran	
New Director of the Year	Hong Seok-jae	Socialphobia	
Actor of the Year	Yoo Ah-in	Veteran; The Throne	
Actress of the Year	Jeon Do-yeon	The Shameless	
New Actor of the Year	Byun Yo-han	Socialphobia; Madonna	
New Actress of the Year	Park So-dam	The Silenced; The Priests	
Screenplay of the Year	Jo Cheol-hyun, Oh Seung-hyun, Lee Song-won	The Throne	
Cinematography of the Year	Kang Gook-hyun	The Shameless	
Producer of the Year	Han Jae-duk (Sanai Pictures)	The Shameless	

=== 2016 ===
Cine21 No. 1085 (Published: December 20, 2016)

Category	Winner(s)	Work(s)	Ref.
Film of the Year		The Handmaiden	
Director of the Year	Park Chan-wook	The Handmaiden	
Actor of the Year	Lee Byung-hun	Inside Men; The Age of Shadows; The Magnificent Seven	
Actress of the Year	Kim Min-hee	The Handmaiden	
Screenplay of the Year	Shin Yeon-shick	Dongju: The Portrait of a Poet	
Cinematography of the Year	Chung Chung-hoon	The Handmaiden	
Producer of the Year	Lim Seung-yong (Yong Film)	The Handmaiden; Luck Key	
New Director of the Year	Yoon Ga-eun	The World of Us	
New Actor of the Year	Koo Kyo-hwan	Beaten Black and Blue	
New Actress of the Year	Kim Tae-ri	The Handmaiden	

=== 2017 ===
Cine21 No. 1135 (Published: December 19, 2017)

Category	Winner(s)	Work(s)	Ref.
Film of the Year		On the Beach at Night Alone	
Director of the Year	Hong Sang-soo	On the Beach at Night Alone	
Director of the Year	Kim Hyun-seok	I Can Speak	
Actor of the Year	Sul Kyung-gu	The Merciless	
Actress of the Year	Na Moon-hee	I Can Speak	
Screenplay of the Year	Hwang Dong-hyuk	The Fortress	
Cinematography of the Year	Kim Ji-yong	The Fortress	
Producer of the Year	Kim Hong-baek (Hong Film)	The Outlaws	
New Director of the Year	Jo Hyun-hoon	Jane	
New Actor of the Year	Lee Ga-seop	The Seeds of Violence	
New Actress of the Year	Choi Hee-seo	Anarchist from Colony	

=== 2018 ===
Cine21 No. 1185 (Published: December 19, 2018)

Category	Winner(s)	Work(s)	Ref.
Film of the Year		Burning	
Director of the Year	Lee Chang-dong	Burning	
Director of the Year	Jang Joon-hwan	1987: When the Day Comes	
Actor of the Year	Kim Yoon-seok	1987: When the Day Comes	
Actress of the Year	Han Ji-min	Miss Baek	
Screenplay of the Year	Kim Kyung-chan	1987: When the Day Comes	
Cinematography of the Year	Hong Kyung-pyo	Burning	
Producer of the Year	Won Dong-yeon (Realies Pictures)	Along with the Gods: The Two Worlds; Along with the Gods: The Last 49 Days	
New Director of the Year	Jeon Go-woon	Microhabitat	
New Actor of the Year	Sung Yoo-bin	Last Child	
New Actress of the Year	Jeon Yeo-been	After My Death	

=== 2019 ===
Cine21 No. 1236 (Published: December 24, 2019)

Category	Winner(s)	Work(s)	Ref.
Film of the Year		Parasite	
Director of the Year	Bong Joon-ho	Parasite	
Actor of the Year	Song Kang-ho	Parasite	
Actress of the Year	Lee Jung-eun	Parasite; Another Child	
New Director of the Year	Kim Bo-ra	House of Hummingbird	
New Actor of the Year	Jung Hae-in	Tune in for Love; Start-Up	
New Actress of the Year	Park Ji-hoo	House of Hummingbird	
Foreign Film of the Year		The Irishman	
Screenplay of the Year	Bong Joon-ho; Han Jin-won	Parasite	
Cinematography of the Year	Hong Kyung-pyo	Parasite	
Producer of the Year	Kang Hye-jung; Filmmaker R&K	Svaha: The Sixth Finger; Exit	

=== 2020 ===
Cine21 No. 1286 (Published: December 22, 2020)

Category	Winner(s)	Work(s)	Ref.
Film of the Year		The Woman Who Ran	
Director of the Year	Jung Jin-young	Me and Me	
Actor of the Year	Yoo Ah-in	#Alive; Voice of Silence	
Actress of the Year	Kim Min-hee	The Woman Who Ran	
New Director of the Year	Yoon Dan-bi	Summer Night	
New Actor of the Year	Kim Jun-hyung	Education	
New Actress of the Year	Kang Mal-geum	Lucky Chan-sil	
Screenplay of the Year	Lee Ji-min; Woo Min-ho	The Man Standing Next	
Cinematography of the Year	Hong Kyung-pyo	Deliver Us from Evil	
Producer of the Year	Jang Won-seok	Beasts Clawing at Straws; Intruder; Me and Me	
Foreign Film of the Year		Portrait of a Lady on Fire	

=== 2021 ===
Cine21 No. 1336 (December 21, 2021 - December 28, 2021)

Category	Winner(s)	Work(s)	Ref.
Film of the Year		In Front of Your Face	
Director of the Year	Ryoo Seung-wan	Escape from Mogadishu	
Actor of the Year	Sul Kyung-gu	The Book of Fish	
Actress of the Year	Moon So-ri	Three Sisters	
New Director of the Year	Hong Seung-eun	Aloners	
New Actor of the Year	Jung Jae-kwang	Not Out	
New Actress of the Year	Lee Yoo-mi	Hostage: Missing Celebrity; Young Adult Matters	
Scriptwriter of the Year	Kim Se-gyeom	The Book of Fish	
Producer of the Year	Kang Hye-jung	Escape from Mogadishu; Hostage: Missing Celebrity	
Cinematographer of the Year	Choi Young-hwan	Escape from Mogadishu; Hostage: Missing Celebrity	
Foreign Film of the Year		First Cow	

=== 2022 ===
Cine21 No. 1385 (December 13, 2022 - December 20, 2022)

Category	Winner(s)	Work(s)	Ref.
Series of the Year		Extraordinary Attorney Woo	
Director of the Year	Kim Hee-won	Little Women	
Actor of the Year	Son Suk-ku	My Liberation Notes	
Actress of the Year	Park Eun-bin	Extraordinary Attorney Woo	
New Actor of the Year	Choi Hyun-wook	Twenty-Five Twenty-One; Weak Hero Season 1	
New Actress of the Year	Lee Yeon	Juvenile Justice; Weak Hero Season 1	
Screenplay of the Year	Moon Ji-won	Extraordinary Attorney Woo	
Series Staff of the Year	Ryu Seong-hie; Lee Na-kyung	Little Women	
Producer of the Year	Lee Sang-baek	Extraordinary Attorney Woo	

Cine21 No. 1386 (2022-12-20 ~ 2022-12-27)

Category	Winner(s)	Work(s)	Ref.
Film of the Year		Decision to Leave	
Director of the Year	Park Chan-wook	Decision to Leave	
Actor of the Year	Park Hae-il	Decision to Leave	
Actress of the Year	Tang Wei	Decision to Leave	
Screenwriter of the Year	Jeong Seo-kyeong; Park Chan-wook	Decision to Leave	
New Director of the Year	Kim Se-in	Apartment with Two Women	
New Actor of the Year	Roh Jae-won	Missing Yoon	
New Actress of the Year	Yang Mal-bok	Apartment with Two Women	
Cinematographer of the Year	Kim Ji-young	Decision to Leave	
Producer of the Year	Han Jae-dok (Sanai Pictures)	The Hunt	
Foreign Film of the Year		Drive My Car	

=== 2023 ===
Cine21 No. 1435 (December 12, 2023 - December 19, 2023).

Category	Winner(s)	Work(s)	Ref.
Series of the Year		Moving	
Director of the Year	Park In-je	Moving	
Actor of the Year	Namkoong Min	My Dearest	
Actress of the Year	Park Bo-young	Daily Dose of Sunshine	
New Actor of the Year	Lee Jung-ha	Moving	
New Actress of the Year	Go Youn-jung	Moving	
Screenplay of the Year	Kim Eun-sook	The Glory	
Staff of the Year	Dalpalan (Music Director)	Moving	
Producer of the Year	Jang Kyung-ik	Moving	

Cine21 No. 1436 (December 19 to 26, 2023)

Category	Winner(s)	Work(s)	Ref.
Film of the Year		The Host	
Director of the Year	Um Tae-hwa	Concrete Utopia	
Actor of the Year	Jung Woo-sung	12.12: The Day	
Actress of the Year	Jung Yu-mi	Sleep	
New Director of the Year	Yu Jason	Sleep	
New Actor of the Year	Hong Xa-bin	Hwaran	
New Actress of the Year	Kim Si-eun	Next Sohee	
Screenplay of the Year	July Jung	Next Sohee	
Staff of the Year	Jo Hyung-rae (Cinematographer)	Concrete Utopia	
Producer of the Year	Byun Seung-min	Concrete Utopia	
Foreign Film of the Year		The Fabelmans	

=== 2024 ===
Cine21 No. 1486 (December 17, 2024 - December 24, 2024)

Category	Winner(s)	Work(s)	Ref.
Series of the Year		Doubt	
Director of the Year	Song Yeon-hwa	Doubt	
Actor of the Year	Han Suk-kyu	Doubt	
Actress of the Year	Jung Ryeo-won	The Midnight Romance in Hagwon	
New Actor of the Year	Nam Yoon-su	Love in the Big City	
New Actress of the Year	Chae Won-bin	Doubt	
Screenplay of the Year	Jeon Go-woon, Lim Dae-hyung	LTNS	
Staff of the Year	Jung Jae-hyung	The Atypical Family	
Producer of the Year	Choi Tae-seok	Love in The Big City	

Cine21 No. 1487 (December 24, 2024 - December 31, 2024)

Category	Winner(s)	Work(s)	Ref.
Film of the Year		A Traveler's Needs	
Director of the Year	Jang Jae-hyun	Exhuma	
Actor of the Year	Jo Jung-suk	Pilot	
Actress of the Year	Kim Go-eun	Exhuma, Lovestruck in the City	
New Director of the Year	Oh Jung-min	House of the Seasons	
New Actor of the Year	Noh Sang-hyun	Lovestruck in the City	
New Actress of the Year	Lee Myung-ha	Mimang	
Screenplay of the Year	Kim Da-min	FAQ	
Staff of the Year	Lee Mo-gae	Exhuma	
Producer of the Year	Kim Young-min	Exhuma	
Foreign Film of the Year		Close Your Eyes	

=== 2025 ===
Cine21 No. 1537 (December 23, 2025 - December 30, 2025)

Category	Winner(s)	Work(s)	Ref.
Series of the Year		Our Unwritten Seoul	
Director of the Year	Jo Young-min	You and Everything Else	
Actor of the Year	Ryu Seung-ryong	The Dream Life of Mr. Kim	
Actress of the Year	Park Bo-young	Our Unwritten Seoul	
New Actor of the Year	Choo Young-woo	The Trauma Code: Heroes on Call	
New Actress of the Year	Bang Hyo-rin	Aema	
Screenplay of the Year	Lee Kang	Our Unwritten Seoul	
Staff of the Year	Ryu Seong-hie and Choi Ji-hye	When Life Gives You Tangerines	
Producer of the Year	Pan Entertainment	When Life Gives You Tangerines	

Cine21 No. 1538

Category	Winner(s)	Work(s)	Ref.
Film of the Year		Master of the World	
Director of the Year	Yoon Ga-eun	Master of the World	
Actor of the Year	Lee Byung-hun	No Other Choice	
Actress of the Year	Lee Hae-young	The Old Woman with the Knife	
New Director of the Year	Park Jun-ho	3670	
New Actor of the Year	Jo Yoo-hyun	3670	
New Actress of the Year	Seo Su-bin	Master of the World	
Screenplay of the Year	Lee Ran-hee	3rd Year, 2nd Semester	
Producer of the Year	Kim Se-hoon	Master of the World	
Cinematographer of the Year	Hong Kyung-pyo	Harbin	
Foreign Film of the Year		One Battle After Another	

== See also ==
- Cine21
