= The Assassin(s) =

2026 South Korean crime thriller film

- Theatrical release poster
- Hangul: 암살자(들)
- RR: Amsalja(deul)
- MR: Amsalcha(tŭl)
- Directed by: Hur Jin-ho
- Written by: Kwon Ki-joon; Lee Ji-min
- Produced by: Kim Won-guk
- Starring: Yoo Hae-jin; Park Hae-il; Lee Min-ho
- Cinematography: Lee Mo-gae
- Edited by: Kim Ha-na; Kim Woo-hyun
- Music by: Jo Yeong-wook
- Production company: Hive Media Corp
- Distributed by: Hive Media Corp
- Release dates: September 16, 2026 (TIFF); September 23, 2026 (South Korea)
- Running time: 131 minutes
- Country: South Korea
- Language: Korean
- Budget: $12.1 million
- Box office: $25.3 million

The Assassin(s) (Korean: 암살자(들)) is a 2026 South Korean crime political thriller film directed by Hur Jin-ho. Starring Yoo Hae-jin, Park Hae-il, and Lee Min-ho, the film is set in 1974 and follows the attempted assassination of Korean president Park Chung Hee on August 15 of that year.

The film premiered at the Toronto International Film Festival on September 16, 2026. It was released in South Korea on September 23 by Hive Media Corp after its world premiere.

== Premise ==
Dramatizing the aftermath of the assassination of South Korea's first lady Yuk Young-soo on Liberation Day in 1974, the film explores certain unresolved parts of the case and is the first film adaptation of this historical event.

== Cast ==
- Yoo Hae-jin as Park Cheol-gu, a police superintendent at Jungbu Police Station
- Park Hae-il as Kim Jae-hwan, an editor of a newspaper's social affairs department
- Lee Min-ho as Han Young-il, a rookie reporter
- Choi Yu-ri as Choi Seung-hwa, a high school choir member
- Ryu Hye-young as Seo Yoon-hee, social affairs department reporter
- Kim Dae-myung as Man-seop, social affairs department reporter
- Bae Seong-woo as Song Min-ho, editor-in-chief
- Park Ji-hwan as Lee Hyeon-do, forensic team chief
- Jung Woo-sung as Han Sang-il, Young-il's older brother
- Shim Eun-kyung as Lee Kang-ja, an aide
- Park Hoon as Kim Sang-pil, KCIA agent
- Ryu Kyung-soo as Choi Kyung-doo, KCIA agent
- Park Jeong-min as Moon Tae-kwang, based on Mun Se-gwang
- Uhm Ji-won as Kim Hee-ja, Cheol-gu's wife
- Park Hae-joon as Moon Tae-seon
- Shin Hyun-been as Kyeong-ah
- Park Sung-hoon as Kim Hak-su
- Chang Ryul as Ko Dong-bae
- Yoo Yeon-seok as Maeda

== Production ==
In a January 2026 interview with Cine21, director Hur Jin-ho stated that principal photography had been completed in 68 shooting days and that the film was in post-production.

Dexter Studios handled the film's digital color correction and sound work in a collaboration with its audio-specialist partner, LiveTone. Through color and sound, the studios sought to evoke the atmosphere of the 1970s era and convey the tension surrounding the historical events.

== Release ==
The Assassin(s) had its world premiere at the Toronto International Film Festival on September 16, 2026.

It will open the 37th Singapore International Film Festival on October 21, 2026.

It was released in South Korean theaters in Chuseok holidays by Hive Media Corp on September 23, in Dolby Atmos format.

== Reception ==
=== Critical response ===
On the review aggregator Rotten Tomatoes website, the film has an approval rating of 100% based on 10 reviews, with an average rating of 7.8/10.

Tim Grierson of Screen Daily praised the film for becoming increasingly intense and angry as the story unfolds. Grierson opined that its layered investigation makes the narrative progressively more compelling and engaging.

=== Box office ===
The Assassin(s) topped overall advance ticket sales, with a total surpassing 240,000 tickets on September 23 at Korean box-office. The film was released on 1415 screens and registered the highest opening-day gross with 134,466 viewers, taking top spot in overall box-office rankings surpassing The Odyssey. The film surpassed 1 million viewers on fourth day of its release on September 26, with a cumulative audience of 1,057,760. Over its opening weekend, the film grossed $8.2 million across 1,532 screens, drawing 1,119,154 viewers and topped the Korean box office in ticket sales. It crossed 2 million viewers on eleventh day of its release on October 3, with a cumulative audience of 2,045,474.

As of October 18, 2026, the film has grossed US$23,977,060 from 3,249,178 admissions.

=== Accolades ===
Award	Date of ceremony	Category	Recipient(s)	Result	Ref.
Toronto International Film Festival	September 20, 2026	International People's Choice Award	The Assassin(s)	2nd Runner-up	
Korean Association of Film Critics Awards	November 4, 2026	Top 10 Films of the Year	The Assassin(s)	Won	
Blue Dragon Film Awards	November 25, 2026	Best Film	The Assassin(s)	Pending	
Blue Dragon Film Awards	November 25, 2026	Best Director	Hur Jin-ho	Pending	
Blue Dragon Film Awards	November 25, 2026	Best Actor	Park Hae-il	Pending	
Blue Dragon Film Awards	November 25, 2026	Best Supporting Actor	Lee Min-ho	Pending	
Blue Dragon Film Awards	November 25, 2026	Best Art Direction	Kim Byung-han	Pending	

== Historical accuracy ==
The film became the subject of controversy over allegations of historical distortion, particularly regarding its suggestion that the Park Chung Hee administration may have been involved in the 1974 assassination of First Lady Yuk Young-soo. Park Ji-man, son of Park Chung Hee, commented that he has "never seen [his] father cry like that" on the day Yuk Young-soo died. He has strongly argued against the claim that Park was involved in the assassination, saying that if he had wanted to assassinate her, he could have done so anywhere else. He also criticized the filmmakers, saying that "[he] never imagined they would release a movie that makes people hate each other."

Former MBC president Choi Seung-ho criticized the film for presenting the incident in a way that could lead viewers to speculate that Park was behind the shooting, saying that suspecting Park of having ordered the killing of his wife was disrespectful. The filmmakers rejected the allegations, stating that the film was a fictionalized reconstruction based on historical records and that it did not identify any particular person as being behind the incident or present its fictional hypotheses as historical fact.
