= Toronto International Film Festival International People's Choice Award =

Canadian annual film award

The Toronto International Film Festival International People's Choice Award is an annual film award, presented by the Toronto International Film Festival to films from outside North America.

The award was introduced for the first time at the 2025 Toronto International Film Festival.

Barry Hertz of The Globe and Mail criticized the newly introduced award when it was first announced at the 2025 Cannes Film Festival, stating that it "feels unnecessary, perhaps even exclusionary in a backwards way" and it is "...isolating any “international” film into what can only be seen as a lesser-than siloed category." In practice, an international film can still be named winner of the main People's Choice Award, but an international film that does so is removed from the international award standings to ensure that two different films are named.

== Winners and runners-up ==
| Year | Film | Director(s) | Ref |
|---|---|---|---|
| 2025 | No Other Choice | Park Chan-wook | |
| 2025 | Sentimental Value | Joachim Trier | |
| 2025 | Homebound | Neeraj Ghaywan | |
| 2026 | Elsinore | Simon Stone | |
| 2026 | Possible Love | Lee Chang-dong | |
| 2026 | The Assassin(s) | Hur Jin-ho | |
