= Kim Yuna (singer) =

South Korean singer and songwriter (born 1974)

Kim Yoon-ah
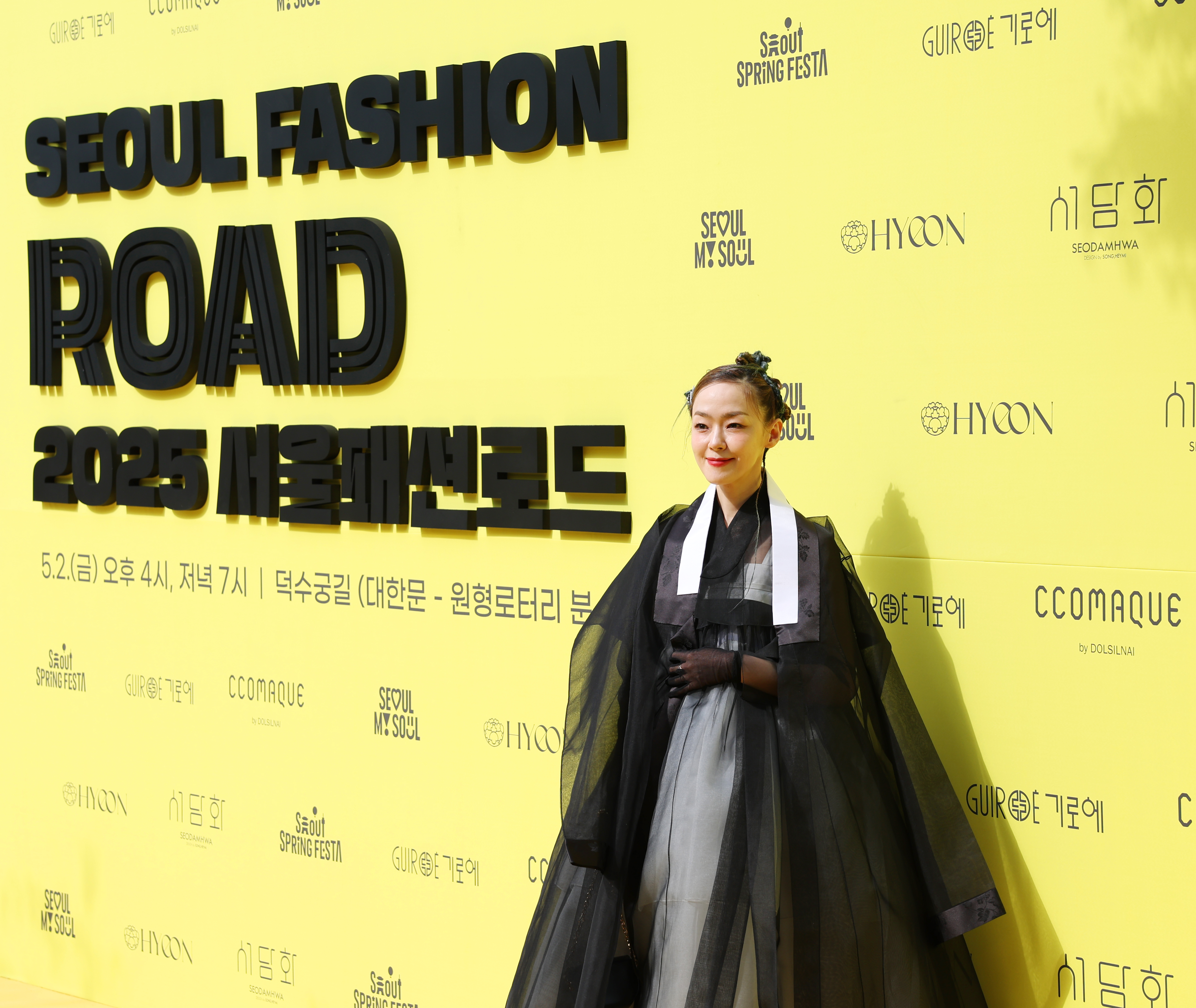
- Kim in 2025
- Born: Kim Yoon-ah; March 11, 1974 (age 52); Seoul, South Korea
- Occupations: Singer; songwriter
- Years active: 1997–present
- Spouse: Kim Hyung-gyu (m. 2006)
- Children: 1
- Musical career
- Genres: Modern rock; Alternative rock; Ballad
- Instruments: Vocal; piano; guitar
- Label: Interpark INT
- Member of: Jaurim
- Website: loveyuna.co.kr

Korean name
- Hangul: 김윤아
- RR: Gim Yuna
- MR: Kim Yuna

Kim Yuna (Korean: 김윤아; born March 11, 1974), also known as Kim Yoon-ah, is a South Korean singer and songwriter. She is known as the lead singer in the modern rock group Jaurim. She also released several solo albums. She also made her musical theatre debut in 2015, playing the role of Mrs. Danvers from 2015 Korean production of Rebecca the musical, though after the premiere performance she left the production due to severe laryngitis.

== Personal life ==
In 2006, she married dentist & television presenter Kim Hyung-gyu. They have one child.

== Discography ==
=== Studio albums ===
| Title | Album details | Peak chart positions | | Sales |
| Title | Album details | KOR RIAK (Note: The Recording Industry Association of Korea (RIAK) released monthly rankings and sales figures for physical albums and singles from August 1998 to September 2008.) | KOR Circle (Note: The Gaon Music Chart began releasing weekly rankings for physical albums and digital songs in 2010.) | Sales |
|---|---|---|---|---|
| Shadow of Your Smile | Released: November 20, 2001; Label: T Entertainment; Format: CD, cassette | — | — | |
| Glass Mask (유리가면) (琉璃假面) | Released: March 5, 2004; Label: T Entertainment; Format: CD, cassette | 3 | — | KOR: 110,551 |
| 315360 | Released: April 26, 2010; Label: Soundholic; Format: CD, LP, digital download | N/A | 69 | |
| The Pain of Others (타인의 고통) | Released: December 8, 2016; Label: Interpark; Format: CD, LP, digital download | N/A | 14 | KOR: 3,014 |
| Tales of Sensuality (관능소설) | Released: April 25, 2024; Label: Interpark; Format: CD, digital download | N/A | 64 | KOR: 2,260 |
"—" denotes releases that did not chart or were not released in that region.

=== Live albums ===
| Title | Album details | Peak chart positions | Sales |
| Title | Album details | KOR | Sales |
|---|---|---|---|
| 행복한 사랑은 없네 | Released: April 7, 2023; Label: Interpark; Formats: CD, LP, digital download | 89 | KOR: 987 |

=== Singles ===
| Title | Year | Peak chart positions | Album |
| Title | Year | KOR | Album |
|---|---|---|---|
| "Wall" (담) | 2001 | — | Shadow Of Your Smile |
| "Nocturne" (야상곡) (夜想曲) | 2004 | 33 | Glass Mask |
| "Tokyo Blues" (도쿄 블루스) | 2010 | 69 | 315360 |
| "Going Home" | 2010 | 26 | 315360 |
| "Kyrie" (키리에) | 2016 | — | The Pain of Others |
| "Goodbye" (안녕) | 2016 | — (Note: "Goodbye" did not enter the Circle Digital Chart, but it peaked at number 97 on the component Download Chart.) | The Pain of Others |
| "Glass" (유리) | 2016 | — | The Pain of Others |
| "Dream" (꿈) | 2016 | — | The Pain of Others |
| "An End" (종언) | 2024 | — | Tales of Sensuality |
| "La Vie Rosée" (장밋빛 인생) | 2024 | — | Tales of Sensuality |
"—" denotes releases that did not chart or were not released in that region.

=== Soundtrack appearances ===
| Title | Year | Album |
|---|---|---|
| "One Fine Spring Day" (봄날은 간다) | 2001 | One Fine Spring Day OST |
| "Lucid Dream" (자각몽) | 2015 | The Missing OST |
| "The Road" (길) | 2016 | Signal OST |
| "Small White Flower" (작은 꽃) | 2016 | The Last Princess OST |
| "Voice" (목소리) | 2017 | Voice OST |
| "Kite" (연) | 2017 | Saimdang, Light's Diary OST |
| "To You" (나인 너에게) | 2018 | Mother OST |
| "Days Without Tears" (눈물 아닌 날들) | 2018 | Mr. Sunshine OST |
| "Be Colored" (물들어간다) | 2020 | Tell Me What You Saw OST |
| "Nobody Knows" | 2020 | The Cursed OST |
| "Lonely Sailing" (고독한 향해) | 2020 | The World of the Married OST |
| "Winner" | 2021 | Mine OST |
| "Under the Blossom Shadow" (붉은 꽃그늘 아래서) | 2021 | Lost OST |

== Filmography ==
=== Film ===
| Title | Year | Role | Notes |
|---|---|---|---|
| Interview | 2000 | Herself | |
| The President's Last Bang | 2004 | Singer | |
| The Wonder Years | 2007 | Seol-young | |

=== Television series ===
| Year | Title | Role | Notes |
|---|---|---|---|
| 2009 | MBC Best Theater: "Dreamers" | | one act-drama |
| 2017 | Voice | Club Fever DJ | Cameo (episode 9) |

=== Television shows ===
| Year | Title | Role | Notes | Ref. |
|---|---|---|---|---|
| 2023 | Black Box on Earth | Cast Member | in Spain | |

=== Radio shows ===
| Year | Title | Role | Notes | Ref. |
|---|---|---|---|---|
| 2022 | Bae Chul-soo's Music Camp | Special DJ | August 15 | |

== Awards and nominations ==
| Award | Year | Category | Nominee / Nominated work | Result | Ref. |
|---|---|---|---|---|---|
| Korean Music Awards | 2005 | Musician of the Year | Kim Yuna | Nominated | |
| Korean Music Awards | 2011 | Female Musician of the Year – Netizen Vote | Kim Yuna | Won | |
| Korean Music Awards | 2011 | Best Pop Album | 315360 | Nominated | |
| Korean Music Awards | 2025 | Best Pop Album | Tales of Sensuality | Nominated | |
