= Park Geun-ryeong =

South Korean politician (born 1954)

- 박근령
- Born: June 30, 1954 (age 72); Seoul, South Korea
- Education: College of Music, Seoul National University
- Spouse(s): Ryu Cheong (m. 1982; div. 1983) Shin Dong-wook (1968) (m. 2008)
- Parents: Park Chung Hee (father); Yuk Young-soo (mother)
- Relatives: Park Geun-hye (sister); Park Ji-man (brother)

Korean name
- Hangul: 박근령
- Hanja: 朴槿令
- RR: Bak Geunryeong
- MR: Pak Kŭllyŏng

Park Geun-ryeong (Korean: 박근령, born June 30, 1954) is a South Korean politician. She is the daughter of former President Park Chung Hee and his wife, Yuk Young-soo. Her elder sister is former President Park Geun-hye. She worked with various organizations, had significant disputes with her elder sister, and was convicted of fraud with a suspended sentence.

== Early life ==
Park was born as the second daughter of Park Chung Hee and his wife, Yuk Young-soo. At the time of her birth, her father had returned to Korea after completing his studies at the US Army Artillery School's Advanced Military Course and was serving as the commander of the 2nd Corps Artillery Division with the rank of Brigadier General. Park Chung Hee returned to Korea on June 27, and Geun-ryeong's birthday was three days later on the 30th. Her original name was Park Geun-yeong (朴槿映), but she changed it to Park Seo-yeong (朴書永) in 1993 and then back to Park Geun-ryeong (朴槿令) in 2004. She graduated from Cheongun Elementary School, Gyeonggi Girls' Middle School, Gyeonggi Girls' High School, and Seoul National University's College of Music. Park and her elder sister learned to play the piano when they were little.

== Career ==
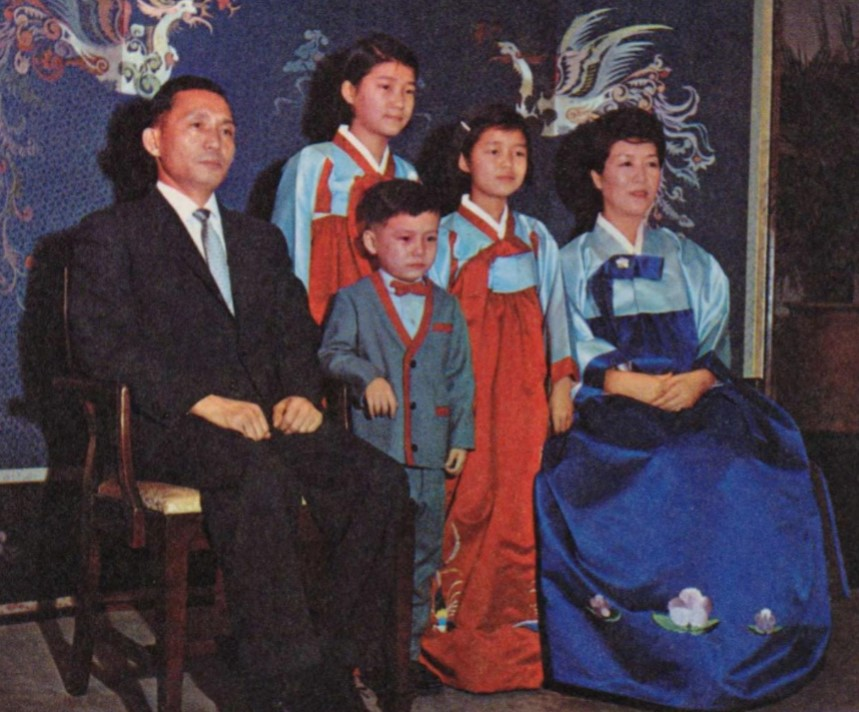
Park Chung Hee, Park Geun-hye, Park Ji-man, Park Geun-ryeong, and Yuk Young-soo, c. 1964

After her mother, Yuk Young-soo, was assassinated in 1974, and her father, Park Chung Hee, was assassinated in 1979, she left the Blue House with her siblings born to Yuk Young-soo and moved to her private residence in Sindang-dong, Seoul.

In the Fall of 1982, she married Ryu Cheong, a businessman and the eldest son of Ryu Chan-woo, the president of Poongsan Metal, but they divorced six months later. She then lived in the United States from April 1986 to 1990.

Afterwards, she was elected as the Vice President of the Yook Young Foundation (also known as Korea Children's Center), and when her older sister Park Geun-hye stepped down from her position as the President of the Yook Young Foundation, she assumed the position as the President in December 1990. Park had accused her elder sister of not detecting mismanagement among its board members. In 2004, Park herself had to step down because of scandals among her own staff at Yook Young. This made the rift between the sisters even worse. In 1992, she founded the Children's Traffic Safety Association and served as its president. In 1997, she joined the Liberty Korea Party.

In the Fall of 2006, she met Shin Dong-wook (1968), who was 13 years her junior, and they got engaged in February of the following year. Shin is an adjunct professor of advertising and marketing at Baekseok Culture University. That same month she was removed from the Yook Young Foundation and had to use credit from a bank for living expenses. Despite opposition and persuasion from some acquaintances, she married Shin Dong-wook on October 13, 2008. Shin was sued for defamation by Park's elder sister, Park Geun-hye.

Afterwards, he served as the Chairman of Muse Bank Co., Ltd., Senior Advisor to the Republican Party, President of the Korea Disaster Relief Association, President of the Korea Women's Baduk Federation, President of the Bio Sports Headquarters, Honorary Chairman of the Peace and Unification Research Institute, Honorary President of the Korean Volleyball Federation, and Honorary President of the Korea Special Protection Martial Arts Association.

Park Geun-ryeong had been at odds with her older sister Park Geun-hye for a long time since the death of her father, former President Park Chung Hee, but on December 14, 2012, she declared her support for Park Geun-hye in the 2012 South Korean presidential election.

== Controversy ==
In a special interview with the portal site Niconico, she sparked controversy by stating that South Korea's continued apology to Japan for its past history was unfair, that not visiting the shrine was immoral, and that neighboring countries criticizing Japan's shrine visits amounted to interference in their internal affairs. She then maintained her previous position in an interview with announcer Kim Joo-ha, further fueling the controversy.

On June 29, 2017, Park and her elder sister were tried in separate trials on different charges. Park Geun-ryeong was accused of fraud and violating the Attorneys-at-Law Act. She was accused of reeiving about 100 million South Korean won (~ US $89,000) from a social-welfare group head in exchange for using her influence to aid a government contract. She denied wrongdoing and claimed she had returned the money. She was convicted and the Supreme Court of Korea upheld her sentence of one year and six months in prison, suspended for two years. She was also sentenced to 160 hours of community service and a fine of 100 million won. She was not sent to jail because the money had been recovered.

== TV portrayals ==
- 1995 - MBC's 4th Republic (TV series) - portrayed by Jo Eun-kyung
- 2005 - MBC's 5th Republic - portrayed by Jeon Soo-ji
