= Born to Kill (1996 film) =

- Theatrical release poster
- Hangul: 본 투 킬
- RR: Bon tu kil
- MR: Pon t'u k'il
- Directed by: Jang Hyun-soo
- Written by: Jang Hyun-soo; Lee Mu-young; Song Hae-sung
- Produced by: Lee Sun-yeol
- Starring: Jung Woo-sung; Shim Eun-ha
- Cinematography: Jung Il-sung
- Edited by: Park Gok-ji; Yun Ja-won
- Music by: Byeon Seong-yong
- Release date: April 20, 1996
- Running time: 110 minutes
- Country: South Korea
- Language: Korean

Born to Kill (Korean: 본 투 킬) is a 1996 South Korean action film directed by Jang Hyun-soo, starring Jung Woo-sung and Shim Eun-ha. This film pioneered the Korean Noir genre and brought it into vogue in the mid-1990s.

== Plot ==
The life of a professional killer becomes complicated when he falls in love with his neighbor, Soo-ha, a bargirl.

== Cast ==
- Jung Woo-sung ... Kil
- Shim Eun-ha ... Soo-ha
- Cho Kyung-hwan
- Kim Hak-cheol
- Lee Ki-yeol
- Myung Gye-nam
- Lee Mi-sook
- Lee Jung-hak
- Kim Kwang-il
- Kim Si-a
