= Won Il =

Won Il 원일
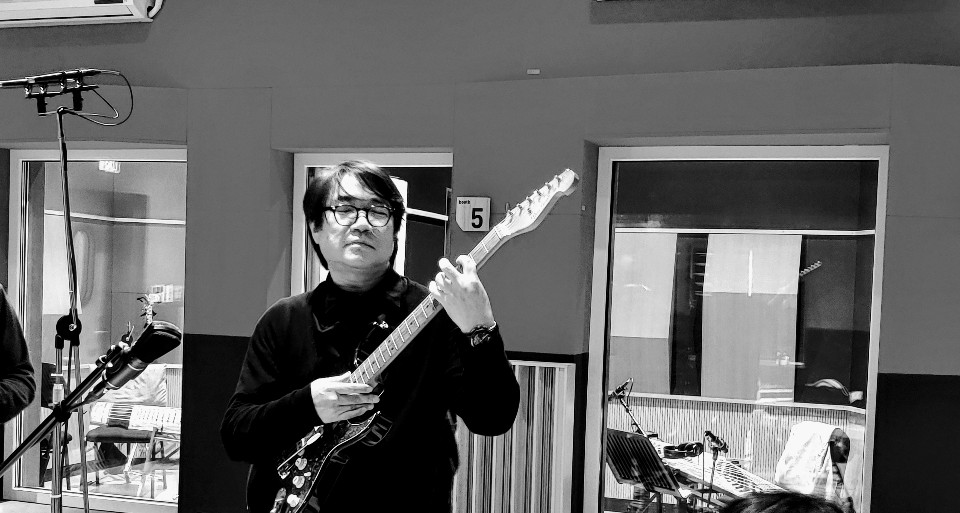

Background information
- Born: October 19, 1967 (age 58); Seoul, South Korea
- Occupations: Korean traditional music Player, Composer, Conductor, Producer
- Instruments: Piri, Percussions, Electronic gears
- Website: www.facebook.com/il.won.il/

Korean name
- Hangul: 원일
- Hanja: 元一
- RR: Won Il
- MR: Wŏn Il

Won Il (Korean: 원일), stylized as IL WON, is a Korean modern musician mainly based on Korean traditional music. He won four times at the Grand Bell Awards which is often regarded as South Korea's Academy Awards.

== Early life ==
WON IL was born in Seoul on October 19, 1967. In elementary school, he hit all things that sounded like a musical instrument: hollow gears, such as broken pots, crushed pots, planks, sticks, iron pipes, or bamboo, dig through holes. He mainly played snare drums and recorders, and in middle school he started playing the clarinet in the band. The clarinet he met while blowing the iron pipe was so fascinating that he swelled his mouth to swell.

Thanks to these musical activities, the emotion of deficiency and discomfort that had to be felt in the absence of the birth mother in the home environment as a child was transformed into musical energy. In connection with the band's senior who attended the Korean traditional music high school, Won entered the National Traditional Music High School to major in flute, and the teacher of the original Samulnori who taught Samulnori, Kim Yong-bae recognized the mischievous 'player' in the Korean traditional music high school.

In that way, Kim Yong-bae's presence and music greatly influenced his music identity. While serving as a class leader and a school president at the Gugak High School, he was fail the college admission to Seoul National University. He established a career as a major in Korean classical music and flute major (1986 student number), led by teacher Jeong Jae-guk, a master of contemporary flutes, and entered the path of a traditional music player in earnest as a minor in percussion including Samulnori.

In college, in an attempt to play accompaniment music in real-time during a traditional dance performance, 'Sorisawi' with his participation as Flute-Percussion was established to try to put into practice the contemporary agony with the music.

At that time, there were also contacts with famous celebrities of the time, who were classified as so-called 'Undongkwon' such as Park Chi-eum, Kim Min-ki, and Yoo In-taek. At the time, in 1988, when the Seoul Olympics were held, on the occasion of Korean Liberation Day, on August 15, the festival of 'Unification Song Hanmadang' was held. At the 'Art Theater Hanmadang', opened as a theater dedicated to Korean traditional play (CEO Yoo In-taek), the festival led by Park Chi-um was the first musical accompaniment to Korean traditional music. 'Sorisawi' performed all accompaniment music as Korean traditional music.

== Main career ==
- Recipient of Daechwita / Piri Jeongak, National Intangible Cultural Properties
- 1993–2004 Representative leader, world music group “Puri”
- 2000–2002 Music Director, National Dance Company of Korea
- 2002–2015 Professor of Dp. Composition in School of Korean Traditional Arts (in Korea National University of Arts)
- 2004–2011 Representative leader, Korean Music Ensemble “Wind Cape”
- 2006–2015–2018 Music General Director, HwaEom Spiritual Music Ritual
- 2009–2010 Music Director, 21st Century Korean Music Project
- 2010 Advisor of Dp. Performance, Seoul Arts Center Council
- 2012–2015 National Orchestra of Korea, Artistic Director
- 2017–2018 Artistic Director, Yeowoorak Festival in National Theater of Korea
- 2018 Music Director, Opening & Closing Ceremony of 2018 Winter Olympics
- 2019 General Director, Opening & Closing Ceremony of the 100th Korean National Sports Festival
- 2020–present Artistic Director, Gyeonggi Province Sinawi Orchestra

== Awards ==
Year	Award	Category	Recipient	Result
1990	National Gugak Contest	Grand Prize	Won-il	Won
1994	Korea Dance Association Awards	Music	Jok-bo	Won
1995	Korea Institute of Creative Arts Awards	New Generation Best Composer Selection	Kkot-sang-yeo	Won
1996	Grand Bell Awards	Best Music	Petals	Won
1999	Grand Bell Awards	Best Music	Spring in My Hometown	Won
1999	Chunsa Film Art Awards	Best Music	Spring in My Hometown	Won
1999	Korean Association of Film Critics Awards	Best Music	Spring in My Hometown	Won
1999	Today's Young Artist Awards	Traditional Korean Arts	Won-il	Won
2000	Grand Bell Awards	Best Music	The Uprising	Won
2000	KBS Korean Traditional Music Awards	Composition	Won-il	Won
2008	Grand Bell Awards	Best Music	Hwang Jin Yi	Won
2015	Best Artist of This Year	Music	Won-il	Won

== Works ==
=== Discography ===
Discography by Won Il
Year	Artist	Title	Label
1996	Won Il	A petal	Samsung Music
1997	Uhuhboo Project	Breakeven point	DongA Records
1997	Won Il	Asura	AK
1997	Dosirak Commandos	Yummy omnibus Dosirak Commandos	DongA Records/King Records
1998	Won Il	Spring In My Hometown	Woongjin Media
1999	Puri	移動	Yejeon Media
1999	Won Il	The Uprising	Sony Music
1999	Won Il	The Ring virus	Sony Music
2000	Dosirak Commandos	圖時樂特功隊2 Behind Story	Doremi Records
2003	Won Il	Wonderful Days	Fluxus Music/Seoul Records
2003	Won Il	Wonderful Days [Special Edition]	Fluxus Music
2007	Puri	Neo Sound Of Korea	Mnet Media
2011	Baramgot	Baramgot	Universal Music

=== Soundtrack ===
Year	Work	Awards	Ref.
1995	Cinema on the Road (Korean: 한국영화 씻김; RR: Hangungnyeonghwa Ssitgim)		
1996	A Petal	Grand Bell Awards, BEST MUSIC	
1998	The Power of Kangwon Province		
1998	Spring in My Hometown	Grand Bell Awards, BEST MUSIC	
1999	The Ring Virus		
1999	The Uprising	Grand Bell Awards, BEST MUSIC	
2002	On the Occasion of Remembering the Turning Gate		
2003	Sky Blue		
2003	A Hilarious Mourning (Korean: 오구; RR: Ogu)		
2003	Into the Mirror		
2005	O-Nu-Ri (Korean: 오늘이; RR: Oneuri)		
2006	Immortal Admiral Yi Sun-sin (TV series)		
2007	Hwang Jin Yi	Grand Bell Awards, BEST MUSIC	
2011	The Showdown		
2012	Gabi		

=== Major events ===
- Music director, closing ceremony of 2018 Winter Olympics
- General director, opening and closing ceremony of the 100th Korean National Sports Festival

== Filmography ==
=== Radio ===
- Won Il's Evam mayā śrutam (Korean: 원일의 여시아문; RR: Wonirui Yeosiamun) (Gugak FM, 2016-)

=== Television ===
- Fascinating Silkroad (Korean: 매혹의 실크로드; RR: Maehogui Silkeurodeu) (KBS1, 2019)
- JTBC lecture (Korean: 차이나는 클라스; RR: Chainaneun Keullaseu) 142nd episode (JTBC, 2020)

== Bibliography ==
- 동해안 진오귀굿 중 장수굿의 짜임새와 장단구조 : 청보장단을 중심으로, 2001.
- 음악적 발상의 원천으로서의 굿, 2011.
- 음대 나와서 무얼 할까, 2015. ISBN 9788970598246

== Artistic orientation ==
1. Popularity. From his early 'Puri' activity, in his performance, there was an enthusiastic response that was not normally seen in the traditional Korean music audience. In addition, he contributed to securing a young fan base of the Korean music industry by pursuing popular attempts that were not seen in the traditional music world, such as recording music with N.E.X.T, the popular music group, and PANIC O.S.T. By dividing the category of 'National Heritage', which was reinforced and expanded and reproduced by governmental logic such as strengthening national identity which is so-called 'Korean traditional music', he moved the public's attention to the category of 'contemporary music' where creators and enjoyers coexist in creative music genre.

2. Creativity. He is a National Intangible Cultural Property of Korea, and is also awarded the Grand Prize of the National Korean Traditional Contest hosted by the National Gugak Center in the 'Jeongak' field, which can be said to be the music that connects authentic Korean traditional music. However, as mentioned earlier, his role in the Korean traditional music world was not 'Guardian' but 'Innovation'. Beginning in high school, his creative activities continued to evolve and evolved, paying more attention to the needs of the market at the eye of the public rather than stuffed supplies, and contributed to broadening the boundaries of Korean traditional music creativity. Even now, he finds the creative principle of Korean music from native Korean word called 'Sinawi', the oldest Korean music term to replace creative music, and creates a new concept and phenomenon called 'Shin-A-wi (神 我 爲)'.

3. Extensibility. It is an indispensable element to elicit a new phase of access to the unspecified majority. Since childhood, the memories of learning snare drum and recorder, flute and clarinet, kkwaeng-gwali and janggu, and composition and production are imprinted on his genetic map and combined to suit the purpose as a sort of synthesizer, so that they can be output like MIDI. From his early music, represented by <Shinbatnori>, to his numerous artistic events, such as the release of numerous movie music OSTs, opening and closing ceremonies of PyeongChang Olympics and National Sports Festival, his artistic behavior was the convergence of individual music identities, between past and future, East and West genres.

4. Openness. He has been pursuing the 'open structure' of the performance, which is the biggest characteristic of Korean traditional music. It appears narrowly in the musical structure or stage operation of the work, and broadly in his activities and histories. From the fusion music activities of 'Puri' to professional management for European tours in Japan and other countries in the early 1990s, he has taken the method of stepping up the existing frame by the newly introduced elements rather than traditional principles or laws. By doing so, he opened his own experiential horizon. Rather than choosing to continue the institutional music power as a professor at the Korea National University of Arts and as an art director at the National Orchestra orchestra under the National Theater, he chose to take a new course to pursue spirituality and world music at the 'Hwaeom Music Festival' held at Hwaeomsa Temple in Gurye, Jeolla Province. It is a feature that can be seen in.

5. Spirituality. The intrinsic dimension and essential characteristic to be experienced as the ultimate value of his music is that he leads the spiritual experience of the subject through 'doing music'. When this is done jointly in the music field, it creates a magnetic field of greater influence, and this is the 'phenomena' to be observed in the 'Sinawi' project he has been trying to realize. This phenomenon created a multiplicity and atypical melody flow called Sinawi, which began with musical “live songs in the field”, and songs played in shamanism or at the theater. This is an attempt. Shortly after he was newly appointed as the artistic director of Gyeonggi Provincial Orchestra Orchestra under the Seoul Arts Center in 2020, the name of the representative orchestra of Gyeonggi-do, which is 25 years old, has been renamed as 'Gyeonggi Sinawi Orchestra'. Expression.
