= Shim Eun-ha =

South Korean actress (born 1972)

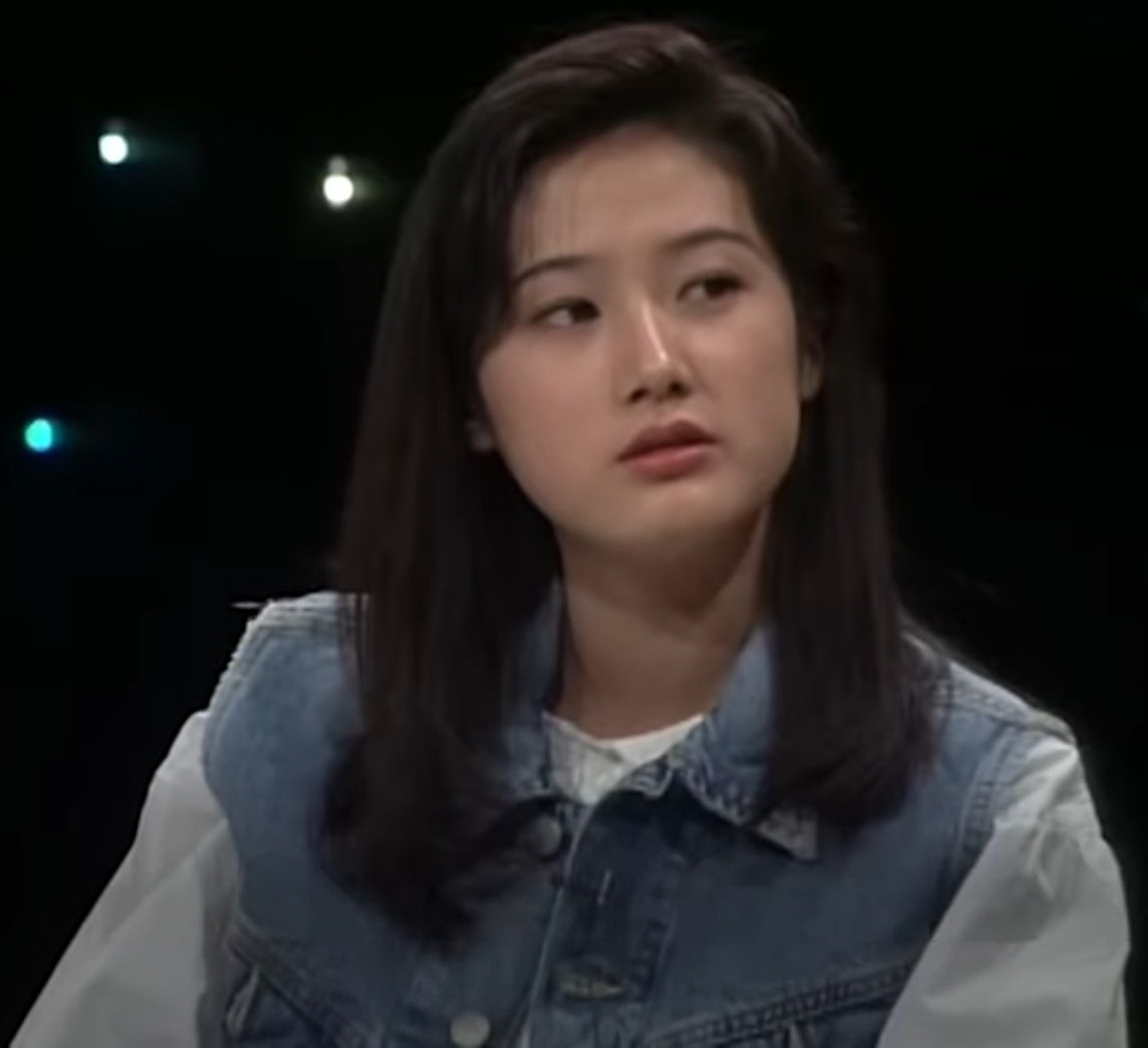
- Shim in 1994
- Born: September 23, 1972 (age 54); Seongnam, South Korea
- Years active: 1993–2000
- Spouse: Ji Sang-wook (m. 2005)
- Children: 2

Korean name
- Hangul: 심은하
- Hanja: 沈銀河
- RR: Sim Eunha
- MR: Sim Ŭnha

Signature
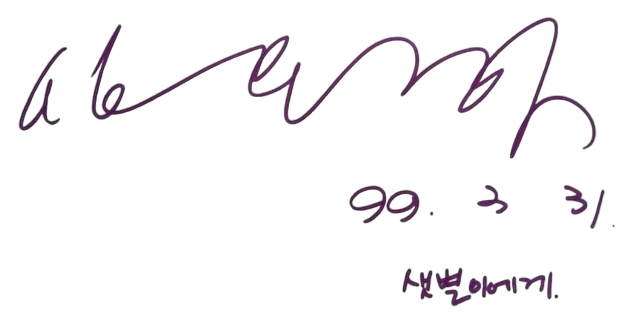

Shim Eun-ha (Korean: 심은하; born September 23, 1972) is a retired South Korean actress. She is widely regarded as one of the early figures associated with the title "Nation's First Love" due to her portrayals of pure and emotionally resonant characters in film and television.

Shim rose to popularity in the 1990s, starring in some of the highest-rated Korean dramas of all time, such as The Last Match (1994), M (1994), and Trap of Youth (1999). However, she is best known for her acclaimed performance in Hur Jin-ho's melodrama Christmas in August (1998), for which she swept the Best Actress awards. This was followed by another well-received turn in romantic comedy Art Museum by the Zoo (1998). Shim suddenly retired from show business after the Dogme 95 film Interview (2000), at the height of her fame in 2001, and her mystique solidified her status as the most beloved South Korean actress of that decade.

== Career ==
Shim Eun-ha made her acting debut in 1993 after being recruited by MBC. In 1994, she starred in the basketball-themed TV drama The Last Match, and quickly became the nation's most popular and talked-about star. After more forays into television (including the horror drama M) and two lesser-known films (including Born to Kill with Jung Woo-sung), she made a permanent mark on the film industry with her performance in Hur Jin-ho's modern-day classic Christmas in August (1998), as her performance in that film earned her the moniker "Nation’s First Love." Later that year Art Museum by the Zoo, which presented a more down-to-earth side of the actress, saw her win more critical praise for her acting abilities. Throughout this period, Shim consistently topped magazine polls as the most popular actress in the film industry.

In Trap of Youth (1999), Shim originated the anti-heroine in modern Korean dramas, when her innocent-looking character got revenge on the love who had betrayed her. It was enormously popular, with viewer ratings soaring to 35.7 percent.

She then reunited with Han Suk-kyu in Tell Me Something (1999), and their star power combined to create one of the most highly anticipated movies in Korean film history (though most viewers ultimately expressed disappointment at the film's convoluted narrative). The following year she appeared in Korea's first Dogme film Interview (2000) opposite Lee Jung-jae, which would end up being her last appearance.

== Post-retirement ==
In 2001, after rumors surfaced of an engagement which was later called off, Shim was chased and hounded for months by reporters from local tabloids and entertainment programs. Because of this, she decided to quit acting, citing a desire for an ordinary life. In the ensuing years, despite periodic rumors that she would resume her film career, Shim has tried her best to remain out of the public eye, studying in France and taking up painting.

== Personal life ==
In September 2005, Shim appeared in the news again when she announced in a press release that she was marrying Ji Sang-wook. The couple wed at a private ceremony attended by about 150 people at Aston House, Sheraton Grande Walkerhill Hotel in Seoul on October 18, 2005. At the time she reaffirmed that she would not return to acting. The couple have two daughters, the first born on March 2, 2006, and the second on November 28, 2007.

Having expressed regret that she hadn't pursued further education while she'd been acting, Shim entered the Korea National Open University in 2009 to study for a liberal arts degree. She then displayed her artwork at the 2009 Seoul Open Art Fair, where the Oriental ink-and-wash landscape paintings, done in classical Korean style, attracted attention for their exquisite detail. She sold her first painting at a fundraiser exhibit later that year.

After being appointed as spokesperson for the Liberty Forward Party, Shim's husband Ji unsuccessfully ran for mayor of Seoul in 2010. Ji subsequently joined the Saenuri Party and was elected a member of the National Assembly for Seoul in April 2016. Ji now joined Bareun Party.

== Filmography ==
=== Film ===
Year	English title	Korean title	Romanization	Role
1995	My Old Sweetheart	아찌 아빠	Ajji appa	Nam Yoo-ri
1996	Born to Kill	본 투 킬	Bon tu kil	Jung Soo-ha
1998	Christmas in August	8월의 크리스마스	Palweolui Keuriseumaseu	Kim Da-rim
1998	Art Museum by the Zoo	미술관 옆 동물원	Misulgwan yup dongmulwon	Lee Choon-hee
1999	The Uprising	이재수의 난	Lee Jae-su-eui nan	Il Sook-hwa
1999	Tell Me Something	텔 미 썸딩	Telmisseomding	Chae Soo-yeon
2000	Interview	인터뷰	In-teo-byoo	Lee Young-hee

=== Television series ===
Year	English title	Korean title	Romanization	Role	Network
1993	Three Families Under One Roof	한지붕 세가족		Yoo Ji-hee	MBC
1994	The Last Match	마지막 승부	Majimak Seungbu	Jung Da-seul	MBC
1994	MBC Best Theater: "Little Thief"	MBC 베스트극장 - 작은 도둑		Lee Jung-eun	MBC
1994	M	M		Park Ma-ri/Kim Joo-ri	MBC
1994	Shoal	여울목		Na Seung-ri	MBC
1995	Hotel	호텔	Ho-tel	movie actress (cameo)	MBC
1995	Sook-hee	숙희	Suk-hui	Kim Sook-hee	MBC
1996	1.5 Generation	1.5		Cha Hye-kyung	MBC
1996	TV Literature: "Between Heaven and Earth"	TV문학관 - 천지간	Cheonjigan	woman	KBS1
1996	Power of Love	사랑한다면	Saranghanda Myeon	Kim Young-hee	MBC
1997	Beautiful Lady	아름다운 그녀	Areumdawoon Geunyeo	Yoo Seon-young	SBS
1997	SBS 70-Minute Drama: "I Want"	SBS 70분드라마 - 나는 원한다	Naneun Wonhanda	Hong Young-ki	SBS
1998	White Nights 3.98	백야 3.98	Baekya 3.98	Anastasia Jang	SBS
1999	Trap of Youth	청춘의 덫	Cheongchunui Deot	Seo Yoon-hee	SBS

== Awards and nominations ==
Year	Award	Category	Nominated work	Result
1994	30th Baeksang Arts Awards	Best New Actress (TV)	The Last Match	Won
1994	Korea Best Dresser Swan Awards	Best Dressed, TV Actress category	—N/a	Won
1994	MBC Drama Awards	Best New Actress	The Last Match, M	Won
1995	16th Blue Dragon Film Awards	Best New Actress	My Old Sweetheart	Nominated
1996	34th Grand Bell Awards	Best New Actress	Born to Kill	Nominated
1996	17th Blue Dragon Film Awards	Best Leading Actress	Born to Kill	Nominated
1997	33rd Baeksang Arts Awards	Best Actress (Film)	Born to Kill	Nominated
1997	31st Tax Payer's Day	Prime Minister's Commendation	—N/a	Won
1998	34th Baeksang Arts Awards	Best Actress (Film)	Christmas in August	Won
1998	18th Korean Association of Film Critics Awards	Best Actress	Christmas in August	Won
1998	19th Blue Dragon Film Awards	Best Leading Actress	Christmas in August	Won
1998	19th Blue Dragon Film Awards	Popular Star Award	Christmas in August	Won
1998	1st Director's Cut Awards	Best Actress	Christmas in August	Won
1998	SBS Drama Awards	Top Excellence Award, Actress	White Nights 3.98	Nominated
1999	Asian Film Critics Association Awards	Best Actress	Christmas in August	Won
1999	36th Grand Bell Awards	Best Actress	Art Museum by the Zoo	Won
1999	36th Grand Bell Awards	Popularity Award	Art Museum by the Zoo	Won
1999	35th Baeksang Arts Awards	Best Actress (Film)	Art Museum by the Zoo	Nominated
1999	35th Baeksang Arts Awards	Best Actress (TV)	Trap of Youth	Won
1999	SBS Drama Awards	Grand Prize (Daesang)	Trap of Youth	Won
1999	SBS Drama Awards	Top Excellence Award, Actress	Trap of Youth	Nominated
1999	SBS Drama Awards	Top 10 Stars	Trap of Youth	Won
1999	SBS Drama Awards	Highest Popularity Award	Trap of Youth	Won
1999	20th Blue Dragon Film Awards	Best Leading Actress	Tell Me Something	Nominated
1999	20th Blue Dragon Film Awards	Popular Star Award	Tell Me Something	Won
2000	36th Baeksang Arts Awards	Best Actress (Film)	Tell Me Something	Nominated
2000	1st Korea Visual Arts Festival	Photogenic Award, Film Actress category	Tell Me Something	Won
2000	23rd Golden Cinematography Awards	Most Popular Actress	Tell Me Something	Won
2000	37th Grand Bell Awards	Best Actress	Tell Me Something	Nominated
2000	37th Grand Bell Awards	Popularity Award	Tell Me Something	Won
2000	1st Korean Film Festival	Best Actress	Tell Me Something	Won
2000	SBS Drama Awards	Big Star Award	—N/a	Won
2000	21st Blue Dragon Film Awards	Best Leading Actress	Interview	Nominated
2001	38th Grand Bell Awards	Popularity Award	Interview	Won

== See also ==
- Korean cinema
- Korean drama
