= Park Ji-man =

South Korean businessman and military officer (1958-)

- 박지만
- Born: December 15, 1958 (age 67); Seoul, Korea
- Education: Korea Military Academy
- Spouse: Seo Hyang-hee (m. 2004)
- Children: Park Se-hyeon; Park Jeong-hyeon; Park Ji-hyun; Park Soo-hyun
- Parents: Park Chung Hee (father); Yuk Young-soo (mother)
- Relatives: Park Geun-hye (sister); Park Geun-ryeong (sister)

Korean name
- Hangul: 박지만
- Hanja: 朴志晚
- RR: Bak Jiman
- MR: Pak Chiman

Park Ji-man (Korean: 박지만, born December 15, 1958) is the son (third child) of President Park Chung Hee and a professional business executive who is currently the chairman of the EG. After graduating from the 37th class of the Korea Military Academy, he served in the military for five years as an air defense instructor, (Note: Currently, the air defense branch is independent, but at the time it was attached to the artillery branch.) one of the artillery officer branches, and retired as an army captain in 1986. Afterwards, he was indicted six times for drug use and convicted five times, causing great social controversy.

== Early life ==
He was born in Sindang-dong, Seoul, as the only son and youngest child of Major General Park Chung Hee, the Chief of Staff of the 1st Army Command, and his wife Yuk Young- soo. He is an only son with three older sisters, one a half-sister. The eldest sister, Park Jae-ok, is not Yuk Young-soo's daughter, but the daughter of his ex-wife, Kim Ho-nam. His second older sister is Park Geun-hye, and his third older sister is Park Geun-ryeong. He attended Seoul Cheongun Elementary School and Baemun Middle School before entering Joongang High School. In 1974, when he was 16 and a freshman in high school, his mother Yuk Young-soo was assassinated by Moon Se-gwang at the National Theater of Korea in Jangchung-dong, where a National Liberation Day of Korea ceremony was being held. It is said that this incident caused a very difficult time for Park Ji-man.

Park graduated from Joongang High School in 1977 and entered the 37th class of the Korea Military Academy. It is said that the reason for entering the Korea Military Academy was not his father, Park Chung Hee, but rather his own will along with the recommendation of his homeroom teacher during his third year of high school. Park Ji-man's original goal was to enter Seoul National University, but after his mother passed away during his first year of high school, he wandered and his grades declined, so he changed his path. It is also said that he wanted to escape the confines of the Blue House life by entering the Korea Military Academy because he would no longer be surrounded by security guards.

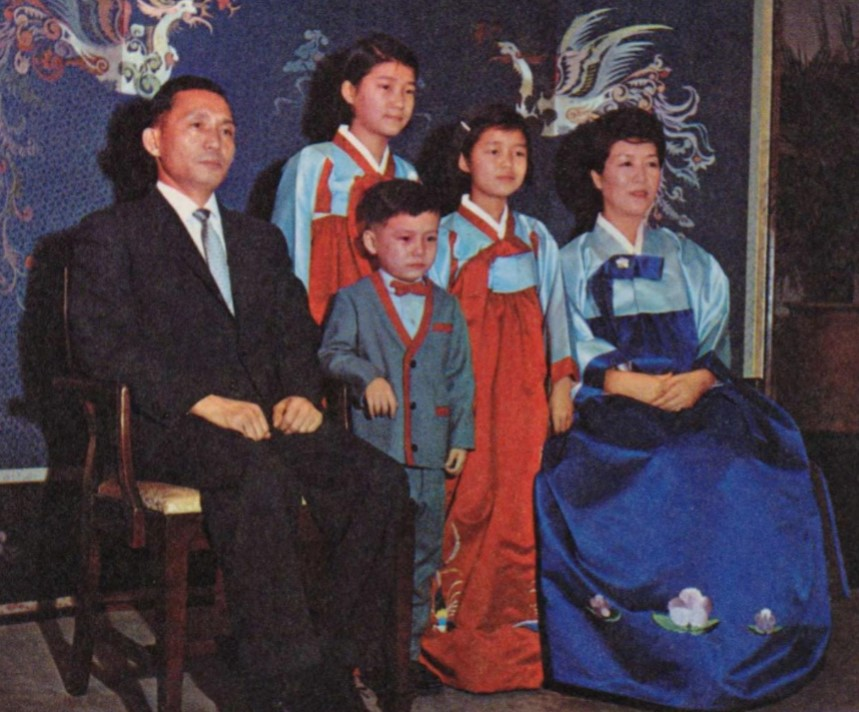
Park Chung Hee, Park Geun-hye, Park Ji-man, Park Geun-ryeong, and Yuk Young-soo, c. 1964

During his time as a cadet at the Korea Military Academy, Park Ji-man became a Christian through the evangelism of Noh Byung-cheon (35th class), who was two years his senior. He is said to have been a close follower of Noh. However, Park Ji-man engaged in many serious deviant behaviors during his cadet years, and a bigger problem was that even the instructors and the superintendent of the Korea Military Academy were unable to discipline him, causing many people to suffer. Noh Byung-cheon revealed in his book, "Park Chung-hee's Last Confession of Faith," that Noh Byung-cheon beat Park Ji-man around 20 times as a form of discipline. He wrote that Park Ji-man later regained his senses and became a model cadet. However, another ordeal befell Park Ji-man. On October 26, 1979, during his third year as a cadet, his father, Park Chung-hee, was shot and killed by Kim Jae-gyu, the director of the Korean Central Intelligence Agency.

== Military service ==
After receiving his bachelor's degree in 1981 and being commissioned as a second lieutenant in the Air Defense Artillery, he completed his basic military training (OBC) at the Air Defense Artillery School in Daegu. Thanks to Chun Doo-hwan's consideration, he was assigned to one of the most comfortable positions for an officer. However, he was driving drunk and which led to a traffic accident during his service, and due to the aftereffects, including two facial plastic surgeries, he completed only his mandatory service and retired from the Army as a captain in 1986.

== Post-military social activities ==
From 1989 to 2002, he was arrested several times on drug charges and showed signs of wandering for a while. During this time, Park Tae-jun, who had been close to Park Chung Hee since his days as a cadet at the military academy, volunteered to be his guardian and helped Park Ji-man get back on track.

Meanwhile, he served as a director of the Yook Young Foundation, and in 1991, he acquired Samyang Industries through the arrangement of Park Tae-jun. Samyang Industries changed its name to EG (corporate) when it was listed on KOSDAQ in 2000, and Park Ji-man serves as its chairman.

On December 14, 2004, he married Seo Hyang-hee, a lawyer 16 years his junior. The wedding ceremony, held at the Walkerhill Hotel in Seoul, was officiated by Pastor Kwak Seon-hee of Somang Presbyterian Church. The wedding was held in a small ceremony with minimal guests. The couple has four sons.

In 1997, during the 15th presidential election in the Republic of Korea, he supported Kim Dae-jung.

The eldest sister, Park Jae-ok, married Captain Han Byeong-gi, a former aide to her father, Park Chung Hee, in October 1958, two months before he was born.

The daughter of his cousin Park Young-ok and his cousin Kim Jong-pil is Kim Ye-ri (1951) (born 1951). Kim Ye-ri is Park Ji-man's niece, six years older than him (the same age as his older sister Park Geun-hye). Kim Ye-ri called her younger maternal uncle Park Ji-man "Mr. Ji-man." In addition, singer Eun Ji-won, a member of Sechs Kies, is his 5th cousin (maternal nephew).

== Incidents and accidents ==
=== Accusation and prosecution cases ===
In January 2005, Park filed a court injunction against the film Those People Back Then, claiming it defamed Park Chung Hee. In February of the same year, MK Pictures filed an objection to the injunction, and Park Ji-man filed a lawsuit seeking a screening ban and damages. In 2006, the Seoul Central District Court partially ruled in favor of the plaintiff, ordering the producers to pay Park Ji-man 100 million won of the 500 million won and censoring 3 minutes and 50 seconds, but dismissed the request for a screening ban. After appeals, the fine and censorship were rescinded but a disclaimer that the film was fictional was inserted.

On August 19, 2011, the Seoul Gangnam Police Station arrested Shin Dong-wook (1968), the husband of Park Geun-ryeong, Park Ji-man 's older sister, on charges of false accusation, including claiming that Park Ji-man's nephew and chief secretary kidnapped him to China in September 2010 and spread rumors that he had used drugs in China, and suing the two people. Shin Dong-wook also claimed that Park Ji-man's chief secretary and others kidnapped him to China in 2007 and attempted to kill him, and that Park Ji-man instigated this from behind the scenes, and claimed in an interview with the press that there was a recording of Park Ji-man attempting to kill him. Shin was sentenced to 18 months in prison.

=== Habitual drug use cases ===
Park Ji-man was caught using drugs six times between 1989 and 2002 , and was arrested five times.

- First arrest - indicted without detention on charges of commercial use of methamphetamine and cocaine in 1989.
- Second arrest - In 1991, he was arrested by the prosecution on charges of habitual use of methamphetamine and heroin. The reason for the arrest was that he was suspected of snorting or intravenously ingesting methamphetamine on four occasions in July, November, and December 1990, and January 1991.
- Third Caught - On December 25, 1993, Park Ji-man was arrested on charges of habitually using methamphetamine with prostitutes in red-light districts in Yeongdeungpo-dong and Cheongnyangni-dong, Seoul, on approximately 50 occasions since October 1992.
- Fourth Offense - On November 19, 1996, the Seoul District Prosecutors' Office's Violent Crimes Division arrested Park Ji-man on charges of violating the Psychotropic Substances Control Act. The reason for his arrest was his alleged habitual use of methamphetamine on approximately 50 occasions at his home, brothels, and hotels, including using it with prostitutes in a red-light district in Cheongnyangni-dong, Seoul.
- Fifth Offense - On February 2, 1998, the Seoul District Prosecutors' Office's Violent Crimes Unit arrested Park Ji-man on suspicion of administering methamphetamine, and subsequently detained him for violating the Psychotropic Substances Control Act. The reason for the arrest was that he allegedly injected methamphetamine using a syringe at his home in December 1997.
- Sixth Offense - On July 25, 2002, the Seoul District Prosecutors' Office's Narcotics Investigation Division sentenced Park Ji-man to two years and six months in prison, medical supervision, and a fine of 2.6 million won on charges of administering methamphetamine. The reason for the indictment was that he administered methamphetamine and had sexual relations with prostitutes on 12 occasions between August 2001 and April 2002 at brothels and motels in Seoul. He was arrested and indicted in May 2002.

== TV portrayals ==
- 1995 - MBC's 4th Republic (TV series) - portrayed by Jang Seong-won (actor)
- 2005 - MBC's 5th Republic - portrayed by Kim Nam-gil
