= Interview (2000 film) =

2000 film by Byun Hyuk

- Theatrical release poster
- Hangul: 인터뷰
- RR: Inteobyu
- MR: Int'ŏbyu
- Directed by: Byun Hyuk
- Written by: Byun Hyuk; Kwon Yong-guk; Oh Hyeon-ri; Jeong Jin-wan
- Produced by: Lee Chun-yeon
- Starring: Lee Jung-jae; Shim Eun-ha
- Cinematography: Kim Hyeong-gu
- Edited by: Kim Sang-bum
- Music by: Park Ho-jun
- Production company: Cine 2000
- Release date: April 1, 2000
- Running time: 108 minutes
- Country: South Korea
- Language: Korean

Interview (Korean: 인터뷰) is a 2000 South Korean romantic drama film written and directed by Byun Hyuk. The film follows Eun-seok (Lee Jung-jae), a documentary filmmaker preparing a documentary about love when he involves a young woman Young-hee (Shim Eun-ha), who works as a beauty assistant in a parlor shop, found in a tape filmed by Seok's assistant director Min-su (Kim Jung-hyun).

Interview was the seventh film to be made under the guidelines of Danish's avant-garde movement Dogme 95 to officially certified as a Dogme film (known as Dogme #7 - Interview), and the first Asian, and so far only, film (referred as "Asian Dogme") to produce under the Dogme rules known as "Vows of Chastity".

It was released on April 1, 2000; simultaneously, it marked Shim Eun-ha's final film role.

== Plot ==
Director Eun-seok is filming a documentary about love when he comes across footage shot by his assistant director, Min-su, and notices a young woman named Young-hee. Working as a hairdresser's assistant, Young-hee shares the story of her boyfriend, who has enlisted in the military's elite Baekgol Unit. Captivated by her, Eun-seok continues to film her. Though she refuses his request to film the salon, she allows him to accompany her on a visit to see her boyfriend. However, after returning from the brief trip, Eun-seok is overcome with despair and runs frantically across the Han River bridge.

The film then shifts back in time to a year earlier in Paris, where Eun-seok, a film student, is commissioned to shoot the rehearsal of a performance by Korean dancers. Through his camera, he captures the intense and passionate dance of a man and a woman.

== Cast ==
- Lee Jung-jae as Eun-seok
- Shim Eun-ha as Young-hee
- Cho Jae-hyun as Byung-kwon
- Kim Jung-hyun as Min-su
- Jang Ho-il as Jae-hyeok
- Lee Deok-jin as Jong-ho
- Stéphane Debac as Jerome
- Chu Sang-mi as Herself
- Kim Yuna as Herself

== Production ==
Development of the film started in September 1999, shots between South Korea and France, where Byun studied and graduated at French's film school La Femis two years ago (and later he shot in the graveyard scene at Sainte-Geneviève-des-Bois Russian Cemetery, where it found a gravestone reference to Lars von Trier's favorite filmmaker, Andrei Tarkovsky), for getting some lens this month as well as following the Dogme 95 guidelines from fellow Danish filmmakers, Lars von Trier and Thomas Vinterberg. According to Christopher Alford of Variety, the film was budgeted at $2 million, utilizing digital video and 35mm film in a style of story within a story about a director interviewing people discuss the intimate details of their lives.

=== Dogme 95 ===
Although Interview does not explicitly mention that it is registered as Dogma #7, it refers to a scheduled German film titled Broken Cookies, directed by von Trier's frequent collaborator Udo Kier, for his attempt to submitting into the manifesto as the seventh Dogme, but the film was never realized before ended up submitted by Byun's film instead.

== Reception ==
Several film critics received mixed reviews for the film's story. David Desser of SUNYP quotes: More daringly, Interview leaps between registers of past, present, and conditional, where some narrative may be fantasy or otherwise difficult to place within a coherent story outline. Derek Elley of Variety quotes: "A decent movie lies at the heart of the romantic drama Interview, an over-long feature debut by Daniel H. Byun that suffers from a bad case of first-film-itis. Attempting to cram in everything except The Meaning of Life, Byun alienates the viewer from pic's undoubted strengths and emphasizes its pretentious weaknesses. Unfortunately, the film is being marketed internationally in a discursive two-hour-plus version, which is a serious mistake".

In a negative review, Richard Kelly of The Independent criticized the film's narrative, quoting: "Worse, the plot is a lot of self-conscious maundering about a film student's romantic obsessions. For this viewer, Dogme films should be as uncouth as possible, as in parts of Festen and all of The Idiots". He also stated that the film violates four out of ten rules in the guidelines, which was laid out by the manifesto within its first five minutes; cramming in dolly shots and hidden cameras, uses of moody lighting, a director's credit, and non-diegetic background music (only one music used for the dance scene was composed by Ho-jun Park) as if purposefully endeavoring to fail the audition.
