= Yuk Young-soo =

First Lady of South Korea from 1962 to 1974

- 육영수
- Yuk in 1972

First Lady of South Korea
- In role 24 March 1962 – 15 August 1974; Acting until 17 December 1963
- President: Park Chung Hee
- Preceded by: Gong Deok-gwi
- Succeeded by: Park Geun-hye (acting)

Personal details
- Born: 29 November 1925 Okcheon County, Chūseihoku Province, Korea, Empire of Japan
- Died: 15 August 1974 (aged 48) Seoul, South Korea
- Cause of death: Assassination by gunshot
- Resting place: Seoul National Cemetery
- Spouse: Park Chung Hee (m. 1950)
- Children: Park Geun-hye; Park Geun-ryeong; Park Ji-man
- Education: Baehwa Women's High School

Korean name
- Hangul: 육영수
- Hanja: 陸英修
- RR: Yuk Yeongsu
- MR: Yuk Yŏngsu
- IPA: [juɡjʌŋsʰu]

Yuk Young-soo (Korean: 육영수; 29 November 1925 – 15 August 1974) was the wife of South Korean president Park Chung Hee and the mother of the 11th South Korean president Park Geun-hye. She was the first lady when Park was in office, from 1962 until she was killed in 1974 during an attempted assassination of her husband.

== Early life ==
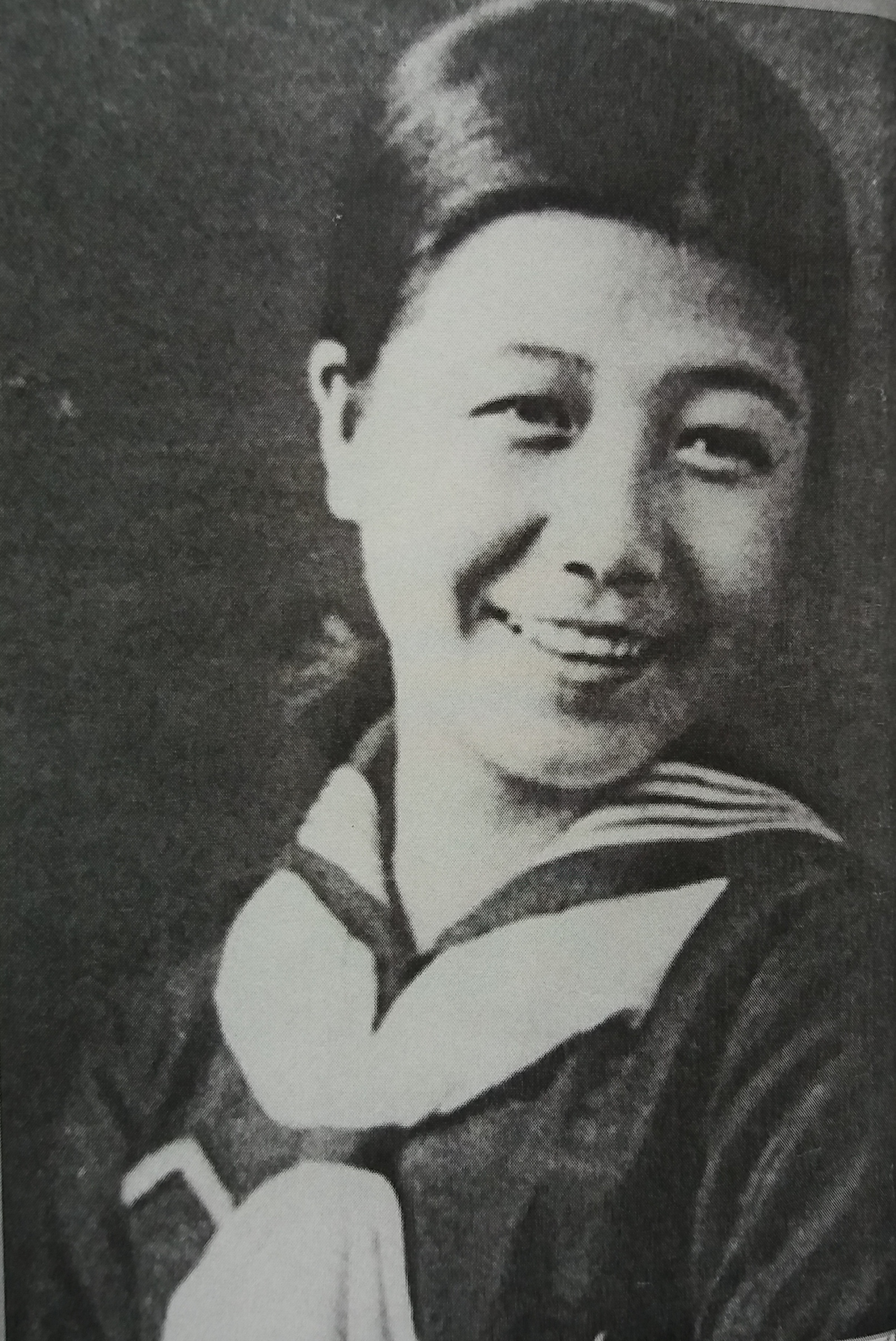
Yuk Young-soo during her youth (1935)

Yuk was born in Okcheon County, Chūseihoku Province, Korea, Empire of Japan, in 1925. She was the second of three daughters of a prosperous self-made landlord. She graduated from Paihwa Girls' High School. In August 1950, she met Park Chung Hee through a relative who was serving under Park. (Note: Keon, who was at the time a lieutenant colonel in the South Korean military.) On 12 December 1950, she married Park Chung-hee. While her mother supported her choice of husband, Yuk's father was against the match, so she married without his blessing.

== First Lady ==
When Park Chung-hee was in the mission as the chairman of the Supreme Council for National Reconstruction, Yuk Young-soo's main interest was handling civil complaints. Jeong Jae-hoon, a disciple and secretary of the First Lady's Office for six years, recalled:

"We have conversations with as many people as possible to collect public opinion on the streets, and dozens of complaints a day are left with instructions. I made them run."

Yuk Young-soo always made a simple impression on people regarding hanbok and elegance and was a sincere wife to her husband at home. She also took great interest in children and health, often visiting orphanages and nurseries to develop policies for children's health. During her husband's tenure, she mainly took care of receiving guests and dealing with complaints, although she wanted to do her part as "a revolutionary's wife." She was also involved with the Red Cross and with children with autism. In 1970, the construction of Children's Grand Park started and it opened the following year.

She was also close to the people and visited patients suffering from leprosy. She helped to start several self-support projects and visited the families of South Korean soldiers deployed to Vietnam to comfort and console them. In 1973, she undertook projects that saw the development of vocational training institutes for poor and disadvantaged youth. Because of the efforts of Yuk Young-soo, a vigorous social services are professional because the social welfare-oriented vocational training that have had to know glim of poverty. She also did not hesitate to try to influence her husband, especially in 1963, when, to resolve tensions with the American ambassador Samuel D. Berger, she invited him to the Blue House. Park Chung-hee then joked about it, going so far as to consider her "the first opposition party". In 1969, she created a private foundation with the aim of improving the well-being of South Korean children. In 1974, a mother who had been invited to the Blue House revealed that her child was suffering from facial paralysis. Yuk Young-soo found an acupuncture center for his treatment.

== Death ==
At 10:23 a.m., 15 August 1974, on the anniversary of the liberation of Korea, Yuk was shot by Mun Se-gwang, a Zainichi Korean and North Korean sympathizer, during an attempt by Mun to assassinate President Park Chung-hee.

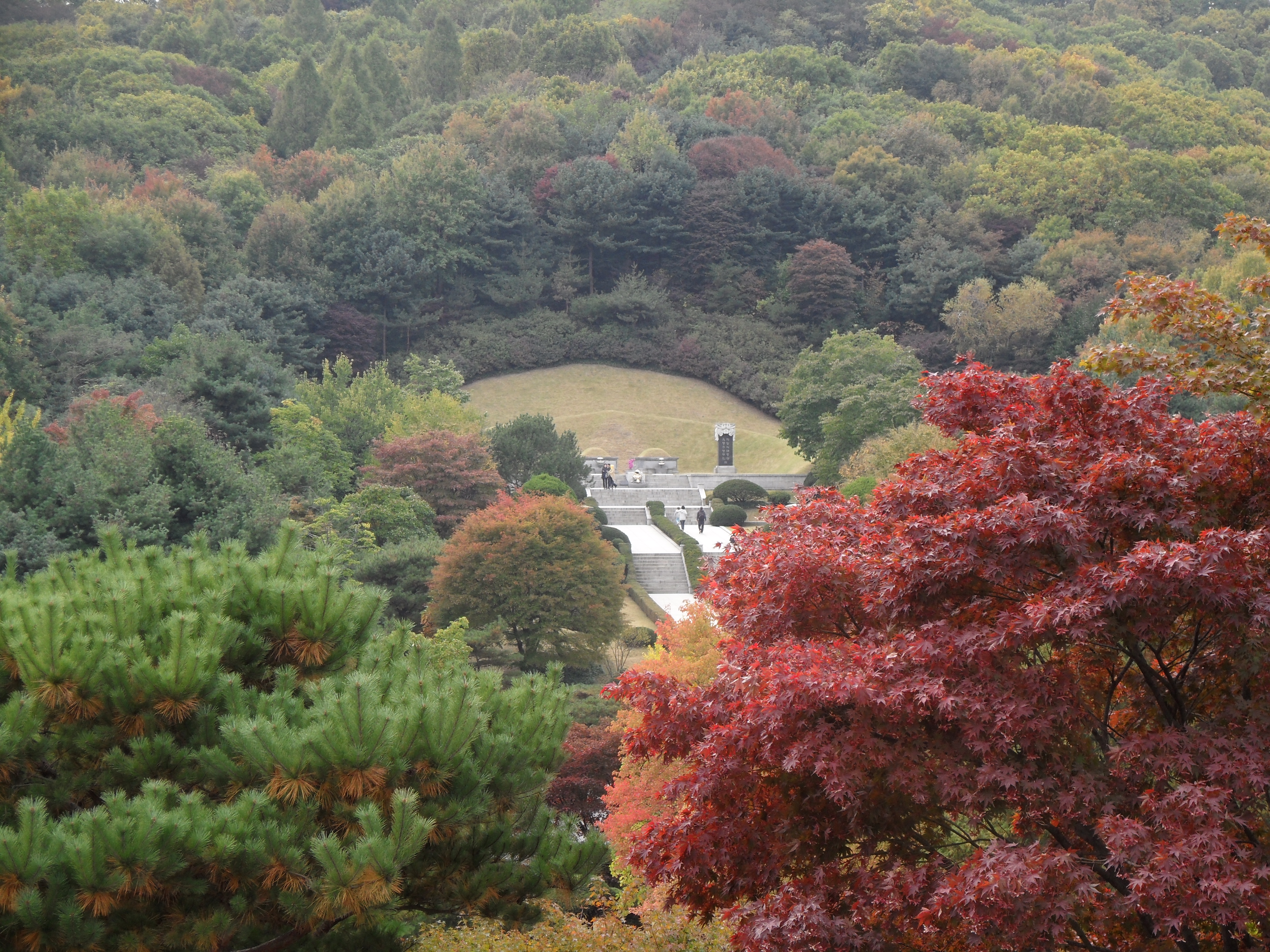
Tomb of Park Chung-hee and his wife Yuk Young-soo at Seoul National Cemetery

The assassination occurred at the Seoul National Theater of Korea during an Independence Day ceremony. Mun intended to shoot Park in the theater lobby. However, his view was obstructed, and he was forced to enter and be seated near the back of the theater. During Park's address, he attempted to get closer to the President but inadvertently fired his Smith & Wesson Model 36 revolver prematurely, injuring himself. Having alerted security, he then ran down the theater aisle firing wildly. His second bullet hit the left side of the podium from which Park was delivering his speech. The third bullet was a misfire. His fourth bullet struck Yuk Young-soo in the head, seriously wounding her. His last bullet went through a flag decorating the rear of the stage. A bullet fired by Park Jong-gyu, a member of the President's security detail, in response to Mun's attack, ricocheted off a wall and killed a high school student, Jang Bong-hwa. Immediately following the capture of Mun, Park resumed his scheduled speech despite his wife being wounded and carried from the stage. Following its completion he picked up his wife's handbag and shoes and left.

Yuk was rushed to the Seoul National University Hospital in Wonnam-dong, central Seoul. Dr. Shim Bo-seong, who was chief of the hospital's neurosurgery department, began operating on Yuk at 11 a.m., which lasted for over five hours. The bullet damaged the largest vein on the right side of her brain and remained lodged within the brain. The surgery was unable to save her life and she died at 7:00 p.m. that same day.

== Aftermath ==
Yuk was buried in a state funeral on 19 August 1974 at Seoul National Cemetery. After the assassination of Park Chung Hee, he was buried next to her. Park composed a poem the day after Yuk's state funeral.

Park Geun-hye then became the First Lady of South Korea after returning urgently from her studies in France at the Joseph Fourier University. She held this position for five years, until her father's assassination in 1979. On her 42nd death anniversary, a concert was organized in her memory in Seoul.

== Honours ==
- South Korea:
  - Honorary Recipient of the Grand Order of Mugunghwa (1967)
- Malaysia:
  - Honorary Recipient of the Most Exalted Order of the Crown of the Realm (1965)

== Personal life ==
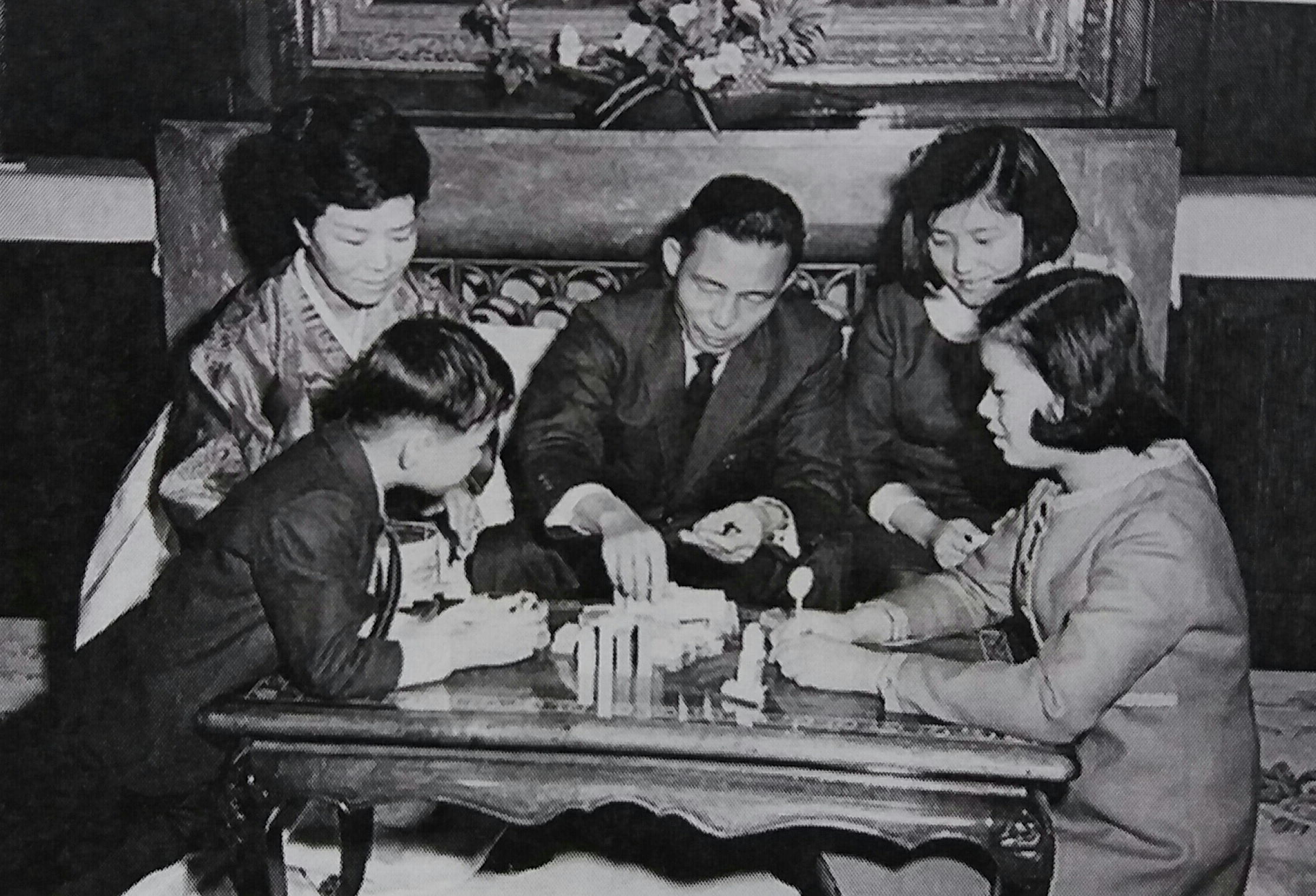
Yuk Young-soo, Park Chung-hee, and their children, including Park Geun-hye (1961)

Yuk Young-soo and Park Chung-hee had three children: daughters Park Geun-hye, the 11th president of South Korea, and Park Geun-ryoung, and a son, Park Ji-man.

Yuk Young-soo was a devout Buddhist and a devotee of Doseonsa in Seoul.

== See also ==
- Assassination of Park Chung Hee

== Bibliography ==
- Jager, Sheila Miyoshi (2013). Brothers at War: The Unending Conflict in Korea (Hardback). London: Profile Books. ISBN 978-1-84668-067-0.
- Keon, Michael (1977). Korean Phoenix: A Nation from the Ashes (Hardback). Prentice-Hall International. ISBN 978-013-516823-3.

Honorary titles
Preceded by Gong Deok-gwi	First Lady of South Korea; 17 December 1963-15 August 1974	Succeeded by Park Geun-hye (acting)
