= Spring in My Hometown =

- Poster for Spring in My Hometown (1998)
- Hangul: 아름다운 시절
- RR: Areumdaun sijeol
- MR: Arŭmdaun sijŏl
- Directed by: Lee Kwang-mo
- Written by: Lee Kwang-mo
- Produced by: Jung Taesung; Kang Sung-kyu
- Starring: Ahn Sung-ki; Bae Yoo-jung
- Cinematography: Kim Hyung-koo
- Edited by: Hahm Sung-won
- Music by: Won Il
- Distributed by: Korean Film Art Center BaekDu-DaeGan Company Ltd.
- Release date: 21 November 1998
- Running time: 120 minutes
- Country: South Korea
- Language: Korean

Spring in My Hometown (Korean: 아름다운 시절) is a 1998 South Korean drama film written and directed by Lee Kwang-mo.

== Synopsis ==
A story about two village boys, Sungmin and Changhee, in the summer of 1952, during the Korean War.

== Cast ==
- Ahn Sung-ki ... Sungmin's father
- Bae Yoo-jung ... Changhee's mother
- Cho Jae-hyun
- Kim Jungwoo ... Changhee
- Lee In ... Sungmin
- Myeong Gye-nam
- Myeong Sun-mi
- Oh Ji-hye ... Teacher
- Song Ok-sook ... Sungmin's mother
- Yu Hye-jeong
- Yu Oh-seong ... Sungmin's uncle

== Reception ==
Spring in My Hometown received positive reviews from critics. Time Out wrote that Lee Kwang-mo "directs both kids and adults with real insight" and praised the film for capturing childhood memories with precision.

The film also received recognition at international film festivals. The film had screened at major festivals including Cannes, Tokyo, Thessaloniki and Karlovy Vary. It won Tokyo Gold – The Governor of Tokyo Award at the 11th Tokyo International Film Festival in 1998.

== Awards ==
=== Wins ===
- Entrevues Film Festival (1998)
  - Grand Prix Foreign Film (Spring in My Hometown)
- Hawaii International Film Festival (1998)
  - Best Feature Film (Spring in My Hometown)
- Pusan International Film Festival (1998)
  - FIPRESCI Prize - Special Mention (Lee Kwang-mo) "For the director's mature approach to the consequences of recent Korean history on common people's lives."
- Thessaloniki Film Festival (1998)
  - Special Artistic Achievement (Lee Kwang-mo)
- Tokyo International Film Festival (1998)
  - Gold Award (Lee Kwang-mo)
- Fribourg International Film Festival (1999)
  - Don Quixote Award (Lee Kwang-mo)
- 36th Grand Bell Awards (1999)
  - Best Film
  - Best Director (Lee Kwang-mo)
  - Best Cinematography (Kim Hyung-koo)
  - Best Music (Won Il)
  - Best Art Direction (MBC Art Center)
  - Best Costume Design (MBC Art Center)
- Kerala International Film Festival (1999)
  - Special Jury Prize (Lee Kwang-mo)

=== Nominations ===
- Stockholm Film Festival (1998)
  - Bronze Horse (Lee Kwang-mo)
- Thessaloniki Film Festival (1998)
  - Golden Alexander (Lee Kwang-mo)
- 36th Grand Bell Awards (1999)
  - Best Supporting Actress (Song Ok-sook)
  - Best Screenplay (Lee Kwang-mo)
  - Best Planning (Baekdu-Daegan Co., Ltd.)
  - Best New Director (Lee Kwang-mo)
  - Best New Actor (Lee In)

== Bibliography ==
- Areumdawoon sheejul (1998) at IMDb
- Kim, Kyung-hyun (2004). "3. 'Is This How the War is Remembered?': Violent Sex and the Korean War in Silver Stallion, Spring in My Hometown, and The Taebaek Mountains". The Remasculinization of Korean Cinema. Durham and London: Duke University Press. pp. 87–93. ISBN 0-8223-3267-1.
- Paquet, Darcy. "Spring in My Hometown". koreanfilm.org.
- "Spring in my Hometown(Aleummda-un sijeol)(1998)". KMDb Korean Movie Database.
- "아름다운 시절 Spring in My Hometown, 1998". Cine21.
- "Hope, Despair, and Memory of the Koreans' War: Spring in My Hometown," Minjung Kim and Trenia Walker, Education About Asia 7.1 Spring 2002 (Free access after registration)

| Preceded by The Contact | Grand Bell Awards for Best Film; 1999 | Succeeded by Peppermint Candy |
| Preceded by A Single Spark | Chunsa Film Art Awards for Best Film; 1999 | Succeeded by Joint Security Area |
