= Lee Kwang-mo =

South Korean executive producer and film director

- Born: 28 January 1961 (age 65); South Korea
- Education: Korea University; University of California, Los Angeles
- Occupations: Executive producer, film director

Korean name
- Hangul: 이광모
- RR: I Gwangmo
- MR: I Kwangmo

Lee Kwang-mo (born 28 January 1961) is a South Korean executive producer and film director. He is best known for his first feature Spring in My Hometown (1998) which won numerous awards.

== Early life ==
On January 28, 1961, Lee was born in South Korea.

== Career ==
Lee majored in English at the Korea University and graduated from the University of California, Los Angeles in film and television studies in 1988. He has written many shorts and feature screenplays, and lectures at universities and film schools.

He wrote and directed his first feature Spring in My Hometown (1998) which took 13 years to make. He wrote the screenplay in memory of his father who died while he was studying in the U.S. The script won the first prize in the 1995 Hartley-Merrill International Screenwriting Competition. The film won numerous awards, including the Best Film Award at 36th Grand Bell Awards, and was the most critically acclaimed film of the year. It also topped most of the film critics' lists of the year's best features.

== Filmography ==
- Spring in My Hometown (1998)

== Awards ==
- 1998 Tokyo International Film Festival: Gold Prize for New directors (Spring in My Hometown)
- 1998 Thessaloniki Film Festival: Special Artistic Achievement (Spring in My Hometown)
- 1998 Pusan International Film Festival: FIPRESCI Prize - Special Mention (Spring in My Hometown)
- 1999 Korean Association of Film Critics Awards: Best Director (Spring in My Hometown)
- 1999 Kerala International Film Festival: Special Jury Prize (Spring in My Hometown)
- 1999 Fribourg International Film Festival: Don Quixote Award (Spring in My Hometown)
- 1999 35th Baeksang Arts Awards: Best New Director (Spring in My Hometown)
- 1999 7th Chunsa Film Art Awards: Best Planning/Producer (Spring in My Hometown)
- 1999 36th Grand Bell Awards: Best Director (Spring in My Hometown)
- 1999 36th Grand Bell Awards: Nominated – Best Original Screenplay (Spring in My Hometown)
- 1999 36th Grand Bell Awards: Nominated – Best New Director (Spring in My Hometown)
