= One Fine Spring Day =

2001 film by Hur Jin-ho

- Theatrical release poster
- Hangul: 봄날은 간다
- RR: Bomnareun ganda
- MR: Pomnarŭn kanda
- Directed by: Hur Jin-ho
- Written by: Ryu Jang-ha; Lee Suk-yeon; Shin Joon-ho; Hur Jin-ho
- Produced by: Cha Seung-jae; Kim Sun-ah
- Starring: Yoo Ji-tae; Lee Young-ae
- Cinematography: Kim Hyung-koo
- Edited by: Kim Hyeon
- Music by: Jo Seong-woo
- Distributed by: Cinema Service (South Korea); Shochiku (Japan)
- Release date: September 29, 2001
- Running time: 114 minutes
- Countries: South Korea; Japan; Hong Kong
- Language: Korean
- Box office: $69,474

One Fine Spring Day (Korean: 봄날은 간다) is a 2001 romantic drama film directed by Hur Jin-ho (of Christmas in August). Starring Yoo Ji-tae and Lee Young-ae, the film is a portrait of a love affair—from its blossoming in spring to its decline as the years pass. The film was theatrically released in South Korea on September 29, 2001.

== Plot ==
Sound engineer Sang-woo meets female radio DJ Eun-soo as they work together on a project capturing sounds from nature. They succeed in capturing various sounds and are attracted to one another. They start a relationship, but Sang-woo's intensifying passion reminds Eun-soo of her tragic past. She knows only too well how passion can vanish like a sound, and how love always ends.

== Cast ==
- Yoo Ji-tae as Sang-woo
- Lee Young-ae as Eun-soo
- Baek Seong-hee
- Park In-hwan
- Shin Shin-ae as aunt
- Baek Jong-hak
- Son Young-soon
- Lee Moon-sik as recording studio senior
- Park Seon-woo
- Gang Hwa-sun

== Popular culture ==
The character Eun-soo, portrayed by Lee Young-ae was the first to say the phrase "Do you want to eat ramyeon?", which later grew to exemplify a pick-up line meaning, "Do you want to sleep with me?". It was followed by a scene with broken hearted Sang-woo (Yoo Ji-tae), being offered soju with his ramyeon by his father.

== Accolades ==
Award ceremony	Year	Category	Nominee	Result	Ref.
Baeksang Arts Awards	2002	Best Director	Hur Jin-ho	Won	
Baeksang Arts Awards	2002	Best Screenplay	Hur Jin-ho	Nominated	
Baeksang Arts Awards	2002	Best Actress	Lee Young-ae	Nominated	
Blue Dragon Film Awards	2001	Best Film	One Fine Spring Day	Won	
Blue Dragon Film Awards	2001	Best Actor	Yoo Ji-tae	Nominated	
Blue Dragon Film Awards	2001	Best Actress	Lee Young-ae	Nominated	
Busan Film Critics Awards	2001	Best Film	One Fine Spring Day	Won	
Busan Film Critics Awards	2001	Best Director	Hur Jin-ho	Won	
Busan Film Critics Awards	2001	Best Actress	Lee Young-ae	Won	
Grand Bell Awards	2002	Best Film	One Fine Spring Day	Nominated	
Grand Bell Awards	2002	Best Actress	Lee Young-ae	Nominated	
Korean Association of Film Critics Awards	2001	Best Film	One Fine Spring Day	Won	
Korean Association of Film Critics Awards	2001	Best Cinematography	Kim Hyung-koo	Won	
Tokyo International Film Festival	2001	Best Art Direction	Park Il-hyun	Won	
