= Christmas in August =

- Theatrical release poster
- Hangul: 8월의 크리스마스
- Hanja: 8月의 크리스마스
- RR: 8worui keuriseumaseu
- MR: 8wŏrŭi k'ŭrisŭmasŭ
- Directed by: Hur Jin-ho
- Written by: Oh Seung-uk; Shin Dong-hwan; Hur Jin-ho
- Produced by: Cha Seung-jae
- Starring: Han Suk-kyu; Shim Eun-ha
- Cinematography: Yoo Young-gil
- Edited by: Hahm Sung-won
- Music by: Jo Seong-woo
- Release date: January 24, 1998 (South Korea)
- Running time: 97 minutes
- Country: South Korea
- Language: Korean

Christmas in August (Korean: 8월의 크리스마스) is a 1998 South Korean romantic drama film directed by Hur Jin-ho in his directorial debut. It stars Han Suk-kyu and Shim Eun-ha.

== Plot ==
After a failed engagement, photo shop owner Jung-won (Han Suk-kyu) is in his 30s and lives with his relatives: his sister, her husband and child, and his father. He meets Da-rim (Shim Eun-ha), a young parking agent, when she needs pictures as evidence to use against parking offenders printed quickly. Something clicks between them, they meet there more often and develop feelings for each other.

Before their romance goes any further, Jung-won finds out that his recent health problems are symptoms of a terminal disease. Part of his coming to terms with his fate, just when he has found happiness again, is breaking off all contact with Da-rim by closing the photo shop. She is brokenhearted but has no way to find him.

Jung-won also creates a step-by-step manual for the developing machine in his shop so his father can take over when Jung-won dies. He goes on a booze spree with his childhood friends as a farewell, but only tells his best friend about his impending death who doesn't believe him until Jung-won breaks down at the police station where they are taken.

After a period of time, Jung-won secretly observes how Da-rim is happily doing her job again and satisfied that his plan has worked. He takes a self-portrait with a timer and that photo is used as his funeral portrait.

== Cast ==
- Han Suk-kyu as Jung-won
- Shim Eun-ha as Da-rim
- Shin Goo as Jung-won's father
- Oh Ji-hye as Jung-sook (Jung-won's sister)
- Lee Han-wi as Chul-goo (one of Jung-won's friends)

== Awards ==
Award	Category	Recipient(s)	Result	Ref(s)
1999 36th Grand Bell Awards	Best Film	Christmas in August	Nominated	
1999 36th Grand Bell Awards	Best Director	Hur Jin-ho	Nominated	
1999 36th Grand Bell Awards	Best Actor	Han Suk-kyu	Nominated	
1999 36th Grand Bell Awards	Popularity Award, Actor	Han Suk-kyu	Won	
1999 36th Grand Bell Awards	Best Supporting Actor	Shin Goo	Nominated	
1999 36th Grand Bell Awards	Best Screenplay	Oh Seung-uk	Won	
1999 36th Grand Bell Awards	Best Cinematography	Yoo Young-gil	Nominated	
1999 36th Grand Bell Awards	Best Lighting	Kim Dong-ho	Nominated	
1999 36th Grand Bell Awards	Best Music	Cho Sung-woo	Nominated	
1999 36th Grand Bell Awards	Best Planning	Cha Seung-jae	Nominated	
1999 36th Grand Bell Awards	Best New Director	Hur Jin-ho	Won	
1999 36th Grand Bell Awards	Jury Prize	Christmas in August	Won	
1998 34th Baeksang Arts Awards	Best Film	Christmas in August	Won	
1998 34th Baeksang Arts Awards	Best Actor	Han Suk-kyu	Nominated	
1998 34th Baeksang Arts Awards	Best Actress	Shim Eun-ha	Won	
1998 34th Baeksang Arts Awards	Best New Director	Hur Jin-ho	Won	
1998 19th Blue Dragon Film Awards	Best Film	Christmas in August	Won	
1998 19th Blue Dragon Film Awards	Best Director	Hur Jin-ho	Nominated	
1998 19th Blue Dragon Film Awards	Best Actor	Han Suk-kyu	Nominated	
1998 19th Blue Dragon Film Awards	Popularity Star Award	Han Suk-kyu	Won	
1998 19th Blue Dragon Film Awards	Best Actress	Shim Eun-ha	Won	
1998 19th Blue Dragon Film Awards	Popularity Star Award	Shim Eun-ha	Won	
1998 19th Blue Dragon Film Awards	Best Cinematography	Yoo Young-gil (posthumously)	Won	
1998 19th Blue Dragon Film Awards	Best New Director	Hur Jin-ho	Won	
1998 1st Director's Cut Awards	Best Director	Hur Jin-ho	Won	
1998 1st Director's Cut Awards	Best Actor	Han Suk-kyu	Won	
1998 1st Director's Cut Awards	Best Actress	Shim Eun-ha	Won	
1998 3rd Women Viewers Film Awards	Best Actor	Han Suk-kyu	Won	

== Reception ==
With 422,930 admissions in Seoul and screenings at the Singapore and Pusan, the film to date has enduring fanbase in Asia and is often used for teaching screenwriting and cinematography in China and South Korea. Also in 1998, this film was invited to screen in the International Critics' Week section at the Cannes Film Festival. It placed 4th in the box-office among Korean films in 1998. Because of its success, the film received a commercial release at the Hong Kong Art Center on August 3, 1999, and the Broadway Cinematheque from September 30 till November 24, 1999. It was one of the titles garnering critical and popular support for the emerging Korean film industry, as well as inspiring subsequent works made in its tribute.

The film has also had an enduring influence within the Korean film industry. Actor Jang Hyuk reportedly studied the film in preparation for his comeback role in MBC drama Thank You. Assistant Director Park Heung-sik was influenced by particular scenes of Jung-won washing rice and teaching his father the VCR remote control, for his film Bravo, My Life!. The muffled weeping scene also found its way into My Mother, the Mermaid. Characters in Barking Dogs Never Bite and Girls' Night Out are shown, respectively, watching scenes of the VCR remote and lovers' stroll. Han and Shim are named as ideal casting choices by the eponymous aspiring script writer in My Sassy Girl.

The film landed in the top spot of Movie Week's special feature of 10 Best Korean Romance/Melodrama from 1980 to 2007, touting the lead performances as gold standards of the genre. In the same feature, noted director Song Hae-sung of Failan, names the scene of a lonely Jung-won singing "In the Street" by Kim Kwang-seok (whose funeral portrait inspired Hur Jin-ho's debut film), as a particularly resonant example of melodrama transcending its genre to express humanity's essence.

== Motifs ==
In the film, there were several motifs that the director tried to convey to the audience. Photography had a significant part in this movie. The director purposely made the scenes of the film very still and slow. His purpose doing so was to create the sense of a photo, where everything is still. This was meant to allow the audience to observe every detail, just like a photo.

Windows were another motif, encompassing the same idea of photography. During the scenes, where Da-rim and Jung-won would have a silent conversation on opposite sides of a window, the window symbolized a picture frame, creating a living portrait. When Jung-won's childhood love came to visit his shop while he was washing the windows, her image is blurry behind the window. This was meant to symbolize that she no longer had a clear place in his life. That's why when the other scenes, where Jung-won sees Da-rim from behind the window, the audience observes that Jung-won always sees Da-rim vividly, symbolizing that she does have an important part in his life. During one of the last scenes, Jung-won is seen affectionately reaching out to Da-rim behind a window. Photos are meant to capture precious memories, and we can only remember, unable to change the photo's reality. This was the symbolism of windows.

The funeral portrait was another motif, which symbolized Jung-won's acceptance of his early death. In the earlier scenes of the movie, Jung-won took a funeral portrait for an elderly woman. She had come back a second time to take her funeral portrait because she wanted to look her best, meaning she acknowledges her death soon and wants to make the most out of it. Through the movie we see Jung-won and emphasis on han, internal suffering. Near the end of the movie, Jung-won returns to his shop and proceeds to take his funeral portrait. This shows that he had finally come to terms with his early death, and was able to die peacefully, with no regrets. This can be confirmed by his final quote.

The final quote, itself, became a motif. "I knew that someday love would become nothing but a memory, like the countless photographs left behind in my recollections. But you alone have remained a part of me. I leave these words to thank you for letting me depart with your love."-Jung-won. This explains the reason why Jung-won did not try to tell Da-rim that he was fatally ill and did not try to reach out or explain to her his sudden disappearance. Jung-won did not want to taint the love he and Da-rim shared. It can be speculated that he did not want it to be love out of pity. Like a photo, he wanted to preserve his memories of Da-rim while they were still innocent and happy, unlike his childhood love, which turned out to be an unfortunate ending. This allowed him to die peacefully, departing from the world with his innocent memories of her. In the scenes where his childhood lover came back, she requested him to take down her portrait. But at the end of the movie, it is seen that Da-rim's portrait remained in his shop window, symbolizing how Jung-won will never forget about her and take her out of his life.

== Character analysis ==
=== Jung-won ===
Jung-won is the main character in this film. He owns a photography shop, which is where most of the film takes place. In the beginning of the film Jung-won was very optimistic. He didn't show his emotions about his inevitable death because he didn't want to burden others with the fact that he was going to die. The first time he announced that he was going to die was when he was drunk with his friend, Chul-goo. After this scene he begins to display more emotion about his imminent death, for example when he was at the police station he started to yell and cry causing a commotion, which was uncharacteristic of him to do. From this point forward Jung-won's personality begins to change, he is no longer as happy and optimistic as he was in the beginning of the film. Jung-won is unable to contain his emotions making the audience see his vulnerable state.

=== Da-rim ===
Da-rim is a traffic officer in this film. In the beginning of the film Da-rim is first introduced to Jung-won at the photography shop. At first she didn't seem interested in Jung-won; however, as she routinely went to his shop they became closer and more attached. She found herself falling in love with Jung-won and she eventually started to transition her appearance by wearing make-up. When Jung-won was admitted into the hospital and no longer went to work, Da-rim went to his shop every day. At this point because Jung-won disappeared without notice Da-rim started to miss him a lot. She even wrote a letter to Jung-won that the audience could only assume was contained with her feelings for him. She eventually became angry and threw a rock at the photography shop through her frustration that Jung-won disappeared. Eventually Da-rim learned to move on and accepted the fact that Jung-won will not come back.

== Korean melodramas ==
Linda Williams analyzed the film Way Down East (1920) and wrote an essay "Melodrama Revised" noting five features found in current melodramas that have still remained relevant in Korean cinema:

- 1.) Melodrama begins and wants to end with a sense of innocence.
- 2.) Melodrama focuses on victim-heroes and their virtues
- 3.) Melodrama appears modern by using realism, but realism also gives passion and action
- 4.) Melodrama involves a balance of passion and action such as being "too late" or "in the nick of time"
- 5.) Melodrama presents characters with psychic roles and conflicts between good and evil

Christmas in August does not incorporate all of the features, and is missing the fourth and fifth one. However, leaving out the fifth feature had become common since the 1990s. This was because South Korea's authoritarian government, which advocated moral frameworks in film through censorship, had collapsed. Starting in the 1980s, filmmakers were able to make their work seem more modern by leaving out the conflict between good and evil.

== Remake ==
In the 2007 Japanese remake directed by Shunichi Nagasaki, the female character is a teacher.
