= Mun Se-gwang =

Attempted assassin of Park Chung Hee (1951–1974)

- Mun during his trial in 1974
- Born: Nanjō Seikō (南条世光); 26 December 1951; Osaka, Occupied Japan
- Died: 20 December 1974 (aged 22); Seoul Detention Center, Seoul, South Korea
- Convictions: Homicide for Purpose of Insurrection (Article 88, Penal Code); Violation of National Security Law
- Comments: See for more details on his sentencing

Details
- Victims: Yuk Young-soo; Jang Bong-hwa (indirectly)
- Date: 15 August 1974

Korean name
- Hangul: 문세광
- Hanja: 文世光
- RR: Mun Segwang
- MR: Mun Segwang

Mun Se-gwang (26 December 1951 – 20 December 1974), also romanized as Moon Se-kwang, was a Korean Japanese assassin who attempted to assassinate South Korean president Park Chung Hee on 15 August 1974. The assassination attempt resulted in the deaths of Park's wife, Yuk Young-soo, and a high school student, Jang Bong-hwa.

== Biography ==
Mun Se-gwang was born to an ethnic Korean family in Osaka, Japan on 26 December 1951. His family had come to Japan from southern Korea in the mid-1930s.

While in high school, he began studying the biographies of Mao Zedong and Kim Il Sung, and became a supporter of communist beliefs. He communicated with supporters of Juche within the Korean community for several years. Before being contacted by North Korea, Mun was not known to have confirmed ties with any organized communist groups, but he was a known to have a "casual relationship" with Kim Ho-ryong, a member of the Zainichi Korean association Chongryon, which is close with North Korea.

In February 1974, Mun received orders from the North Korean government to assassinate President Park, receiving training for this purpose in Tokyo. In May, he communicated directly with North Korean agents aboard a ship. In July, he applied for a Japanese passport for the name Yukio Yoshii. It's alleged that he was aided in this by Mikiko Yoshii, a former schoolmate of Mun, who was the wife to the real Yukio Yoshii; she was ultimately sentenced to three months for passport-related violations, which was later suspended.

== Attempted assassination of Park Chung-hee ==
Stealing a Smith & Wesson Model 36 .38-caliber revolver from an Osaka police box on 18 July 1974, he concealed it in his luggage and flew to South Korea on 8 August 1974, using a Japanese passport to enter the country. He then booked into the Chosun Hotel.

Gaining entry to the National Theater in Seoul, on the day of a ceremony celebrating Korea's independence from Japan which was being attended by Park and his wife, Mun intended to shoot Park in the theater lobby. However, his view was obstructed; and he was forced to enter and be seated near the back of the theater. During Park's address, he attempted to get closer to Park but inadvertently fired his revolver prematurely, injuring himself. Having alerted security, Mun then ran down the theater aisle firing wildly. His second bullet hit the left side of the podium from which Park was delivering his speech. His third bullet was a misfire but the fourth struck Park's wife, Yuk Young-soo, in the head, seriously wounding her. His last bullet went through a flag decorating the rear of the stage. A bullet fired by Park Jong-gyu, one of the President's security detail, in response to Mun's attack ricocheted off a wall and killed a high school student, Jang Bong-hwa. Immediately following the capture of Mun, Park resumed his scheduled speech, despite the wounding of his wife and her being carried from the stage. Following its completion, he picked up his wife's handbag and shoes and left. Despite extensive surgery, Yuk died at 7:00 p.m. that same day.

During his interrogation, Mun confessed to having been aided in his bid to assassinate Park by an official of a North Korea aligned residents association in Japan. This, and the fact that Mun used a Japanese passport to enter South Korea, strained diplomatic relationships between Japan, North Korea, and South Korea; South Korea concluded that Mun was acting on behalf of North Korea, but Japan refused to accept South Korea's position. Consequently, Park threatened to break off diplomatic relations and to nationalise Japanese assets in South Korea. It required mediation by United States embassy officials before Japan issued a letter of regret, easing tensions between the two countries.

== Execution ==
At the trial, Mun Se-gwang, speaking through a Japanese interpreter, also expressed regret that he had failed to kill Park, and that an innocent schoolgirl had died because of his actions. On 17 December 1974, he was found guilty of the attempted assassination resulting in the deaths of two people and sentenced to death. Four months after his failed attempt, Mun was executed by hanging at Seoul Detention Center.

== Aftermath ==
The Japanese government responded with a written letter from Kakuei Tanaka and an oral statement from Etsusaburo Shiina, to the effect of "the incident has been an unfortunate one for the peoples of Korea and Japan alike”.

== See also ==
- Assassination of Park Chung Hee
- Blue House raid
- Park Geun-hye
  - 2016 South Korean political scandal
- History of South Korea
- Koreans in Japan
- Korean-Japanese disputes

== Bibliography ==
- Keon, Michael (1977). Korean Phoenix: A Nation from the Ashes. Prentice-Hall International. ISBN 978-013-516823-3.
- Oberdorfer, Don (1997). The Two Koreas: A Contemporary History. Reading: Addison-Wesley. ISBN 978-0-20140-927-7.
