= Hur Jin-ho =

South Korean film director and screenwriter (born 1963)

- Jin-ho in 2026
- Born: August 8, 1963 (age 63); Jeonju, South Korea
- Education: Yonsei University - Philosophy; Korean Academy of Film Arts - Filmmaking
- Occupations: Film director; screenwriter
- Agent(s): C-JeS Entertainment (2020-present)

Korean name
- Hangul: 허진호
- Hanja: 許秦豪
- RR: Heo Jinho
- MR: Hŏ Chinho

Hur Jin-ho (Korean: 허진호; born August 8, 1963) is a South Korean film director and screenwriter.

== Career ==
Hur graduated from Yonsei University with a degree in philosophy and went on to study filmmaking at the Korean Academy of Film Arts. His first steps as a film director did not go unnoticed as his first short, For Go-chul, was selected for the Vancouver International Film Festival. He later co-wrote the script of A Single Spark and Kilimanjaro. Many of his feature films, Christmas in August (shown at the Critics' Week in Cannes in 1998), One Fine Spring Day (2001), April Snow (2005), Happiness (2007) and A Good Rain Knows (2009) are variations on Hur's favorite theme: love. Film critic Kim Ji-mi says in Korean Film Observatory magazine (No. 23), Hur "shows the outstanding talent of being able to grasp the sensitive moments of the beginning and ending of a love between a man and a woman" (p. 22).

== Filmography ==
=== Feature film ===
Year	Title	Credited as			Notes	Ref.
Year	Title	Director	Writer	Producer	Notes	Ref.
1993	To the Starry Island	Assistant	No	No		
1995	A Single Spark	Assistant	Yes	No		
1998	Christmas in August	Yes	Yes	No		
1999	City of the Rising Sun	No	No	No	Bit part	
2000	Kilimanjaro	No	Yes	No		
2001	One Fine Spring Day	Yes	Yes	No		
2005	April Snow	Yes	Yes	No		
2007	Happiness	Yes	Yes	No		
2009	A Good Rain Knows	Yes	Yes	Yes	Korean-Chinese co-production	
2012	Dangerous Liaisons	Yes	No	No	Chinese film	
2016	The Last Princess	Yes	Yes	No		
2019	Forbidden Dream	Yes	No	No		
2023	A Normal Family	Yes	No	No		
2026	The Assassin(s)	Yes	No	No		

=== Short film ===
Year	Title	Credited as			Notes	Ref.
Year	Title	Director	Writer	Producer	Notes	Ref.
1993	For Go-chul	Yes	No	No		
2003	Alone Together	Yes	No	No	from omnibus Twentidentity	
2004	My New Boyfriend	Yes	No	No		
2009	I'm Right Here	Yes	No	No	from omnibus Five Senses of Eros	
2019	The Present	Yes	No	No		

=== Television series ===
Year	Title	Credited as	
Year	Title	Director	Writer
2021	Lost	Yes	No
2024	Love in the Big City	Yes	No

== Theater ==
- 2010: A Nap - director

== Awards and nominations ==
Award	Year	Category	Nominated work	Result	Ref(s)
Baeksang Arts Awards	1998	Best New Director	Christmas in August	Won	
Baeksang Arts Awards	2002	Best Director	One Fine Spring Day	Won	
Baeksang Arts Awards	2002	Best Screenplay (Note: Hur Jin-ho with Lee Suk-yeon, Seo Yoo-min and Shin Joon-ho)	One Fine Spring Day	Nominated	
Blue Dragon Film Awards	1998	Best New Director	Christmas in August	Won	
Blue Dragon Film Awards	2007	Best Director	Happiness	Nominated	
Blue Dragon Film Awards	2007	Best Screenplay	Happiness	Nominated	
Blue Dragon Film Awards	2026	Best Film	The Assassin(s)	Pending	
Blue Dragon Film Awards	2026	Best Director	The Assassin(s)	Pending	
Buil Film Awards	2008	Best Director	Happiness	Nominated	
Busan Film Critics Awards	2001	Best Director	One Fine Spring Day	Won	
Chunsa Film Art Awards	2020	Best Director	Forbidden Dream	Nominated	
Director's Cut Awards	1998	Best Director	Christmas in August	Won	
Director's Cut Awards	2025	Best Director (Film)	A Normal Family	Nominated	
Grand Bell Awards	1999	Best Screenplay (Note: Hur Jin-ho with Oh Seung-uk and Shin Dong-hwan)	Christmas in August	Won	
Grand Bell Awards	1999	Best New Director	Christmas in August	Won	
Grand Bell Awards	2008	Best Director	Happiness	Nominated	
Grand Bell Awards	2008	Best Screenplay	Happiness	Nominated	
Grand Bell Awards	2016	Best Director	The Last Princess	Nominated	
Korean Association of Film Critics Awards	2007	Best Screenplay	Happiness	Won	
Korean Film Awards	2007	Best Director	Happiness	Nominated	

== See also ==
- List of Korean film directors
- Cinema of Korea
