= Dongdaemun (disambiguation) =

Dongdaemun is one of the Eight Gates of Seoul.

Dongdaemun may also refer to:

- Dongdaemun Design Plaza, a building in Seoul
- Dongdaemun District, an autonomous district in Seoul
  - Dongdaemun A, a constituency of the National Assembly of South Korea
  - Dongdaemun B, a constituency of the National Assembly of South Korea
- Dongdaemun History & Culture Park, a park in Seoul
- Dongdaemun History & Culture Park station, a station in Seoul
- Dongdaemun Market, a shopping area in Seoul
- Dongdaemun Stadium, a demolished sports complex in Seoul
  - Dongdaemun Baseball Stadium, a baseball stadium part of the complex
- Dongdaemun Station, a station in Seoul
