= Central Asia Street =

Area in Seoul, South Korea

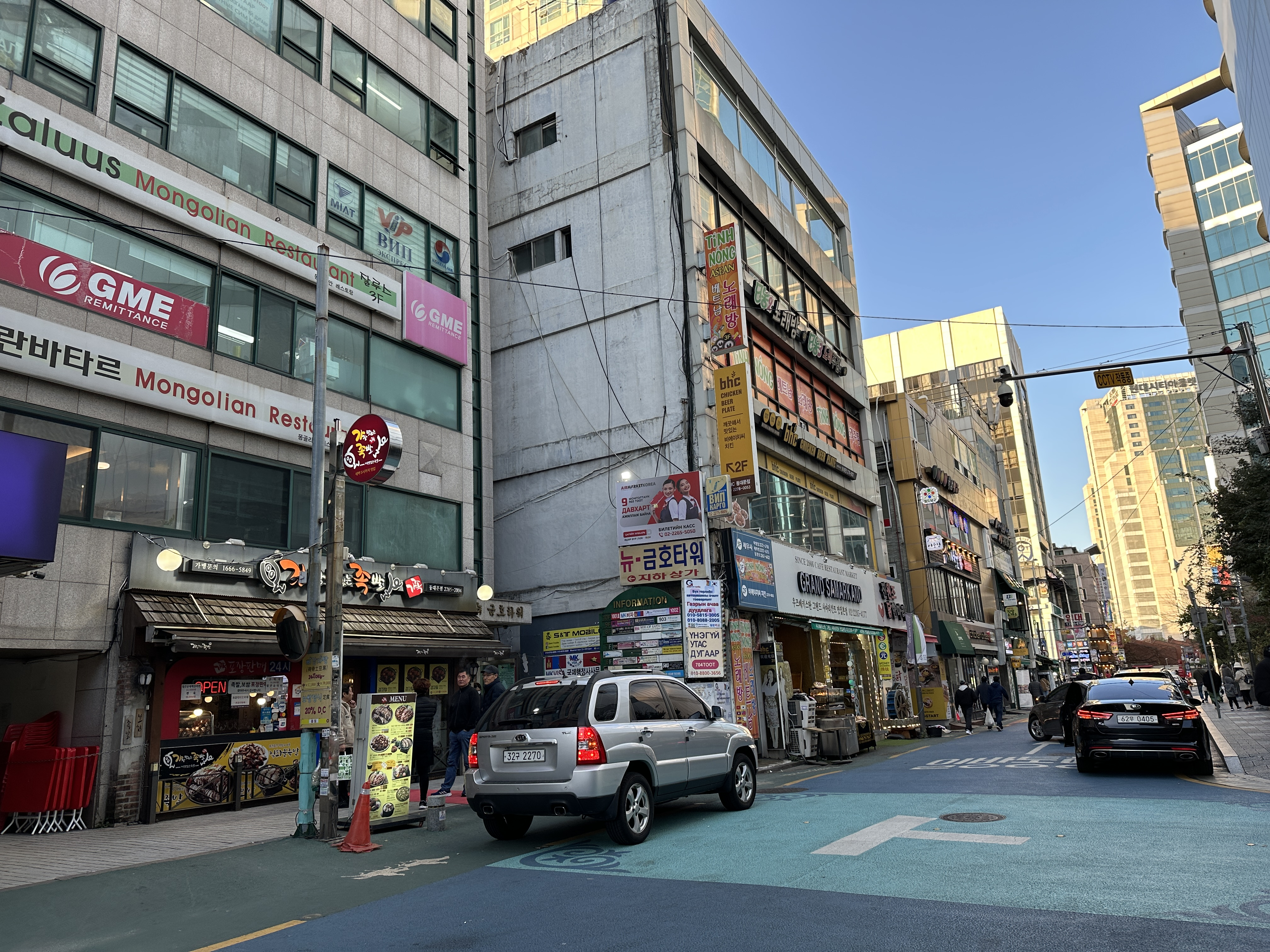
- Various businesses related to Central Asia on the street (2023)
- Interactive map of Central Asia Street
- Coordinates: 37.5656668°N 127.0057385°E
- Country: South Korea
- City: Seoul
- District: Jung District
- Neighborhood: Gwanghui-dong

Central Asia Street (Korean: 중앙아시아거리) is the nickname for an area in Gwanghui-dong, Jung District, Seoul, South Korea. It is so named because of the relatively high density of Central Asia-themed businesses in the area. In addition to its population of foreigners of non-Korean ethnicity, the area also has a notable population of Koryo-saram, ethnic Koreans from the former Soviet Union. The area reportedly formerly went by the name Little Moscow.

Cyrillic, a script used for many Central Asian and Slavic languages, can be widely seen in the area. The ground level of the street has a number of restaurants and bars that specialize in Central Asian and Russian food and drinks, including kebabs and vodka. Along the main entrance to the street is a 10-story building known as "Mongolian Town". In addition to stores and restaurants, many of the establishments cater to the needs of the locals, such as banks, hair salons, and job agencies.

The area is near the Dongdaemun History & Culture Park station and the park the station is named after.

== History ==
The area began as a place with relatively cheap rent, with many bars and night clubs in the area. After the collapse of the Soviet Union, Russians moved to South Korea in search of business opportunities, and worked as laborers and small business owners. Many then left Korea in the 2000s for China, following the economic boom around then.

The area developed its Central Asian characteristic beginning in around 2004 or 2005. According to one interviewee in 2009, the neighborhood was a favorite meeting spot for Central Asian and Russian factory workers in the area. According to another business owner in 2017, when she first opened their restaurant around 16 years ago, Korean customers did not like lamb. But by then, around 70% of her customers were Korean. The storeowner noted that, as a foreigner, she had to renew her visa annually and pay "hefty" taxes, and that securing visas for her workers could be difficult. Despite this, she and her employees enjoyed life in Korea.

However, in 2018, one interviewee from the area felt that more and more white-collar workers were replacing blue-collar workers in the area. The interviewee felt this way because workers from their home country, Mongolia, actually came from well-educated and relatively affluent families. This was in contrast to their former image as manual laborers. Many workers arrive using a D-9-1 international trade visa, which can be obtained from a Jung District community center that opened in 2015. If one completes the trade business academy in the center, one receives the visa for a year.

Around 2018, there were around 318 Mongolian, 491 Uzbekistani, 285 Russian, 87 Kazakhstani, and 25 Kyrgyzstani nationals living in Jung District.

== Gallery ==
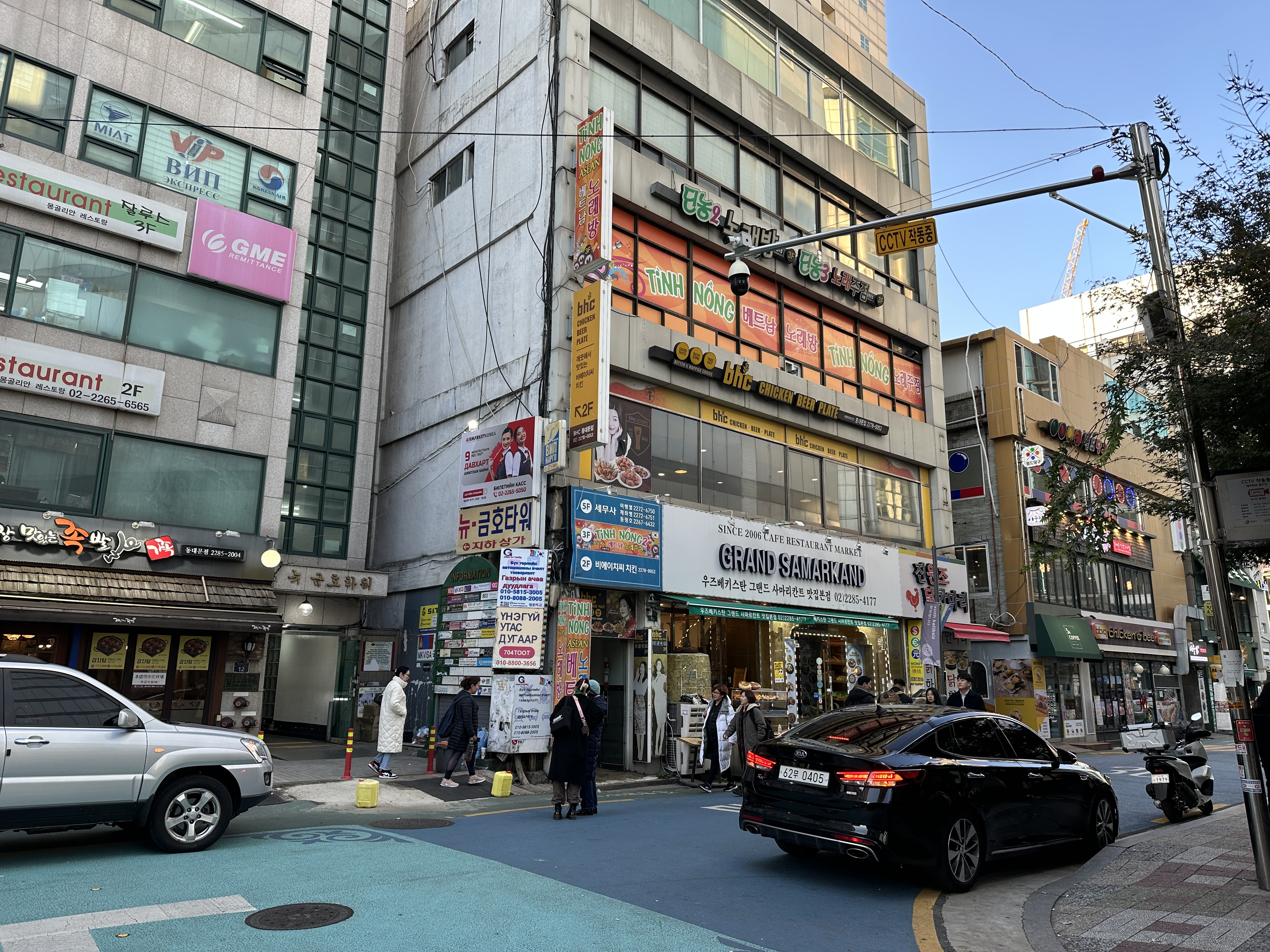
On the north side of the main street (2023)

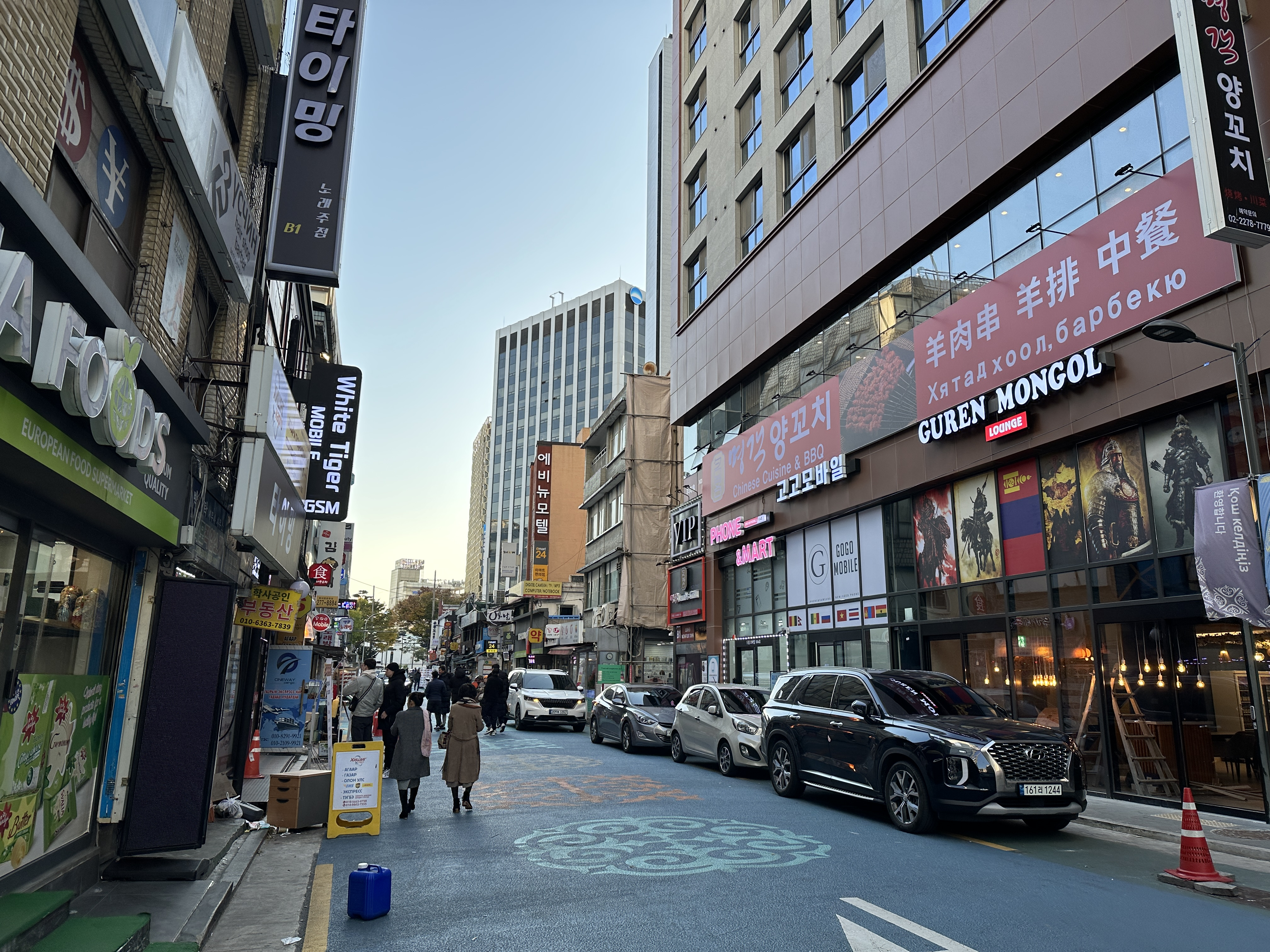
On the north side, looking south (2023)

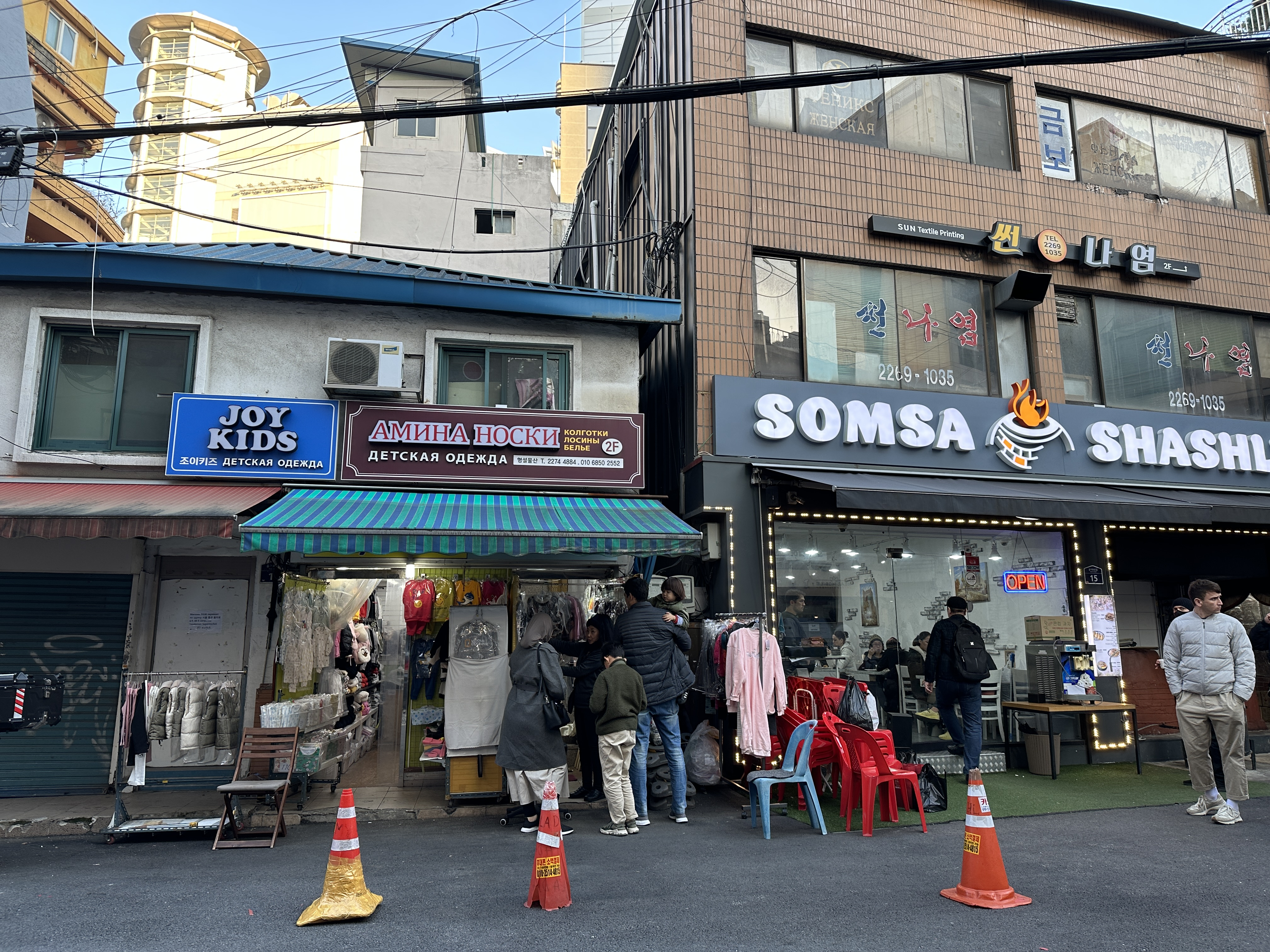
More businesses (2023)

== See also ==
- Itaewon: another ethnic enclave in Seoul
- Seorae Village: a French ethnic enclave
- Texas Street: a red-light district and enclave for Koryo-saram in Busan
- Minorities in Korea
- Immigration to South Korea
- Visa policy of South Korea
