= Ojang-dong =

Neighbourhood in Seoul, South Korea

Coordinates: 34°58′N 128°26′E

- Interactive map of Ojang-dong
- Country: South Korea

Korean name
- Hangul: 오장동
- Hanja: 五壯洞
- RR: Ojang-dong
- MR: Ojang-dong

Ojang-dong (Korean: 오장동) is a legal dong (neighbourhood) of Jung District, Seoul, South Korea. It is administered by its administrative dong, Gwanghui-dong.

== See also ==
- Administrative divisions of South Korea
