= Yegwan-dong =

Neighbourhood in Seoul, South Korea

- Country: South Korea

Korean name
- Hangul: 예관동
- Hanja: 藝館洞
- RR: Yegwan-dong
- MR: Yegwan-dong

Yegwan-dong (Korean: 예관동) is a legal dong (neighbourhood) of Jung District, Seoul, South Korea. It is administered by its administrative dong, Gwanghui-dong.

== See also ==
- Administrative divisions of South Korea
