= Heungin-dong =

Neighborhood in Seoul, South Korea

- Interactive map of Heungin-dong
- Country: South Korea

Area
  - Total: 0.12 km^{2} (0.046 sq mi)

Korean name
- Hangul: 흥인동
- Hanja: 興仁洞
- RR: Heungin-dong
- MR: Hŭngin-dong

Heungin-dong (Korean: 흥인동) is a legal dong (neighborhood) of Jung District, Seoul, South Korea and governed by its administrative dong, Sindang 1-dong.

== Chungmu Arts Hall ==
Chungmu Arts Hall is multi-purpose cultural complex located in Heungin-dong, near Sindang Station. Facilities includes a 1,231 seats Grand Theater, 327 seats Black Theater and 258 seats Blue Theater; Chungmu Gallery designed for installations and experimental artwork; sport hall with gymnasium, fitness room, dance studios and swimming pool; and the Chungmu Academy.

Events

- Lee Min Woo of Shinhwa held a series of concerts, titled M's Acoustic & Unplugged from 15 to 25 October 2009.
- Musical The Three Musketeers from 15 December 2010 to mid-January 2011, Kyuhyun of Super Junior rotated with TRAX's Jay "Typhoon" Kim as D'Artagnan, along with Yoo Jun Sang, Im Ki Jun, Kim Mu Yul and Dana Hong.
- Musical Jack the Ripper played at the Grand Theater from 5 July to 14 August 2011, with Ahn Jae-wook, Um Ki-joon, Lee Ji-hoon and Sungmin of Super Junior rotating in the lead role of Daniel.

== See also ==
- Administrative divisions of South Korea
