= Muhak-dong =

Neighbourhood in Seoul, South Korea

- Interactive map of Muhak-dong
- Country: South Korea

Area
  - Total: 0.03 km^{2} (0.012 sq mi)

Korean name
- Hangul: 무학동
- Hanja: 舞鶴洞
- RR: Muhak-dong
- MR: Muhak-tong

Muhak-dong (Korean: 무학동) is a legal dong (neighbourhood) of Jung District, Seoul, South Korea and governed by its administrative dong, Sindang 1-dong.

== See also ==
- Administrative divisions of South Korea
