= Sindang station =

Train station in South Korea

Coordinates: 37°33′56″N 127°01′10″E

신당; Sindang
신당; Sindang
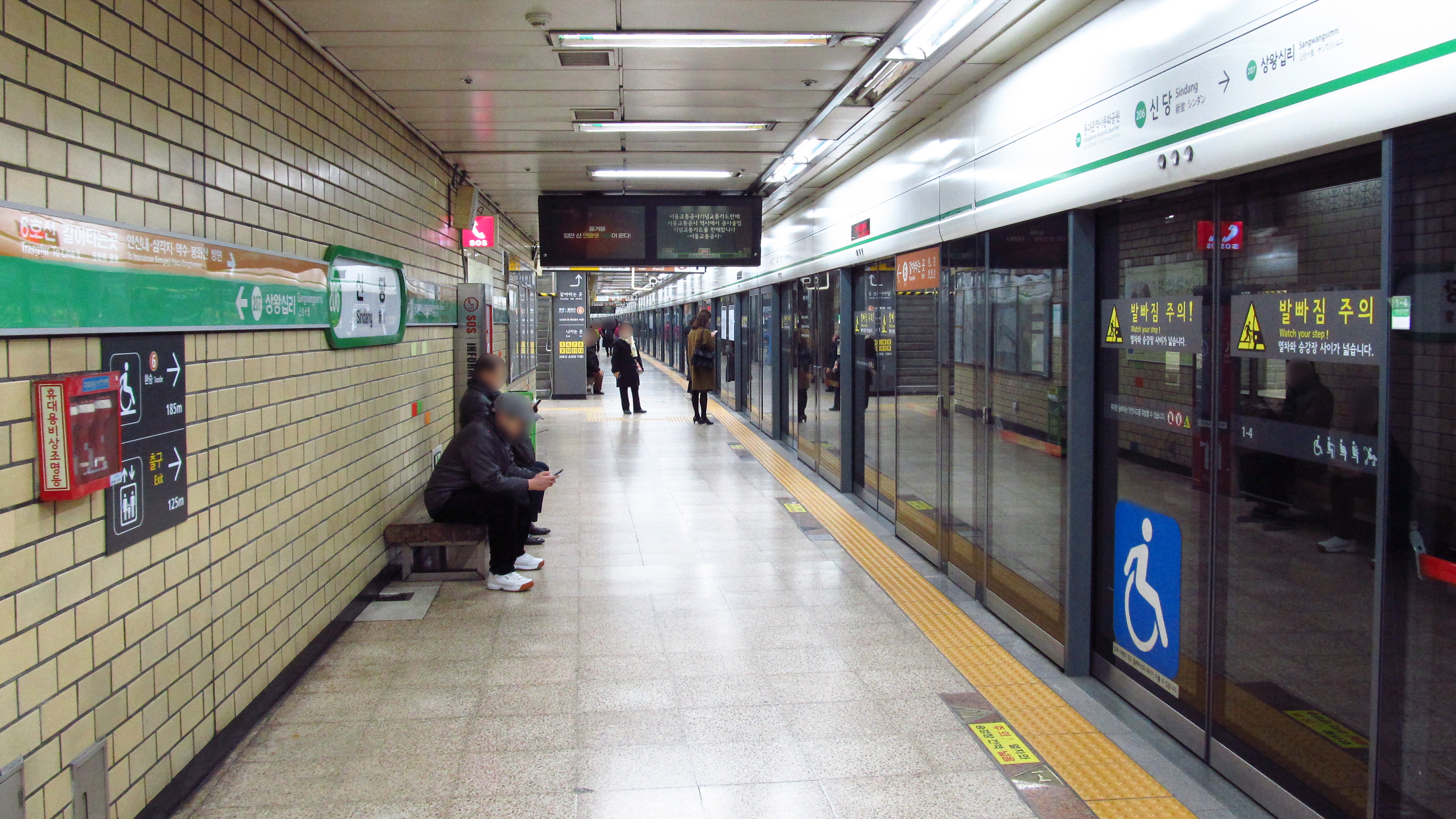
- Station Platform (Line 2)

Korean name
- Hangul: 신당역
- Hanja: 新堂驛
- Revised Romanization: Sindang-nyeok
- McCune–Reischauer: Sindang-nyŏk

General information
- Location: 431-1 Toegye-ro jiha, 106-1 Sindang 5-dong, Jung-gu, Seoul
- Operator: Seoul Metro
- Lines: Line 2 Line 6
- Platforms: 3
- Tracks: 4

Construction
- Structure type: Underground

Key dates
- September 16, 1983: Line 2 opened
- December 15, 2000: Line 6 opened

Services
Preceding station	Seoul Metropolitan Subway	Following station
Dongdaemun History & Culture Park Next counter-clockwise	Line 2	Sangwangsimni Next clockwise
Cheonggu towards Eungam	Line 6	Dongmyo towards Sinnae
Location

Sindang Station is a subway station on the Seoul Subway Line 2 and Line 6.

The Line 2 station is located in Sindang-dong, and the Line 6 station in Heungin-dong, both within Jung-gu of Seoul.

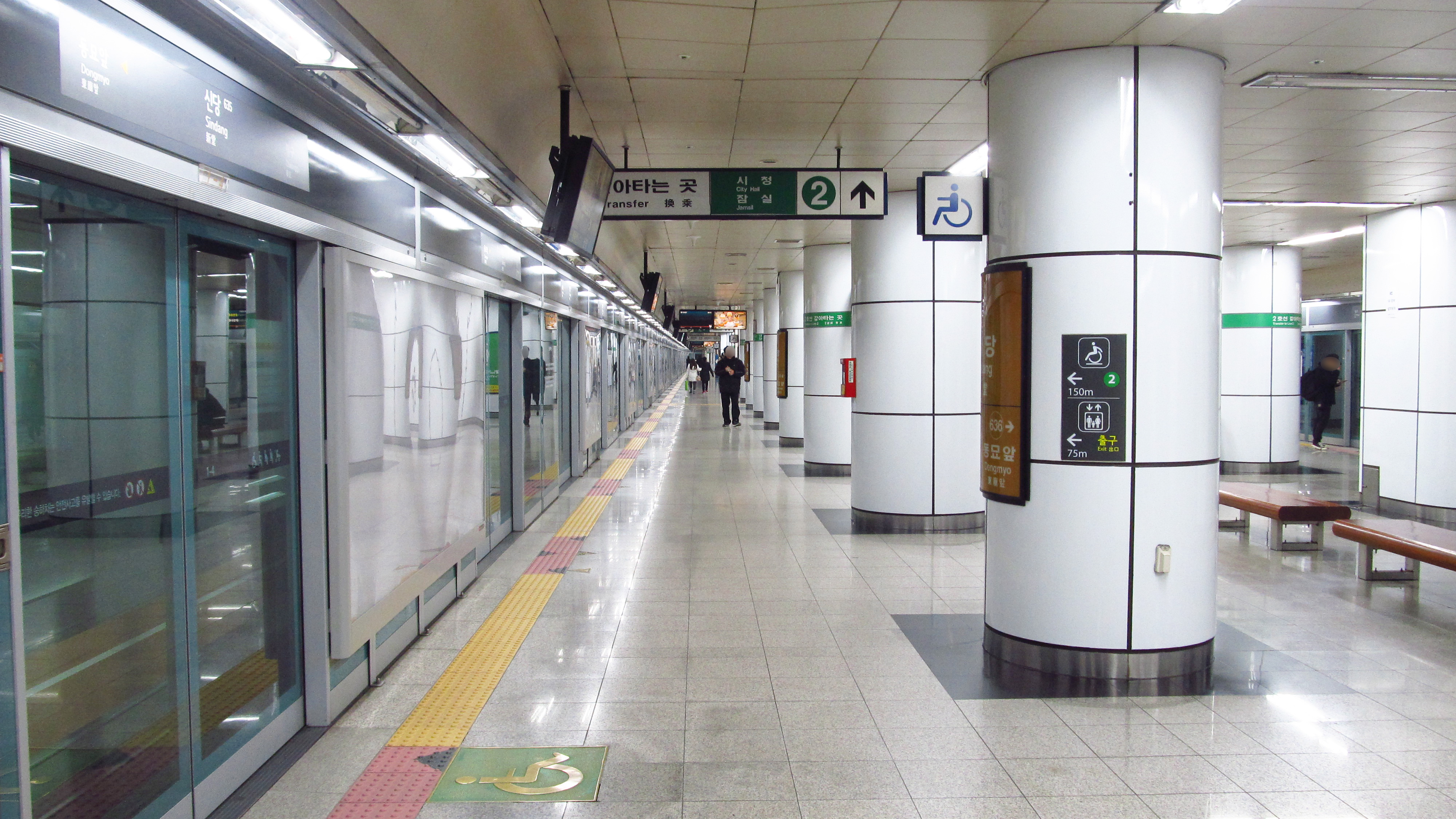
Line 6 platform

== Vicinity ==
- Exit 1 : Korea Workers' Compensation & Welfare Service
- Exit 3 : Seongdong High School
- Exit 6 : Heungin Elementary School
- Exit 8 : Tteokbokki Town
- Exit 9 : Chungmu Arts Hall
- Exit 10 : Kwanghee Elementary School

== Chungmu Arts Hall ==
Chungmu Arts Hall is an art center near Sindang station Entrance No.9 of Line 6. It is a multi-purpose cultural complex, with theatres and sports facilities, as well as art gallery and academy.

== Sindang neighbourhood ==
The Sindang-dong neighbourhood, is found by turning at the first left coming from exit 8 and for approximately two blocks. It is a popular shopping area with a variety of food markets, and eateries that specialise in Korean snacks such as Tteokbokki. It is known to Koreans for its Tteokbokki Town.
