= Singeumho station =

Metro station in Seoul, South Korea

신금호; Singeumho
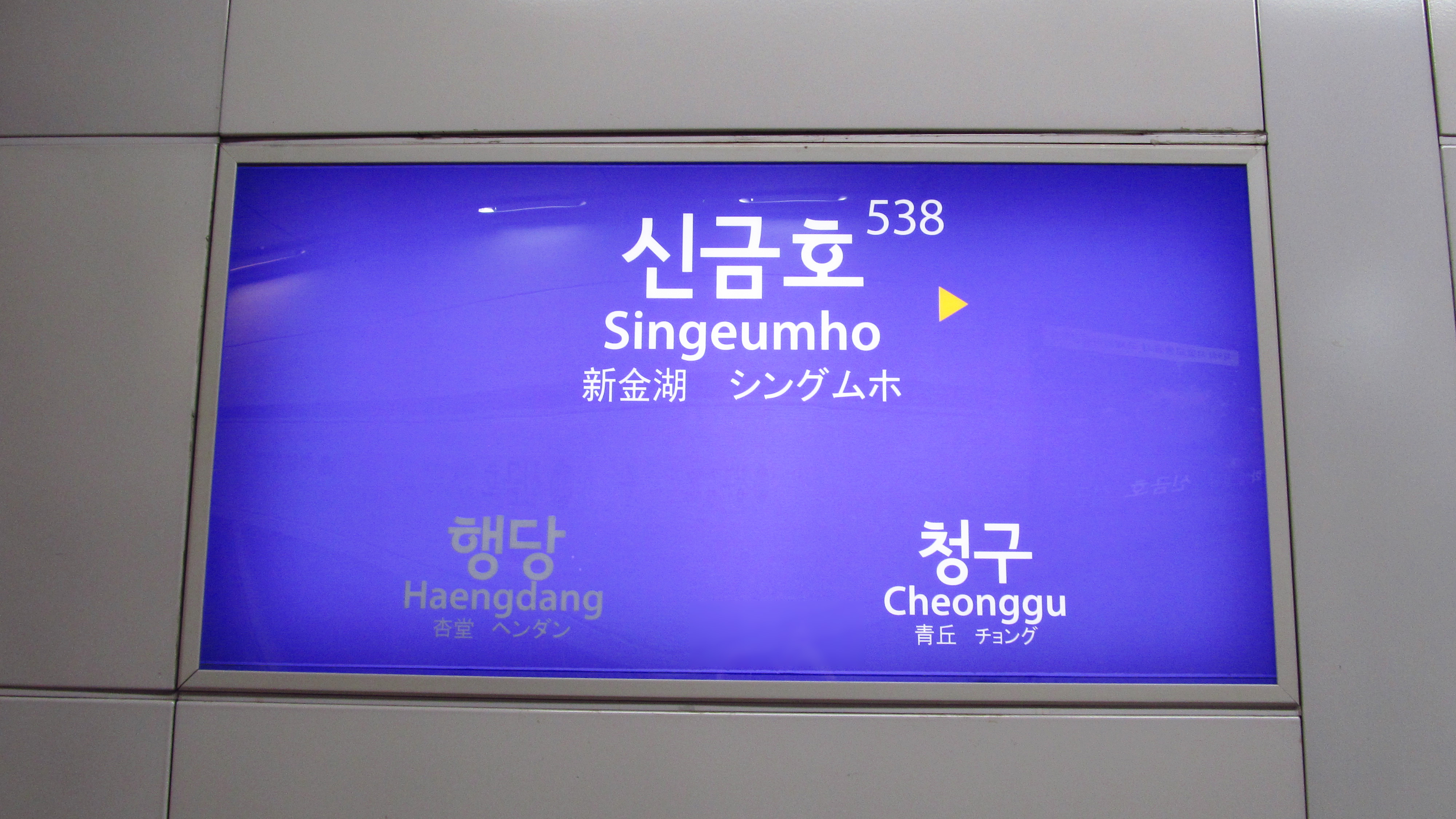

Korean name
- Hangul: 신금호역
- Hanja: 新金湖驛
- Revised Romanization: Sin-geumho-yeok
- McCune–Reischauer: Sin'gŭmho-yŏk

General information
- Location: 154 Geumhoro Jiha, 223-1 Geumho 2-ga-dong, Seongdong-gu, Seoul
- Coordinates: 37°33′16″N 127°01′16″E
- Operator: Seoul Metro
- Line: Line 5
- Platforms: 1
- Tracks: 2

Construction
- Structure type: Underground

History
- Opened: December 30, 1996

Services
Preceding station	Seoul Metropolitan Subway	Following station
Cheonggu towards Banghwa	Line 5	Haengdang towards Hanam Geomdansan or Macheon
Location

Singeumho Station is a station on Seoul Subway Line 5, Seoul, South Korea. Prior to its opening, it was originally planned to be called Musumak Station (무수막역). Because of the relatively high altitude of this neighborhood, the platform is located eight floors below ground level.

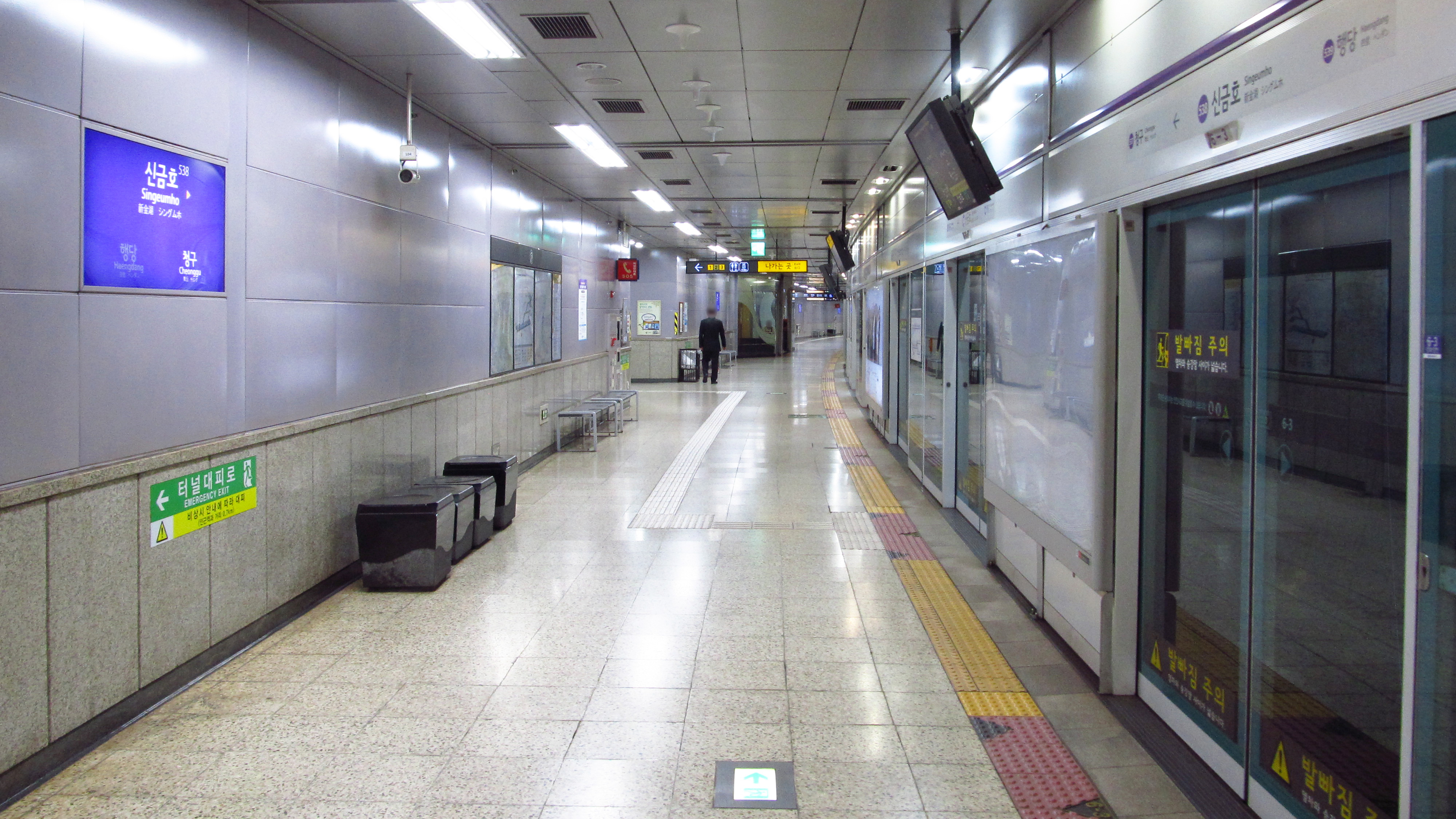

== Station layout ==
G	Street level	Exit

L1; Concourse	Lobby	Customer Service, Shops, Vending machines, ATMs

L2; Platforms	Island platform, doors will open on the left
L2; Platforms	Westbound	← Line 5 toward Banghwa (Cheonggu)
L2; Platforms	Eastbound	Line 5 toward Hanam Geomdansan or Macheon (Haengdang)→
L2; Platforms	Island platform, doors will open on the left
