= Cheonggu station =

Metro station in Seoul, South Korea

청구; Cheonggu
청구; Cheonggu
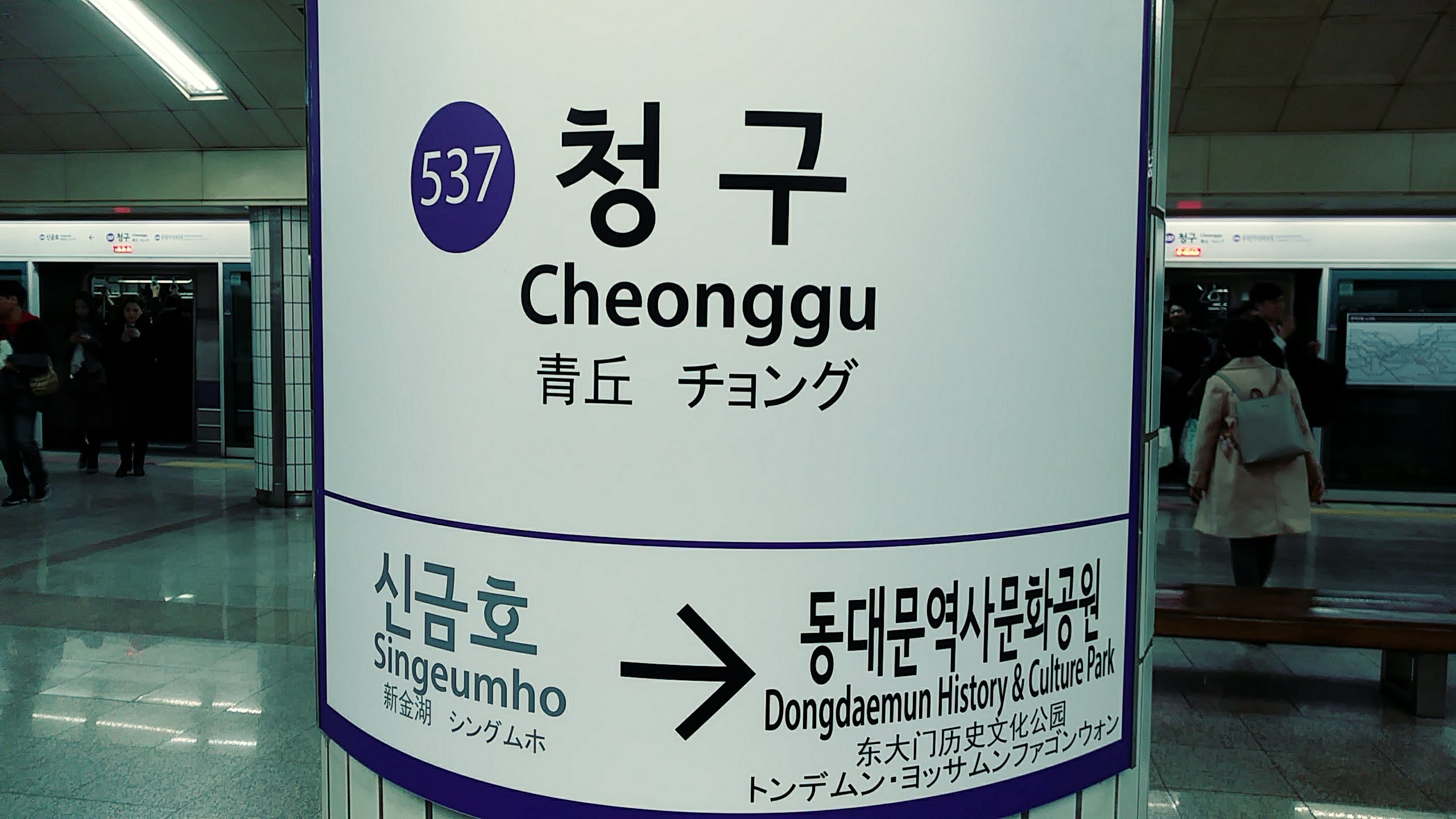
- Line 5 station name sign

Korean name
- Hangul: 청구역
- Hanja: 靑丘驛
- Revised Romanization: Cheonggu-yeok
- McCune–Reischauer: Ch'ŏnggu-yŏk

General information
- Location: 77 Cheongguro Jiha, 294 Sindang 2-dong, Jung-gu, Seoul
- Coordinates: 37°33′37″N 127°00′50″E
- Operator: Seoul Metro
- Lines: Line 5 Line 6
- Platforms: 3
- Tracks: 4

Construction
- Structure type: Underground

Key dates
- December 30, 1996: Line 5 opened
- December 15, 2000: Line 6 opened

Services
Preceding station	Seoul Metropolitan Subway	Following station
Dongdaemun History & Culture Park towards Banghwa	Line 5	Singeumho towards Hanam Geomdansan or Macheon
Yaksu towards Eungam	Line 6	Sindang towards Sinnae
Location

Cheonggu Station is a subway station located in Jung District, Seoul, South Korea. This station is served by Line 5 and Line 6 of the Seoul Subway.

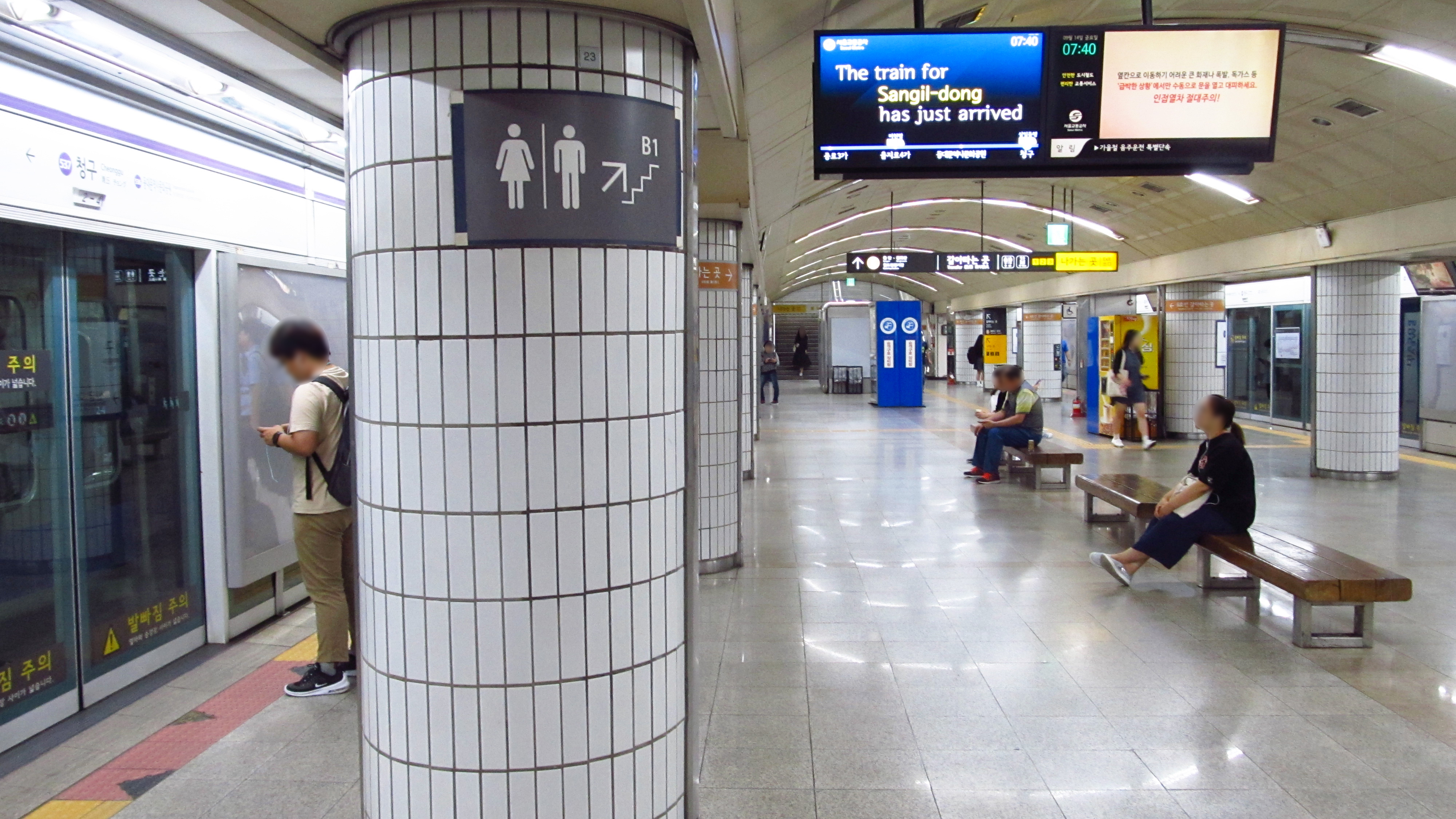
Line 5 platform

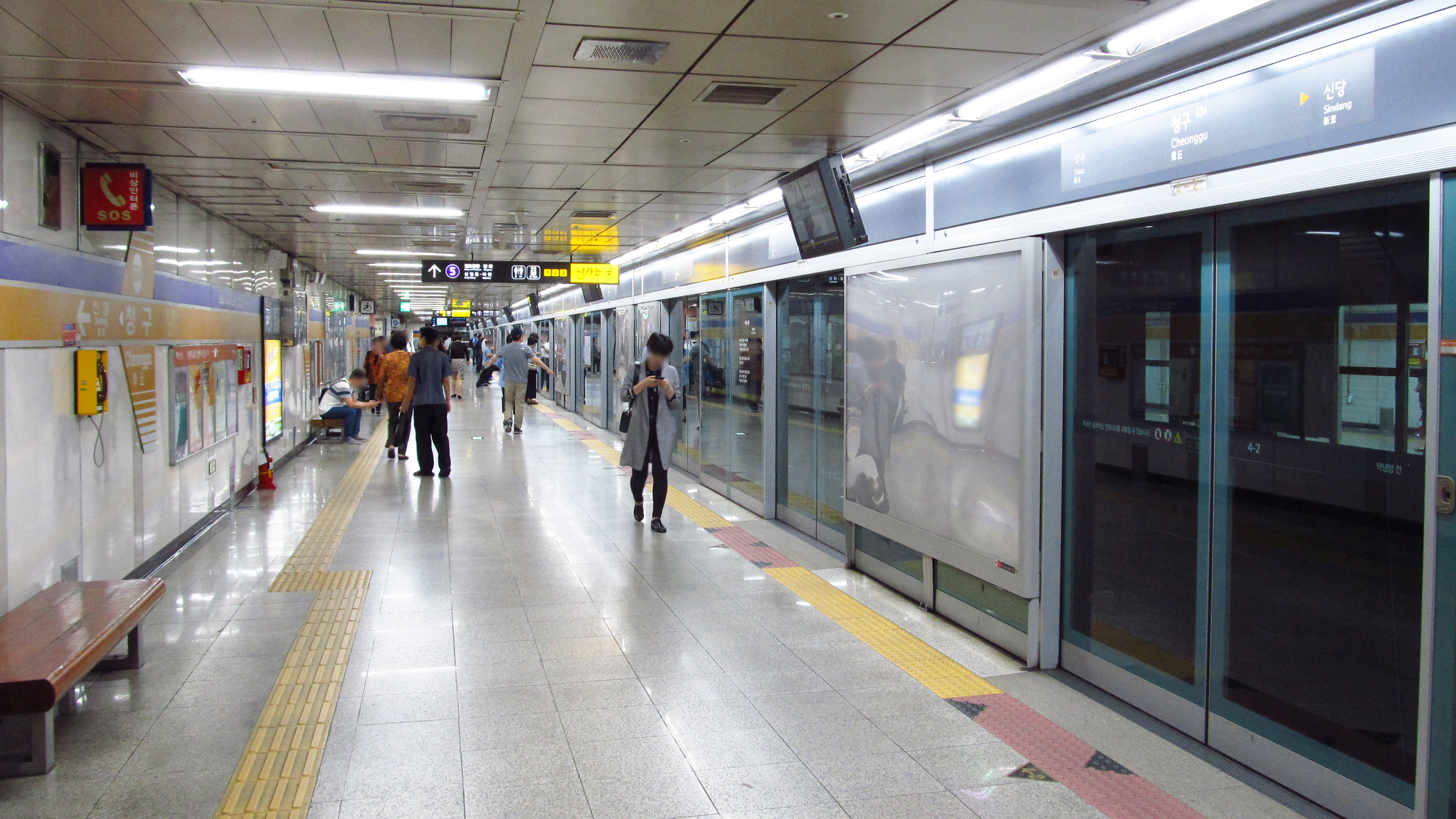
Line 6 platform

== Station layout ==
G	Street level	Exit

L1; Concourse	Lobby	Customer Service, Shops, Vending machines, ATMs

L2; Line 5 platforms	Westbound	← Line 5 toward Banghwa (Dongdaemun History & Culture Park)
L2; Line 5 platforms	Island platform, doors will open on the left
L2; Line 5 platforms	Eastbound	Line 5 toward Hanam Geomdansan or Macheon (Singeumho)→

L3; Line 6 platforms	Side platform, doors will open on the right
L3; Line 6 platforms	Westbound	← Line 6 toward Eungam (Yaksu)
L3; Line 6 platforms	Eastbound	Line 6 toward Sinnae (Sindang) →
L3; Line 6 platforms	Side platform, doors will open on the right

== Vicinity ==
- Exit 1: Jangchung Elementary School
- Exit 2: Heungin Elementary School
- Exit 3: Cheonggu Elementary School
