= Park Chung-hee's House in Sindang-dong, Seoul =

Former home of a South Korean president

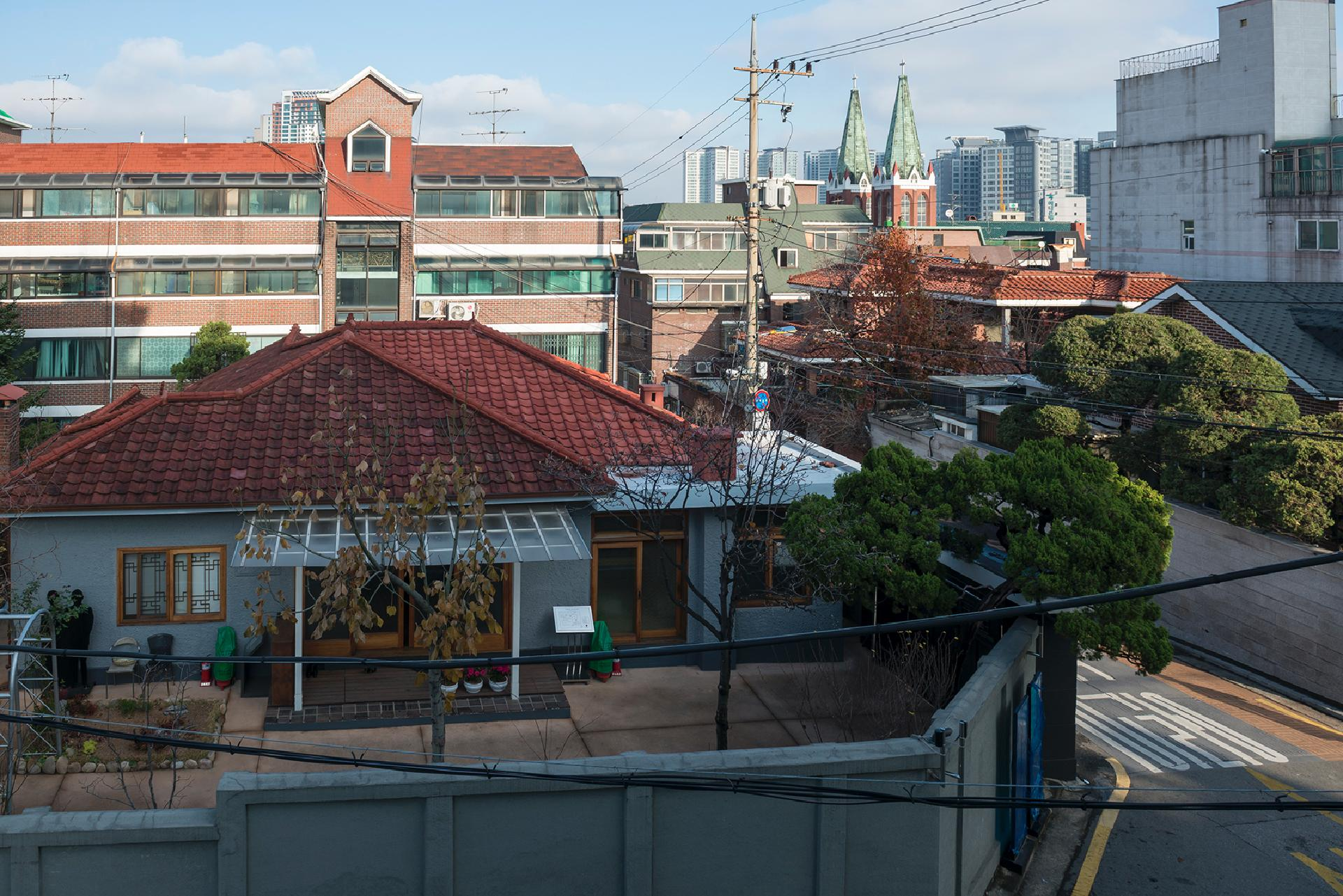
- The house, with red roof and walled-off courtyard (2014)

General information
- Location: 25 Dasan-ro 36ga-gil, Jung District, Seoul, South Korea
- Coordinates: 37.561389°N 127.019722°E

Technical details
- Floor count: 2 (1 underground, 1 above)
- Floor area: 128.93 m^{2} (1,387.8 sq ft)

Korean name
- Hangul: 서울 신당동 박정희 가옥
- Hanja: 서울 新堂洞 朴正熙 家屋
- RR: Seoul Sindang-dong Bak Jeonghui gaok
- MR: Sŏul Sindang-dong Pak Chŏnghŭi kaok

A family home of former South Korean President Park Chung Hee is located in Sindang-dong, Jung District, Seoul, South Korea. It was designated a National Registered Cultural Heritage of South Korea on October 10, 2008, and has been preserved as a history museum that is open to the public.

== Description ==
Park and his children—including his daughter, future president Park Geun-hye—lived in the home from May 1958 to August 1961. After Park seized power in the 1961 May 16 coup, he moved out of the home, but still owned it until his 1979 assassination. After Park's death, Park Geun-hye returned to the home and lived there alone for a year.

The building has two floors, with one above ground and one underground. The building takes up 123.97 square metres (1,334.4 ft^{2}) and has a floor area of 128.93 m^{2} (1,387.8 ft^{2}).

In 2015, it was reported that the museum saw around 200 visitors a day, who were mainly older South Korean conservatives. The building is now owned by a foundation established in memory of Park's wife, Yuk Young-soo.

== Gallery ==
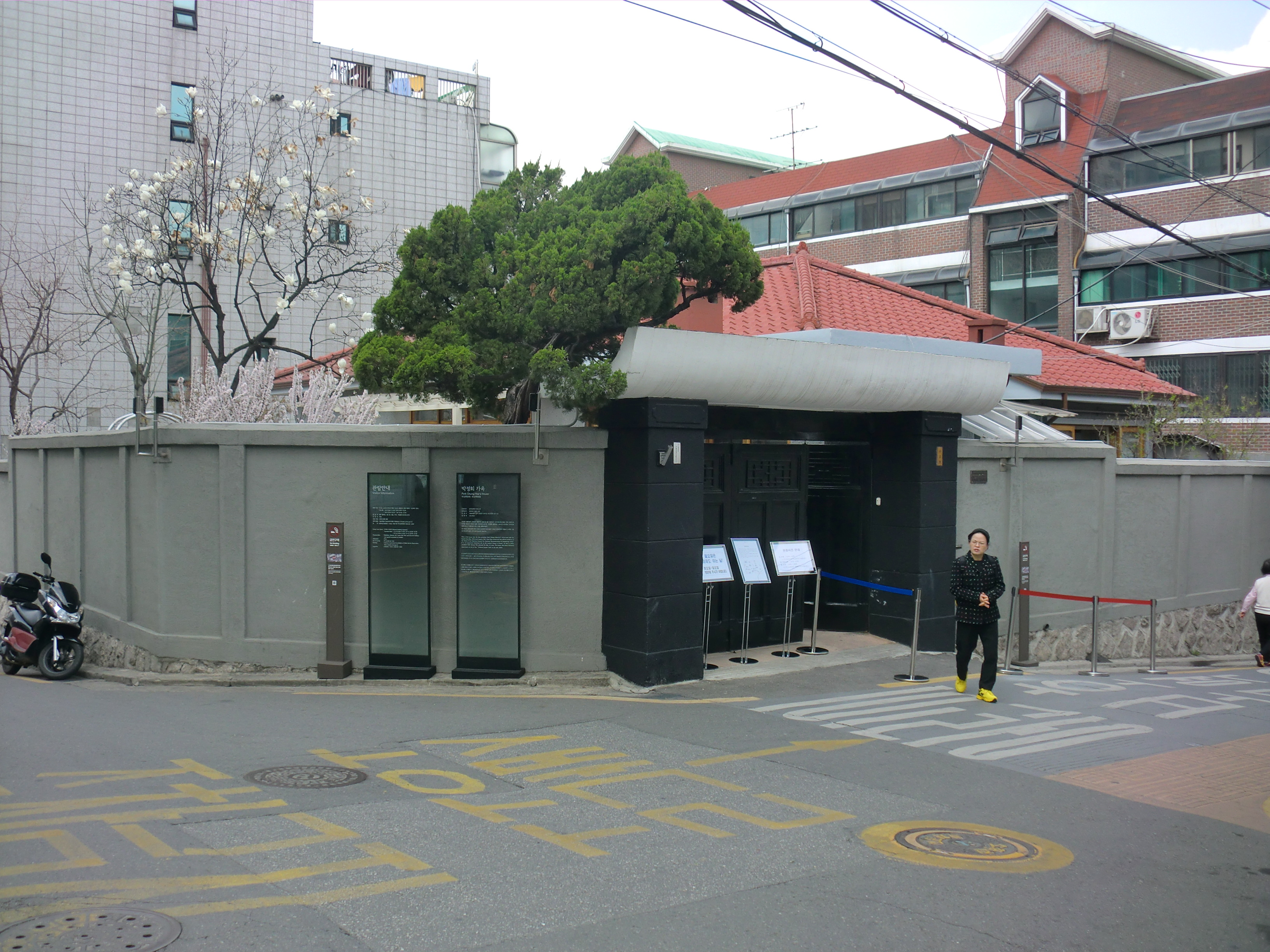
Exterior (2016)

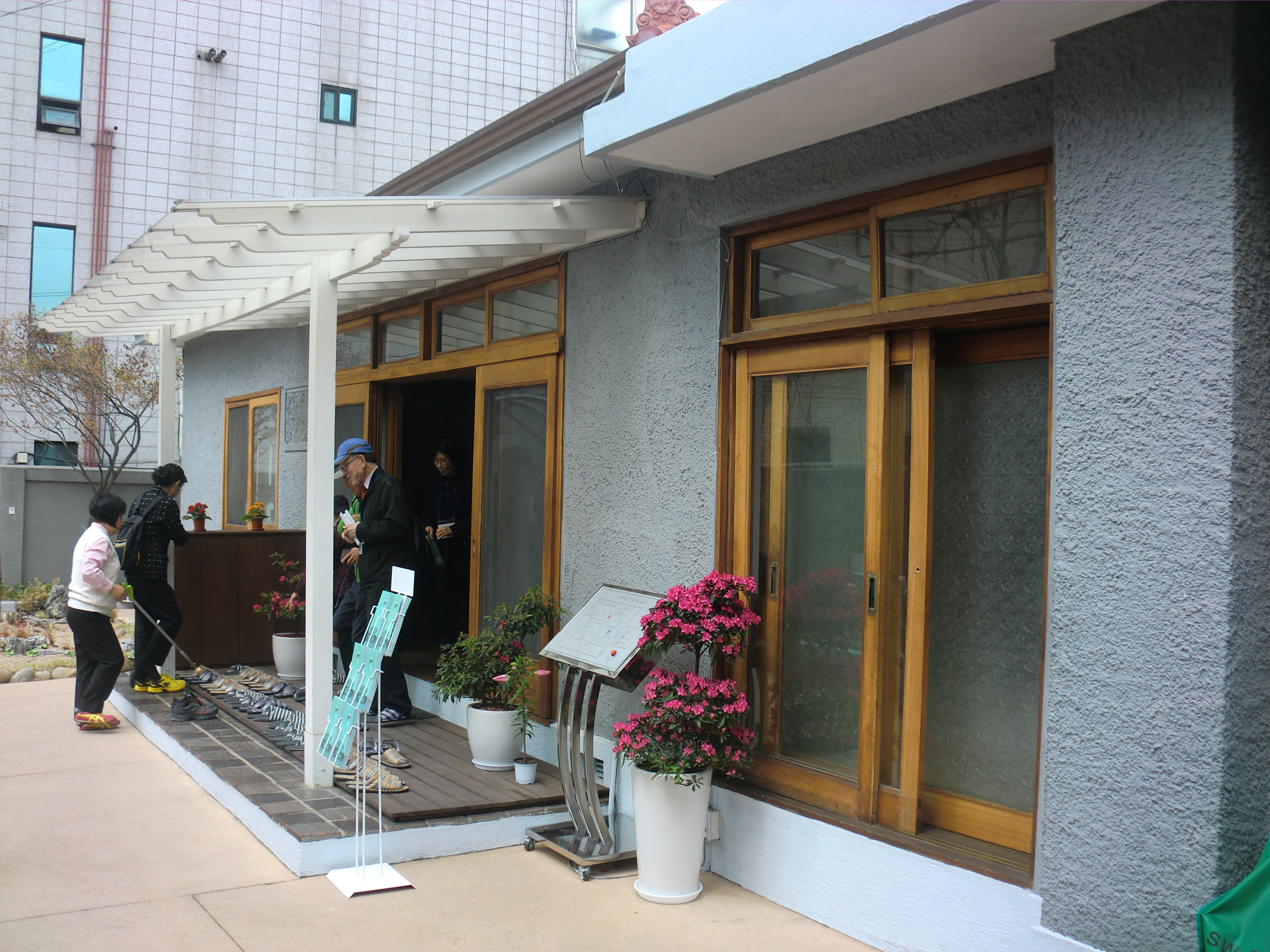
Visitors to the exhibit removing their shoes before entering the house (2016)

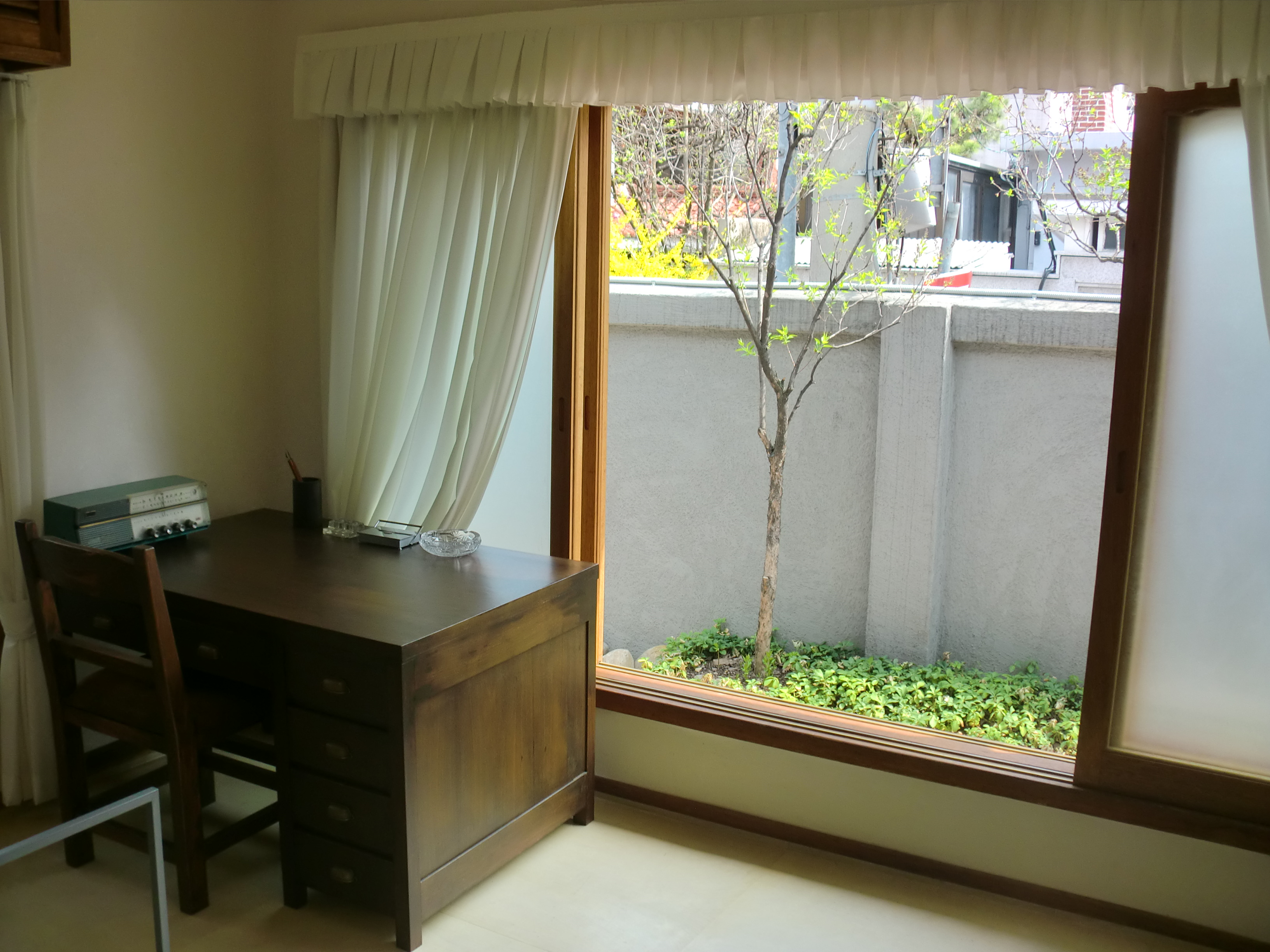
Room (2016)

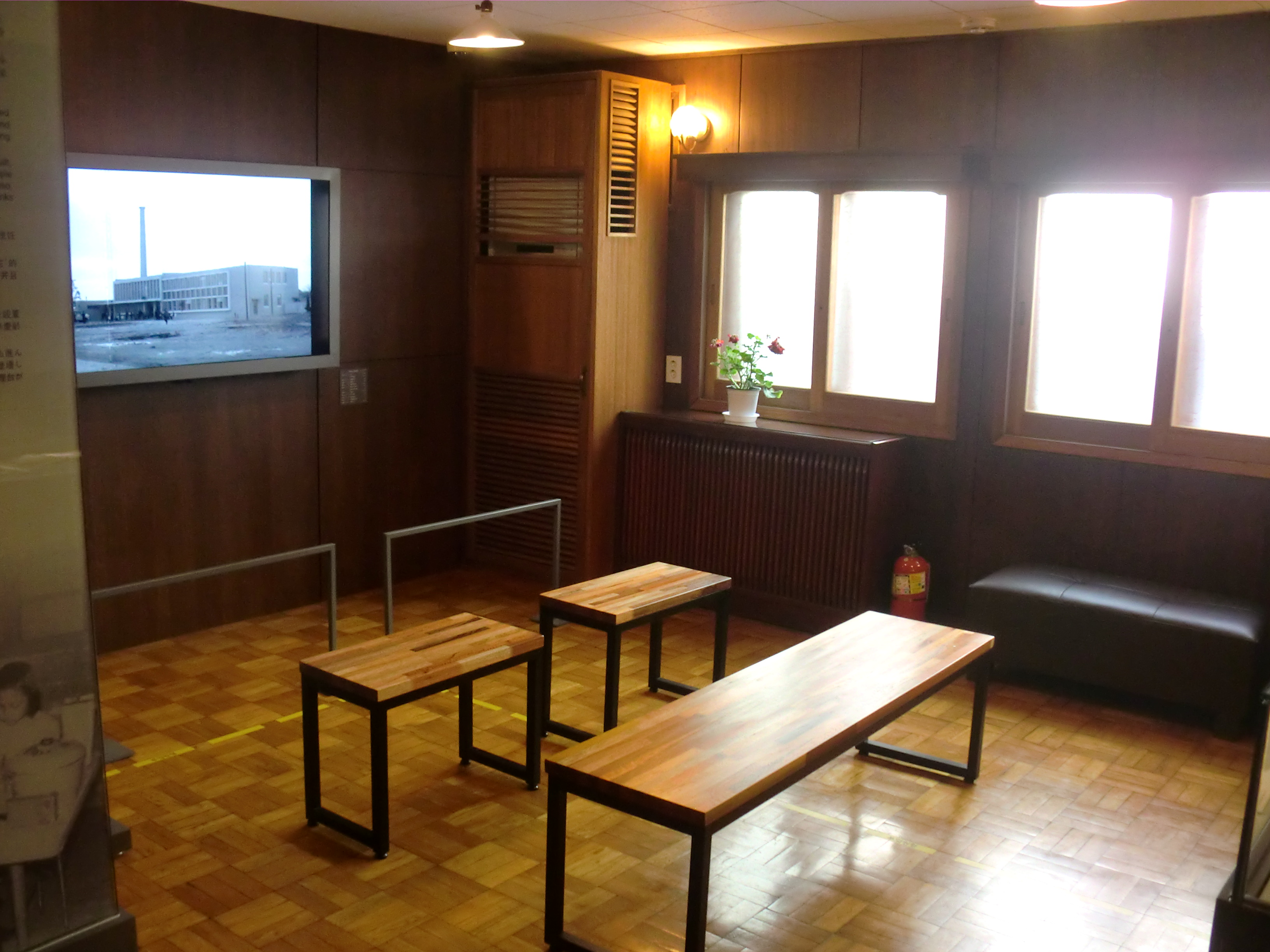
Room (2016)

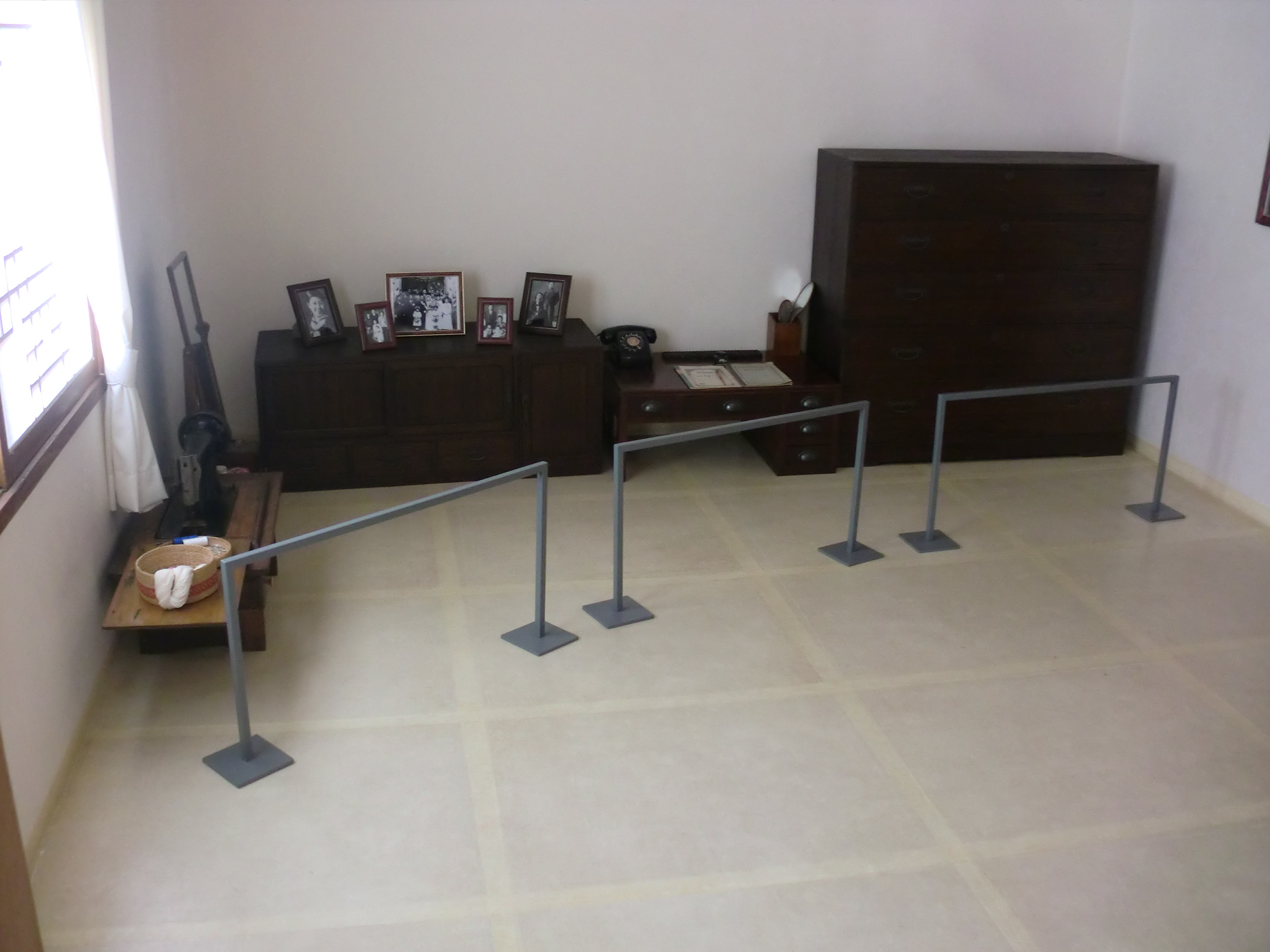
Room (2016)
