= Gwanghui-dong =

Neighborhood in Seoul, South Korea

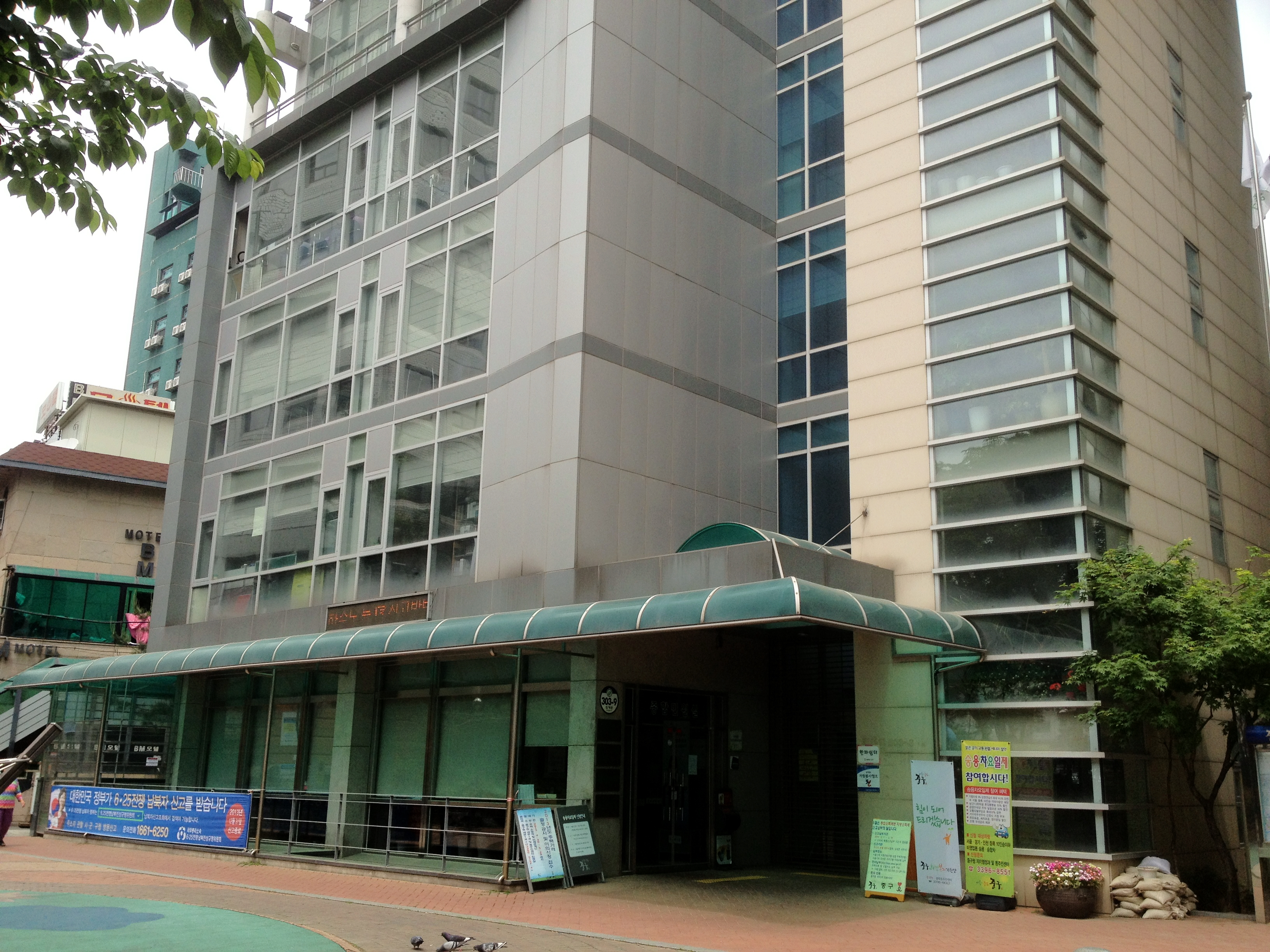
- Gwanghui-dong Resident Office

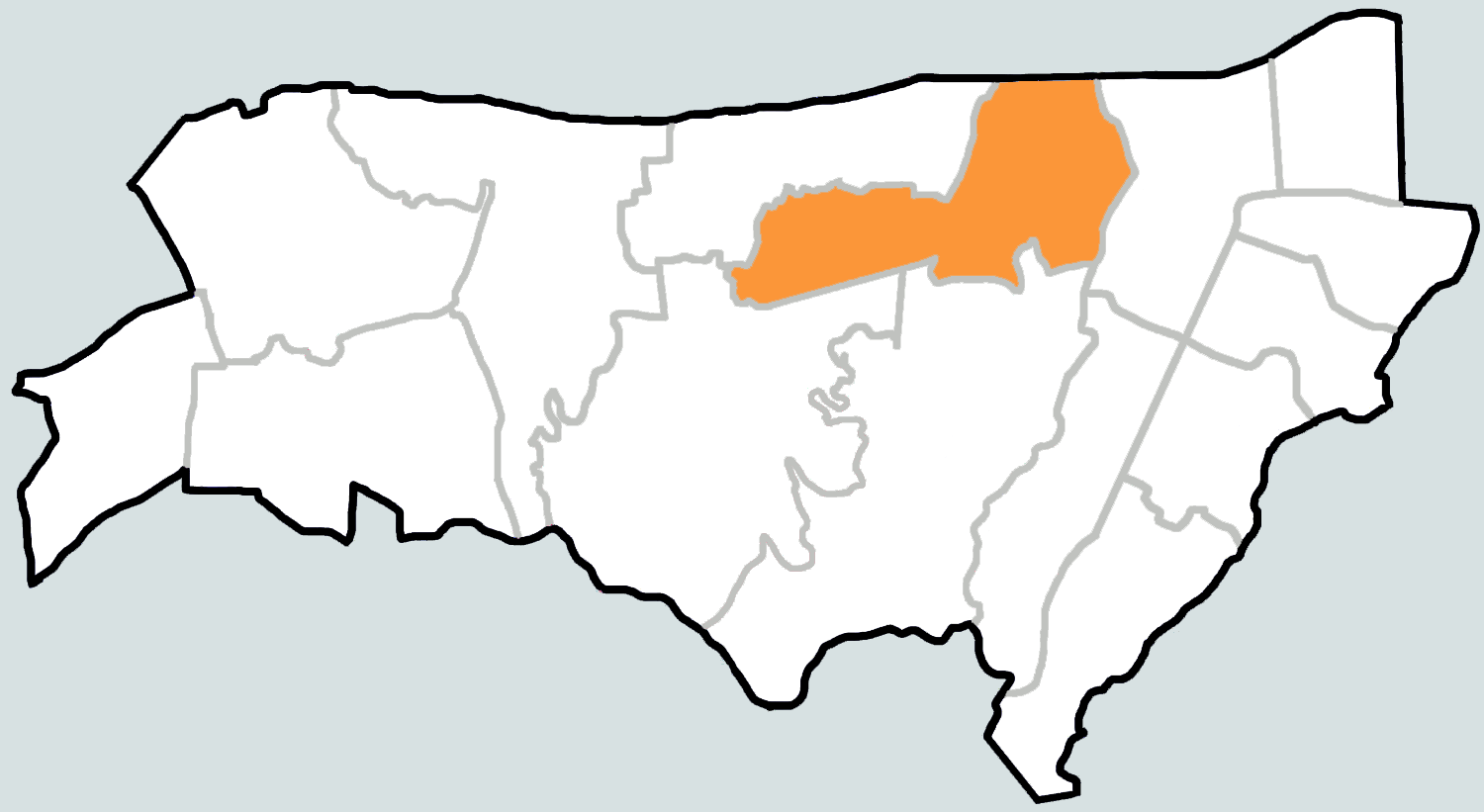
- Country: South Korea

Area
  - Total: 0.76 km^{2} (0.29 sq mi)

Population (2013)
  - Total: 5,401
  - Density: 7,100/km^{2} (18,000/sq mi)

Korean name
- Hangul: 광희동
- Hanja: 光熙洞
- RR: Gwanghui-dong
- MR: Kwanghŭi-dong

Gwanghui-dong (Korean: 광희동) is a dong (neighborhood) of Jung District, Seoul, South Korea.

The area is known for its Central Asia Street, which has a high population of people from Central Asia, including Koryo-saram (ethnic Koreans from the former Soviet Union).

== Transportation ==
- Dongdaemun History & Culture Park Station of, of and of

== See also ==
- Administrative divisions of South Korea
