= Dongdaemun History & Culture Park =

Park in Seoul, South Korea

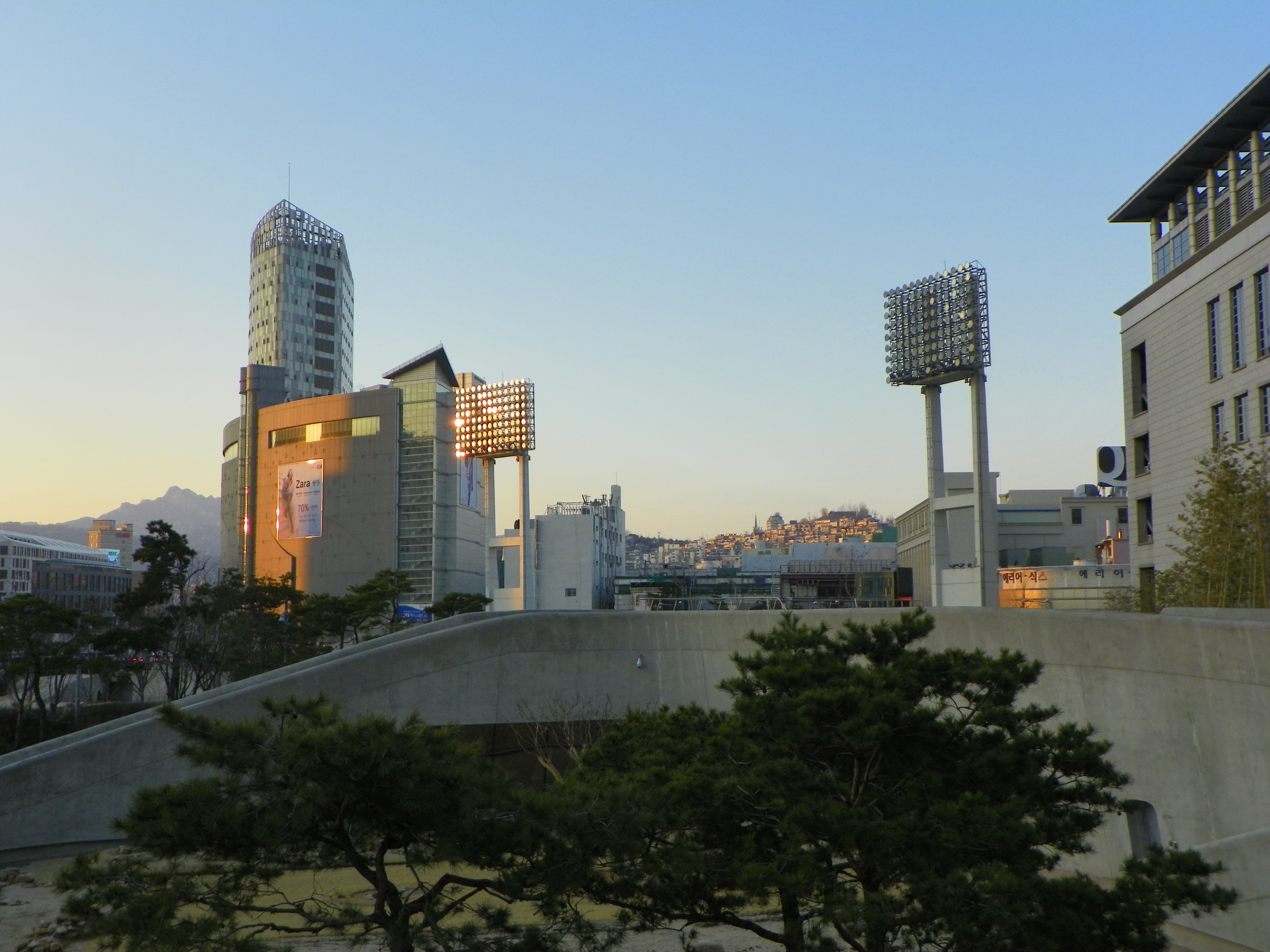
- Exterior of the Dongdaemun Design Plaza in the park (2013)
- Interactive map of Dongdaemun History & Culture Park
- Location: 281, Eulji-ro, Jung District, Seoul, South Korea
- Coordinates: 37°34′02″N 127°00′37″E

Korean name
- Hangul: 동대문역사문화공원
- RR: Dongdaemun yeoksa munhwa gongwon
- MR: Tongdaemun yŏksa munhwa kongwŏn

Dongdaemun History & Culture Park (Korean: 동대문역사문화공원) is a park in Jung District, Seoul, South Korea. It is on the location of the former Dongdaemun Stadium.

It is open throughout the year, at all hours. From 7 pm until midnight, there is a garden of artificial roses with lights in them that are lit up. The park is accessible from the Dongdaemun History & Culture Park station of the Seoul Metropolitan Subway.

The park contains a number of attractions, including the Yigansumun Water Gate, the Dongdaemun History Museum, the Dongdaemun Excavation Site Exhibition Hall, Dongdaemun Stadium Memorial, an event hall, and the Dongdaemun Design Plaza.

When the stadium was being demolished, 1,000 relics and 44 building sites, with the oldest being from the Joseon period, were uncovered.

== Gallery ==
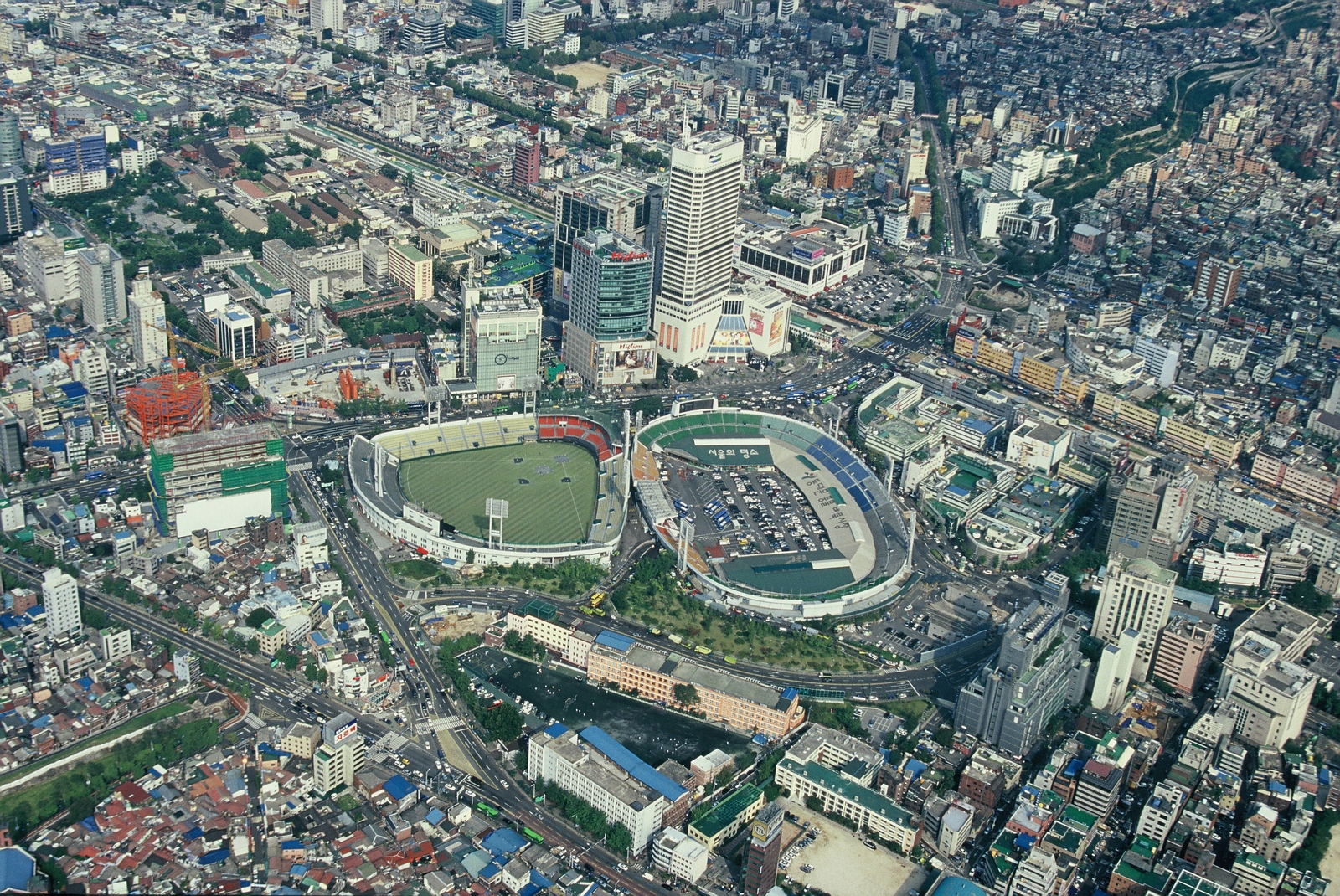
An aerial view of the former stadium before it was replaced by the park (August 2005)

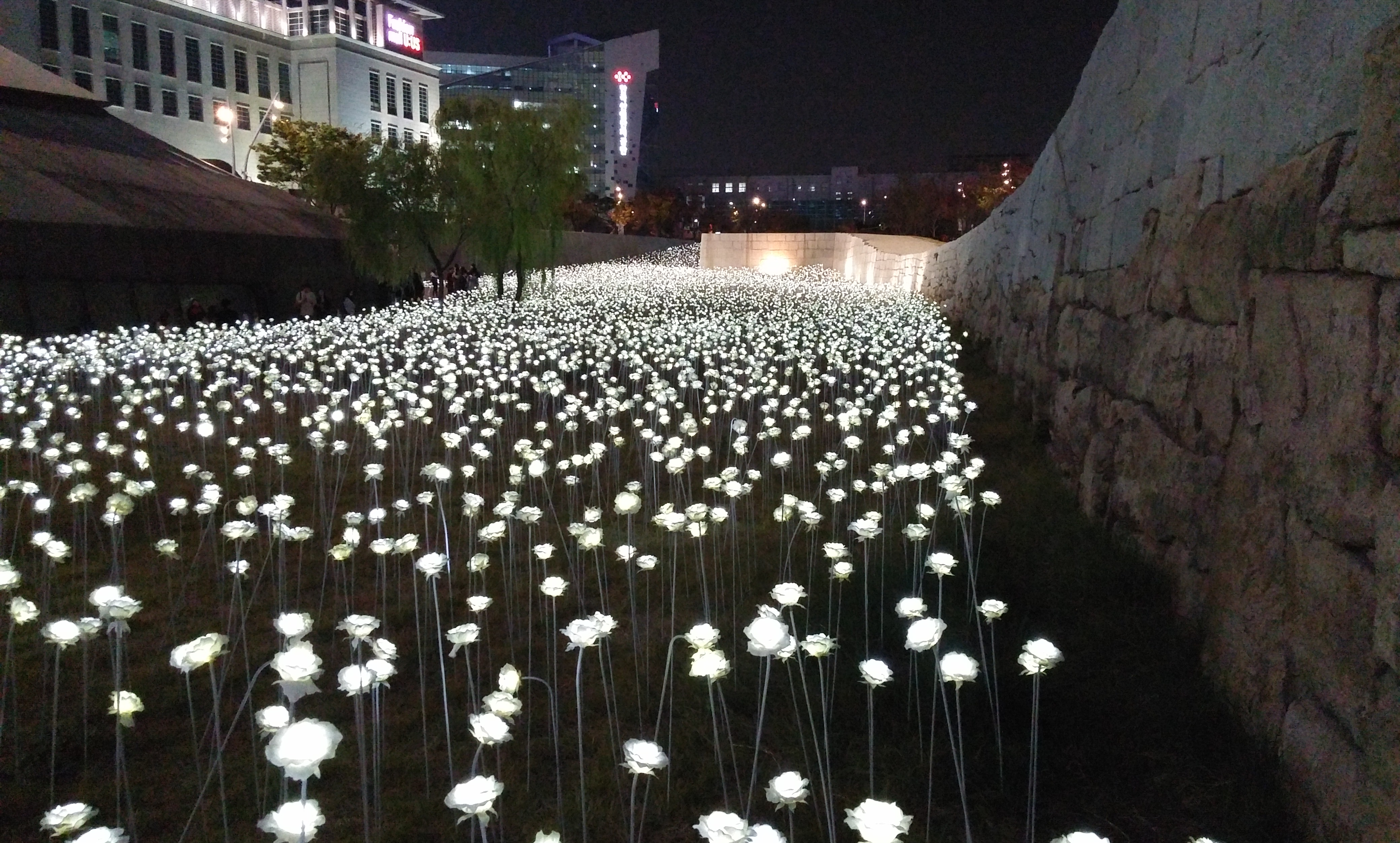
Electric roses lit up at night (2015)
