= Sindang-dong =

Neighbourhood in Seoul, South Korea

Coordinates: 35°48′N 128°26′E

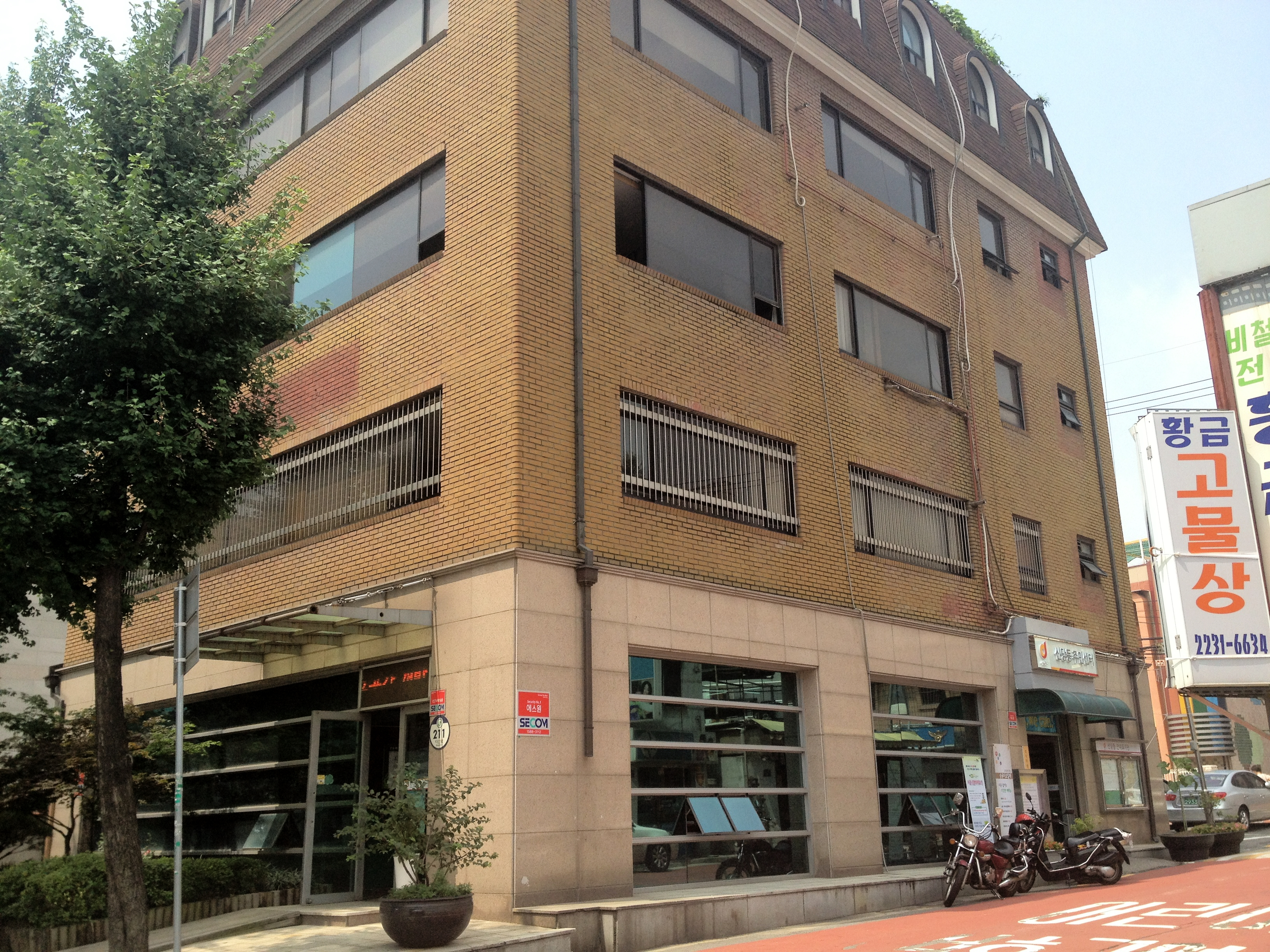
- Sindang-dong Resident Office

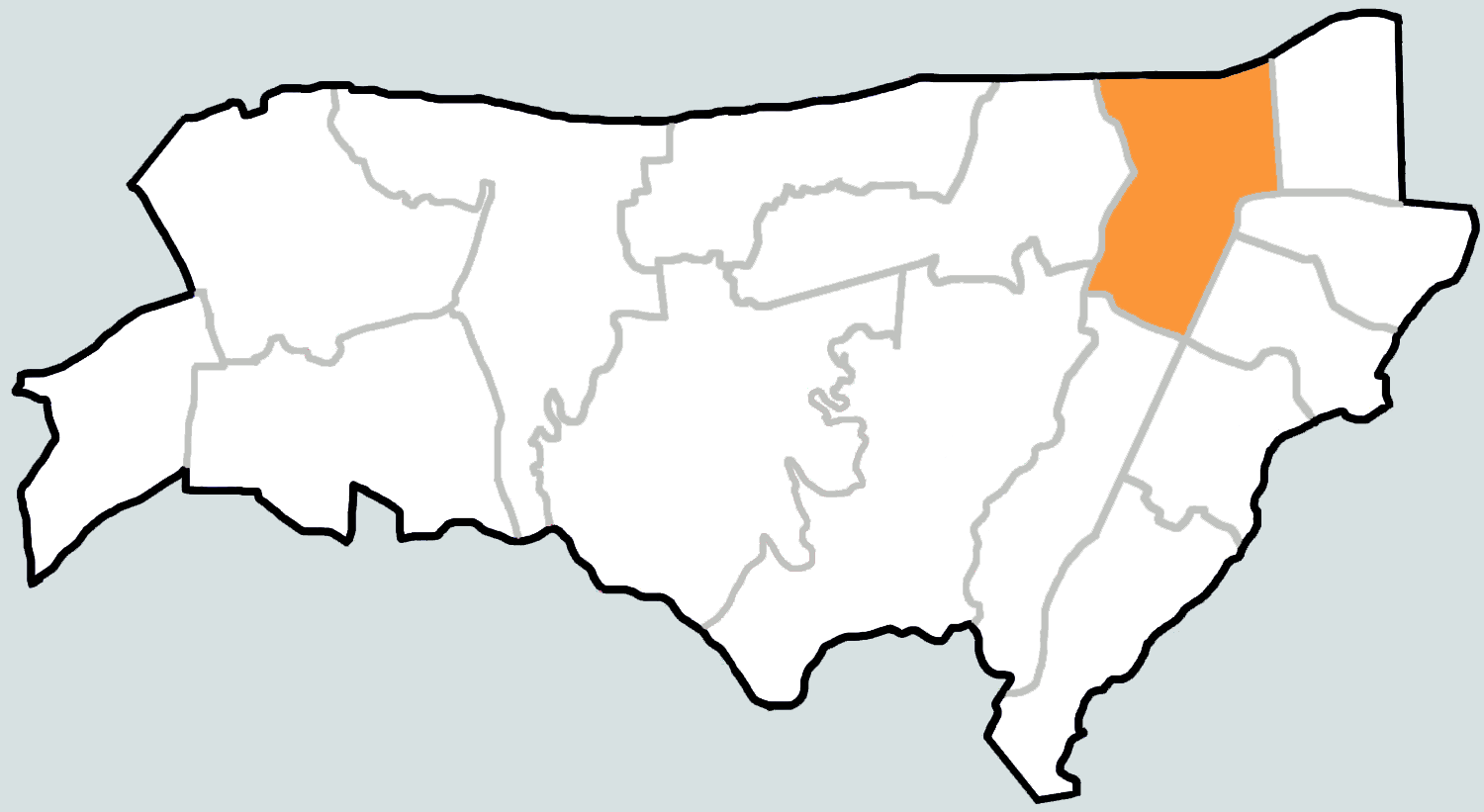
- Country: South Korea

Area
  - Total: 0.55 km^{2} (0.21 sq mi)

Population (2013)
  - Total: 7,712
  - Density: 14,000/km^{2} (36,000/sq mi)

Korean name
- Hangul: 신당동
- Hanja: 新堂洞
- RR: Sindang-dong
- MR: Sindang-dong

Sindang-dong (Korean: 신당동) is a dong (neighbourhood) of Jung District, Seoul, South Korea.

== Name origin ==
The name "Sin-dang-dong" came from an ancient village with a shrine for worshipping gods, which was connected to the place of worship. "Heung-in-dong," situated west of Dasan Road, got its name from "Heung-in Ji-mun" in Dongdaemun. As for "Mu-hak-dong," found southwest of the Sin-dang-dong intersection, it derived its name from Mt. Mu-hak-bong (92m) south of the Korea Road Traffic Authority, with a legend that a crane descended and danced on the mountain.

== Attractions ==
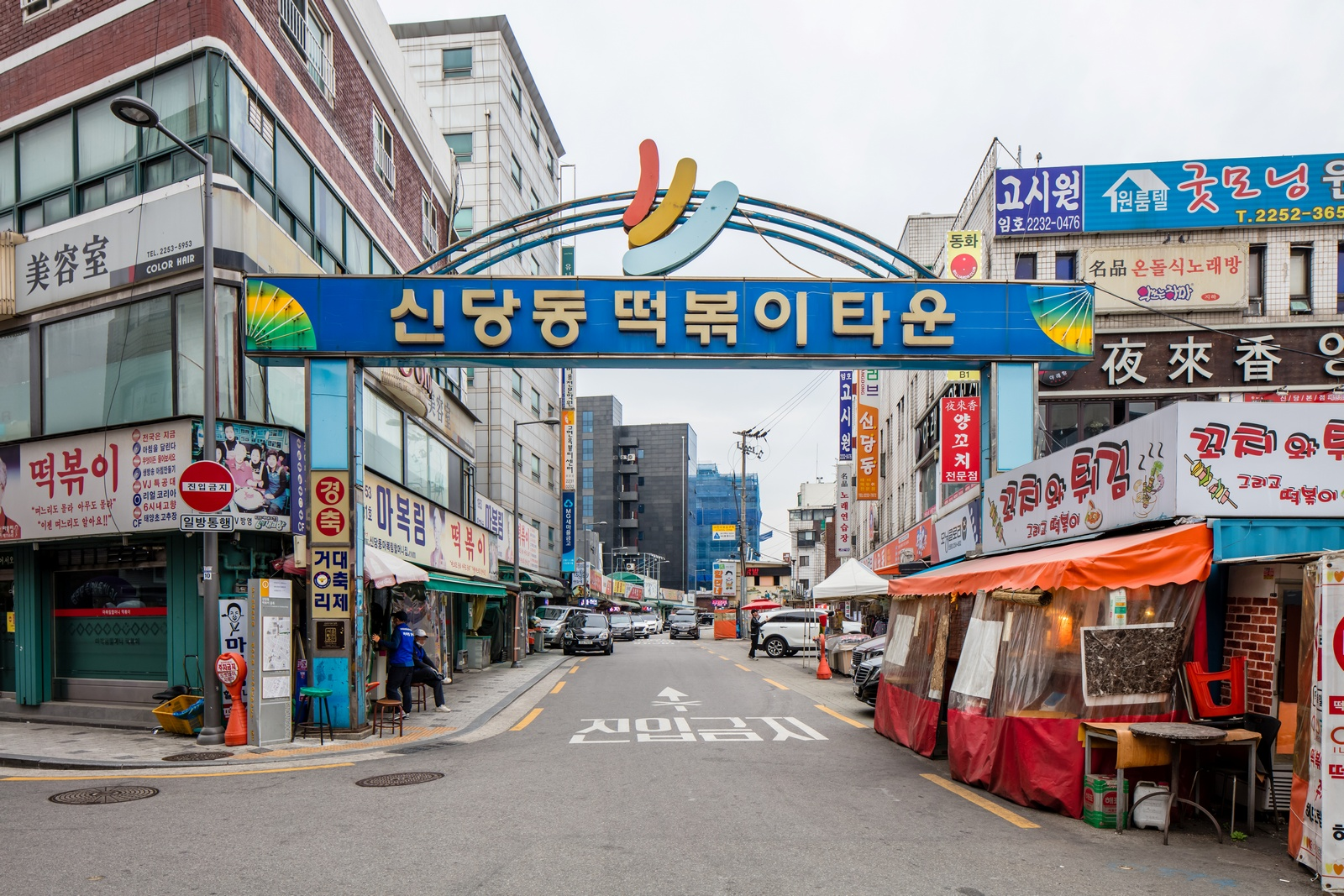
Entrance of the Sindang-dong Tteokbokki town (신당동 떡볶이 타운)

The neighbourhood is near Sindang Station and is approximately two blocks from exit 8. It is a popular shopping area with a variety of food markets, and eateries that specialise in Korean snacks such as Ddeokbokki. It is known to Koreans for its Ddeokbokki Town.

A former home of South Korean president Park Chung Hee is located in the neighborhood and is open to public visitation.

== Transportation ==
- Sindang Station of and of
- Cheonggu Station of and of

== See also ==
- Administrative divisions of South Korea
