= Dongdaemun History & Culture Park station =

Station of the Seoul Metropolitan Subway

| 동대문역사문화공원 (DDP); Dongdaemun History & Culture Park (DDP) |
| 동대문역사문화공원 (DDP); Dongdaemun History & Culture Park (DDP) |
| 동대문역사문화공원 (DDP); Dongdaemun History & Culture Park (DDP) |
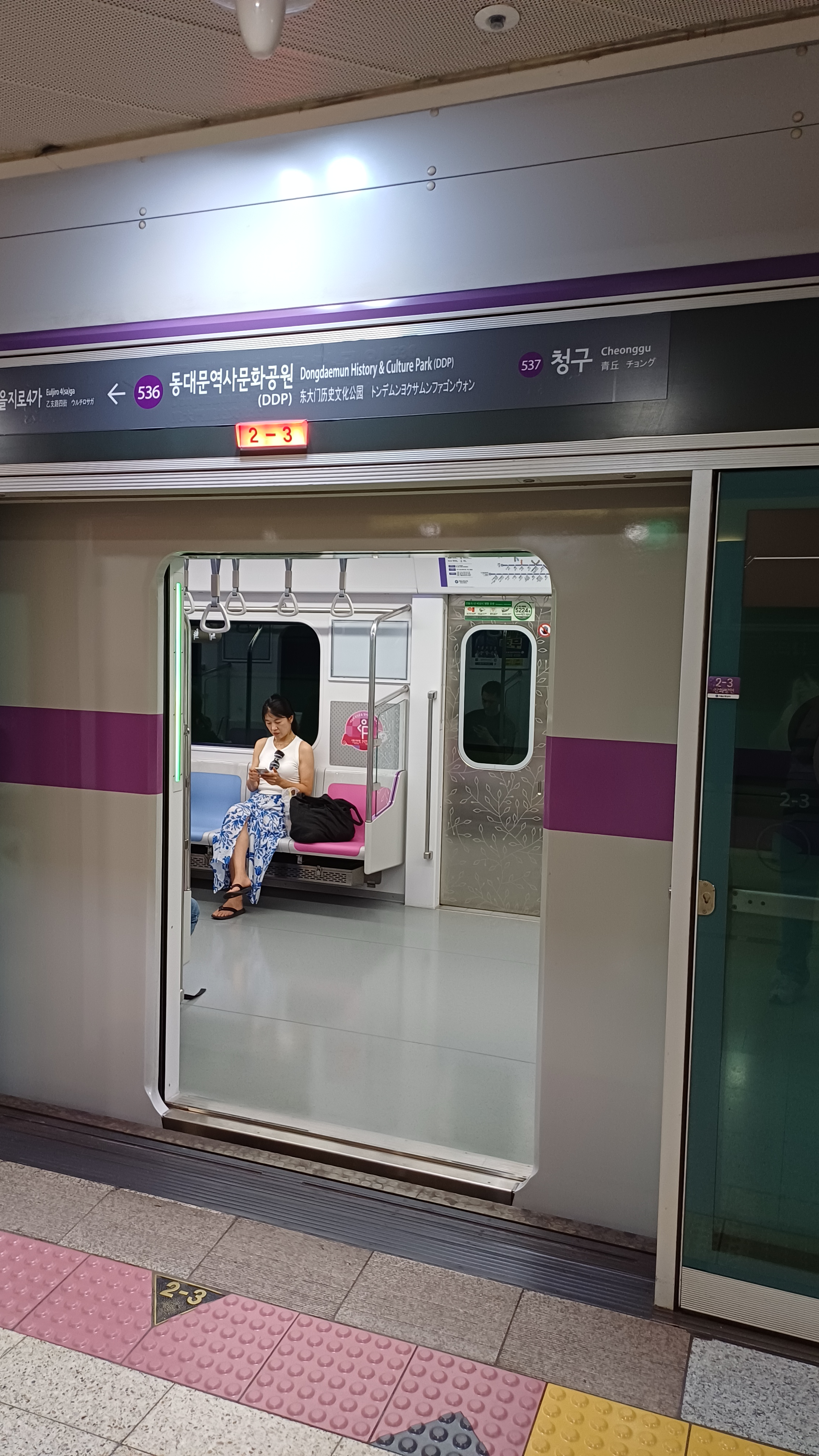

Korean name
- Hangul: 동대문역사문화공원역
- Hanja: 東大門歷史文化公園驛
- Revised Romanization: Dongdaemun-nyeoksa-munhwa-gongwon-nyeok
- McCune–Reischauer: Tongdaemun-nyŏksa-munhwa-gongwŏn-nyŏk

General information
- Location: 1 Euljiro 7-ga, Jung-gu, Seoul
- Coordinates: 37°33′54″N 127°00′28″E
- Operator: Seoul Metro
- Lines: Line 2 Line 4 Line 5
- Platforms: 4
- Tracks: 6

Construction
- Structure type: Underground

History
- Former names: Dongdaemun Stadium

Key dates
- 16 September 1983: Line 2 opened
- 18 October 1985: Line 4 opened
- 30 December 1996: Line 5 opened

Passengers
- (Daily) Based on Jan-Dec of 2012. Line 2: 34,683; Line 4: 41,259; Line 5: 5,836
Services
| Preceding station | Seoul Metropolitan Subway | Following station |
|---|---|---|
| Euljiro 4(sa)-ga Next counterclockwise | Line 2 | Sindang Next clockwise |
| Dongdaemun towards Jinjeop | Line 4 | Chungmuro towards Oido |
| Euljiro 4(sa)-ga towards Banghwa | Line 5 | Cheonggu towards Hanam Geomdansan or Macheon |
Location

Dongdaemun History & Culture Park station (Korean: 동대문역사문화공원) is a station on Line 2, Line 4 and Line 5 of the Seoul Metropolitan Subway. It is named for the nearby Dongdaemun History & Culture Park. The huge Dongdaemun Market district is centered on this station and Dongdaemun Station, located to the north across Cheonggyecheon.

The Line 2 station is located in Euljiro-7-ga, Jung-gu, Seoul, and the Line 4 and 5 stations are located in Gwanghui-dong, Jung-gu, Seoul.

This station is also known to have the highest train-platform gap related accidents in the entire country of South Korea with the total of 365 feet accidents each year.

This station's Line 5 Transfer passageway was closed from 18 July 2018 to 20 September 2018 because of construction-related work.

== Vicinity ==
- Exit 1 : Dongdaemun Design Plaza & Park
- Exit 2 : Hanyang Middle & Technical High Schools
- Exit 13 : National Medical Center
- Exit 14 : Cheonggyecheon

The headquarters of South Korean food company CJ Cheil Jedang is in the CJ Cheiljedang Building in Ssangnim-dong, Jung-gu, nearby to the station.

== Gallery ==
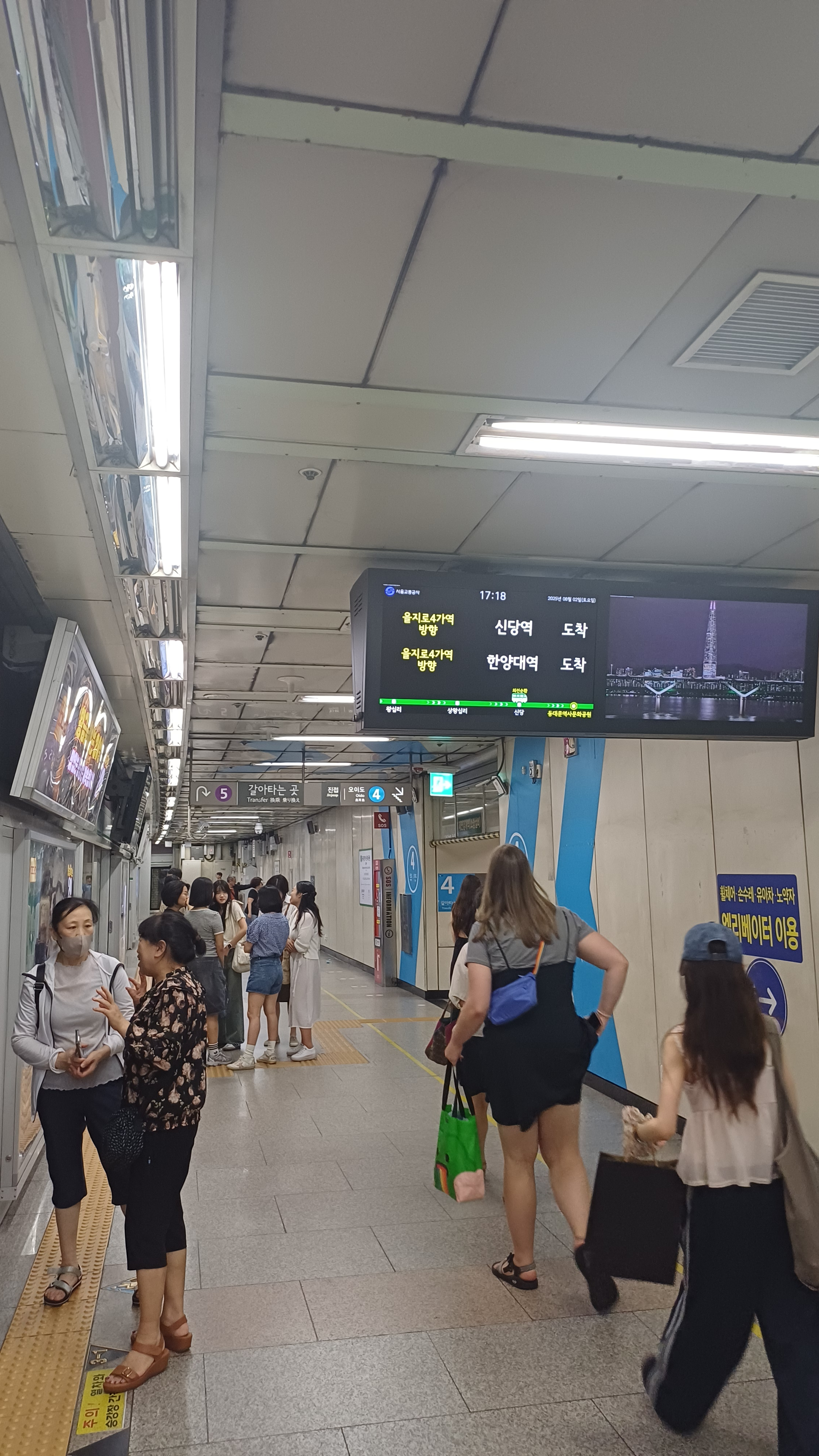
Line 2 platform

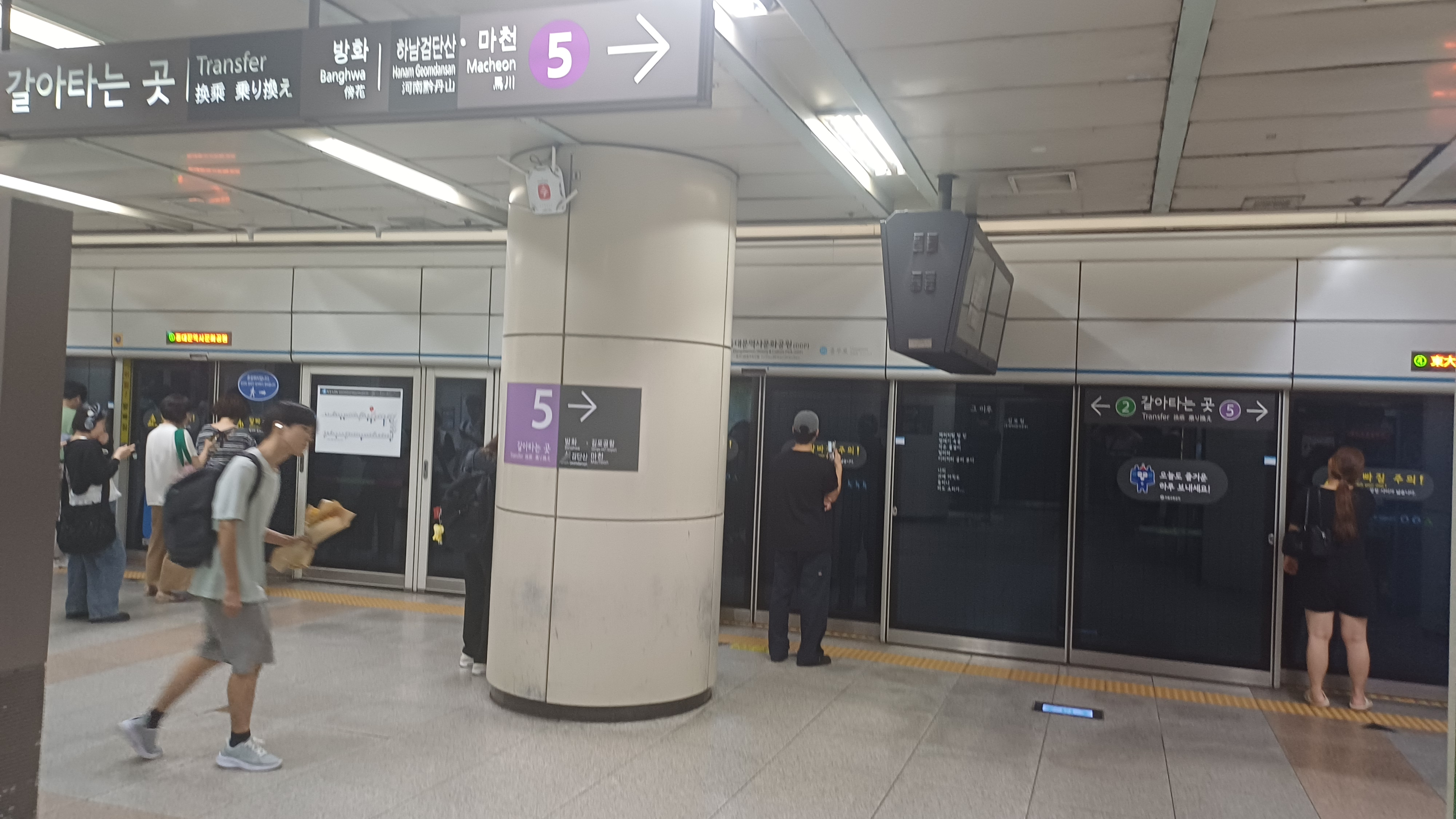
Line 4 platform

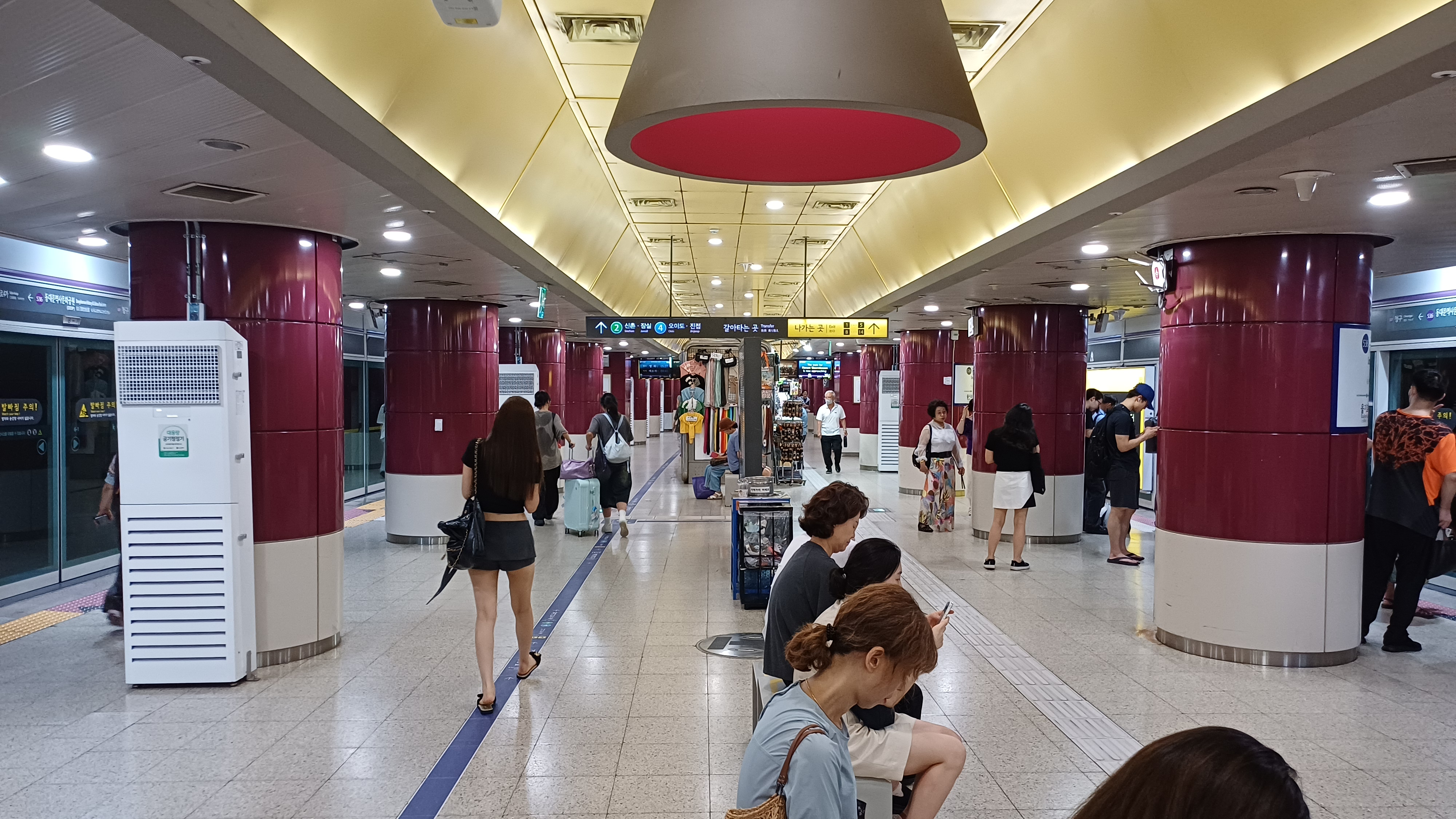
Line 5 platform

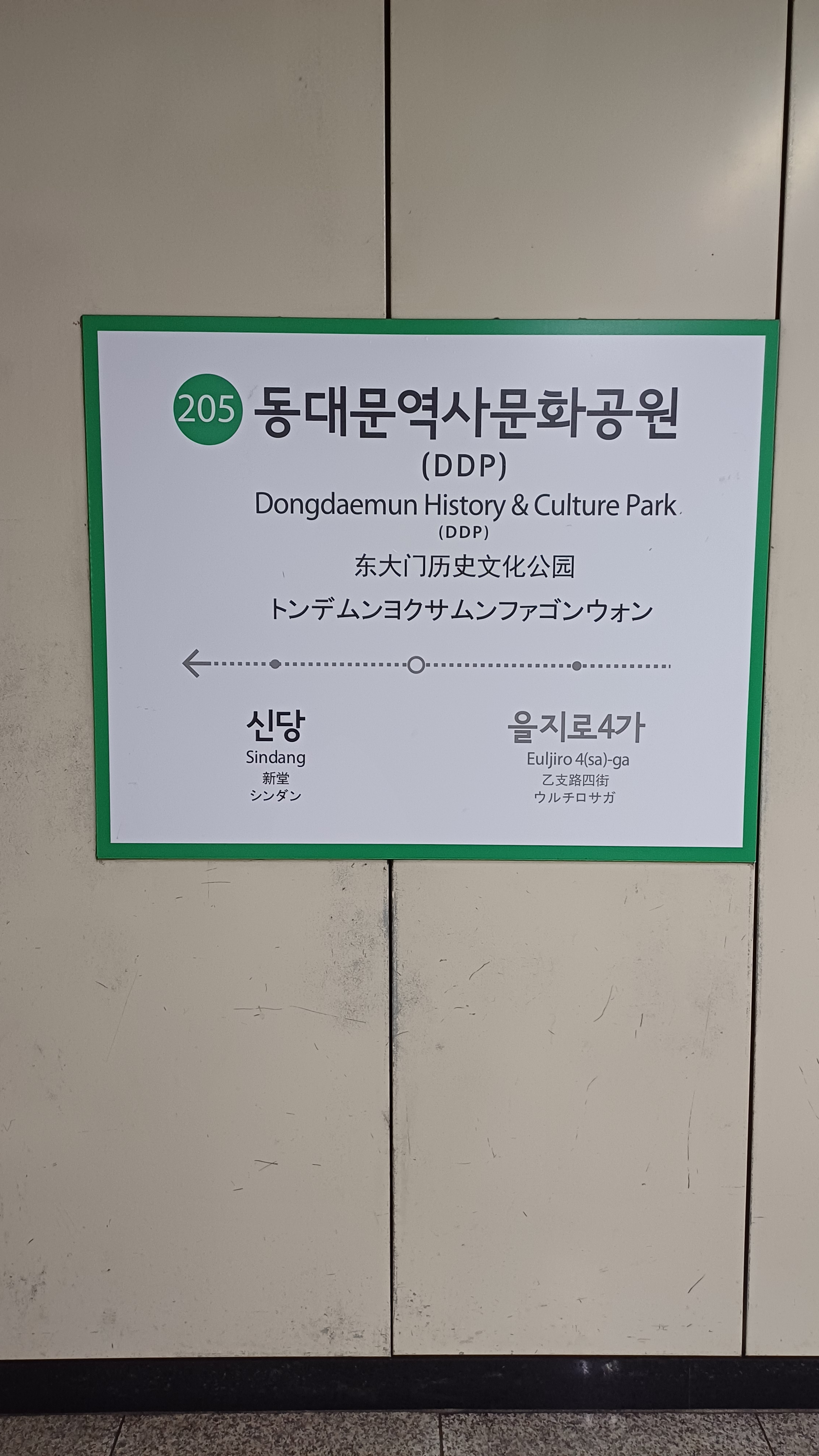
Line 2 station sign

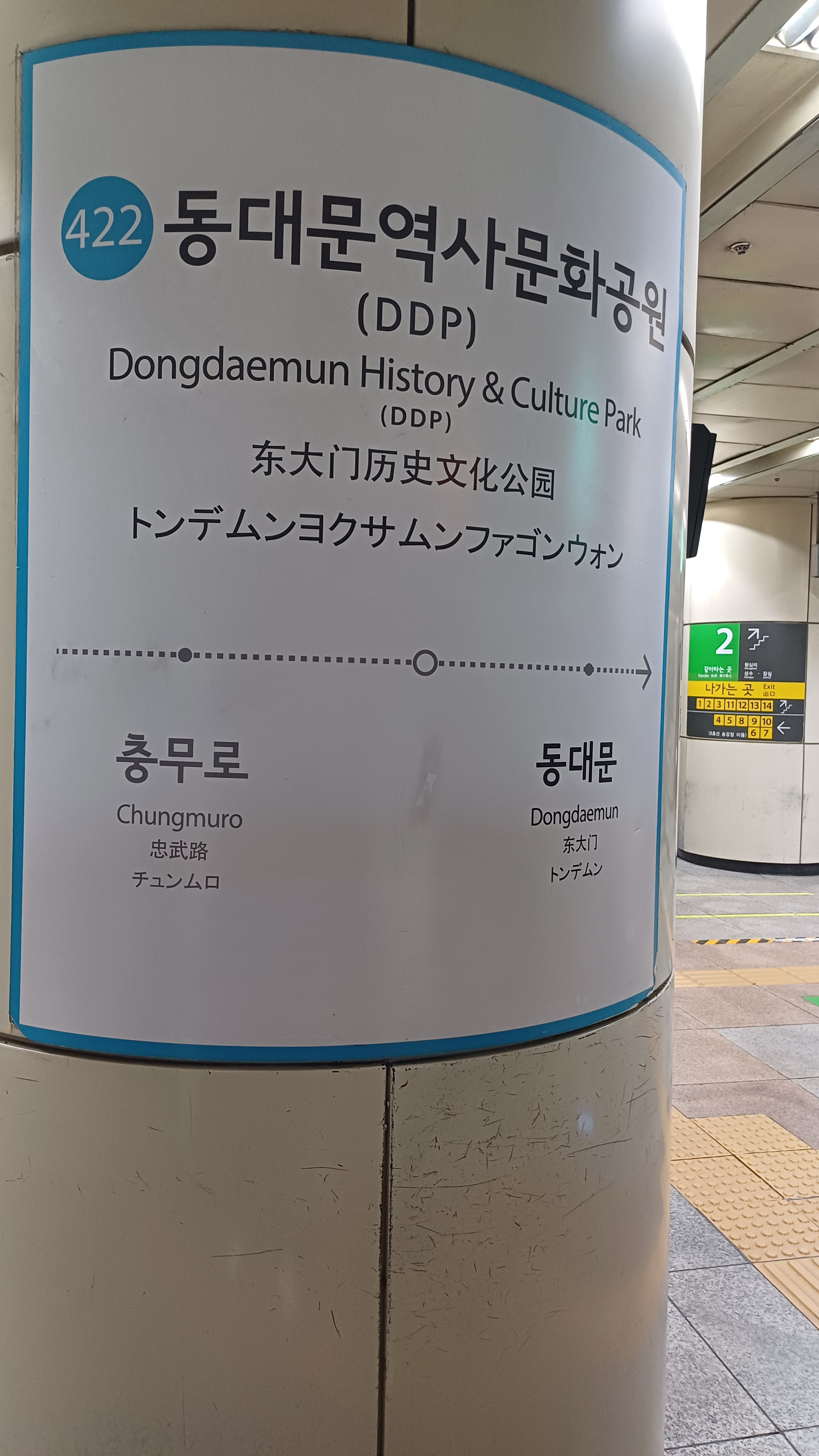
Line 4 station sign

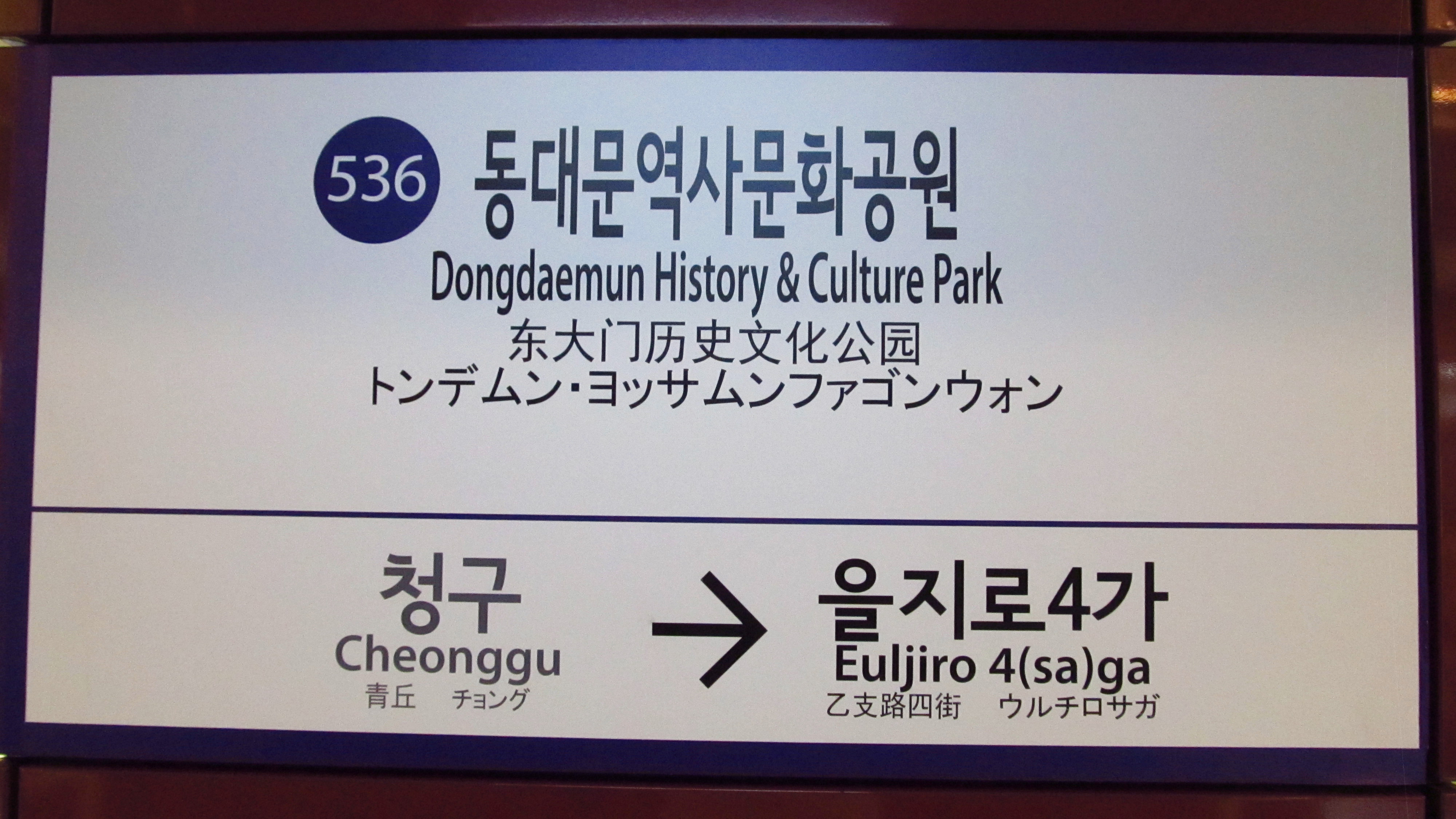
Line 5 station sign
