= Technical Art Studio Cell =

South Korean special effects company

- Native name: 테크니컬 아트 스튜디오 셀
- Romanized name: Technical Art Studio Cell
- Type: Private
- Industry: Entertainment; Mass media; Production
- Founded: June 25, 2003
- Founder: Hwang Hyo-gyun; Kwak Tae-yong
- Headquarters: 4-72, Deoki-ro 172beon-gil, Ilsanseo-gu, Goyang-si, Gyeonggi-do, South Korea
- Area served: South Korea
- Key people: Hwang Ho-gyun (co-CEO); Kwak Tae-yong (co-CEO)
- Number of employees: 20
- Website: www.cellart.co.kr

Technical Art Studio Cell (Korean: 테크니컬 아트 스튜디오 셀) is a prominent South Korean technical art and special effects makeup company. Established on June 25, 2003, by CEOs Hwang Ho-gyun and Kwak Tae-yong, the studio provides a wide range of services including special effects makeup, the creation of dummies, animatronics, and specialized props and set work. Known for their collaborative work with influential Korean directors such as Park Chan-wook, Bong Joon-ho, Kim Jee-woon, Ryoo Seung-wan, Park Hoon-jung, Choi Dong-hoon, Kim Yong-hwa, Yeon Sang-ho and Na Hong-jin, Technical Art Studio Cell has contributed to over 170 productions, including internationally acclaimed films like The Tiger: An Old Hunter's Tale (2015), Train to Busan (2016), Along with the Gods: The Two Worlds (2017), Along with the Gods: The Last 49 Days (2018), Okja (2017), Parasite (2019), 12.12: The Day (2023), Exhuma (2024).

== History ==
Technical Art Studio Cell was founded on June 25, 2003, by Hwang Hyo-gyun and Kwak Tae-yong. The two CEOs chose the name "Cell," referencing the basic biological unit and likening it to the smallest energy unit in a battery, symbolizing their fundamental role in production.

The company's first project was the short film "Cut" (2004), which was part of director Park Chan-wook's anthology feature Three, Monsters.

Cell gained significant recognition in 2005 for their complex work on Park Chan-wook's Lady Vengeance. For the film, they created the intricate, half-man, half-animal creature that appears in Geum-ja's (Lee Young-ae) illusion. Mr. Baek (Choi Min-sik), combination of a specialized dummy, animatronics, and animal component, was noted by Hwang Hyo-gyun as a project that significantly elevated Cell's technical capabilities and status in the industry.

In 2012, Cell made a robot for a lead role in the science fiction film Doomsday Book (2012) directed by Kim Jee-woon.

The company was formally incorporated on July 17, 2015.

In 2017, Cell reunite with Bong Joon Ho in his film Okja.

Extreme Job.

Cell was responsible for creating several key props and practical effects for Parasite (2019), including the scholar's rock (pebble) and the peach. Kwak stated, "When we were filming the movie, it wasn't the season for peaches, and more than anything, special production was inevitable in order to realistically express the scene where Ki-jeong (Park So-dam) peels the peach fuzz with a box cutter." Cell also created a critical makeup effect: in the scene where the mood shifts from comedy to thriller, when the displaced housekeeper Moon-gwang (Lee Jung-eun) rings the doorbell in the pouring rain, Moon-gwang's swollen face was a practical effect created by Cell.

In 2019, Cell moved its operations to a new, dedicated three stories building.

Since 2017, Cell has been involved in the production of Netflix originals such as "Okja" (2017), "Kingdom," "Sweet Home" and "The Silent Sea" (2021).

== Team ==
Team Members and Filmography
| Name | Specialty | Role | Selected Filmography (Chronological) | Ref. |
|---|---|---|---|---|
| Co-CEO | Hwang Hyo-gyun | Special effects makeup and dummies (majored in painting). | Mother (2009), Thirst (2009), I Saw the Devil (2010), Human Destruction Report (2010), Howling (2011), The Thieves (2012), Berlin Files (2012), Gwanghae: The Man Who Became King (2012), A Werewolf Boy (2012), Love Poem (2012), The Face Reader (2013), Cold (2013), Hwayi: A Monster Boy (2013), Mr. Go (2013), Gyeongseong School: The Lost Girls (2014), Kundo: Age of Rampant (2014), Veteran (2014), Assassination (2015). | |
| Co-CEO | Kwak Tae-yong | Animatronics, special props, and interactive mechanics. | The Host (2006), The Cut (2007), The Good, the Bad, the Weird (2008), Thirst (2009), I Saw the Devil (2010), The Yellow Sea (2010), Howling (2011), Deranged (2012), Berlin (2012), Flu (2013), Kundo: Age of the Rampant (2013). | |
| Director | Lee Hee-eun | Dummy expert | | |
| Manager | Park Young-moo | Special effects | Detective K: Secret of the Lost Island, Gangnam 1970, The Silenced, Chronicle of a Blood Merchant, The Treacherous, Assassination, Inside Men, The Priests, The Tiger, Veteran, The Age of Shadows, Asura, SORI: Voice from the Heart, Train to Busan, Tunnel (2016), The Battleship Island, Fabricated City, Seven Years of Night, The Villainess (all 2017). | |
| Manager | Park Shin-young | special effects makeup | | |
| Manager | Lee Hyo-eung | special effects makeup | | |
| Team leader | Lee Go-woon | special effects makeup | | |
| Team leader | Park So-yeon | special effects makeup | | |
| Team Member | Kim Yu-seon | special effects makeup | | |
| Team Member | Choi Joo-hyung | special effects makeup | Parasite, Extreme Job, Along with the Gods, Kingdom, The Witch: Part 1 | |

Former team member:

- Pi Dae-seong (2006–2013)
- Kim Ho-sik

== Filmography ==
=== Film ===
Film credit of Cell
| Year | Title | | Director | Note | Ref. |
| Year | English | Korean | Director | Note | Ref. |
|---|---|---|---|---|---|
| 2004 | Three... Extremes: Cut | 쓰리, 몬스터 - '컷(Cut)' | Park Chan-wook | | |
| 2005 | A Bittersweet Life | 달콤한 인생 | Kim Jee-woon | | |
| 2005 | Antarctic Journal | 남극일기 | Yim Pil-sung | | |
| 2005 | Lady Vengeance | 친절한 금자씨 | Park Chan-wook | | |
| 2005 | Boy Goes to Heaven | 소년, 천국에 가다 | Yoon Tae-yong | | |
| 2006 | The Host | 괴물 | Bong Joon Ho | | |
| 2007 | The Cut | 해부학교실 | Son Tae-woong | | |
| 2008 | The Good, the Bad, the Weird | 좋은 놈, 나쁜 놈, 이상한 놈 | Kim Jee-woon | | |
| 2009 | Thirst | 박쥐 | Park Chan-wook | | |
| 2009 | Mother | 마더 | Bong Joon Ho | | |
| 2010 | I Saw the Devil | 악마를 보았다 | Kim Jee-woon | | |
| 2012 | Howling | 하울링 | Yoo Ha | | |
| 2012 | Deranged | 연가시 | Park Jung-woo | | |
| 2012 | The Thieves | 도둑들 | Choi Dong-hoon | | |
| 2012 | Masquerade | 광해: 왕이 된 남자 | Choo Chang-min | | |
| 2012 | A Werewolf Boy | 늑대소년 | Jo Sung-hee | | |
| 2012 | Doomsday Book | 인류멸망보고서 | Kim Jee-woon; Yim Pil-sung | | |
| 2013 | The Berlin File | 베를린 | Ryoo Seung-wan | | |
| 2013 | The Face Reader | 관상 | Han Jae-rim | | |
| 2013 | Hwayi: A Monster Boy | 화이: 괴물을 삼킨 아이 | Jang Joon-hwan | | |
| 2013 | Flu | 감기 | Kim Sung-su | | |
| 2013 | Mr. Go | 미스터 고 | Kim Yong-hwa | | |
| 2014 | Kundo: Age of the Rampant | 군도: 민란의 시대 | Yoon Jong-bin | | |
| 2015 | Veteran | 베테랑 | Ryoo Seung-wan | | |
| 2015 | The Silenced | 경성학교: 사라진 소녀들 | Lee Hae-young | | |
| 2015 | The Tiger | 대호 | Park Hoon-jung | | |
| 2015 | The Himalaya | 히말라야 | Lee Seok-hoon | | |
| 2015 | Assassination | 암살 | Choi Dong-hoon | | |
| 2016 | The Age of Shadows | 밀정 | Kim Jee-woon | | |
| 2016 | Train to Busan | 부산행 | Yeon Sang-ho | | |
| 2016 | The Handmaiden | 아가씨 | Park Chan-wook | | |
| 2017 | The Battleship Island | 군함도 | Ryoo Seung-wan | | |
| 2017 | Okja | 옥자 | Bong Joon Ho | | |
| 2017 | V.I.P. | 브이아이피 | Park Hoon-jung | | |
| 2017 | Along with the Gods: The Two Worlds | 신과함께: 죄와 벌 | Kim Yong-hwa | | |
| 2017 | Fabricated City | 조작된 도시 | Park Kwang-hyun | | |
| 2017 | The Villainess | 악녀 | Jung Byung-gil | | |
| 2018 | Illang: The Wolf Brigade | 인랑 | Kim Jee-woon | | |
| 2018 | Along with the Gods: The Last 49 Days | 신과함께: 인과 연 | Kim Yong-hwa | | |
| 2018 | Seven Years of Night | 7년의 밤 | Choo Chang-min | | |
| 2018 | The Witch: Part 1. The Subversion | 마녀 | Park Hoon-jung | | |
| 2019 | Mal-Mo-E: The Secret Mission | 말모이 | Eom Yu-na | | |
| 2019 | Parasite | 기생충 | Bong Joon-ho | | |
| 2019 | Extreme Job | 극한직업 | Lee Byeong-heon | | |
| 2019 | Exit | 엑시트 | Lee Sang-geun | | |
| 2020 | Secret Zoo | 해치지않아 | Son Jae-gon | | |
| 2020 | The Man Standing Next | 남산의 | Woo Min-ho | | |
| 2020 | Peninsula | 반도 | Yeon Sang-ho | | |
| 2021 | Night in Paradise | 낙원의 밤 | Park Hoon-jung | | |
| 2022 | The Witch: Part 2. The Other One | 마녀 2: the other one | Park Hoon-jung | | |
| 2022 | Decision to Leave | 헤어질 결심 | Park Chan-wook | | |
| 2023 | The Childe | 귀공자 | Park Hoon-jung | | |
| 2023 | Jung_E | 정이 | Yeon Sang-ho | | |
| 2023 | Smugglers | 밀수 | Ryoo Seung-wan | | |
| 2024 | I, the Executioner | 베테랑2 | Ryoo Seung-wan | | |
| 2024 | Uprising | 전,란 | Kim Sang-man | | |
| 2024 | 12.12: The Day | 서울의 봄 | Kim Sung-su | | |
| 2024 | Kill Boksoon | 길복순 | Byun Sung-hyun | | |
| 2024 | Exhuma | 파묘 | Jang Jae-hyun | | |
| 2025 | Dark Nuns | 검은 수녀들 | Kwon Hyeok-jae | | |
| 2025 | Omniscient Reader: The Prophecy | 전지적 독자 시점 | Kim Byung-woo | | |
| 2025 | My Daughter Is a Zombie | 좀비딸 | Pil Gam-sung | | |
| 2025 | Yadang: The Snitch | 야당 | Hwang Byeong-guk | | |
| 2025 | Boss | 보스 | Ra Hee-chan | | |
| 2025 | No Other Choice | 어쩔수가없다 | Park Chan-wook | | |
| TBA | Tristes Tropiques | 슬픈 열대 | Park Hoon-jung | | |

=== Series ===
Series credit
| Year | Title | | Director | Ref. |
| Year | English | Korean | Director | Ref. |
|---|---|---|---|---|
| 2019–2020 | Kingdom | 킹덤 | Kim Seong-hun (Season 1); Park In-je (Season 2) | |
| 2020–2023 | Sweet Home | 스위트홈 | Lee Eung-bok; Jang Young-woo (season 1); Park So-hyun | |
| 2021 | The Silent Sea | 고요의 바다 | Choi Hang-yong | |
| 2021 | Hellbound Season 1 | 지옥 | Yeon Sang-ho | |
| 2021 | Dr. Brain | Dr. 브레인 | Kim Jee-woon | |
| 2022 | Connect | 커넥트 | Takashi Miike | |
| 2024 | Hellbound Season 2 | 지옥 | Yeon Sang-ho | |
| 2024 | The Tyrant | 폭군 | Park Hoon-jung | |
| 2024 | When the Stars Gossip | 별들에게 물어봐 | Park Shin-woo | |
| 2024 | Parasyte: The Grey | 기생수: 더 그레이 | Yeon Sang-ho | |
| 2025 | When Life Gives You Tangerines | 폭싹 속았수다 | Kim Won-seok | |
| 2025 | Karma | 악연 | Lee Il-hyung | |
| 2025 | Aema | 애마 | Lee Hae-young | |
| 2025 | Mercy for None | 광장 | Choi Sung-eun | |
| 2025 | Tempest | 북극성 | Kim Hee-won | |

== Accolades ==
Name of the award ceremony, year presented, category, nominee of the award, and the result of the nomination
| Award ceremony | Date of ceremony | Category | Nominee / Work | Result | Ref. |
|---|---|---|---|---|---|
| Baeksang Arts Awards | May 3, 2017 | Technical Award | Hwang Ho-kyun (SFX makeup) | Nominated | |
| Blue Dragon Film Awards | November 25, 2016 | Technical Award | Kwak Tae-yong & Hwang Hyo-gyun(Special makeup); Train to Busan | Won | |
| Chunsa Film Art Awards | May 24, 2017 | Technical Award | Kwak Tae-yong & Hwang Hyo-gyun(Special makeup); Train to Busan | Won | |
| Filmmakers' Night: Thank You, Korean Cinema! (Note: Event held in conjunction with 17th Busan International Film Festival) | October 8, 2012 | Gratitude Award from Audi Korea - Domestic Category | Cell | Won | |
| Grand Bell Awards | 2013 | Special Award for Advanced Technology | Kwak Tae-yong (special makeup); The Face Reader | Nominated | |
| Grand Bell Awards | 2016 | Special Award for Advanced Technology | Jo Yong-suk, Hwang Hyo-kyun, Kwak Tae-yong and Kim Tae-eui; The Tiger: An Old Hunter's Tale | Won | |
| Korean Association of Film Critics Awards | November 24, 2016 | Technical Award | Train to Busan | Won | |
