= Hwang Hyo-gyun =

South Korean make-up artist (born 1976)

- Born: March 26, 1976 (age 50); South Korea
- Education: Pusan National University (Bachelor of Fine Arts)
- Occupation: Make-up artist
- Years active: 2003–present
- Employer: Technical Art Studio Cell

Korean name
- Hangul: 황효균
- RR: Hwang Hyogyun
- MR: Hwang Hyogyun

Hwang Hyo-gyun (Korean: 황효균) is a South Korean film make-up artist. Since 2003, he is a co-CEO of Technical Art Studio Cell. The studio worked in films directed by South Korean auteurs such as Parasite, Extreme Job, Along with the Gods, and The Witch.

== Education ==
Hwang Hyo-gyun was born on March 26, 1976.

He was an undergraduate art major who loves film. Watching films such as Tell Me Something (1999) and Joint Security Area / JSA (2000) inspired him to choose career as a special effects makeup artist.

== Career ==
Hwang and Kwak Tae-yong established Technical Art Studio Cell on June 25, 2003. They chose the name "Cell," referencing the basic unit of biology and likening it to the smallest energy unit in a battery. The name reflects their belief that, as a base unit, they play a fundamental role in production. Hwang explained that he and Kwak have different areas of expertise. He is an expert in the artistic job, such as prosthetic make-up, while Kwak is an expert in the engineering part of the job.

== Filmography ==
=== Film ===
Key
†	Denotes films that have not yet been released

Film credits of Hwang
Year	Title		Director	Note	Ref.
Year	English	Korean	Director	Note	Ref.
2004	Three... Extremes: Cut	쓰리, 몬스터 - '컷'	Park Chan-wook	Short film, debut work	
2005	A Bittersweet Life	달콤한 인생	Kim Jee-woon		
2005	Antarctic Journal	남극일기	Yim Pil-sung		
2005	Lady Vengeance	친절한 금자씨	Park Chan-wook		
2005	Boy Goes to Heaven	소년, 천국에 가다	Yoon Tae-yong		
2006	The Host	괴물	Bong Joon Ho		
2007	The Cut	해부학교실	Son Tae-woong		
2008	The Good, the Bad, the Weird	좋은 놈, 나쁜 놈, 이상한 놈	Kim Jee-woon		
2009	Thirst	박쥐	Park Chan-wook		
2009	Mother	마더	Bong Joon Ho		
2010	I Saw the Devil	악마를 보았다	Kim Jee-woon		
2012	Howling	하울링	Yoo Ha		
2012	Deranged	연가시	Park Jung-woo		
2012	The Thieves	도둑들	Choi Dong-hoon		
2012	Masquerade	광해: 왕이 된 남자	Choo Chang-min		
2012	A Werewolf Boy	늑대소년	Jo Sung-hee		
2012	Doomsday Book	인류멸망보고서	Kim Jee-woon; Yim Pil-sung		
2013	The Face Reader	관상	Han Jae-rim		
2013	Mr. Go	미스터 고	Kim Yong-hwa		
2015	The Tiger	대호	Park Hoon-jung		
2015	The Himalaya	히말라야	Lee Seok-hoon		
2016	Train to Busan	부산행	Yeon Sang-ho		
2017	Okja	옥자	Bong Joon-ho		
2018	Along with the Gods: The Two Worlds	신과함께: 죄와 벌	Kim Yong-hwa		
2019	Parasite	기생충	Bong Joon-ho		
2019	Extreme Job	극한직업	Lee Byeong-heon		
2021	Night in Paradise	낙원의 밤	Park Hoon-jung		
2022	The Witch: Part 2. The Other One	마녀 2: the other one	Park Hoon-jung		
2022	Decision to Leave	헤어질 결심	Park Chan-wook		
2023	The Childe	귀공자	Park Hoon-jung		
2023	Jung_E	정이	Yeon Sang-ho	Netflix Film	
2023	Smugglers	밀수	Ryoo Seung-wan		
2024	I, the Executioner	베테랑2	Ryoo Seung-wan		
2024	Uprising	전,란	Kim Sang-man		
2024	12.12: The Day	서울의 봄	Kim Sung-su		
2024	Kill Boksoon	길복순	Byun Sung-hyun	Netflix film	
2024	Exhuma	파묘	Jang Jae-hyun		
2025	Dark Nuns	검은 수녀들	Kwon Hyeok-jae		
2025	Omniscient Reader: The Prophecy	전지적 독자 시점	Kim Byung-woo		
2025	My Daughter Is a Zombie	좀비딸	Pil Gam-sung		
2025	Yadang: The Snitch	야당	Hwang Byeong-guk		
2025	Boss	보스	Ra Hee-chan		
2025	No Other Choice	어쩔수가없다	Park Chan-wook		
2025	Mantis	사마귀	Byun Sung-hyun	Netflix film	
TBA	Tristes Tropiques †	슬픈 열대	Park Hoon-jung		

=== Series ===
Series credits of Hwang
Year	Title		Director	Ref.
Year	English	Korean	Director	Ref.
2019–2020	Kingdom	킹덤	Kim Seong-hun (Season 1); Park In-je (Season 2)	
2020–2023	Sweet Home	스위트홈	Lee Eung-bok; Jang Young-woo (season 1); Park So-hyun	
2021	The Silent Sea	고요의 바다	Choi Hang-yong	
2021	Hellbound Season 1	지옥	Yeon Sang-ho	
2021	Dr. Brain	Dr. 브레인	Kim Jee-woon	
2022	Connect	커넥트	Takashi Miike	
2024	Hellbound Season 2	지옥	Yeon Sang-ho	
2024	The Tyrant	폭군	Park Hoon-jung	
2024	When the Stars Gossip	별들에게 물어봐	Park Shin-woo	
2024	Parasyte: The Grey	기생수: 더 그레이	Yeon Sang-ho	
2025	When Life Gives You Tangerines	폭싹 속았수다	Kim Won-seok	
2025	Karma	악연	Lee Il-hyung	
2025	Aema	애마	Lee Hae-young	
2025	Mercy for None	광장	Choi Sung-eun	
2025	Tempest	북극성	Kim Hee-won	

== Accolades ==
Awards and nominations received by Hwang
Award ceremony	Year	Category	Nominee / Work	Result	Ref.
Baeksang Arts Awards	2024	Technical Award	12.12: The Day	Nominated	
Blue Dragon Film Awards	2016	Technical Award	Train to Busan (Note: Hwang Hyo-gyun and Kwak Tae-yong)	Won	
Chunsa Film Art Awards	2017	Technical Award	Train to Busan	Won	
Filmmakers' Night: Thank You, Korean Cinema! (Note: Event held in conjunction with 17th Busan International Film Festival)	2012	Gratitude Award from Audi Korea (Domestic Category)	Technical Art Studio Cell	Won	
Grand Bell Awards	2013	Special Award for Advanced Technology	The Face Reader	Nominated	
Grand Bell Awards	2016	Special Award for Advanced Technology	The Tiger: An Old Hunter's Tale (Note: Cho Yong-suk, Hwang Hyo-gyun, Kwak Tae-yong and Kim Tae-eui)	Won	
Korean Association of Film Critics Awards	2016	Technical Award	Train to Busan	Won	

== See also ==
- Prosthetic make-up effects
