= Park Moo-taek =

Korean alpinist (1969–2004)

- 박무택
- Born: June 22, 1969; Andong, North Gyeongsang Province, South Korea
- Died: May 20, 2004 (aged 34); Mount Everest
- Cause of death: High altitude, exposure, exhaustion
- Body discovered: 2005
- Resting place: 8,600m, Mount Everest
- Education: Keimyung University
- Known for: Former Guinness World Record holder, fastest man to climb the world's three highest mountains with supplementary oxygen in 1 year 362 days,
- Children: 1, Min-i

Park Moo-taek (Korean: 박무택; June 22, 1969 – May 20, 2004), also spelled Park Mu-taek, Park Muh-taek, was a South Korean mountaineer. Park Moo-taek summited eight-thousanders five times, and died after his second successful summit of Mount Everest. During his lifetime, he held the Guinness World Record for being the fastest man to climb the world's three highest mountains with supplementary oxygen. Park Moo-taek climbed Kangchenjunga on 19 May 2000, K2 on 31 July 2000 and Everest on 16 May 2002, completing the feat in 1 year 362 days. In 2022, the record was broken by Nirmal Purja.

== Background ==
Park Moo-taek was a protégé of Um Hong-gil, one of Korea's most notable climbers. The two climbed multiple peaks together, including Kanchenjunga and K2 in 2000, Shishapangma in 2001, and Everest in 2002.

As a chemistry student at Keimyung University, Park Moo-taek joined the student Mountaineering Club, known for producing some of Korea's most successful climbers. As a student, Park Moo-Taek gained experience climbing each weekend and vacation, spending nearly 130 days a year in the mountains.

=== Keimyung University Everest Expedition ===
To commemorate the 50th anniversary of Keimyung University, current students, alumni, and faculty members formed an expedition to climb Everest. Park Moo-taek, a 1987 alumnus joined as a member of 2004 the Keimyung University Everest Expedition.

The expedition ran into difficulties after the summit. Park Moo-Taek and fellow expedition member Jang Min began to struggle shortly after descending from the summit. At the summit, Park Moo-Taek removed his goggles to take pictures, subsequently he began to experience snowblindness. According to the expedition report, Park Moo-Taek stopped his descent as he could not see. Jang Min tried to descend alone, but slowed after suffering from hypoxia. Upon hearing the news, the pair's expedition leader Baek Joon-Ho initiated a rescue, climbing from their high camp to save them. Baek Joon-Ho reached Park Moo-taek twelve hours later. After trying to escort the pair down, it was too late. Baek Joon-Ho, Jang Min and Park Moo-taek died shortly afterwards very close to the top of Mount Everest.

Park Moo-taek's body remained near the route at 8,750 m where it was visible to climbers heading to the summit.

=== 2005 Korean Chomlongma Human Expedition ===
In 2005, Moo-taek's climbing mentor, Um Hong-gil led the "2005 Korean Chomlongma Human Expedition" to Everest to bring the bodies of the three Koreans down from the summit. Only Park Moo-taek's body could be found. He was still clipped into the fixed rope he used to reach the summit. Poor weather prevented the team from bringing Park's body off the mountain. Um Hong-gil's team removed Park's body from the summit route, bringing it to 8,600m where they built a cairn over the body, covering it with stones.

In 2015, Park Moo-taek's story was featured in The Himalayas, a South Korean film is based on the life of South Korean climber Um Hong-gil. In the film, Park Moo-Taek was portrayed by Jung Woo.

== Climbs ==
- 1989: Himalchuli (only reached 6,250m due to expedition leader's death)
- 1994: Thalay Sagar (6,904 m)
- 1996: Gasherbrum II (8,068 m)
- 1997: Nanda Devi (7,432 m)
- 2000: Kangchenjunga (8,586m)
- 2001: Cholatse (6,423 m)
- 2002: Mount Everest (8,848 m)
- 2003: Lhotse (8,516m)
- 2004: Mount Everest (8,848 m)

Order of Sports Merit Maengho (2nd Class) ribbon

== Awards ==
- 2005: Order of Sport Merit, Maengho (Fierce Tiger)
