= Hwang Jung-min =

South Korean actor (born 1970)

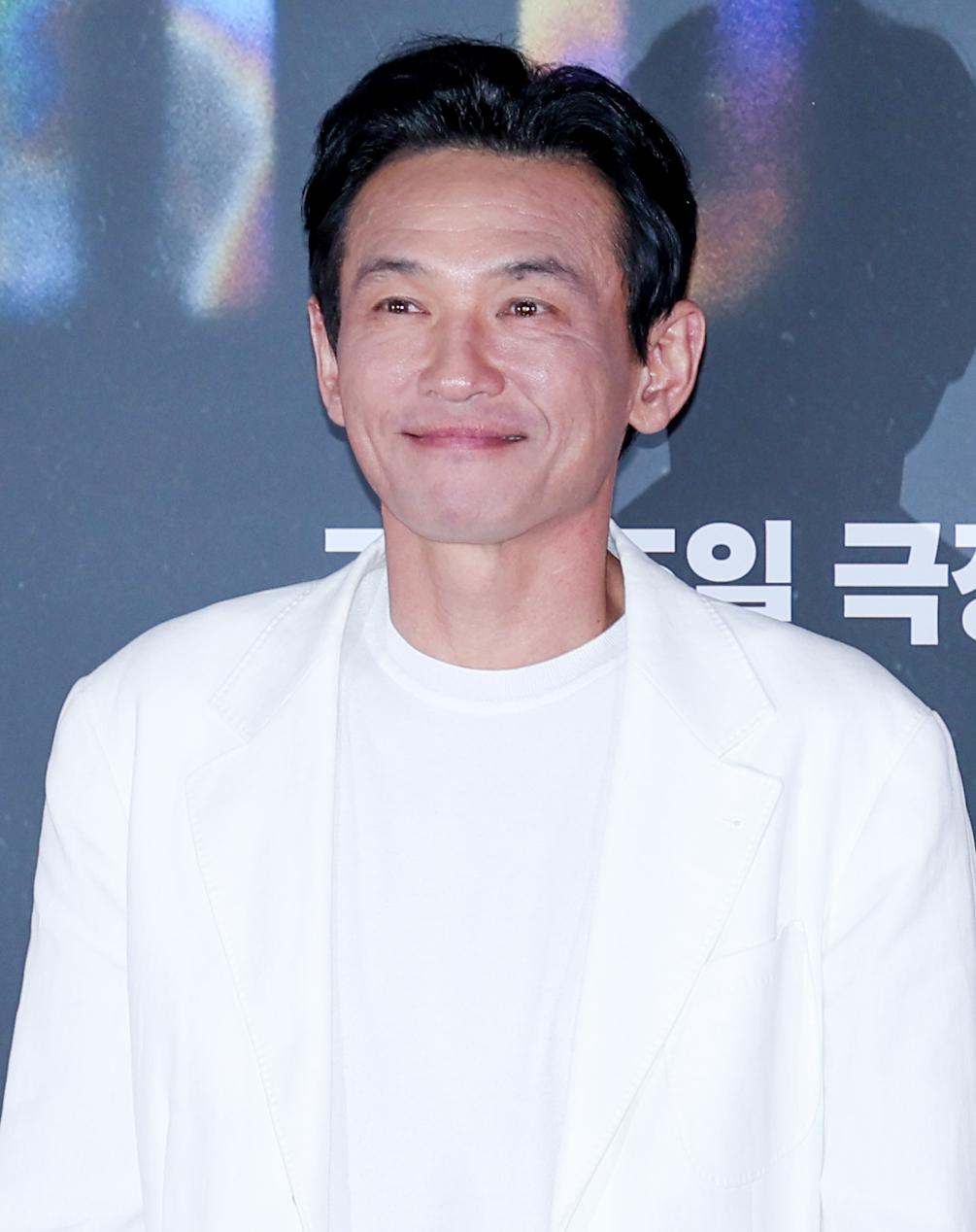
- Hwang in July 2026
- Born: September 1, 1970 (age 56); Masan, South Gyeongsang Province, South Korea
- Education: Seoul Institute of the Arts – Theater
- Years active: 1994–present
- Agent: SEM Company
- Height: 182 cm (6 ft 0 in)
- Spouse: Kim Mi-hye (m. 2004)
- Children: 2

Korean name
- Hangul: 황정민
- RR: Hwang Jeongmin
- MR: Hwang Chŏngmin

Hwang Jung-min (Korean: 황정민; born September 1, 1970) is a South Korean actor. One of the highest-grossing actors in South Korea, Hwang is the second actor to join the "100 Million Viewer Club" in Chungmuro. He began his career in musical theatre and first established himself as a leading man in the romantic drama You Are My Sunshine (2005).

Hwang has starred in numerous box office hits such as The Unjust (2010), Dancing Queen (2012), New World (2013), Ode to My Father (2014), Veteran (2015), The Himalayas (2015), A Violent Prosecutor (2016), The Wailing (2016), The Spy Gone North (2018), Deliver Us from Evil (2020), and 12.12: The Day (2023). His role in the latter earned him Best Actor at the 60th Baeksang Arts Awards.

== Career ==
=== 1995–2004: Beginnings and transition to films ===
Hwang Jung-min began his career in musical theatre, making his acting debut in Line 1 in 1995. He then starred in various musicals and plays in Daehangno such as Jesus Christ Superstar and Cats.

Despite a career on stage, Hwang had difficulty transitioning to film. He went through a long struggle for recognition, with people saying he "didn't have the right face for film." He even considered giving up his dream, but stuck to his conviction about walking the path of acting. Hwang said, "After becoming interested about the stage and how it feels to be that person on stage, I've never thought of anything else. That I never swayed -- that is one thing I can say with confidence."

His big break came when he was cast in Waikiki Brothers, a 2001 film that was a sleeper hit in Korea. In his role as a hopeless drummer, Hwang left a strong impression and earned favorable reviews, with director Yim Soon-rye calling him "an uncut gemstone". Hwang went on to have prominent roles in Road Movie, A Good Lawyer's Wife, Heaven's Soldiers and A Bittersweet Life.

=== 2005–2007: Mainstream breakthrough ===
But it was in 2005 that Hwang became a household name, portraying a naive farmer in love with an AIDS-stricken prostitute in the hit melodrama You Are My Sunshine. Hwang explains that he was "moved by the tale of the genuine love between two people. I agreed with the director's idea of showing it as pure love, like an uncut gem, without sloppily adding to it or embellishing it."

When he accepted the best actor award at the Blue Dragon Film Awards for his performance in You Are My Sunshine, many were moved by his now-famous speech: "All I did was add a spoon to a dinner table that had already been prepared by others."

He received further acclaim for his roles as an insurance investigator in Black House, a troubled club CEO who falls in love with a woman with a terminal illness in Happiness, a superhero in A Man Who Was Superman and a private detective in Private Eye.

Hwang has said that when choosing scripts, he looks at the overall storyline rather than the character itself. He then exerts effort to continuously bring out the character's inner workings. Hwang said, "It is very important that you don't get too absorbed in yourself. You must always remember that there is another person watching the scene. Maintaining objectivity is important." Hwang emphasizes sincerity and empathy in his acting. "The camera doesn't lie. You can never fool the viewer. You have to act with your heart, not your head." It is because of this commitment to emotional truth that Hwang can confidently tell interviewers that he is 100 percent satisfied with his work. During a crisis on set, or when he is either feeling too satisfied or caught up in mannerisms, he takes out notes he made when he first read the screenplay. He said, "I look at the screenplay again and again. That's where all the answers are."

=== 2008–2012: Return to theater, television series and directorial debut ===
He made a triumphant return to the stage in the 2008 production of Nine. The theater producer said that it took three years to cast the leading role because in Hwang he had found the right actor to rival Antonio Banderas' Broadway performance. He has since starred in University of Laughs, The Wedding Singer and Man of La Mancha. Hwang says, "A movie is the art of a director but the play is the art of an actor."

2009's The Accidental Couple was particularly special to Hwang, as it was his first time starring in a television drama in his 14-year acting career.

For his role as a blind swordsman in the 2010 period film Blades of Blood, Hwang went to schools for the blind to observe their movements. He then starred in The Unjust, a highly acclaimed noir about corruption in the South Korean justice system; followed by conspiracy film Moby Dick as a reporter.

Hwang then reunited with actress Uhm Jung-hwa (whom he previously starred with in 2005 ensemble romantic comedy All for Love) in the 2012 box office hit Dancing Queen. He returned to TV in the 2012 cable drama Korean Peninsula, but it was less successful.

In late 2012, Hwang made his debut as a theatre director in Stephen Sondheim's musical Assassins, which he also starred in.

=== 2013–2022: Prominence ===
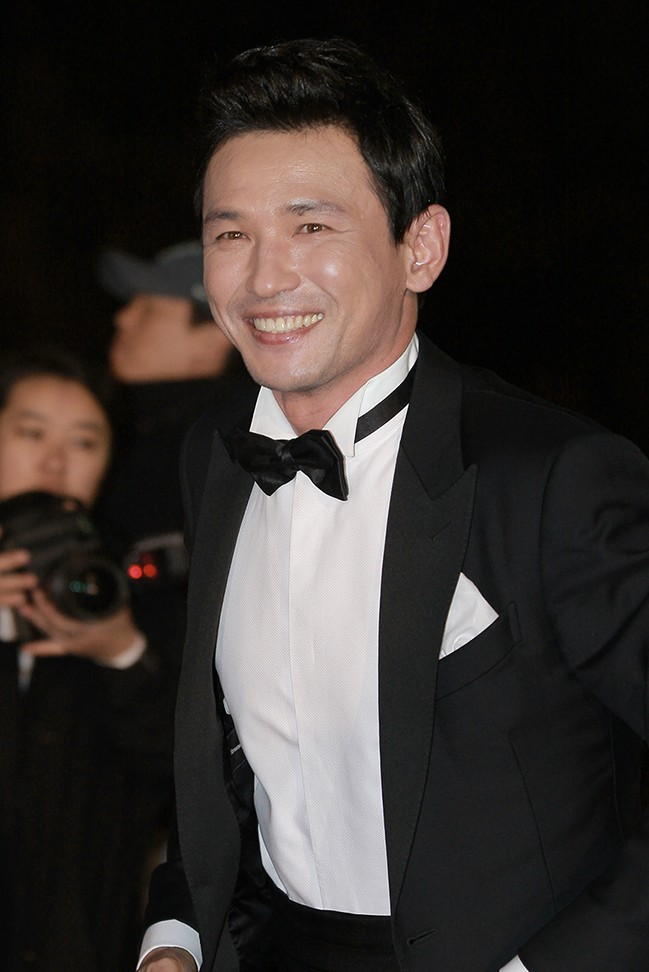
Hwang at the 34th Blue Dragon Film Awards in 2013

Hwang returned his focus to films, starring in noir film New World (2013), where his performance was singled out by The New York Times. He once again worked with Uhm Jung-hwa in the queer film In My End Is My Beginning (which was expanded from a short film in 2009's Five Senses of Eros). Hwang then played a middle-aged fighter in the sports film Fists of Legend, performing all the stunts himself.

In 2014, Hwang starred in romance drama Man in Love. He said that he chose to star in the film to support diversity in the Korean film industry, and because he wanted to show the human side of his character, a terminally ill gangster who falls in love for the first time.

Then later in the year, Hwang headlined Ode to My Father, embodying the South Korean everyman against the backdrop of recent Korean and world history since the 1950s. The film depicted the Hungnam evacuation during the Korean War, coalmining gastarbeiters in Germany in the 1960s, and the Vietnam War. Ode to My Father became the second highest-grossing film in the history of Korean cinema, with 14.2 million tickets sold.

He reunited with The Unjust director Ryoo Seung-wan in 2015 for Veteran, playing a hot-tempered police detective tracking an arrogant and heartless chaebol heir. The film was another smash hit, and is currently the 3rd all-time highest-grossing film in Korean cinema history. Hwang then starred in the budget mountaineering film The Himalayas, where he plays renowned Korean mountaineer Um Hong-gil, who became the first person to reach the 16 highest mountain peaks on Earth.

In 2016, he starred alongside Kang Dong-won in the crime comedy A Violent Prosecutor, which became the second highest-grossing film of 2016. This was followed by Na Hong-jin's critically acclaimed horror The Wailing, and noir film Asura: The City of Madness, which premiered at the 41st Toronto Film Festival. Hwang was named Gallup Korea's Films Actor of the Year for 2016.

Hwang then starred in the war film The Battleship Island alongside So Ji-sub and Song Joong-ki. The film marks his second collaboration with director Ryoo Seung-wan following Veteran.

In 2018, he starred in The Spy Gone North, a spy film directed by Yoon Jong-bin. It was another critical and commercial success for Hwang, grossing over $38 million worldwide and reaching its break-even point.

In 2020, Hwang starred in the action thriller Deliver Us from Evil, which became one of South Korea's major box-office successes of the year. He also appeared in the series Hush, marking his first television role in eight years. In 2021, he headlined the thriller Hostage: Missing Celebrity, in which he played a fictionalized version of himself. In 2022, Hwang appeared in the Netflix crime series Narco-Saints, portraying a South Korean drug lord.

=== 2023–present: 12.12: The Day and continued success ===
In 2023, he starred in the action drama The Point Men and the historical political thriller 12.12: The Day, portraying a coup leader and head of the Defense Security Command based on Chun Doo-hwan. The film became the highest grossing South Korean film of the year and earned Hwang numerous awards, including the Blue Dragon Film Awards and Baeksang Arts Awards for Best Actor. In 2024, Hwang appeared in the action comedy Mission: Cross and the action thriller I, the Executioner, the sequel to Veteran, marking his return as police detective Seo Do-cheol nine years later.

== Personal life ==
Hwang married musical theatre actress Kim Mi-hye on September 6, 2004. They have a son named Hwang Sae-hyun.

His younger brother is music director/composer Hwang Sang-jun.

On average, Hwang stars in three to four films a year. To critics who say that he does too many, Hwang responded, "I believe it is the responsibility of actors to try their best at acting when they come across screenplays that suit them. I breathe only when I act."

He enjoys playing musical instruments as a hobby. He learned to play the drums for his role in Waikiki Brothers. For The Battleship Island, he performed a clarinet scene himself using skills developed through his long-time hobby. He also played the clarinet for the OST of the drama Hush and has taken cello lessons.

== Filmography ==
=== Film ===
Year	Title	Role	Notes	Ref.
1990	The General's Son	Bar waiter	Bit part	
1999	Shiri	Special Investigation Team Agent	Bit part	
2001	Waikiki Brothers	Kang-soo		
2002	YMCA Baseball Team	Ryu Kwang-tae		
2002	Road Movie	Dae-shik		
2003	A Good Lawyer's Wife	Ju Yeong-jak		
2004	The Wolf Returns	Go Jeong-sik		
2005	This Charming Girl	Writer		
2005	A Bittersweet Life	Baek Dae-sik	Cameo	
2005	Heaven's Soldiers	Park Jung-woo		
2005	You Are My Sunshine	Seok-joong		
2005	All for Love	Na Do-chul		
2006	Bloody Tie	Do Jin-kwang		
2006	Over the Hedge	RJ (voice)	Korean dub	
2007	Black House	Jeon Joon-oh		
2007	Happiness	Young-su		
2007	Eleventh Mom	Baek-jung		
2008	A Man Who Was Superman	Lee Hyuk-suk		
2009	Private Eye	Hong Jin-ho		
2009	Five Senses of Eros	Min Jae-in	Segment: "In My End Is My Beginning"	
2010	Blades of Blood	Hwang Jeong-hak		
2010	The Unjust	Choi Cheol-gi		
2011	Battlefield Heroes	Kim Beob-min	Cameo	
2011	Moby Dick	Lee Bang-woo		
2012	Dancing Queen	Himself		
2013	New World	Jung Chung		
2013	In My End Is My Beginning	Min Jae-in		
2013	Fists of Legend	Im Deok-kyu		
2014	Man in Love	Han Tae-il		
2014	Ode to My Father	Yoon Deok-soo		
2015	Veteran	Seo Do-cheol		
2015	The Himalayas	Um Hong-gil		
2016	A Violent Prosecutor	Byun Jae-wook		
2016	The Wailing	Il-gwang		
2016	Asura: The City of Madness	Park Sung-bae		
2017	The Battleship Island	Lee Kang-ok		
2018	The Spy Gone North	Park Seok-young		
2019	Money	Orderer	Voice cameo	
2020	Deliver Us From Evil	Kim In-nam		
2021	Hostage: Missing Celebrity	Himself		
2022	Hunt	Lieutenant Lee	Cameo	
2023	The Point Men	Jung Jae-ho		
2023	Kill Boksoon	Shinichiro Oda / Kim Kwang-li	Cameo	
2023	12.12: The Day	Chun Doo-gwang		
2024	Mission: Cross	Park Kang-moo		
2024	I, the Executioner	Seo Do-cheol		
2026	Hope	Ko Beom-seok		

=== Television ===
Year	Title	Role	Notes	Ref.
2009	The Accidental Couple	Gu Dong-baek		
2012	Korean Peninsula	Seo Myung-joon		
2020	Hush	Han Joon Hyuk		
2022	Narco-Saints	Jeon Yo-hwan		
2025	Nine Puzzles	Oh Cheol-jin	Cameo	

=== Music video appearances ===
Year	Title	Artist	Ref.
2005	"On One's Way Back"	Na Eol	
2016	"What A Wonderful Cane"	Lee Dong-woo	
2021	"Thank U"	Yunho	
2021	"Nothing Special with the Day"	Im Chang-jung	

== Stage ==
=== Musical ===
Musical play performances
Year	Title		Role	Theater	Date	Ref.
Year	English	Korean	Role	Theater	Date	Ref.
1995	Subway Line 1	지하철 1호선	Cheolsu, Washboard, Little Bastard, Minister's Widow	Hakjeon Blue Theater Small Theater	May 2	
1995	Dog Poop	개똥이	wheel, earthworm	Seoul Arts Center Towol Theater	October 17 to November 5	
1996	Subway Line 1	(제20회) 서울연극제; 지하철 1호선	Cheolsu, Washboard, Little Bastard	Hakjeon Blue Theater Small Theater	September 10	
1997	Dog Poop	개똥이	wheel, earthworm	Cultural Center Grand Theater	March 29 to April 9	
1997	Jesus Christ Superstar	지저스 크라이스트 슈퍼스타	Simone, a member of the ensor	Sejong Center for the Performing Arts Auditorium	December 24 to 28	
1998	Blood Brothers	의형제	ugly, man 1, policeman 1, student	Pre-school Green Small Theater	September 1	
1999	Moskito	모스키토	Baek Ga-ri	Hakjeon Blue Theater Small Theater	May 1 to August 15	
1999	Cats	캣츠	Rum tum tuger			
2001	Tommy	토미	Tommy	Sejong Center for the Performing Arts	November 4 to 11	
2001	Line 1	지하철 1호선	Mundi, Kim Byeong-jang, ppallaepan, Office Worker, Minister's Widow	Hakjeon Blue Theater Small Theater	March 15 to 18	
2001	Line 1	지하철 1호선	Mundi, Kim Byeong-jang, ppallaepan, Office Worker, Minister's Widow	Hakjeon Blue Theater Small Theater	April 27 to June 17	
2004	42nd Street	브로드웨이 42번가	Billy Lorre	Popcorn House in Jeong-dong, Jung-gu, Seoul	May 15 to August 1	
2008	Nine	나인	Guido Contini	LG Arts Center	January 22	
2009–2010	The Wedding Singer	웨딩 싱어	Robby Heart	Chungmu Art Hall grand theater	November 27 to January 31	
2012	Man of La Mancha	맨 오브 라만차	Miguel de Cervantes; Don Quijote	Charlotte Theater	Juni 19 to December 31	
2012–2013	Assassins	어쌔신	Charlie Guiteau	Doosan Art Center Yeongang Hall	November 20 to February 3	
2015–2016	Okepi (Orchestra Pit)	오케피	Commander	LG Arts Center	December 18 to February 28	
2025	Mrs. Doubtfire	미세스 다웃파이어	Daniel / Doubtfire	Charlotte Theater	September 27 to December 7	
2026–2027	Mrs. Doubtfire	미세스 다웃파이어	Daniel / Doubtfire	GS Arts Center	December 3 to February 21	

=== Theater ===
Theater play performances
Year	Title		Role	Theater	Date	Ref.
Year	English	Korean	Role	Theater	Date	Ref.
1991	Hamlet	햄릿	Ozrik			
1993	Rhinoceros	코뿔소	Waitress	Batangol Small Theater	January 30 to March 3	
1993	Birthday Party	생일파티	Stage Director	Dongsung Art Center Small Theater	August 8 to September 5	
1993	Male Impulse	남자충동	Mr. Park	Cultural Center grand theater	October 3 to 8	
1993	Male Impulse	남자충동	Mr. Park	Hoam Art Hall	October 10 to November 2	
2008–2009	University of Laughs	웃음의 대학	Writer	Dongsung Art Center Dongsung Hall	October 24 to November 30	
2018	Richard III	리처드 3세	Richard III	Seoul Arts Centre CJ Towol Theatre	February 6 to March 4	
2019	Oedipus	오이디푸스	Oedipus	Seoul Arts Centre CJ Towol Theatre	January 29 to February 24	
2019	Oedipus	오이디푸스	Oedipus	Moakdang, Korea Sound Culture Center, Jeonju	March 8 to 9	
2019	Oedipus	오이디푸스	Oedipus	Guri Art Hall Cosmos Grand Theater	March 22 to 23	
2019	Oedipus	오이디푸스	Oedipus	GS Caltex Yeulmaru Grand Theater, Yeosu	March 29 to 31	
2019	Oedipus	오이디푸스	Oedipus	Ulsan Culture and Arts Center Main Performance Hall	April 5 to 6	
2021–2022	Richard III	리처드 3세	Richard III	Seoul Arts Centre CJ Towol Theatre	January 11 to February 13	
2024	Macbeth	맥베스	Macbeth	National Theater's Haeoreum Theater	July 13 to August 18	

== Discography ==
Song name	Year	Album name	Notes
"너는 내 운명 Sun Together" You are my destiny (Sun Together)	2005	You Are My Sunshine OST	by Hwang Jung-min and Jeon Do-yeon
"A Honeyed Question"	2005	A Bittersweet Life OST	by Hwang Jung-min
"누구를 위한 삶인가" Who are you living for?	2006	Bloody Tie OST	by Leessang feat. Hwang Jung-min and Ryoo Seung-bum
"We"	2010	single	by Jang Dong-gun, Kim Seung-woo, Hwang Jung-min, Gong Hyung-jin, Ji Jin-hee, Lee Ha-na - Actors Choice
No regrets	2013	Legendary Fist Special OST	Jeong-min Hwang, Jun-sang Yoo, Do-hyeon Yoon
"Beyond the window, you'll vaguely remember the old days"	2015	Himalaya Special Remake	YB, Hwang Jeong-min

== Accolades ==
=== Awards and nominations ===
Name of the award ceremony, year presented, category, nominee of the award, and the result of the nomination
Award ceremony	Year	Category	Nominee / Work	Result	Ref.
Asian Film Awards	2024	Best Actor	12.12: The Day	Nominated	
Baeksang Arts Awards	2006	Best Actor – Film	You Are My Sunshine	Nominated	
Baeksang Arts Awards	2013	Best Actor – Film	New World	Nominated	
Baeksang Arts Awards	2016	Best Actor – Film	Veteran	Nominated	
Baeksang Arts Awards	2016	Grand Prize – Film	Veteran / The Himalayas / A Violent Prosecutor	Nominated	
Baeksang Arts Awards	2024	Best Actor – Film	12.12: The Day	Won	
Blue Dragon Film Awards	2002	Best New Actor	Road Movie	Won	
Blue Dragon Film Awards	2005	Best Actor	You Are My Sunshine	Won	
Blue Dragon Film Awards	2005	Best Couple Award	Hwang Jung-min (with Jeon Do-yeon); You Are My Sunshine	Won	
Blue Dragon Film Awards	2005	Best Supporting Actor	A Bittersweet Life	Nominated	
Blue Dragon Film Awards	2007	Popular Star Award	Happiness	Won	
Blue Dragon Film Awards	2007	Best Actor	Happiness	Nominated	
Blue Dragon Film Awards	2013	Best Actor	New World	Won	
Blue Dragon Film Awards	2015	Best Actor	Veteran	Nominated	
Blue Dragon Film Awards	2020	Best Actor	Deliver Us from Evil	Nominated	
Blue Dragon Film Awards	2024	Best Actor	12.12: The Day	Won	
Buil Film Awards	2013	Best Actor	New World	Won	
Buil Film Awards	2016	Best Actor	Veteran	Nominated	
Buil Film Awards	2016	Best Supporting Actor	The Wailing	Nominated	
Buil Film Awards	2018	Best Actor	The Spy Gone North	Nominated	
Buil Film Awards	2020	Best Actor	Deliver Us from Evil	Nominated	
Buil Film Awards	2024	Best Actor	12.12: The Day	Nominated	
Busan Film Critics Awards	2002	Best New Actor	Road Movie	Won	
Busan Film Critics Awards	2006	Best Actor	Bloody Tie	Won	
Chunsa Film Art Awards	2005	Best Actor	You Are My Sunshine	Nominated	
Chunsa Film Art Awards	2009	Best Actor	Private Eye	Nominated	
Chunsa Film Art Awards	2014	Best Actor	New World	Nominated	
Chunsa Film Art Awards	2015	Best Actor	Ode to My Father	Nominated	
Chunsa Film Art Awards	2017	Best Supporting Actor	The Wailing	Nominated	
Chunsa Film Art Awards	2022	Best Actor	Hostage: Missing Celebrity	Nominated	
Director's Cut Awards	2002	Best New Actor	Road Movie	Won	
Director's Cut Awards	2015	Best Actor	Ode to My Father	Won	
Director's Cut Awards	2023	Best Actor in a Series	Narco-Saints	Nominated	
Director's Cut Awards	2024	Best Actor in Film	12.12: The Day	Nominated	
Fantasia Festival	2011	Best Actor	Hwang Jung-min (with Ryoo Seung-bum); The Unjust	Won	
Golden Cinema Festival	2015	Grand Prize (Daesang)	Ode to My Father	Won	
Golden Cinematography Awards	2006	Best Actor	You Are My Sunshine	Won	
Golden Ticket Awards	2009	Korea's Top Film Star	Hwang Jung-min	Won	
Grand Bell Awards	2002	Best New Actor	Waikiki Brothers	Nominated	
Grand Bell Awards	2003	Best Actor	Road Movie	Nominated	
Grand Bell Awards	2005	Best Supporting Actor	A Bittersweet Life	Won	
Grand Bell Awards	2006	Best Actor	You Are My Sunshine	Nominated	
Grand Bell Awards	2008	Best Actor	Happiness	Nominated	
Grand Bell Awards	2012	Best Actor	Dancing Queen	Nominated	
Grand Bell Awards	2013	Best Actor	New World / Fists of Legend	Nominated	
Grand Bell Awards	2015	Best Actor	Ode to My Father	Won	
Grand Bell Awards	2016	Best Supporting Actor	The Wailing	Nominated	
Grand Bell Awards	2018	Best Actor	The Spy Gone North	Won	
Jecheon International Music & Film Festival	2015	Best Actor	Ode to My Father	Won	
KBS Drama Awards	2009	Excellence Award, Actor in a Miniseries	The Accidental Couple	Nominated	
KBS Drama Awards	2009	Top Excellence Award, Actor	The Accidental Couple	Nominated	
Korea Film Actor's Association Awards	2013	Top Star Award	New World	Won	
Korea Musical Awards (1995~2013)	2012	Best Actor	Man of La Mancha	Nominated	
Korea Musical Awards (2017~)	2026	Best Actor	Mrs. Doubtfire	Nominated	
Korean Association of Film Critics Awards	2002	Best New Actor	Road Movie	Won	
Korean Association of Film Critics Awards	2013	Best Actor	New World	Nominated	
Korean Association of Film Critics Awards	2015	Best Actor	Ode to My Father	Nominated	
Korean Film Awards	2002	Best Supporting Actor	Waikiki Brothers	Won	
Korean Film Awards	2003	Best Actor	Road Movie	Nominated	
Korean Film Awards	2003	Best New Actor	Road Movie	Nominated	
Korean Film Awards	2005	Best Actor	You Are My Sunshine	Won	
Korean Film Awards	2005	Best Supporting Actor	A Bittersweet Life	Won	
Korean Film Awards	2006	Best Actor	Bloody Tie	Nominated	
Korean Film Producers Association Awards	2015	Best Actor	Ode to My Father	Won	
Max Movie Awards	2006	Best Actor	You Are My Sunshine	Won	
Max Movie Awards	2014	Best Actor	New World	Nominated	
Max Movie Awards	2015	Best Actor	Ode to My Father	Nominated	
Max Movie Awards	2016	Best Actor	The Himalayas	Nominated	
Seoul Institute of the Arts Alumni Association	2019	Light of Life Award	Hwang Jung-min	Won	
Seoul Senior Citizen Movie Awards	2015	Movie Couple Award	Hwang Jung-min (with Yunjin Kim); Ode to My Father	Won	
The Musical Awards	2008	Best Actor	Nine	Nominated	
The Seoul Awards	2017	Best Actor in Film	The Battleship Island	Nominated	

=== State honors ===
Name of country, year given, and name of honor
Country	Ceremony	Year	Honor or Award	Ref.
South Korea	Korean Popular Culture and Arts Awards (Note: Honors are given at the Korean Popular Culture and Arts Awards, arranged by the Korea Creative Content Agency and hosted by the Ministry of Culture, Sports and Tourism. They are awarded to those who have contributed to the arts and South Korea's pop culture.)	2023	Presidential Commendation	
South Korea	45th Taxpayers' Day	2011	Presidential Commendation	

=== Listicles ===
Name of publisher, year listed, name of listicle, and placement
Publisher	Year	Listicle	Placement	Ref.
Forbes	2014	Korea Power Celebrity 40	25th	
Forbes	2016	Korea Power Celebrity 40	14th	
Gallup Korea	2005	Film Actor of the Year	4th	
Gallup Korea	2014	Film Actor of the Year	19th	
Gallup Korea	2015	Film Actor of the Year	3rd	
Gallup Korea	2016	Film Actor of the Year	1st	
Gallup Korea	2017	Film Actor of the Year	4th	
Gallup Korea	2018	Film Actor of the Year	8th	
Gallup Korea	2019	Film Actor of the Year	9th	
Gallup Korea	2020	Film Actor of the Year	4th	
Gallup Korea	2021	Film Actor of the Year	6th	
Gallup Korea	2022	Film Actor of the Year	5th (Note: Tied with Jung Woo-sung)	
Gallup Korea	2023	Film Actor of the Year	4th (Note: Tied with Lee Jung-jae)	
The Screen	2019	2009-2019 Top Box Office Powerhouse Actors in Korean Movies	2nd	
