= Hush (TV series) =

2020 South Korean television series

- Promotional poster
- Hangul: 허쉬
- RR: Heoswi
- MR: Hŏshwi
- Genre: Drama
- Created by: JTBC
- Based on: Silence Warning by Jung Jin-young
- Written by: Kim Jung-min
- Directed by: Choi Gyu-sik
- Starring: Hwang Jung-min; Im Yoon-ah
- Composers: Seo Seong-won; Cheong Seung-hyun
- Country of origin: South Korea
- Original language: Korean
- No. of episodes: 16

Production
- Executive producers: Song Min-sun; Park Seong-eun; Park Seong-hye; Hwang Jung-min; Lim Yoon-ah
- Producers: Min Woo-shik; Hwang Hye-jung; Kim Bo-reum; Jo Sung-hoon
- Running time: 70 minutes
- Production companies: KeyEast; JTBC Studios
- Budget: ₩11.7 billion

Original release
- Network: JTBC
- Release: December 11, 2020 – February 6, 2021

Hush (Korean: 허쉬; RR: Heoswi) is a South Korean television series starring Hwang Jung-min and Im Yoon-ah. Based on the 2018 novel Silence Warning by Jung Jin-young, it aired on JTBC from December 11, 2020 to February 6, 2021.

== Synopsis ==
Hush follows the mutual growth of a veteran reporter who's always holding a cue stick and a survival-mode intern who believes food is mightier than the pen, capturing the livelihood and daily grind of salaried journalists.

== Cast ==
=== Main ===
- Hwang Jung-min as Han Joon-hyuk
- Im Yoon-ah as Lee Ji-soo

=== Supporting ===
- Son Byong-ho as Na Sung-won
- Kim Jae-chul as Park Myung-hwan
- Yoo Sun as Yang Yoon-kyung
- Jung Joon-won as Choi Kyung-woo
- Lee Ji-hoon as Yoon Sang-gyu
- Kim Won-hae as Jung Se-joon
- Park Ho-san as Uhm Sung-han
- Lee Seung-joon as Kim Gi-ha
- Baek Joo-hee as Lee Jae-eun
- Choi Kang-soo as Jo Dong-wook
- Kyung Soo-jin as Oh Soo-yeon
- Im Sung-jae as Kang Joo-an
- Lee Ji-hyun as Madame Kang
- Lee Seung-woo as Hong Gyu-tae

== Production ==
The series marks Hwang Jung-min's small screen comeback after 8 years.

== Episodes ==
No.	Title	Directed by	Written by	Original release date	South Korea viewers (millions)
1	"Bap is Mightier Than Pen"	Choi Gyu-sik	Kim Jung-min	December 11, 2020	0.756
Title reference: Bap
2	"Gomtang Keep the Pot Boiling"	Choi Gyu-sik	Kim Jung-min	December 12, 2020	0.546
Title reference: Gomtang
3	"Farewell Soup"	Choi Gyu-sik	Kim Jung-min	December 18, 2020	0.650
4	"Life is Egg"	Choi Gyu-sik	Kim Jung-min	December 19, 2020	0.550
5	"Winner Winner Chicken Dinner"	Choi Gyu-sik	Kim Jung-min	December 25, 2020	N/A
6	"Half Seasoned, Half Fried"	Choi Gyu-sik	Kim Jung-min	December 26, 2020	N/A
7	"Birthday Soup for Whom"	Choi Gyu-sik	Kim Jung-min	January 8, 2021	N/A
8	"Do You Prefer Alcohol to Coffee?"	Choi Gyu-sik	Kim Jung-min	January 9, 2021	N/A
9	"Eel Climbs Against Mountain"	Choi Gyu-sik	Kim Jung-min	January 15, 2021	0.596
10	"Beef vs. Pork"	Choi Gyu-sik	Kim Jung-min	January 16, 2021	N/A
11	"3 Min..."	Choi Gyu-sik	Kim Jung-min	January 22, 2021	N/A
12	"Gimpap Is My Scholarship"	Choi Gyu-sik	Kim Jung-min	January 23, 2021	N/A
Title reference: Gimbap
13	"Jajangmyeon, Once Upon a Time in Korea"	Choi Gyu-sik	Kim Jung-min	January 29, 2021	N/A
Title reference: Jajangmyeon
14	"Newspaper Is Not Hangover Soup"	Choi Gyu-sik	Kim Jung-min	January 30, 2021	0.551
Title reference: Haejang-guk
15	"A Fish Never Closes Its Eyes"	Choi Gyu-sik	Kim Jung-min	February 5, 2021	N/A
16	"Kimchi"	Choi Gyu-sik	Kim Jung-min	February 6, 2021	N/A
Title reference: Kimchi

== Original soundtrack ==
Hush

Soundtrack album by Various artists
- Released: 2020
- Genre: Soundtrack
- Languages: Korean; English
- Labels: Dreamus; SM

=== Part 1 ===
Released on December 12, 2020
No.	Title	Lyrics	Music	Artist	Length
1.	"Say hello to me" (당신의 안녕)	Kim Yoon-joo	Kim Yoon-joo; deulrejang	Rooftop Moonlight	3:20

=== Part 2 ===
Released on December 13, 2020
No.	Title	Lyrics	Music	Artist	Length
1.	"Sunset" (노을)	Yoo Gi-hwan	Kwon Jin-won	Sunwoo Jung-a	3:32

=== Part 3 ===
Released on December 20, 2020
No.	Title	Lyrics	Music	Artist	Length
1.	"No Regret" (이대로 괜찮을까)	Yoon Sa-ra	Courtney Stahl; Johan Gustafssoon; Freddy Alexander; Sebastian Lundberg	O.WHEN	3:51

=== Part 4 ===
Released on January 23, 2021
No.	Title	Lyrics	Music	Artist	Length
1.	"Walk With You" (그대 한숨이 깊고 깊어도)	Park Kang-il; CLEF CREW	Park Kang-il; CLEF CREW	Lee Juck	3:54

== Viewership ==
Hush : South Korea viewers per episode (thousands)

Season	Episode number																Average
Season	1	2	3	4	5	6	7	8	9	10	11	12	13	14	15	16	Average
1	756	546	650	550	N/A	N/A	N/A	N/A	596	N/A	N/A	N/A	N/A	551	N/A	N/A	N/A

Source: Audience measurement performed nationwide by Nielsen Korea.

Average TV viewership ratings
Ep.	Original broadcast date	Average audience share (Nielsen Korea)	
Ep.	Original broadcast date	Nationwide	Seoul
1	December 11, 2020	3.384% (10th)	4.137% (4th)
2	December 12, 2020	2.574% (10th)	3.350% (6th)
3	December 18, 2020	2.915% (16th)	N/A
4	December 19, 2020	2.323% (15th)	N/A
5	December 25, 2020	3.162% (16th)	N/A
6	December 26, 2020	2.594% (14th)	N/A
7	January 8, 2021	2.682% (19th)	N/A
8	January 9, 2021	2.327% (18th)	3.006% (10th)
9	January 15, 2021	2.633% (15th)	3.085% (9th)
10	January 16, 2021	1.890% (21st)	N/A
11	January 22, 2021	2.208% (20th)	N/A
12	January 23, 2021	2.149% (20th)	2.740% (10th)
13	January 29, 2021	2.350% (18th)	N/A
14	January 30, 2021	2.139% (17th)	2.528% (10th)
15	February 5, 2021	2.221% (18th)	N/A
16	February 6, 2021	2.310% (13th)	2.996% (9th)
Average		2.491%	— (Note: Due to some unpublished ratings, the exact average rating is unknown.)
In the table above, the blue numbers represent the lowest ratings and the red numbers represent the highest ratings.; N/A denotes that the rating is not known.; This drama airs on a cable channel/pay TV which normally has a relatively smaller audience compared to free-to-air TV/public broadcasters (KBS, SBS, MBC and EBS).
