= Road Movie (2002 film) =

- Film poster
- Hangul: 로드무비
- RR: Rodeumubi
- MR: Rodŭmubi
- Directed by: Kim In-sik
- Written by: Kim In-sik
- Produced by: Cha Seung-jae
- Starring: Jung Chan; Hwang Jung-min; Seo Lin
- Cinematography: Kim Jae-ho
- Edited by: Lee Jae-woong
- Music by: Lee Han-na
- Distributed by: Big Blue Films
- Release date: October 18, 2002 (South Korea)
- Running time: 114 minutes
- Country: South Korea
- Language: Korean
- Box office: US$100,500

Road Movie (Korean: 로드무비) is a 2002 South Korean romantic drama film about a love triangle between a woman, a man who loves her, and a gay man who loves him. Living on the margins of society, they go on a road trip together.

== Cast ==
- Jung Chan as Suk-won
- Hwang Jung-min as Dae-shik
- Seo Lin as Il-joo
- Jung Hyung-gi as Min-seok
- Bang Eun-jin as Jung-in
- Kim Gi-cheon as Jo-si
