= Waikiki Brothers =

2001 film

- Waikiki Brothers film poster
- Hangul: 와이키키 브라더스
- RR: Waikiki beuradeoseu
- MR: Waik'ik'i pŭradŏsŭ
- Directed by: Yim Soon-rye
- Written by: Yim Soon-rye
- Produced by: Lee Eun; Shin Jae-myung
- Starring: Lee Eol; Hwang Jung-min; Park Won-sang
- Cinematography: Choi Gi-yeol
- Edited by: Kim Sang-bum
- Music by: Choi Sun-sik
- Release date: October 27, 2001 (South Korea)
- Running time: 109 minutes
- Country: South Korea
- Language: Korean

Waikiki Brothers (Korean: 와이키키 브라더스) is a 2001 South Korean film, set in the 1980s, about a group of high school friends who form a band. It was the opening film of the 2001 Jeonju International Film Festival.

== Plot ==
Waikiki Brothers is a band going nowhere. After another depressing gig, the saxophonist quits, leaving the three remaining members - lead singer and guitarist Sung-woo (Lee Eol), keyboardist Jung-seok (Park Won-sang), and drummer Kang-soo (Hwang Jung-min), to continue on the road. The band ends up at Sung-woo's hometown, Suanbo, which was a popular hot spring resort in the '80s. The main resort now is the Waikiki Hotel, and their gig at the hotel nightclub starts well, until Jung-seok and Kang-soo start to play out their worst vices. For Sung-woo, the calm center of the band, the return home is filled with reservations of disappointments and a lost love. He reunites with his old high school friends, the original Waikiki Brothers, and finds them far from happy. He runs into In-hee (Oh Ji-hye), his unrequited first love. Now widowed, she seems desperate to try their relationship again. Sung-woo also runs into his old music teacher, Byung-joo, and tries to help him get work. But the band is fired from the nightclub and Sung-woo is forced to perform in karaoke bars. And, then, tragedy strikes when his high school classmate Soo-chul dies in an accident.

== Cast ==
- Lee Eol - Sung-woo
  - Park Hae-il - young Sung-woo
- Hwang Jung-min - Kang-soo
- Park Won-sang - Jung-seok
- Oh Kwang-rok - Hyun-gu
- Oh Ji-hye - In-hee
  - Moon Hye-won - young In-hee
- Ryoo Seung-bum - Gi-tae
- Kim Jong-eon - young Soo-chul
- Jung Dae-yong - Min-soo
- Joo Jin-mo - man selling items at rest area
- Lee Dong-yong - Busan bum 1
- Lee Tae-ri - young In-ki - (credit as Lee Min-ho)
- Lee Bong-kyu - manager
- Han Ki-joong - Min-soo

== Critical reception ==
Cine21 film critic Shim Young-seop said, "You can see how much (director) Im feels attached to the world. Though the characters are deceived by reality, they cannot hate the world; they still love it. Small-budgeted but artistic films such as Waikiki Brothers, films that depict modern ordinary Koreans as they truly are, those are the best movies and the most authentically Korean."

In 2025, the film was selected by South Korean film director Kim Cho-hee for the section 'Our Little History, Please Take Care of Our Future!' at the 30th Busan International Film Festival, recognized as a work that had a profound influence on her creative journey.

== Adaptation ==
In 2004, it inspired a musical titled Go! Waikiki Brothers starring North Korean defector Kim Young-un, which also performed in Los Angeles in 2006.
