= Mission: Cross =

2024 film by Lee Myeong-hun

- Promotional poster
- Hangul: 크로스
- Lit.: Cross
- RR: Keuroseu
- MR: K'ŭrosŭ
- Directed by: Lee Myeong-hun
- Written by: Lee Myeong-hun
- Produced by: Han Jae-deok; Cha Jin-kyung; Hong Jung-in; Kim Hyung-seok
- Starring: Hwang Jung-min; Yum Jung-ah; Jeon Hye-jin
- Cinematography: Park Jung-hoon
- Edited by: Kim Sang-beom
- Music by: Hwang Sang-jun
- Production companies: Sanai Pictures; Plus M Entertainment; Obra Creative Inc.
- Distributed by: Plus M Entertainment; Netflix
- Release date: August 9, 2024
- Running time: 105 minutes
- Country: South Korean
- Language: Korean

Mission: Cross (Korean: 크로스) is a 2024 South Korean spy action comedy film directed and written by Lee Myeong-hun, and starring Hwang Jung-min, Yum Jung-ah, and Jeon Hye-jin. It follows the adventures of a former agent turned househusband, Park Kang-moo, who becomes entangled in a dangerous mission alongside his detective wife Kang Mi-seon, who remains unaware of his past. The film was released on Netflix on 9 August 2024.

== Plot ==
Police detective Mi-seon goes on regular drug busts with her police squad. Her househusband, Kang-moo, meets up with an ex-colleague of his, Hee-joo, about a missing colleague, Jung-san. A couple of police detectives witness their meeting, and mention to their boss that Kang-moo is having an affair. Mi-seon overhears them speak, and later also sees some photos of Kang-moo with Hee-joo.

In a flashback in Russia 6 years ago, it is revealed that South Korean defense personnel, including Kang-moo, attempt to prevent a ship from sailing because they think it's working with North Korea, but are shocked to discover that it is actually working with South Korea. Kang-moo is captured and tortured for a passcode, which he gives away to save his colleague, and is asked to leave the force.

In the present day, Mi-seon follows her husband sees him with Hee-joo in a hotel room. She takes out a taser to stun them, but her colleague pleads with her to take a look at the full picture before using violence. Mi-seon lifts fingerprints off a car that Hee-joo touched and determines her identity. She also places a location finder on her husband's phone to know his whereabouts. She learns from another police officer about the emblem of a traitorous South Korean army unit that looks like an "H".

Kang-moo disguises himself as a construction worker and breaks into the traitorous military unit's torture chamber to free Jung-san. When he is in the hospital and believes he is free from danger, he reveals the secret code to Kang-moo, which the traitors come to know due to a hidden camera. Jung-san suspects something is amiss and calls Kang-moo to warn him, but is killed. Kang-moo is injured when an army truck rams into his car.

Mi-seon goes to the safe house where her husband was, and sees someone stealing a USB stick. She takes it from him and copies its contents to her phone and sends it to her husband's phone, and then destroys the USB drive. She is tortured and reveals the file location. Meanwhile, Kang-moo frees himself and arrives to save his wife, and they flee by truck. Kang-moo confesses to his wife that he is a special agent, and together they enter the safe house and arm themselves with weapons.

Kang-moo and Mi-seon go to the traitorous military unit's headquarters and fight with the guards and reset the computer systems just before the funds are transferred. Hee-joo tries to escape by car, but is stopped by Mi-seon. The husband and wife take the briefcase with the loot and hand it over to the South Korean army.

Six months later in a safe house, Kang-moo and Mi-seon work together on a cocaine bust. The two interrogate a smuggler who claims to work for a pastor who looks like Kang-moo.

== Cast ==
- Hwang Jung-min as Park Kang-moo, a former agent turned househusband and Mi-seon's husband.
- Yum Jung-ah as Kang Mi-seon, an ace detective of Violent Crimes Division Team 1 at Seoul Police Station and Kang-moo's wife.
- Jeon Hye-jin as Jang Hee-joo, a current agent and junior of Kang-moo who looked for him for help.
- Jung Man-sik as Lee Sang-woong, Team leader of Violent Crimes Division Team 1 at Seoul Police Station.
- Kim Joo-hun as Kim Jung-san, an army intelligence major who was partners with Kang-moo, and Hee-joo's husband.
- Cha Rae-hyung as Heon-gi, a detective of Violent Crimes Division Team 1 at Seoul Police Station.
- Lee Ho-cheol as Dong-soo, a detective of Violent Crimes Division Team 1 at Seoul Police Station.
- Ok Ja-yeon as Baek Seon-woo, Jung-san's capable assistant.
- Kim Jun-han as Geum-seok

== Production ==
=== Casting ===
In July 2022, Hwang Jung-min and Yum Jung-ah were reported to star in lead roles. Hwang and Yum confirmed their involvements in the following month, with Jeon Hye-jin, Jeong Man-sik, Kim Chan-hyung, Kim Joo-hun, Cha Rae-hyung, and Lee Ho-chul added to the cast. Kim Jun-han was announced to have a cameo appearance later in the same month.

=== Filming ===
Principal photography began in Pyeongtaek, Gyeonggi Province on 24 July 2022. Filming spanned across four months, and wrapped on 13 November.

== Release ==
Mission: Cross was initially scheduled for release in February 2024, but the release date was postponed by the distributor Plus M Entertainment. The film was released on 9 August 2024.

== Reception ==
James Marsh of South China Morning Post gave the film 4/5 stars, describing the film as hilarious and packed with an endless stream of gags, while also featuring well-executed action and strong performances from the actresses. Kim Da-sol of The Korea Herald praised the film as a delightful action comedy that follows the familiar troupe of a couple with secret pasts, but is elevated by the weighty presence of the lead actors Hwang Jung-min and Yeom Jung-ah, who are capable to balance the comedic and action elements of the film.
