= See You After School =

- Theatrical poster
- Hangul: 방과후 옥상
- Hanja: 放課後 屋上
- RR: Banggwahu oksang
- MR: Panggwahu oksang
- Directed by: Lee Seok-hoon
- Written by: Lee Seok-hoon
- Produced by: Choi Hee-il
- Starring: Bong Tae-gyu; Kim Tae-hyun; Jung Yoon-jo
- Cinematography: Choi Jin-woong
- Edited by: Moon In-dae
- Music by: Kim Jin-han
- Production companies: K&Entertainment; Cineon Entertainment; CJ Entertainment
- Distributed by: Cinema Service
- Release date: March 16, 2006
- Running time: 103 minutes
- Country: South Korea
- Language: Korean
- Box office: US$4.4 million

See You After School (Korean: 방과후 옥상; RR: Banggwahu oksang; lit. 'Rooftop After School') is a 2006 South Korean comical melodrama about a typical loser's zero to hero conquest.

== Plot ==
Goong-dahl, a typical loser billed as the "unluckiest man alive" returned to the school after one year's intense training of reject student's treatments. Now he is up to the challenge of posing himself other than a typical loser. With the leads from his another old fellow mate he started with a new face by threatening and rescuing hot girl "Min-ah" from several oldies in the school. Everything went smoothly up to the plan until one of the bully is happened to be the schools notorious thug "Jae-koo" thus receiving invitation to a grand duel on the roof top after the school.

After the light of adventure shading with the price of upcoming fierce grand duel Goong-dahl along with his ally seeks alternatives to avoid the grand duel. But adding more wood to the fire all the plans back fired and cemented his legend thanks to bolstering myths spread by famous mouth flickers in the school.

Meanwhile, unknown to "Goong-dahl" group of thugs from outside also trying to hunt him mistakenly believing he is their arch enemy Jae-koo. Nevertheless, during the intermission Goong-dahl fallen in love with Min-ah and became the resurrection dragon of loser students' union in the school.

But after all the hard work done, he is survived by only two options before the duel. Either become a predator of fellow losers or the protector of fellow losers. What will be his ultimatum? Is once a loser forever a loser?

== Cast ==
- Bong Tae-gyu as Namgoong Dahl
- Kim Tae-hyun as Ma Yun-sung
- Jung Yoon-jo as Choi Min-ah
- Ha Seok-jin as Kang Jae-goo
- Jo Dal-hwan as Byung-goo
- Park Chul-min as homeroom teacher
- Im Hyun-sik as doctor
- Cho Soo-hyang as Child
- Chu Sang-mi as female doctor
- Son Byeong-wook as Tae-son
- Choi Eun-joo as Mae-soon
- Jeong Dae-hun as student on bus
- Lee Dal-hyeong as Park Ki-bong
- Noh Hyung-ok as Hong-soo
- Lee Je-hoon as Ahn-kyung
- Lee Ho-young as Chinese teacher
- Hong Gyung-yeon as Dal's mother
- Lee Moo-saeng as Joon Tae
