= Um Hong-gil =

South Korean mountaineer (born 1960)

- 엄홍길
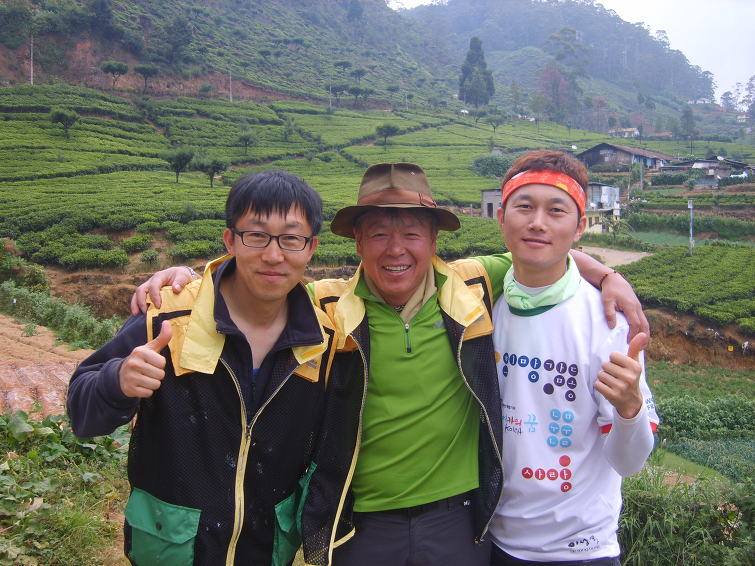
- Born: September 14, 1960 (age 66); Goseong County, South Gyeongsang
- Occupation: Mountaineer
- Known for: First person to climb 16 highest points on Earth
- Military career
- Branch: South Korea Navy
- Rank: Navy UDT / SEAL Staff Sergeant

Korean name
- Hangul: 엄홍길
- Hanja: 嚴弘吉
- RR: Eom Honggil
- MR: Ŏm Honggil
- Website: www.umhonggil.com

Um Hong-gil (Korean: 엄홍길; Hanja: 嚴弘吉; born September 14, 1960) is a South Korean mountaineer.

== Climbing career ==
He has led many South Korean summer expeditions to Mount Aconcagua in Argentina, where he has climbed South America's highest mountain several times.

In 2000, he climbed K2 (8,611m), which meant his team completed the mission to go up 14 peaks higher than 8,000 meters in altitude within 12 years. He tried to climb Mount Everest in September 2005, but failed. He tried again three years later and his attempt was successful. He also climbed Kangchenjunga.

Um Hong-gil has reached the summit of all 14 eight-thousand-meter peaks in the world and is the first person to climb the 16 highest points on Earth.

He was awarded the Himalayan Crown when he completed the 14 highest peaks in 2001. He is the first South Korean and the eleventh climber in the world to hold this distinction.

He led successful expeditions up Everest in 1988, 2002, and 2003. He has climbed both the North and South Sides of the Everest. Um Hong-gil has stood on top of Everest three times.

On December 13, 2007, he succeeded in reaching the summit of Vinson Massif, the highest peak of Antarctica.

The film 히말라야/The Himalayas was released on December 16, 2015. It was directed by Lee Seok-hoon and starred Hwang Jung-min in the role of Um. The film is based on Um's life, primarily focusing on his mentorship of two other climbers who later died during an ascent. The film beat the box office battle with Star Wars: The Force Awakens in South Korea, released on the same weekend.

== Charitable activities ==
Um Hong-gil invested his time with The Beautiful Foundation in his native South Korea. He helped start the program "Gil Sarang Fund" (Loving the Road) in order to support cultural activities for handicapped people. He received an honorary citizenship of Nepal for his philanthropy.

== Filmography ==
=== Television shows ===
Year	Title	Role	Notes	Ref.
2022–2023	Untangodo Village Hotel	Responsible for trekking	Season 1–2	

== Ambassadorship ==
- 7th Ulju Mountain Film Festival Ambassador (2022) with Park Gyuri

== See also ==
- List of climbers, alpinists and mountaineers
- List of Mount Everest summiters by number of times to the summit
