= Park Nam-ok =

Korean film director (1923–2017)

Park Nam-ok (Korean: 박남옥; February 24, 1923 – April 8, 2017) was a Korean film director. Park was considered to be the first Korean woman to direct a domestic film in her country. She is best known for her first film, The Widow (Mimang-in), released in March 1955. Park lived in the United States.

== Biography ==
As a young person, Park loved movies and was a fan of actor, Kim Shin-jae. Park attended the Ewha Women's Professional School starting 1943, but dropped out before graduation to work as a reporter in Daegu.

Park worked for the Chosun Film Company, starting in 1945 after Korea's liberation from Japan. She was introduced into the studios by the director, Yoon Yong-kyu, whom she knew through a friend. Park was involved as a scripter on the 1947 film, A New Oath, directed by Shin Kyeong-gyun. During the Korean War, she worked on a war film where she met her husband, Lee Bo-ra.

Park shot her film, The Widow, in the winter of 1954 and with her infant child carried on her back. She provided meals for her staff during the shooting of the film. The script was written by her husband, and her sister helped set up a production company, called "Sister Productions" for the film. The Widow, however did not attain commercial success and her directing career was over.

An award, given by the Seoul International Women's Film Festival, is named after her and the first time it was given out was in 2008 to Yim Soon-rye.

Park died on April 8, 2017, at the age of 94 of natural causes at her home in Los Angeles, California.
