= Mamasang: Remember me this way =

Documentary film from South Korea

- Directed by: Il-rhan Kim, Hye-young Cho
- Release date: 2005
- Running time: 65 mins
- Country: South Korea
- Languages: Korean, English

Mamasang: Remember me this way (Korean: 마마상) is a 2005 independent documentary film directed by Il-rhan Kim and Hye-young Cho. The film features Aunt Yang-hee, a biracial woman who works at a club in Songtan, a U.S. military base camptown near Pyeongtaek in South Korea. The film also documents an important demographic shift—the overwhelming majority of women working in camptown bars and clubs are no longer South Korean but foreign migrant women from the Philippines and Russia.

Relying on a series of intimate interviews to shed light on the lives of camptown women in Songtan, the film focuses primarily on Aunt Yang-hee, a 59 year-old woman who works as a "mamasang," a manager at a camptown club frequented by U.S soldiers stationed in South Korea. Also interviewed—anonymously with blurred faces or audio only—are a club owner and a migration labor broker as well as several migrant women who work in camptowns. The film takes place against the backdrop of escalating protests as anti-base and anti-war movements demand the withdrawal of U.S troops from South Korea as well as the withdrawal of South Korean troops from the U.S. coalition forces in the war in Iraq.

Mamasang was Il-rhan Kim's first documentary film and the start of her illustrious career as an award-winning feminist filmmaker and influential media activist. She is a founding member of the Seoul-based queer feminist media group, PINKS.

== Reception ==
The film was critically acclaimed for its sensitive, nuanced, and complex portrayal of camptown women. It screened at the Busan International Film Festival in 2005 as part of its Wide Angle Program and received the Women's News Award at the 7th Seoul International Women's Film Festival in 2005.

== See also ==
- Comfort women
- Korean war
- United States military and prostitution in South Korea
