= Yim Soon-rye =

South Korean director (born 1961)

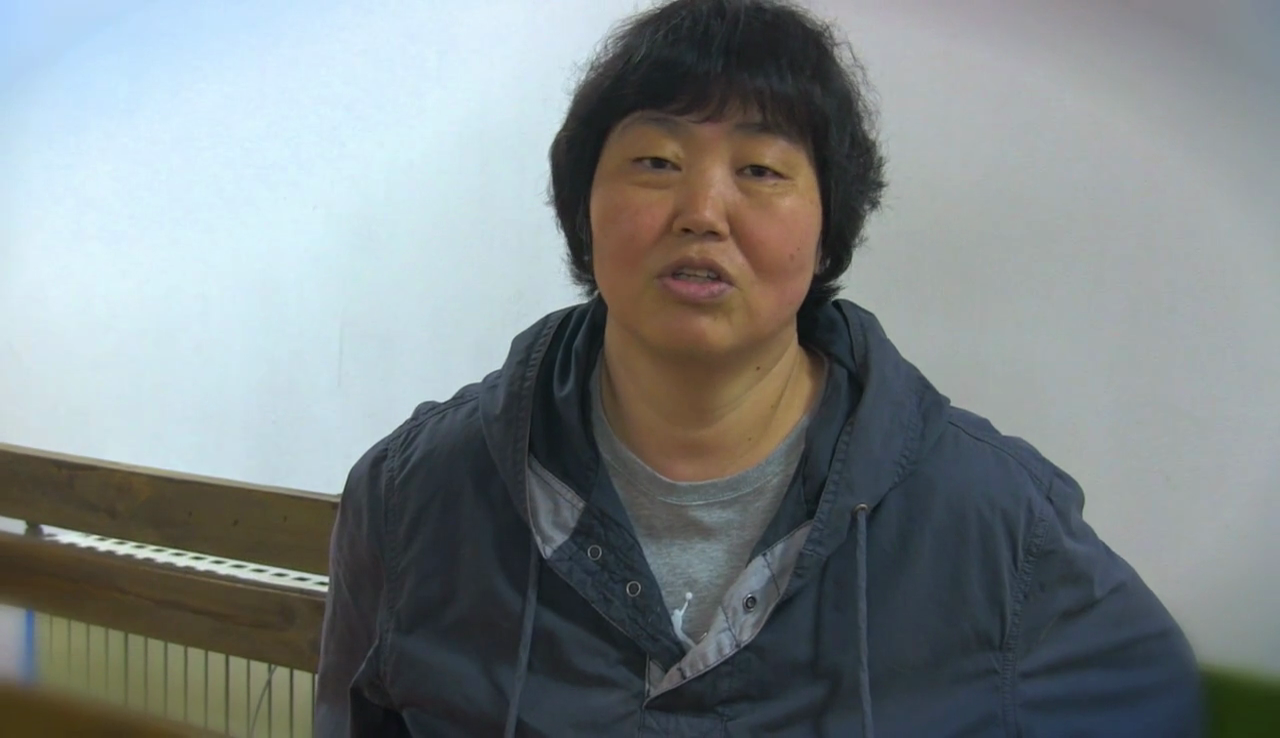
- Yim Soon-rye in 2014.
- Born: January 1, 1961 (age 65); Incheon, South Korea
- Other names: Im Soon-rye; Lim Soon-rye
- Education: Hanyang University; Paris 8 University
- Occupations: Film director, screenwriter, producer
- Years active: 1993–present

Korean name
- Hangul: 임순례
- Hanja: 林順禮
- RR: Im Sunrye
- MR: Im Sullye

Yim Soon-rye (Korean: 임순례; born January 1, 1961) is a South Korean film director and screenwriter. She is considered one of the few leading female auteurs of Korean New Wave cinema.

== Career ==
=== Education ===
Born in 1961 in Incheon, Yim Soon-rye graduated from Hanyang University in 1985 with a B.A. in English Literature and an M.A. in Theater and Film. She received her master's degree in Film Studies from Paris 8 University in 1992 with a thesis titled "Study on Kenji Mizoguchi".

Her films, including Three Friends (1996), Waikiki Brothers (2001), Forever the Moment (2008), Fly, Penguin (2009), South Bound (2013), Whistle Blower (2014) and Little Forest (2018), focus on ordinary people and social issues in contemporary South Korea. The main industry honors she has received include recognition from the Baeksang Arts Awards and the Blue Dragon Film Awards, as well as the Women in Film Korea Awards.

=== 1994–1996: Promenade in the Rain and Three Friends ===
Upon her return to Korea in 1993, she worked as an assistant director on Yeo Kyun-dong's Out to the World. In 1994, she directed her first short film Promenade in the Rain, which won the Grand Prize and the Press Award at the 1st Seoul International Short Film Festival.

She made her feature film debut with Three Friends (1996), which explored Korean masculinity and marginalization through the lives of three young men who have difficulty adjusting to the social system. It won the NETPAC Award at the 6th Pusan International Film Festival.

=== 2001: Waikiki Brothers and Keeping the Vision Alive ===
Her second feature was Waikiki Brothers in 2001, a bittersweet drama about a struggling nightclub band that wanders from one small town to another for a gig. It was the opening film of the 2nd Jeonju International Film Festival. Despite low ticket sales, Waikiki Brothers drew critical acclaim, with film critic Shim Young-seop praising Yim's use of long takes as a manifestation of the director's deep love for her characters. Yim won Best Screenplay at the 9th Chunsa Film Art Awards and Best Director at the 21st Korean Association of Film Critics Awards in 2001, while Waikiki Brothers won Best Film at the 38th Baeksang Arts Awards in 2002. And with its cult following, the film was later adapted into the stage musical Go! Waikiki Brothers! in 2004.

Yim's follow-up was the documentary Keeping the Vision Alive: Women in Korean Filmmaking (2001), an homage to both pioneers such as Park Nam-ok and Hwang Hye-mi, and contemporary directors like Byun Young-joo and Jang Hee-sun. Through images and interviews, Yim's camera unobtrusively let the women filmmakers discuss their experiences, struggles and survival in the male-dominated, conservative and sexist Korean film industry.

=== 2003: If You Were Me ===
In 2003, Yim was among six filmmakers who participated in If You Were Me, an omnibus funded by the National Human Rights Commission of Korea (NHRCK) that deals with different human rights issues. Yim's short film The Weight of Her is a satirical take on female beauty and body image, as a high school girl feels pressured to undergo plastic surgery in order to get hired.

Yim then produced A Smile, the feature directorial debut of fellow female Korean director Park Kyung-hee, and later made a cameo appearance in Park's short film Under a Big Tree. She also appeared in Ryoo Seung-wan's 2006 short film Hey Man (which skewers Korean machismo), and was among the subjects of Hiroko Yamazaki's 2007 documentary Viva! Women Directors.

=== 2008: Forever the Moment ===
Seven years after Waikiki Brothers, Yim directed her third feature film Forever the Moment, titled in Korean "The Best Moment of Our Lives". Based on the true story of the South Korean women's national handball team that won the silver medal at the 2004 Athens Olympics, Yim struck a balance between genre conventions and her own arthouse style by combining the dynamism and fast pacing of a mainstream sports film with character beats of the female athletes experiencing discrimination and job insecurity in their field and divorce, debt, and infertility in their personal lives. With over 4 million tickets sold in 2008, the sports drama became a sleeper hit and Yim's most commercially successful film yet.

Yim received the Park Nam-ok Award for outstanding achievement (named after Korea's first female filmmaker) from the 10th International Women's Film's Festival in Seoul, and won Woman Filmmaker of the Year at the 9th Women in Film Korea Awards. Forever the Moment won Best Film at the 44th Baeksang Arts Awards and the 29th Blue Dragon Film Awards.

=== 2009–2010: Fly, Penguin and Rolling Home with a Bull ===
In 2009, Yim again collaborated with the NHRCK with her fourth feature Fly, Penguin. The film is composed of four segments which tackle issues such as a mother's obsession with her son's English education, the ostracism at work of an office employee because he's a vegetarian and doesn't drink alcohol, the estrangement of a man from his family whom he financially supports overseas, and divorce between a couple in their sixties.

Her fifth film Rolling Home with a Bull (2010) was adapted from Kim Do-yeon's novel about a failed poet who goes on a road trip across rural Korea with a recently widowed ex-girlfriend and his father's cow that he plans on selling. Yim said, "Although the novel is based on a Buddhist pilgrimage, I thought it could be developed into an unconventional love story."

=== 2011: Sorry, Thanks ===
In 2011, Yim, an animal rights activist, produced the omnibus film Sorry, Thanks (also known as Thank You and I'm Sorry), in which four directors explored the relationship between humans and their pets. In Yim's short film Cat's Kiss, a father is at odds with his daughter because of her propensity for collecting stray cats, until he finds himself growing to care for them.

Later that year, she directed a Korean dubbed version of the 2002 Japanese film Oriume, which depicts a family's struggle to cope with an elderly relative who is afflicted with Alzheimer's disease.

In 2012, Yim executive produced Lee Kwang-kuk's debut film Romance Joe, and appeared in Heo Chul's documentary Ari Ari the Korean Cinema.

=== 2013: South Bound ===
Yim's next feature was South Bound (also known as Run to the South) in 2013. Adapted from Okuda Hideo's novel, the protagonist is a man with an outspoken nature and disdain for mainstream society who decides to relocate his family to a remote island off the south coast of Korea. But their dream of a happy and sustainable life free from governmental authority is ruined when they clash with a powerful politician who has plans of developing their island into a holiday resort.

The film received criticism from some quarters that opined it was overly politicized with its anti-establishment and anti-capitalist tone as well as its parallels to the Jeju Naval Base, but Yim said she "tried to deliver the story as joyfully as possible" with a light-hearted approach despite its weighty themes of individual freedom, national duty, and familial separation. She said further, "Our society is full of uncertainties and ferocious competition. "The South" here means an ideal land. Every one dreams of an ideal place, but only a few manage to fulfill their dream. The family in South Bound is willing to step ahead and achieve what they want by breaking away from social norms and traditions."

=== 2014: Whistle Blower ===
In 2014, Yim directed Whistle Blower, based on the real-life events surrounding Hwang Woo-suk, then a biotechnology professor at Seoul National University who gained international renown in 2004 after claiming that he had successfully carried out experiments cloning human embryonic stem cells. After a whistleblower anonymously tipped off a local investigative journalism program, it was revealed that Hwang's research had been fabricated and unethical, in one of the biggest scientific frauds in recent history.

In her fictionalized version, Yim said that one of the challenges was portraying the scientist as multidimensional, but that her focus was on the image of a journalist who rightfully battles for the truth, despite political pressure and public condemnation.

=== 2018: Little Forest ===
After a short hiatus, Yim directed Little Forest, in 2018. It was adapted from a manga series of the same name by Daisuke Igarashi. It was first published in 2002. Little Forest is a story of a young woman who returns to her childhood home, in a traditional Korean village, after leaving for the big city in pursuit of what turned out to be an elusive dream. When she gets home, her mother isn't there – but her mother's "Little Forest", the many ways in which a single mother successfully made a home for her much loved child, unfurl with a long succession of lovingly sketched details involving mostly food preparation.The unfurling moments are lightly but lovingly shared with two childhood friends, one of whom also abandoned their elusive dream of success in the big city (Seoul) and the other who is still pursuing the small-town equivalent of that elusive dream—without ever leaving home. In an interview with View of Korean Cinema, Yim said that she wanted to make Little Forest because it deviated from the mainstream Korean cinema that was over-saturated with very violent and big-budgeted films. She said, "I wanted to make a small film, a film which can heal and soothe the young generation of Korea, who is currently going through hard times.

== Style and themes ==
Yim Soon-rye is most known for making films that focus on South Korean society. Most notably, women empowerment and women in film. Yim, who is also an animal rights activist, has worked on films that focus on human relationships with animals. Yim creates films that have personal stories and narratives that deviate from the big-budget blockbusters of the Korean film industry. They are usually light-hearted and heart-warming. Yim tends to make films that are slower paced. She utilizes long dialogue takes, slow camera movement, slow cuts, and medium-close up shots.

== Personal life ==
Yim lives in a small town called Yangpyeong; a one-hour drive from central Seoul. She has been living there since 2005. She has one dog and wanted to give the dog a bigger space to run around. Yim is a nature lover and is more acquainted with the country-side lifestyle, despite working in the city.

== Filmography ==
- Promenade in the Rain (short film, 1994) – also screenwriter, producer
- Three Friends (1996) – also screenwriter, producer
- Waikiki Brothers (2001) – also screenwriter
- Keeping the Vision Alive: Women in Korean Filmmaking (documentary, 2001)
- "The Weight of Her" (short film in If You Were Me, 2003) – also screenwriter
- Forever the Moment (2008) – also script editor
- Fly, Penguin (2009) – also screenwriter
- Rolling Home with a Bull (2010) – also screenwriter
- "Cat's Kiss" (short film in Sorry, Thanks) – also screenwriter
- South Bound (2013)
- Whistle Blower (2014)
- Little Forest (2018)
- The Point Men (2023)
- Lee Jung-seob (upcoming)

Other work

- Out to the World (1993) – assistant director
- A Smile (2003) – producer
- "Under a Big Tree" (short film in Twentidentity, 2004) – cameo
- Hey Man (short film in If You Were Me 2, 2006) – cameo
- Viva! Women Directors (documentary, 2007) – as herself
- Sorry, Thanks (2011) – producer
- Oriume (2011) – director of Korean dubbed version
- Romance Joe (2012) – executive producer
- Ari Ari the Korean Cinema (documentary, 2012) – as herself
- One Way Trip (2015) – executive producer

== Awards ==
| Year | Award | Category | Recipient | Result | Ref. |
|---|---|---|---|---|---|
| 2001 | 9th Chunsa Film Art Awards | Best Screenplay | Waikiki Brothers | Won | |
| 2001 | 21st Korean Association of Film Critics Awards | Best Director | Waikiki Brothers | Won | |
| | 44th Baeksang Arts Awards | Best Film | Forever the Moment | Won | |
| | 44th Baeksang Arts Awards | Best Director (film) | Forever the Moment | Nominated | |
| | 29th Blue Dragon Film Awards | Best Film | Forever the Moment | Won | |
| | 29th Blue Dragon Film Awards | Best Director | Forever the Moment | Nominated | |
| 2008 | 17th Buil Film Awards | Best Supporting Actress | Forever the Moment | Nominated | |
| 2008 | 17th Buil Film Awards | Buil Readers' Jury Award | Forever the Moment | Nominated | |
| | 9th Busan Film Critics Awards | Special Jury Prize | Forever the Moment | Won | |
| 2008 | Seoul International Women's Film Festival | Park Namok Award | Forever the Moment | Won | |
| 2008 | Women in Film Korea Festival | Woman in Film of the Year | Forever the Moment | Won | |
| 2008 | Women in Film Korea Festival | PR and Marketing Award | Forever the Moment | Won | |
| 2008 | 10th International Women's Film's Festival in Seoul | Park Nam-ok Award | Yim Son-rye | Won | |
| 2008 | Korea Green Foundation | 100 People Who Light Up the World | Yim Son-rye | Won | |
| 2009 | 18th Buil Film Awards: | Yu Hyun-mok Film Arts Award | Yim Son-rye | Won | |
| 2018 | 38th Korean Association of Film Critics Awards | Top 11 Films | Little Forest | Won | |
| | 39th Blue Dragon Film Awards | Best Film | Little Forest | Nominated | |
| | 39th Blue Dragon Film Awards | Best Director | Little Forest | Nominated | |
| | 5th Korean Film Producers Association Awards | Best Director | Little Forest | Won | |
| | 24th Chunsa Film Art Awards | Best Director | Little Forest | Nominated | |
| 2023 | Buil Film Awards | Best Director | The Point Men | Nominated | |

=== Honours ===
- Jury president at the 2026 Singapore International Film Festival for its section 'Asian Feature Film Competition'.

== See also ==
- List of Korean film directors
- Cinema of Korea
