= The Himalayas (film) =

- Theatrical release poster
- Directed by: Lee Seok-hoon
- Screenplay by: Soo Oh; Min Ji-eun
- Story by: Lee Seok-hoon; Yoon Je-kyoon; Kang Dae-kyu; Lee Jong-suk; Park Soo-jin
- Produced by: Yoon Je-kyoon; Joo Seung-hwan
- Starring: Hwang Jung-min; Jung Woo; Jo Sung-ha; Kim In-kwon; Ra Mi-ran; Kim Won-hae; Lee Hae-young; Jeon Bae-soo
- Cinematography: Kim Tae-seong; Hong Seung-hyuk
- Edited by: Jin Lee
- Music by: Sang-Joon Hwang
- Production company: JK Film
- Distributed by: CJ Entertainment
- Release date: December 16, 2015 (South Korea)
- Running time: 124 minutes
- Country: South Korea
- Languages: Korean; English; Mandarin
- Box office: US$50.5 million

The Himalayas (Korean: 히말라야; RR: Himallaya) is a 2015 South Korean adventure drama film directed by Lee Seok-hoon. The film is based on Um Hong-gil's real life, primarily focusing on his mentorship of two other climbers who later died during an ascent.

== Plot ==
During a climb up Kangchenjunga, a mountaineer named Um Hong-gil (Hwang Jung-min) saves the life of Park Moo-taek (Jung Woo) and his friend Park Jeong-Bok (Kim In-kwon), in the aftermath he warned them never to climb mountains again. A few days later he and his crew got a project and he needs new members. One of his crew members introduced him to two young members who happen to be the ones he asked not to climb mountains. He refused to accept them but they would not give up, he had no choice but to say yes to their request to join in the crew's next adventure.

After climbing the first mountain Hong-gil and Moo-taek became close friends, climbing a few other mountains together until Hong-gil could no longer climb again because of his legs, stopping at step 14. Moo-taek was then made the head of a new team, which he trained using Hong-gil's techniques. On their mission Moo-taek died with one other climber, with his friend who went on a search for them having died crying beside him.

A few days before their anniversary, Hong-gil was asked during a lecture who in his opinion was the best mountain climber, to which he replied that it was Moo-taek's friend who could not let his friend die alone. Hong-gil then made a decision to search for the body of Moo-taek. Gathering his old crew, he set out to find his body, he found it but the body was heavier than he thought, so he and his crew put some stones on him and removed the chain on his neck containing a message for his wife. Hong-gil after this event climbed the level 16th mountain with his bad legs believing Moo-taek was his legs and the people who died with him were his lungs and heart.

Mountaineer Um Hong-gil and his expedition team go to the Himalayas to find the body of Park Moo-taek.

== Cast ==
- Hwang Jung-min as Um Hong-gil
- Jung Woo as Park Moo-taek
- Jo Sung-ha as Lee Dong-gyu
- Kim In-kwon as Park Jeong-bok
- Ra Mi-ran as Jo Myeong-ae
- Kim Won-hae as Kim Moo-yeong
- Lee Hae-young as Jang Cheol-goo
- Jeon Bae-soo as Jeon Bae-soo

== Reception ==
The film grossed US$8.55 million on the third weekend and US$2.5 million on the fourth weekend.

Justin Lowe of The Hollywood Reporter called the film "a tepidly paced adventure tale."

== Accolades ==
| Year | Award | Category | Recipient | Result |
|---|---|---|---|---|
| 2016 | 11th Max Movie Awards | Best Supporting Actress | Ra Mi-ran | Won |
| 2016 | 11th Max Movie Awards | Best Poster | The Himalayas | Won |
| 2016 | 36th Golden Cinematography Awards | Best Supporting Actor | Kim In-kwon | Won |
| 2016 | 52nd Baeksang Arts Awards | Best Supporting Actress | Ra Mi-ran | Won |
