= Lee Seok-hoon =

South Korean filmmaker (born 1972)

- Born: January 6, 1972 (age 54); South Korea
- Occupations: Film director, screenwriter

Korean name
- Hangul: 이석훈
- RR: I Seokhun
- MR: I Sŏkhun

Lee Seok-hoon (Korean: 이석훈; born January 6, 1972) is a South Korean film director and screenwriter. Lee began his directorial debut with the high school comedy See You After School (2006), followed by romantic comedy Two Faces of My Girlfriend (2007) - both films starring Bong Tae-gyu as the leading role. His romantic comedy Dancing Queen (2012) was a commercial success with over four million admissions and the period adventure film The Pirates (2014), starring Son Ye-jin and Kim Nam-gil, was also a hit with more than 8.6 million admissions at the end of its run.

== Filmography ==
- Saturday 2.00 pm (1998) - assistant director
- Zzang (1998) - directing dept
- White Valentine (1999) - directing dept
- For the Peace of All Mankind (short film, 1999) - director, screenwriter
- Super Glue (short film, 2001) - director, screenwriter, editor
- See You After School (2006) - director, screenwriter
- Two Faces of My Girlfriend (2007) - director
- Dancing Queen (2012) - director, screenwriter
- Rockin' on Heaven's Door (2013) - script editor
- The Pirates (2014) - director
- The Himalayas (2015) - director
- Confidential Assignment 2: International (2022) - director

== Awards ==
- 2014 22nd Korea Culture and Entertainment Awards: Best Director (The Pirates)
