= Kim Young-ho =

Kim Young-ho may refer to:

- Kim Young-ho (fencer) (born 1971), South Korean fencer
- Kim Young-ho (actor) (born 1967), South Korean actor and singer
- Kim Young-ho (cinematographer) (born 1970), South Korean cinematographer
