= Park Hoon-jung =

South Korean filmmaker (born 1975)

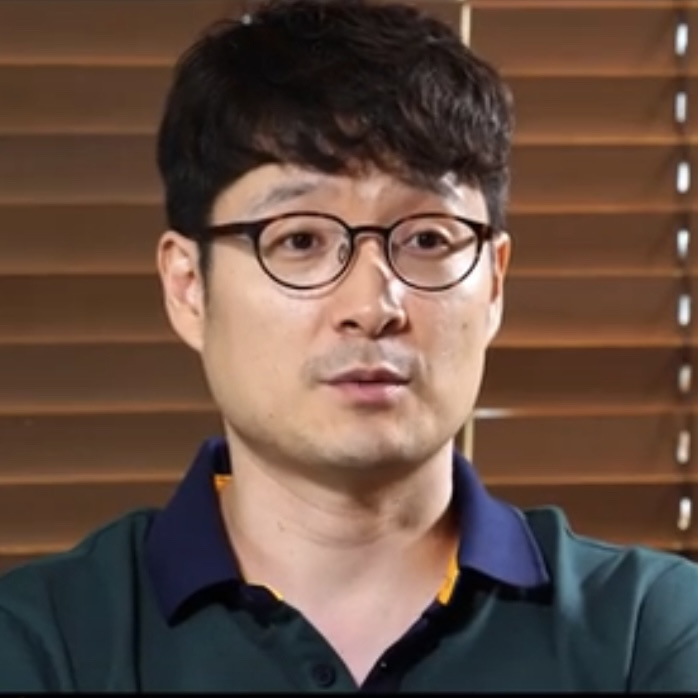
- Park Hoon-jung 2017
- Born: 1975 (age 50–51); South Korea
- Occupations: Film director; Screenwriter
- Years active: 2010–present
- Employer: Gold Moon
- Notable work: New World
- Spouse(s): married, undisclosed
- Children: 1

Korean name
- Hangul: 박훈정
- Hanja: 朴勳正
- RR: Bak Hunjeong
- MR: Pak Hunjŏng

Park Hoon-jung (Korean: 박훈정; born in 1975) is a South Korean film director and screenwriter. Park first gained recognition in the Korean film industry for his screenwriting, having written the screenplays for directors Kim Jee-woon's I Saw the Devil (2010) and Ryoo Seung-wan's The Unjust (2010). In 2011, he made his directorial debut with the period film The Showdown, and his second film, the gangster epic New World (2013), was a critical and commercial success.

== Early life ==
Born in 1975, Park's early interest in storytelling developed during childhood, attributed to his love of reading. Around ages six or seven, he had read fairy tales from Northern Europe and South America. By fourth grade, he had shifted to literature and martial arts novels. He later said that this transition had left him disillusioned after he realized that the happy endings portrayed in fairy tales did not reflect reality, which had contributed to his growing interest in film.

His interest in cinema deepened in 1991 during his second year of high school, after watching a science fiction movie at a local double-feature theater. While he can't remember the exact title, the film's plot, involving a scientist turned cyborg seeking revenge for stolen weapon blueprints, left a lasting impression. Park then systematically explored his neighborhood video rental store's collection, focusing on noir, gangster, and thriller genres. During a period of restricted cultural imports, he frequented Myeongdong's underground markets and traveled to cities like Busan and Daegu to acquire pirated Japanese animation and rare videotapes.

Park was influenced by his highschool teacher's skepticism regarding the value of higher education. Based on his academic performance, he enrolled in a natural science major and dropped out after completing his freshman year twice. Following his university departure, he applied to become a non-commissioned officer and served for five years, eventually receiving an honorable discharge with the rank of Sergeant.

== Career ==
=== Early career in game industry, comic, and transition to film screenwriting ===
Near the end of his military service, he won a game scenario contest organized by the Venture Association, which led to his recruitment by a gaming firm. When that company shifted its business model, he co-founded a game development venture with colleagues, though the enterprise was short-lived.

Having lacked formal training for screenwriting, he taught himself the craft by transcribing screenplays from other films. He spent time at Kino, a film library in Daehakro, and at a specialized film bookstore in Dongsung-dong, Seoul. There, he studied the Complete Collection of Korean Film Screenplays, published by the Korean Film Council, until he had memorized it word for word. He also read works on Eastern philosophy, becoming especially taken with Zhuangzi's On the Equality of Things. He then began writing his own scripts, later spending approximately a decade working as an uncredited screenwriter and adapting numerous scripts starting in 2000. To support himself, he wrote for comic books, citing more reliable payment schedules than those in the film industry. His career advanced after he won a 2006 synopsis contest hosted by Sidus HQ, a prominent film production company.

=== Breakthrough as a film screenwriter ===
"When Choi Min-shik first approached me with this project I was working on a different film, but it got delayed for a year and I thought I couldn't just rest and do nothing. I needed a script because it would have taken too long to develop something new from scratch. So I was in a bit of a dilemma when exactly at this moment Choi, who plays the serial killer in the film, came to me with this script, and suddenly everything fell into place.

When I first read the script it felt very new and powerful but at the same time it had a brutal and tough side to it, which got me interested..."

— Kim Jee-woon about the I Saw The Devil script

His professional breakthrough occurred in 2010 when he wrote the screenplays for Kim Jee-woon's film I Saw the Devil (2010) and Ryoo Seung-wan's film The Unjust (2010). The critical and commercial success of these films established him as a prominent figure in Chungmuro. Notably, I Saw the Devil was the first time Kim Jee-woon directed a film written by another screenwriter. Actor Choi Min-sik, who was seeking a new project following changes to the South Korean screen quota system, introduced Kim to the script.

After its South Korean premiere on August 12, 2010, the film garnered international acclaim at several major festivals, including the 2011 Sundance Film Festival, the Fantasporto Film Festival, Toronto International Film Festival, Sitges Film Festival, San Sebastian Film Festival and the London Korean Film Festival. The film also received favorable review from international movie critics. It received numerous accolades, including Best Director and Best Film at Fantasporto, Special Jury Prize, Audience Award, Critics Award at the Gerardmer Film Festival, Best Lighting at the Grand Bell Awards, Best Foreign Language film from the Austin Film Critics Association and Best Editing from the 2011 Asian Film Awards.

Similarly, The Unjust was the first film directed by Ryoo Seung-wan based on a screenplay he did not write himself. A dark critique of corruption within the Korean justice system, the film reunited lead actors Hwang Jung-min and Ryoo Seung-bum, who had previously worked together in Bloody Tie (2006). The Unjust enjoyed a prolific festival run, screening at the Panorama section of the 61st Berlin International Film Festival, the Hong Kong International Film Festival, the Shanghai International Film Festival, the New York Asian Film Festival, the Fantasia Festival, the Hawaii International Film Festival, the Vladivostok International Film Festival - Pacific Meridian, the Sitges Film Festival, the London Korean Film Festival, and the Far East Film Festival. The film was both a critical and commercial success, recording 2.7 million admissions and earning Park multiple awards for his screenplay.

=== Directorial debut and following breakthrough projects ===
Park made his directorial debut in 2011 with The Showdown. He had originally written the script in 2006 and offered it to various production companies, but found that prospective directors and studios sought to alter the narrative significantly. Feeling these changes compromised his vision, Park decided to helm the project himself. Produced on a modest budget of approximately 1.99 billion won, the film ultimately failed to find commercial success.

Following the failure of his debut, Park faced significant hurdles in securing backing for his next project, the neo-noir New World. Potential investors requested either a change in director or a genre shift, arguing that noir was not a commercially viable investment. Despite the initial challenges, New World became a major success, attracting 4.68 million viewers and receiving praise for pioneering a modern iteration of Korean-style noir. Starring Lee Jung-jae, Choi Min-sik, Hwang Jung-min, Park Sung-woong, and Song Ji-Hyo, the film follows an undercover officer Lee Ja-sung (Lee Jung-jae), struggling to maintain his dual identity within a massive crime syndicate. The New York Times lauded the film as "both less bloody and more thoughtful than most of its genre, the shifting-alliances plot becoming more engrossing as it progresses." In 2013, Park was honored with the Jury Award at the 5th Beaune International Thriller Film Festival for his work on the film.

In 2015, Park reunited with Choi Min-sik for the historical drama The Tiger. Set in 1925 during the Japanese colonial period, the film depicts the parallel fates of a legendary hunter and the last tiger of Joseon. Park had sold the screenplay in 2009 while still an unknown writer and initially had no intention of directing it. However, five years later, the distributor, NEW and star Choi Min-sik urged him to lead the production, arguing that his intimate knowledge of the script made him the ideal director.

The Tiger was a massive technical undertaking, costing 14 billion won. The production team faced the challenge of creating a realistic CGI tiger with only a fraction of the digital effects budget used for similar Hollywood projects like Life of Pi. While the film's box office performance did not meet expectations, it received critical acclaim for its high production values and its vivid animation of the Joseon tiger. Park received several nominations for his direction and screenplay, while the film's technical team was recognized with multiple awards for their visual effects work.

=== Establishment of Goldmoon and collaboration with Warner Bros. ===
In 2016, Park founded the film production company Geumwol, taking its name from the Chinese characters for the "Goldmoon" criminal organization featured in New World. Park established the independent venture to secure greater creative freedom and to insulate himself from the professional guilt associated with a major studio's potential financial losses. He noted that while many projects gain recognition, few achieve genuine commercial success, prompting him to pursue a more self-reliant production model.

Following the company's inception, Park collaborated with Warner Bros. to produce the 2017 crime thriller V.I.P.. The film featured an ensemble cast including Jang Dong-gun, Kim Myung-min, Park Hee-soon and Lee Jong-suk, centering on a multi-national manhunt for a suspected serial killer involving South Korea, North Korea, and Interpol officials. Despite its high-profile cast and international distribution, the film underperformed at the box office. Furthermore, it became a subject of significant controversy and was heavily criticized for its graphic and excessive portrayal of violence against women.

In 2018, Park reunited with Park Hee-soon for their third collaboration in the science fiction action-horror film The Witch: Part 1. The Subversion. Starring veteran actress Jo Min-soo and actor Choi Woo-shik, the film follows Ja-yoon (played by Kim Da-mi), a high school student with amnesia who escaped from a mysterious facility as a child. Kim, a rookie actress at the time, was selected for the lead role after an audition process with 1,500-to-1 odds, a breakout performance that launched her career.

Although Park had written the screenplay prior to The Tiger (2015), he delayed the project due to industry skepticism. Major Korean distributors were initially hesitant to back a female-led action film featuring a newcomer with a 6 billion won budget. However, Warner Bros. Korea proved more amenable to the casting of a rookie lead and the film's high-budget requirements. The studio's headquarters responded favorably to the project, expressing interest in developing it into a multi-film franchise. Despite the success of the first installment, which drew 3.18 million viewers, the future of the series became uncertain in September 2020 when Warner Bros. Korea withdrew from the domestic film market following several underperforming productions. This exit stalled development on the anticipated sequel, The Witch: Part 2. The Other One, leaving the status of the burgeoning franchise in doubt.

=== Collaboration with NEW ===
"Night in Paradise is one of the best gangster movies coming from South Korean cinema in recent years. Park Hoon-jung is a director that deserves full attention for his ability to combine the writing of original screenplays with the creation of complex characters that are never stereotypical, together with impressive and masterly directorial skills. His name will certainly be heard even more in the future."

— Alberto Barbera, director of 77th Venice International Film Festival

In 2020, Park collaborated with Next Entertainment World (NEW) to write and direct the crime drama Night in Paradise. The film stars Uhm Tae-goo as a gang member who flees to Jeju Island after carrying out a retaliatory strike against a rival syndicate. While in hiding, he forms a bond with a terminally ill woman (Jeon Yeo-been) while being hunted by a relentless rival executive (Cha Seung-won) and facing betrayal from his own boss (Park Ho-san).

Principal photography took place primarily on Jeju Island over the course of three months. Night in Paradise premiered on September 3, 2020, at the 77th Venice International Film Festival, where it was screened as part of the "Out of Competition" category. Although a theatrical release was originally intended, NEW opted for a direct-to-streaming debut due to the COVID-19 pandemic. The film was released globally on Netflix on April 9, 2021, and subsequently reached the number one position on the platform's "Top 10" most popular content.

Following this collaboration, Park solidified his partnership with the distributor. In November 2020, his production company, Geumwol, signed an equity investment contract with Studio&NEW, a content production affiliate of the NEW media group.

The production of The Witch: Part 2. The Other One was complicated by the withdrawal of Warner Bros. Korea from the domestic market. Park's production company and NEW eventually secured the franchise rights after direct negotiations with Warner Bros. headquarters. Due to the COVID-19 pandemic and resulting budget constraints, the project was reformulated from what was originally intended as a third installment; Park later acknowledged that these structural shifts might affect audience expectations. Released on June 15, 2022, the sequel introduced a new protagonist, "the girl" (Shin Shi-ah), the sole survivor of a destroyed secret laboratory. The narrative follows her pursuit by various factions while revealing her connection to the first film's protagonist, Ja-yoon. Much like her predecessor, Shin was a rookie actress cast through an audition process with odds of 1,408 to 1, a role that launched her professional career.

Park wrote and directed the action-noir film The Childe, starring Kim Seon-ho, Kim Kang-woo, and Go Ara. Following his tradition of casting newcomers, Park selected rookie actor Kang Tae-joo for the role of Marco after an audition process with odds of 1,980 to 1. The narrative follows Marco, a Kopino boxer traveling to South Korea to search for his father, while being relentlessly pursued by a mysterious assassin known as the "Nobleman" (Kim Seon-ho). Filmed on location in Jeju Island and Thailand, The Childe was released theatrically in South Korea on June 21, 2023. The film saw staggered international releases throughout 2023. While the film did not reach its domestic break-even point, it achieved significant success in international markets. It was sold to numerous global distributors, including Well Go USA for North America and various firms across Southeast Asia and India.

The production of The Tyrant, which underwent principal photography from January to April 2023, premiered on Disney+ on August 14, 2024, marking Park's debut in the streaming series format. Although originally developed as a feature film, the project was reformatted into a four-part series. The series reunited Park with actors Cha Seung-won, Kim Seon-ho, Kim Kang-woo, while introducing rookie actress Jo Yoon-su in the leading role. The storyline follows a clandestine unit within South Korea's National Intelligence Service managing the "Tyrant Program," a secret initiative that triggers a high-stakes conflict with U.S. intelligence agents seeking to intercept and terminate the project.

== Filmmaking ==
=== Influences ===
Park's films was primarily shaped by international cinema, particularly Hollywood action films and the golden era of Hong Kong cinema. Because he grew up during a period when the domestic film industry was less prolific, he has noted that his early exposure to South Korean films was relatively limited. Among his most significant influences is Francis Ford Coppola's The Godfather, which he cited as a personal favorite and a foundational blueprint for his own work.

These international touchstones are most visible in New World, which draws on the thematic and tonal traditions of various crime epics. WhileInfernal Affairs and Donnie Brasco were prominent references during production, the film also integrates elements from Election, Hell's Kitchen, Heat, and The Godfather. Rather than attempting to distance himself from these genre staples, Park actively integrated their essence into his work, using them as a foundation to pivot his narratives in distinct directions.

In recent years, Park has expanded his cinematic influences to include domestic works, expressing admiration for the work of contemporary Korean directors such as Bong Joon-ho, Park Chan-wook, and Kim Jee-woon.

=== Directorial style and themes ===
Park is recognized for a distinct directorial style characterized by visually striking, intense action sequences and intricate plotlines. He is particularly skilled at creating tension and suspense, using a combination of music, cinematography, and editing to build a sense of unease and anticipation. A hallmark of Park's films is the use of graphic violence, a stylistic choice that has occasionally drawn criticism. He prioritizes gritty, realistic depictions of crime to ensure his films remain intense and emotionally charged.

Park's narratives frequently explore themes of revenge, betrayal, and morality, characterized by morally ambiguous protagonists and complex storylines. His screenwriting is grounded in social realism, drawing inspiration from contemporary news and societal shifts in South Korea. He treats real-world events as a foundation for nuance, weaving personal observations into his narratives to ground the stakes in current affairs. While his initial drafts are written without specific actors in mind, his process becomes highly iterative during production; once the cast is finalized, he tailors dialogue and character beats to better suit the specific acting styles and nuances of the chosen actors.

A defining characteristic of Park's early filmography is the consistent use of triangular structures to drive narrative tension. With the exception of I Saw the Devil, his screenplays typically center on three-way power dynamics, which he considers the most effective setup for exploring conflicts of class and authority. This structure creates a volatile environment where characters constantly vie for control, preventing a simple protagonist versus antagonist binary. In his film New World, this is manifested through the tense struggle between an undercover police officer, a high-ranking gangster, and the leader of a massive crime syndicate. Similarly, The Unjust, utilizes this triad to explore moral decay through the intersection of a prosecutor, a detective, and a powerful businessman. Through these multifaceted relationships, Park explores broader themes of morality and institutional corruption, a technique that has become a hallmark of his identity as a filmmaker.

Compared to most Korean directors who prefer standalone films, Park is one of the few who has created a sequel that expands the universe of his original film. This approach is rare in Korean cinema and showcases Park's ability to push boundaries and create more complex narratives.

=== Collaborators ===
Park has established a recurring creative circle within the film industry, characterized by long-term partnerships with several key technical collaborators. He has maintained a consistent creative shorthand with film editor Kim Chang-ju on several projects, including The Tiger (2015), V.I.P. (2017), The Witch: Part 1. The Subversion (2018). His visual style has been further defined by his work with cinematographers Chung Chung-hoon and Kim Young-ho. While Chung provided the distinct lighting and camerawork for The Unjust (2010) and have since collaborated on the film New World (2011), Kim Young-ho has lensed the majority of Park's later filmography, including V.I.P. (2017), The Witch: Part 1. The Subversion (2018), Night in Paradise (2021), The Witch: Part 2. The Other One (2022), and The Tyrant (2024).

The auditory identity of Park's filmography is largely the work of music director Mowg. Their partnership began with the thriller I Saw the Devil (2010) and has extended through nearly all of Park's subsequent projects, including Night in Paradise (2021), The Witch: Part 2. The Other One (2022), The Childe (2023), and The Tyrant (2024).

Park is also known for frequently relies on a familiar ensemble of actors. Park Hee-soon is among his most prolific collaborators, appearing in three directed features: The Showdown (2011), V.I.P. (2017), and The Witch: Part 1. The Subversion (2018). Choi Min-sik has been a foundational figure in Park's career, starring in his screenwriting debut, I Saw the Devil (2010), before reuniting for the Park-directed features New World (2011) and The Tiger (2015).

Recurring casts
Actor Work	Cha Seung-won	Choi Min-sik	Jin Goo	Joo Jin-mo	Jo Min-su	Justin Harvey	Kim Byeong-ok	Kim Da-mi	Kim Kang-woo	Kim Seon-ho	Lee Jong-suk	Lee Ki-young	Park Hee-soon	Park Sung-woong	Uhm Tae-goo
I Saw The Devil		check													
The Showdown			check										check		
New World		check		check			check							check	
The Tiger		check													
V.I.P.				check							check		check	check	
The Witch: Part 1. The Subversion					check		check	check					check		
Night in Paradise	check											check			check
The Witch: Part 2. The Other One			check		check	check		check			check				check
The Childe						check			check	check		check			
Tyrant	check					check			check	check					

== Filmography ==
=== Film ===
Year	Title		Credited as			Ref.
Year	English	Korean	Director	Writer	Producer	Ref.
2010	I Saw the Devil	악마를 보았다	No	Yes	No	
2010	The Unjust	부당거래	No	Yes	No	
2011	The Showdown	혈투	Yes	Yes	No	
2013	New World	신세계	Yes	Yes	No	
2015	The Tiger	대호	Yes	Yes	No	
2017	V.I.P.	브이아이피	Yes	Yes	Yes	
2018	The Witch: Part 1. The Subversion	마녀	Yes	Yes	Yes	
2020	Night in Paradise	낙원의 밤	Yes	Yes	Yes	
2022	The Witch: Part 2. The Other One	마녀 2: the other one	Yes	Yes	Yes	
2023	The Childe	귀공자	Yes	Yes	Yes	
2025	Tristes Tropiques	슬픈 열대	Yes	Yes	Yes	

=== Television ===
Year	Title		Credited as			Notes	Ref.
Year	English	Korean	Director	Writer	Producer	Notes	Ref.
2024	The Tyrant	폭군	Yes	Yes	Yes	Disney+ Korea Original Series	

== Accolades ==
=== Awards and nominations ===
Year presented, name of the award ceremony, category, nominated work, and the result of the nomination
Award	Year	Category	Nominated Work	Result	Ref.
8th A-Awards (Note: Hosted by Arena Homme Plus Magazine)	2013	The Best Black Collar Workers of 2013 — Creativity Award	Park Hoon-jung	Won	
Asia Contents Awards & Global OTT Awards	2024	Best Director	The Tyrant	Nominated	
Asian Film Awards	2011	Best Screenplay	The Unjust	Nominated	
Baeksang Arts Awards	2011	Best Screenplay – Film	The Unjust	Nominated	
Baeksang Arts Awards	2013	Best Screenplay – Film	New World	Nominated	
Baeksang Arts Awards	2013	Best New Director	New World	Nominated	
Beaune International Thriller Film Festival	2013	Jury Prize (Second Place)	New World	Won	
Blue Dragon Film Awards	2011	Best Screenplay	The Unjust	Won	
Blue Dragon Film Awards	2013	Best Director	New World	Nominated	
Blue Dragon Film Awards	2021	Best Director	Night in Paradise	Nominated	
Brussels International Fantastic Film Festival	2022	Golden Raven	The Witch: Part 2. The Other One	Nominated	
Brussels International Fantastic Film Festival	2026	Silver Raven	Tristes Tropiques	Won	
Buil Film Awards	2013	Best New Director	New World	Nominated	
L'Etrange Festival	2026	Nouveau Genre Grand Prize	Tristes Tropiques	Won	
Fantasia International Film Festival	2011	Best Screenplay	The Unjust	Won	
Fantasporto Film Festival	2019	Best Film Orient Express	The Witch: Part 1. The Subversion	Won	
Fantastic Fest	2017	Best Director - Thriller Features	V.I.P	Won	
Festival international du film fantastique de Gérardmer	2019	Syfy Jury Prize	The Witch: Part 1. The Subversion	Won	
Golden Cinematography Awards	2016	Best Film	The Tiger	Won	
Golden Cinematography Awards	2016	Best Director	The Tiger	Won	
Grand Bell Awards	2011	Best Screenplay	The Unjust	Nominated	
Grand Bell Awards	2013	Best Director	New World	Nominated	
Grand Bell Awards	2013	Best Screenplay	New World	Nominated	
Grand Bell Awards	2016	Best Screenplay	The Tiger	Nominated	
Sitges Film Festival	2013	Focus Asia Award	New World	Won	
Sitges Film Festival	2025	Best feature film in the Òrbita section	Tristes Tropiques	Nominated	

=== State honors ===
Name of country, award ceremony, year given, and name of honor
Country	Award Ceremony	Year	Honor	Ref.
South Korea	Jeju Special Self-Governing Province Ceremony	2023	Jeju Honorary Citizen	

== See also ==
- List of Korean film directors
- Cinema of Korea
