= Choi Soo-young filmography =

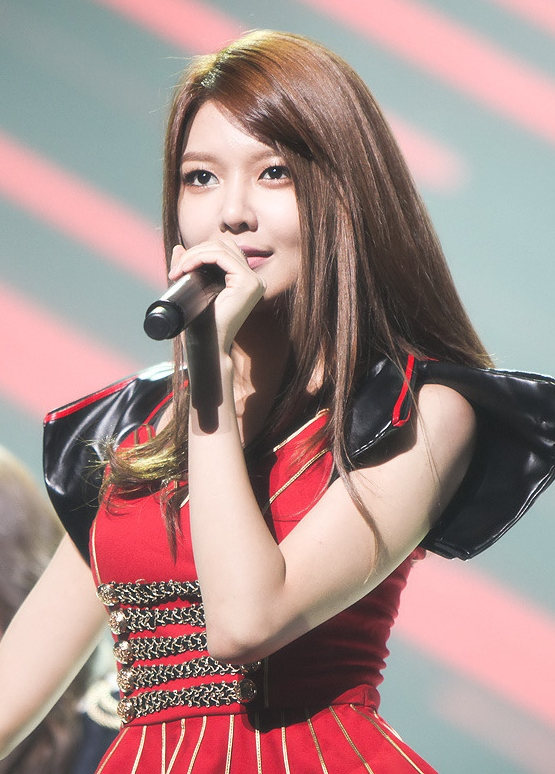
- Choi in 2012
- Film: 10
- Television series: 19
- Web series: 2
- Television show: 6
- Hosting: 5

Choi Soo-young (known mononymously as Sooyoung) is a South Korean singer and actress. She is a member of the girl group Girls' Generation.

Choi has been active in acting since 2007, making her debut in the sitcom Unstoppable Marriage. She went on to appear in various television dramas, including Third Hospital (2012), Dating Agency: Cyrano (2013), Run On (2020–2021), If You Wish Upon Me (2022), and Not Others (2023). In film, Choi has starred in productions such as Hello Schoolgirl (2008) and Miss & Mrs. Cops (2019), Ballerina (2025) building a steady career alongside her music activities.

== Film ==
Year	Title	Role	Notes	Ref.
2008	Hello, Schoolgirl	Jeong Da-jeong		
2012	I AM.	Herself	Biographical film of SM Town	
2015	SMTown: The Stage	Herself	Documentary film of SM Town	
2019	The Poem, My Old Mother	Narration		
2019	Memories of a Dead End	Yumi		
2019	Miss & Mrs. Cops	Jang-mi		
2019	A Little Princess	Adult Gongju	Special appearance	
2021	New Year Blues	Oh Wol		
2024	Dead Man	Hipster		
2025	Ballerina	Katla Park		
2026	Okay! Madam 2	Anya		

== Television series ==
Year	Title	Role	Notes	Ref.
2008	Unstoppable Marriage	Soo-young		
2010	Oh! My Lady	Herself	Cameo (Episode 7)	
2011	Paradise Ranch	Miss Soo	Cameo (Episode 3)	
2012	A Gentleman's Dignity	Herself	Cameo (Episode 5)	
2012	The Third Hospital	Lee Eui-jin		
2013	Dating Agency: Cyrano	Gong Min-young		
2014	My Spring Days	Lee Bom-yi		
2016	Perfect Sense	Jung Ah-yeon		
2016	Squad 38	Cheon Sung-hee		
2017–2018	Man in the Kitchen	Lee Roo-ri		
2020	Tell Me What You Saw	Cha Soo-young		
2020–2021	Run On	Seo Dan-ah		
2021	Move to Heaven	Son Yoo-rim	Cameo (Episode 6, 9)	
2022	Uncle	Top Stars	Cameo (Episode 13)	
2022	If You Wish Upon Me	Seo Yeon-joo		
2022	Fanletter, Please!	Han Kang-hee		
2023	Not Others	Kim Jin-hee		
2025	Second Shot at Love	Han Geum-joo		
2025-2026	I Dol I	Maeng Se-na		
2026	The Practical Guide to Love	Hyun-ju	Special appearance	

== Web series ==
Year	Title	Role	Ref.
2017	Someone You Might Know	Lee Ahn	
2021	So I Married the Anti-fan	Lee Geun-young	

== Television shows ==
Year	Title	Role	Notes	Ref.
2010	Haha Mong Show: Pilot	Regular member		
2012–2014	TV Entertainment Tonight	Host		
2017	Saturday Night Live Korea	Host	Season 9, Ep 1	
2022	Household Mate	Special member	Episode 3	
2023	The Wedding War	Host		
2023	R U Next?	Host		

== Hosting ==
Year	Event	Notes	Ref.
2011	K-Pop All Star Live in Niigata	with Tiffany and Yuri	
2021	30th Seoul Music Awards	With Shin Dong-yup and Kim Hee-chul	
2022	31st Buil Film Awards	With Kim Nam-gil	
2022	2022 MBC Drama Awards	With Kim Sung-joo	
2023	2023 Marie Claire Asia Star Awards		
2024	Closing ceremony of the 29th Busan International Film Festival	with Gong Myung	
