= Okay! Madam =

2020 South Korean action comedy film

- Theatrical release poster
- Hangul: 오케이 마담
- RR: Okei madam
- MR: Ok'ei madam
- Directed by: Lee Cheol-ha
- Written by: Shin Hyun-seong
- Produced by: Han Jae-duk; Kim Yoon-mi
- Starring: Uhm Jung-hwa; Park Sung-woong; Lee Sang-yoon; Bae Jung-nam; Lee Sun-bin
- Cinematography: Kim Jeong-woo
- Edited by: Kim Sang-bum
- Music by: Hwang Sang-jun
- Production companies: Sanai Pictures; OAL
- Distributed by: Plus M Entertainment
- Release date: 12 August 2020
- Running time: 100 minutes
- Country: South Korea
- Language: Korean
- Box office: US$9.4 million

Okay! Madam (Korean: 오케이 마담) is a 2020 South Korean action comedy film directed by Lee Cheol-ha. Paying homage to the Yes Madam film series, it stars Uhm Jung-hwa and Park Sung-woong as a couple whose first overseas trip turns into a fight for survival when their plane is hijacked, forcing them to rely on long-hidden skills to save the passengers. Distributed by Plus M Entertainment, the film was released in South Korea on August 12, 2020.

== Plot ==
A North Korean female secret agent and her partner, Chul-seung, infiltrating a government building to steal classified North Korean documents. After obtaining the files, the secret agent shoots Chul-seung and escapes on her own.

Ten years later, in a neighborhood in Seoul, a woman named Mi-young makes a living selling twisted bread sticks. Her husband, Suk-hwan, repairs computers, and they have a young daughter named Na-ri. The family wins a free vacation to Hawaii, but Mi-young initially refuses to go, believing that traveling is too expensive. However, after Na-ri comes home in tears, saying she has never been on a trip like her friends, Mi-young changes her mind and agrees to take the family on the vacation.

On the day of departure, a covert team of North Korean agents is dispatched to track down the secret agent after receiving intelligence that she will be aboard the flight. The team is led by Chul-seung, who miraculously survived being shot years earlier. Also on board are a National Intelligence Service (NIS) agent assigned to monitor the flight and a mysterious young woman whose face is concealed. Although traveling together, Mi-young and Na-ri are seated in first class, while Suk-hwan sits in economy class, where he strikes up a conversation with an elderly passenger.

Mid-flight, the North Korean agents suddenly draw their weapons and seize control of the aircraft. Fortunately, Mi-young is in the rear lavatory and escapes detection. Meanwhile, the NIS agent remains fast asleep, completely unaware of the hijacking. The agents search for the secret agent and initially suspect the masked woman, but she is actually the famous actress Ahn Se-ra, who is secretly traveling incognito.

When one of the agents attempts to assault Mi-young, she effortlessly knocks him out with impressive martial arts skills. It is then revealed that Mi-young is, in fact, the secret agent. Years earlier, she underwent plastic surgery to change her appearance before fleeing to South Korea, where she married, had a child, and started a new life.

Suk-hwan sneaks into the cargo hold and uses a computer to alert the NIS about the hijacking, revealing that he too was once a secret agent. Disguised as a flight attendant, Mi-young takes down several hijackers, but she and her husband are eventually captured. To protect herself, Na-ri pretends that Ahn Se-ra is her mother. Soon afterward, the hijackers unexpectedly turn against Chul-seung. Their true plan is to crash the plane into the sea while taking Mi-young back to North Korea in exchange for a huge reward.

Chul-seung is imprisoned alongside Mi-young and Suk-hwan. He explains that Mi-young's father once developed a cache of nuclear weapons that can only be unlocked by scanning Mi-young's retina. If those weapons fall into the wrong hands, the entire world could be in danger. A flight attendant frees Chul-seung and the couple, allowing them to fight back. Together, Mi-young and Chul-seung defeat all of the North Korean agents.

Just when it seems the crisis is over, the elderly passenger takes Na-ri hostage at gunpoint and confronts Mi-young and Suk-hwan. He reveals that he was the one who murdered Mi-young's father years ago. He orders Mi-young to return to North Korea with him, but she kicks him out of the aircraft.

The teddy bear the old man had given Na-ri is revealed to contain a time bomb meant to destroy the plane. Mi-young throws it out of the aircraft moments before it explodes. Chul-seung bids farewell to Mi-young's family and parachutes out of the plane.

The flight ultimately ends safely, with everyone surviving the ordeal. Mi-young's family goes on to enjoy a wonderful vacation in Hawaii. The NIS agent finally wakes up aboard the now-empty plane. Checking his phone, he discovers that his superior has sent him numerous messages informing him that he has been fired.

== Cast ==
- Uhm Jung-hwa as Lee Mi-young
- Park Sung-woong as Oh Suk-hwan
- Lee Sang-yoon as Lee Chul-seung
- Bae Jung-nam as Jung Hyun-min
- Lee Sun-bin as Ahn Se-ra / young Gwi-sun
- Jeong Su-been as Na-ri
- Yu Ha-jun as Kim Ha-rim
- Park Ji-il as Polaris
- Choi Jin-ho as NIS director
- Kim Pub-lae as Lieutenant General Park
- Ju Seok-tae as Mr. Shin
- Kim Byeong-ok as Jang Pil-joon
- Kim Hye-eun as Office manager
- Jeon Soo-kyeong as Flight passenger
- Kim Nam-gil as NIS agent
- Jung Man-sik as Pilot
- Kim Jong-soo as Choi Young-cheol

== Sequel ==
A sequel titled Okay! Madam 2, was shot in October 2025 with Uhm Jung-hwa reprising her lead role of Lee Mi-young. It was released on August 12, 2026.
