= New World (2013 film) =

2013 film directed by Park Hoon-jung

- Theatrical release poster
- Hangul: 신세계
- Hanja: 新世界
- RR: Sinsegye
- MR: Sinsegye
- Directed by: Park Hoon-jung
- Written by: Park Hoon-jung
- Produced by: Han Jae-duk; Kim Hyun-woo
- Starring: Lee Jung-jae; Choi Min-sik; Hwang Jung-min
- Cinematography: Chung Chung-hoon; Yu Eok
- Edited by: Moon Se-kyung
- Music by: Jo Yeong-wook
- Distributed by: Next Entertainment World
- Release date: 21 February 2013
- Running time: 134 minutes
- Country: South Korea
- Languages: Korean; Mandarin
- Box office: US$31.7 million

New World (Korean: 신세계; RR: Sinsegye) is a 2013 South Korean epic crime film written and directed by Park Hoon-jung. It stars Lee Jung-jae, Choi Min-sik, Hwang Jung-min, and Park Sung-woong. In the film, Lee Ja-sung (Lee) struggles to balance his role as an undercover police officer with his rise in South Korea's crime syndicate.

== Plot ==
Lee Ja-sung is an undercover police officer who has been working in Goldmoon International, South Korea's largest corporate crime syndicate. During his 8 years, he is constantly at risk of discovery. Chief Kang promises to reassign Ja-sung to an overseas position in the police force, but he continually delays his promise. When Ja-sung threatens to quit the police force, Chief Kang threatens to leak his true identity to the crime syndicate, which would ensure his painful death.

The chairman of Goldmoon dies in an accident, and two men fight to succeed him. Jung Chung is backed by the Chinese-descended Northmoon clan. Lee Joong-gu is backed by the Jaebum faction.

Chief Kang sets Jung and Joong-gu against each other in hopes that they will defeat each other and clear the path for Jang Su-ki to become the new chairman. Su-ki is nominally the vice president of the company, but he has no real power. Chief Kang hopes that the Goldmoon company will be weak enough to defeat if led by the weak Su-ki. Chief Kang blackmails Jung and convinces him to leak evidence about Joong-gu in exchange for a pardon for his own crimes. After he arrests Joong-gu, he informs Joong-gu that Jung betrayed him. Enraged, Joong-gu sends his men to assassinate Jung. Joong-gu's men ambush Jung and fatally wound him. In the meantime, Joong-gu's men break into Ja-sung's house. Ja-sung's wife is saved by the police but suffers a miscarriage from shock.

Shattered by Jung's attack and terrified of what Joong-gu will do to him once he is released from prison, Ja-sung begs Chief Kang to reassign him and let him disappear. Chief Kang refuses to keep his promise and destroys Ja-sung's police profile to force him to continue to work for Goldmoon. After that Ja-sung goes to see Jung at the hospital and, before his death, Jung tells Ja-sung to decide his loyalty. Ja-sung understands that Jung discovered that he is an undercover cop, but he pretends not to know because of their friendship.

With the death of his closest partner in crime, Ja-sung decides to choose where his loyalty lies and amass power. He takes control of Jung's faction and secures the loyalty of Su-ki's men. When Su-ki attempts to have Ja-sung executed, his men kill him instead. At Ja-sung's bidding, his underlings murder Chief Kang, Police Director Ko, and Joong-gu. As a result, Ja-sung's past undercover identity remains a secret while he smoothly ascends to become the new chairman of Goldmoon.

The scene cuts to six years in the past, when Ja-sung and Jung started out as small-time thugs. Their friendship is evident even back then, and together they eliminate a rival gang. In the aftermath of their victory, Ja-sung smiles for the first time.

== Cast ==
- Lee Jung-jae as Lee Ja-sung
- Choi Min-sik as Section chief Kang Hyung-cheol
- Hwang Jung-min as Jung Chung
- Park Sung-woong as Lee Joong-gu
- Song Ji-hyo as Lee Shin Woo
- Kim Yoon-seong as Oh Seok-mu
- Na Kwang-hoon as Yang Moon-seok
- Park Seo-yeon as Han Joo-kyung
- Choi Il-hwa as Vice Chairman Jang Su-ki
- Joo Jin-mo as Police Director Ko
- Jang Gwang as Director Yang
- Kwon Tae-won as Director Park
- Kim Hong-pa as Director Kim
- Kim Byeong-ok as Yanbian hobo
- Woo Dong-gi as Yanbian hobo
- Park In-soo as Yanbian hobo
- Jung Young-gi as Yanbian hobo
- Park Sang-gyu as policeman
- Ryu Sung-hyun as executive
- Jung Gi-seop as executive
- Lee Woo-jin as executive
- Sung Nak-kyung as executive
- Jung Mi-sung as detective
- Ahn Su-ho as Choi
- Son Byung-hee as taxi driver
- Han Jae-duk as gang boss
- Lee Geung-young as Chairman Seok Dong-chool (cameo)
- Ryoo Seung-bum as Constable Kang Cheol-hwa (cameo)
- Ma Dong-seok as Section chief Cho Hyung-joo (cameo)

== Critical reception ==
The New York Times called the film "both less bloody and more thoughtful than most of its genre, the shifting-alliances plot becoming more engrossing as it progresses."

Los Angeles Times wrote that "writer-director Park Hoon-jung tells this twisty story of internecine warfare within a Korean corporate crime syndicate with patience, elegance and no small amount of bloodshed."

Salon said that "the rewards come from a satisfying plot, distinctive characters and a series of memorable showpieces, and Park handles all three demands well," and "no one in American movies has made a crime opera this good in years."

Film Business Asia praised it as "the best played and most gripping Korean gangster movie since Yoo Ha's A Dirty Carnival. [...] not only showcases three of South Korea's best actors at the top of their game but also manages to sustain its 2 and a half-hour running time on sheer character drama rather than action or violence."

The film also received many negative reviews as well. David Noh from Film Journal wrote "There's nothing wrong with reworking films like Election and Infernal Affairs. Scorsese won an Oscar for The Departed, his version of the latter. Sadly, Park doesn't bring anything new to the genre, apart from a lot more crane shots and one too many stoic grimaces."

Linda Barnard from Thestar.com gave it 2 stars out of 4, writing "South Korean gangster film New World tries to expand the genre with nods to The Godfather but can't escape the over-the-top acting, expansive violence and overdone story typical of Seoul-made crime dramas."

Slant Magazine also gave it a negative review, stating "Bestowed with a somewhat novel twist, Park Hoon-jung's New World employs the good-guy/bad-guy power dynamic of the typical cop-gangster flick and treats it as the primary source of the story's intrigue. But the mole-imbedded gang war at the heart of this film plays out less like an organic round of Go between cops and criminals than the elaborate scheme of one character operating like a sadistic Creator and wreaking havoc in the lives of his ants."

== Box office ==
The film scored admissions of 4.67 million, with a total gross of ₩34,831,698,405 (or US$31,212,801).

== Remake ==
After competing with DreamWorks, Paramount Pictures, and Warner Bros., Sony Pictures picked up the remake rights, reportedly in the mid six-figure range. The production company Vertigo Entertainment will handle the project with producers Roy Lee and Dan Lin, Jon Silk and John Powers Middleton as executive producers, and Will Fetters as screenwriter. The 2018 Tamil movie Chekka Chivantha Vaanam was reported to be the "Indianized version" of this movie owing to its similarity in plot, characterization and the narrative.

== Awards and nominations ==
Award	Year	Category	Recipient	Result	Ref.
49th Baeksang Arts Awards	2013	Best Actor	Hwang Jung-min	Nominated	
49th Baeksang Arts Awards	2013	Best Supporting Actor	Park Sung-woong	Nominated	
49th Baeksang Arts Awards	2013	Best New Director	Park Hoon-jung	Nominated	
49th Baeksang Arts Awards	2013	Best Screenplay	Park Hoon-jung	Nominated	
55th Beaune International Thriller Film Festival	2013	Jury Prize (Second Place)	New World	Won	
22nd Buil Film Awards	2013	Best Actor	Hwang Jung-min	Won	
22nd Buil Film Awards	2013	Best Supporting Actor	Park Sung-woong	Nominated	
22nd Buil Film Awards	2013	Best New Director	Park Hoon-jung	Nominated	
50th Grand Bell Awards	2013	Best Director	Park Hoon-jung	Nominated	
50th Grand Bell Awards	2013	Best Actor	Hwang Jung-min	Nominated	
50th Grand Bell Awards	2013	Best Supporting Actor	Park Sung-woong	Nominated	
50th Grand Bell Awards	2013	Best Screenplay	Park Hoon-jung	Nominated	
50th Grand Bell Awards	2013	Best Lighting	Bae Il-hyuk	Nominated	
50th Grand Bell Awards	2013	Best Music	Jo Yeong-wook	Won	
50th Grand Bell Awards	2013	Best Art Direction	Cho Hwa-sung	Nominated	
34th Blue Dragon Film Awards	2013	Best Film	New World	Nominated	
34th Blue Dragon Film Awards	2013	Best Director	Park Hoon-jung	Nominated	
34th Blue Dragon Film Awards	2013	Best Actor	Hwang Jung-min	Won	
34th Blue Dragon Film Awards	2013	Best Supporting Actor	Park Sung-woong	Nominated	
34th Blue Dragon Film Awards	2013	Best Cinematography	Chung Chung-hoon, Yu Eok	Nominated	
34th Blue Dragon Film Awards	2013	Best Lighting	Bae Il-hyuk	Nominated	
34th Blue Dragon Film Awards	2013	Best Art Direction	Cho Hwa-sung	Nominated	
46th Sitges Film Festival	2013	Best Feature Film (Focus Asia Award)	New World	Won	
9th Max Movie Awards	2014	Best Actor	Hwang Jung-min	Nominated	
19th Chunsa Film Art Awards	2014	Best Actor	Hwang Jung-min	Nominated	
