= For the Emperor =

- Theatrical poster
- Directed by: Park Sang-jun
- Starring: Lee Min-ki; Park Sung-woong
- Edited by: Kim Chang-ju; Park Gyeong-suk
- Music by: Dalpalan
- Production company: Opus Pictures
- Distributed by: Next Entertainment World; United Pictures
- Release date: June 12, 2014
- Running time: 104 minutes
- Country: South Korea
- Language: Korean

For the Emperor (Korean: 황제를 위하여; RR: Hwangjereul wihayeo) is a 2014 South Korean neo-noir action thriller film directed by Park Sang-jun, starring Lee Min-ki and Park Sung-woong.

== Plot ==
Promising baseball player Lee Hwan was kicked out of his league and lost everything after being implicated in a match fixing scandal. While waiting for an opportunity to make a comeback, the disgraced pro gets recruited into working for Emperor Capital, the biggest private loan company in Busan. Its loan shark boss, Jeong Sang-ha leads his organized crime mob with a combination of authority, loyalty and cold-bloodedness. Sang-ha takes the naïve young man under his wing, and fascinated by money and power, Hwan soon finds himself climbing the ranks at Emperor Capital. Hwan and Sang-ha successfully take control of all Busan gangs, collecting money through gambling and lending, and killing hundreds of people in the process. Hwan also falls under the charms of a bar owner, Cha Yeon-soo. But when Yeon-soo suddenly vanishes, Hwan suspects that Sang-ha had something to do with her disappearance, and begins to face off against his mentor in a cutthroat, winner-takes-all rivalry.

== Cast ==
- Lee Min-ki as Lee Hwan
- Park Sung-woong as Jeong Sang-ha
- Lee Tae-im as Cha Yeon-soo
- Kim Jong-gu as Han-deuk
- Jeong Heung-chae as Straw cutter
- Lee Jae-won as Kyeong-soo
- Lee Yoo-joon
- Han Jae-young
