= My Sister, the Pig Lady =

- Theatrical poster
- Directed by: Jang Moon-il
- Written by: Jang Moon-il
- Produced by: Kim Sang-young; Han Sang-bum
- Starring: Hwang Jung-eum; Lee Jong-hyuk; Choi Yeo-jin; Park Jin-ju
- Cinematography: Kim Young-ho; Lee Tae-oh
- Edited by: Shin Min-kyung; Han Young-gyu
- Music by: Jung Cha-sik
- Production company: ifilm Corporation
- Distributed by: CGV Arthouse
- Release date: September 10, 2015
- Running time: 102 minutes
- Country: South Korea
- Language: Korean

My Sister, the Pig Lady (Korean: 돼지 같은 여자; lit. 'A Pig-like Woman') is a 2015 South Korean romantic comedy film directed by Jang Moon-il. It was invited to the 39th Montreal World Film Festival as part of their World Greats selection. The film also won Grand Prize at the Osaka Asian Film Festival.

== Plot ==
In a small seaside village, where all the young men have left for the city, three young women, Jae-hwa, Yoo-ja, and Mi-ja hope to catch the eye of Joon-seob, the only eligible bachelor left in town. Jae-hwa has plans to make her family prosperous by raising pigs, but the endeavor is more difficult than she imagined: the pigs keep wandering away. They roam the town and every now and then get stuck in a rut. A rumor spreads that Jae-hwa's mother is having an affair. Not that it matters to her father, who is generally drunk, or to her younger brother, who keeps getting into fights. Joon-seob, who has stood by Jae-hwa despite her family's stream of misfortunes finally take his relationship with Jae-hwa to the next level, and they begin dating. But Yoo-ja and Mi-ja are not about to give up. They begin to scheme...

== Cast ==
- Hwang Jung-eum as Jae-hwa
- Lee Jong-hyuk as Joon-seob
- Choi Yeo-jin as Yoo-ja
- Park Jin-ju as Mi-ja
