= The Showdown (2011 film) =

2011 South Korean film

- Film poster
- Hangul: 혈투
- Hanja: 血鬪
- RR: Hyeoltu
- MR: Hyŏlt'u
- Directed by: Park Hoon-jung
- Written by: Park Hoon-jung
- Produced by: Kim Soo-jin; Yun In-beom; Lee Keun-ok
- Starring: Park Hee-soon; Jin Goo; Ko Chang-seok
- Cinematography: Kim Young-ho
- Edited by: Shin Min-kyung
- Music by: Won Il
- Distributed by: Sidus FNH
- Release date: February 24, 2011
- Running time: 111 minutes
- Country: South Korea
- Language: Korean
- Box office: US$302,703

The Showdown (Korean: 혈투) is a 2011 South Korean historical action film.

== Plot ==
In the 11th year of Gwanghaegun, Manchus invade Joseon and the Joseon soldiers decide to help Ming China fight against the Manchus. In the middle of Manchuria, three Korean soldiers who have barely survived are cornered by the Manchu forces and must fight a bloody battle.

== Cast ==
- Park Hee-soon: Heon-myung
- Jin Goo: Do-young
- Ko Chang-seok: Du-soo
- Kim Kap-soo: No-shin
- Jang Hee-jin: Seo-hyun
- Jeon Kuk-hwan: Dang-soo
- Choi Il-hwa: Do-young's father
- Lee Jong-su
- Kim Hyeong-jong
- Jung Young-ki
- Ki Se-hyung
- Kim Young-hoon as Blue army 2
