= The Unjust =

- Theatrical release poster
- Hangul: 부당거래
- Hanja: 不當去來
- RR: Budanggeorae
- MR: Pudanggŏrae
- Directed by: Ryoo Seung-wan
- Written by: Park Hoon-jung
- Produced by: Koo Bon-han; Kim Yun-ho; Ryoo Seung-wan; Kang Hye-jung; Han Jae-duk
- Starring: Hwang Jung-min; Ryoo Seung-bum; Yoo Hae-jin
- Cinematography: Chung Chung-hoon
- Edited by: Kim Sang-bum; Kim Jae-bum
- Music by: Jo Yeong-wook
- Production company: Filmmaker R&K
- Distributed by: CJ Entertainment
- Release date: October 28, 2010
- Running time: 119 minutes
- Country: South Korea
- Language: Korean
- Box office: US$18.2 million

The Unjust (Korean: 부당거래; RR: Budanggeorae; lit. 'Bad deal') is a 2010 South Korean crime thriller film directed by Ryoo Seung-wan. It is a dark and bitter denunciation of corruption in the South Korean justice system. The film was a critical and commercial success, with 2.7 million admissions at the box office and winning several awards, including Best Film, Best Director and Best Screenplay at the 2011 Blue Dragon Film Awards.

This is director Ryoo Seung-wan's fifth collaboration with his younger brother, actor Ryoo Seung-bum. Lead actors Hwang Jung-min and Ryoo Seung-bum previously worked together in Bloody Tie (2006).

== Plot ==
After the rape and murder of 5 elementary schoolgirls, a crime which deeply upsets the entire country, a fleeing suspect is shot and killed by the police. This leads to negative publicity because the guilt of the suspect cannot be proven, and the real attacker may still be at large. Under pressure from the Blue House, a senior police official assigns Choi, a police captain, to a highly sensitive mission, namely, to find a former child rapist who can take the blame. Choi, in return, is promised a promotion and the dismissal of an internal investigation against him, which was caused by his brother-in-law receiving money from Jang, a corrupt businessman. Meanwhile, a corrupt prosecutor named Joo cancels the criminal charges, brought about by an investigation led by Choi, against a corrupt businessman named Kim, who is also Jang's rival in a bid for a construction deal.

Choi searches through several profiles of rapists, and having settled upon Lee, a school-bus driver, he enlists Jang and his henchmen to kidnap Lee and coach him in how the confession should be delivered. At the same time, Jang takes photographs of Kim and Joo playing golf and has a henchman approach Kim and murder him. The photographs are mailed to Joo to ensure that Jang will never be prosecuted. At the police station, Lee is denied immunity from the death penalty, and as such, reneges on the deal and tells Joo the truth. In response, Jang sends the earlier henchman to arrest and murder Lee from within the jail. This makes Joo furious and he investigates Choi, with the help of a corrupt journalist, finding evidence of his and Jang's partnership. Choi, in response, pleads with Joo not to ruin his career, and the two agree to a truce.

Meanwhile, Jang, who is tired of being blackmailed by Choi, has saved recordings of Lee's coaching session and black-mails Choi in return. Choi reacts by murdering Jang using a rigged elevator and pretends to make peace with Jang's assistant before murdering him as well. However, this incident is seen by Choi's lieutenant, who wrestles with Choi and tries to stop him. During the struggle, Choi accidentally kills his lieutenant, and afterward stabs the dead body with a knife, so that the police will assume that Jang's assistant and the lieutenant killed each other. As Choi receives his promotion and the lieutenant's family mourns, Choi's subordinates become suspicious and privately capture another one of Jang's henchmen, who served as Jang's videographer and who recorded Jang's death and the ensuing fight. Ironically, DNA testing proves successful on the body of one of the girls mentioned earlier, and Lee is proven to be the real attacker all along. Nonetheless, the subordinates release the video of the coaching to prove Choi's connection with Jang, and what is more, they order Jang's henchman to ambush Choi at a charnel house and murder him in revenge. The final scene reveals that they also released the golf photographs, but in spite of the media reporting that charges will be filed, Joo meets with his father-in-law, a senior official who calmly assures him that everything will be alright.

== Cast ==
- Hwang Jung-min ... Police captain Choi Cheol-gi
- Ryoo Seung-bum ... Public prosecutor (D.A.) Joo Yang
- Yoo Hae-jin ... Gangster/businessman Jang Seok-gu
- Chun Ho-jin ... Police bureau chief Kang
- Shin Soo-yeon ... Tae-ra
- Ma Dong-seok ... Police lieutenant Ma Dae-ho
- Woo Don-gi ... Lee Dong-seok, the scapegoat
- Jo Yeong-jin ... TK chairman Kim Yang-su
- Jung Man-sik ... Assistant D.A. Gong
- Lee Sung-min ... Chief prosecutor/D.A.
- Kim Su-hyeon ... Soo-il
- Gu Bon-woong ... Yoon-jjang
- Kim Min-jae ... Detective Lee
- Lee Hee-joon ... Detective Nam
- Oh Jung-se ... Reporter Kim
- Lee Jong-ju ... Representative Goh
- Baek Seung-ik ... killer
- Song Sae-byeok ... Cheol-gi's brother-in-law
- Go Seo-hee ... Cheol-gi's younger sister
- Kwak Ja-hyeong ... Detective Kwak
- Jo Jong-geun ... Detective Jo
- Kim Gi-cheon ... old inspector
- Lee Do-hyeon ... young inspector
- Hwang Byeong-guk ... defense counsel
- Lee Kyoung-mi ... forensic examiner
- Kim Weon-beom ... squad leader Park
- Kang Hyeon-joong ... squad member
- Jo Ha-seok ... squad members
- Lee Mi-do ... Dong-seok's wife
- Park Ha-yeong ... Dong-seok's daughter
- Kim Seung-hun ... Yu Min-cheol
- Jung Jin-gak ... President of South Korea
- Kim Hye-ji ... Joo Yang's wife
- Park Seo-yeon ... Joo Yang's hostess
- Kang Hae-in ... Reporter Kim's hostess
- Ahn Gil-kang ... team leader
- Lee Chun-yeon ... National Police Agency head
- Lee Joon-ik ... President Jeong
- Jo Cheol-hyeon ... Haedong investor
- Oh Seung-hyeon ... Haedong investor

== Film festivals ==
The Unjust has screened at numerous film festivals around the world, including the Panorama section of the 61st Berlin International Film Festival, the Hong Kong International Film Festival, the Shanghai International Film Festival, the New York Asian Film Festival, the Fantasia Festival, the Hawaii International Film Festival, the Vladivostok International Film Festival - Pacific Meridian, the Sitges Film Festival, the London Korean Film Festival, and the Udine Far East Film Festival.

== Awards and nominations ==
Year	Award	Category	Recipient	Result
2010	13th Director's Cut Awards	Best Director	Ryoo Seung-wan	Won
2011	5th Asian Film Awards	Best Supporting Actor	Ryoo Seung-bum	Nominated
2011	5th Asian Film Awards	Best Screenplay	Park Hoon-jung	Nominated
2011	2nd Seoul Art and Culture Awards	Best Film Director	Ryoo Seung-wan	Won
2011	47th Baeksang Arts Awards	Best Film	The Unjust	Nominated
2011	47th Baeksang Arts Awards	Best Director	Ryoo Seung-wan	Nominated
2011	47th Baeksang Arts Awards	Best Actor	Ryoo Seung-bum	Nominated
2011	47th Baeksang Arts Awards	Best Screenplay	Park Hoon-jung	Nominated
2011	15th Fantasia International Film Festival	Best Actor	Hwang Jung-min	Won
2011	15th Fantasia International Film Festival	Best Actor	Ryoo Seung-bum	Won
2011	15th Fantasia International Film Festival	Best Screenplay	Park Hoon-jung	Won
2011	20th Buil Film Awards	Best Film	The Unjust	Nominated
2011	20th Buil Film Awards	Best Director	Ryoo Seung-wan	Nominated
2011	20th Buil Film Awards	Best Actor	Ryoo Seung-bum	Won
2011	44th Sitges Film Festival	Best Film (Casa Asia section)	The Unjust	Won
2011	48th Grand Bell Awards	Best Film	The Unjust	Nominated
2011	48th Grand Bell Awards	Best Director	Ryoo Seung-wan	Nominated
2011	48th Grand Bell Awards	Best Supporting Actor	Yoo Hae-jin	Nominated
2011	48th Grand Bell Awards	Best Screenplay	Park Hoon-jung	Nominated
2011	48th Grand Bell Awards	Best Editing	Kim Sang-bum, Kim Jae-bum	Nominated
2011	48th Grand Bell Awards	Best Planning	Koo Bon-han	Nominated
2011	32nd Blue Dragon Film Awards	Best Film	The Unjust	Won
2011	32nd Blue Dragon Film Awards	Best Director	Ryoo Seung-wan	Won
2011	32nd Blue Dragon Film Awards	Best Supporting Actor	Yoo Hae-jin	Nominated
2011	32nd Blue Dragon Film Awards	Best Screenplay	Park Hoon-jung	Won
2011	32nd Blue Dragon Film Awards	Best Cinematography	Chung Chung-hoon	Nominated
2011	32nd Blue Dragon Film Awards	Best Lighting	Bae Il-hyeok	Nominated
