= The Tiger (2015 film) =

- Theatrical release Poster
- Hangul: 대호
- Hanja: 大虎
- RR: Daeho
- MR: Taeho
- Directed by: Park Hoon-jung
- Written by: Park Hoon-jung
- Produced by: Han Jae-duk; Park Min-jung
- Starring: Choi Min-sik; Jung Man-sik; Kim Sang-ho; Sung Yu-bin; Ren Osugi; Jung Suk-won
- Cinematography: Lee Mo-gae; Jeong Gwi-ho
- Edited by: Kim Chang-ju
- Music by: Jo Yeong-wook
- Production companies: Sanai Pictures; Next Entertainment World
- Distributed by: Aeon Pix Studios (India)
- Release date: December 17, 2015
- Country: South Korea
- Languages: Korean; Japanese; English; Hindi; German
- Box office: US$11.1 million

The Tiger (also known as The Tiger: An Old Hunter's Tale, Korean: 대호; Hanja: 大虎; RR: Daeho; lit. 'Big Tiger') is a 2015 South Korean period action drama film written and directed by Park Hoon-jung. The film stars Choi Min-sik as a hunter prepared to kill the last tiger of Joseon.

== Plot ==
In Japanese-occupied Korea during 1925, revered hunter Chun Man-duk lives with his teenage son, Seok, in a hut near Mount Jirisan. Following a tragic accident years ago in which he accidentally killed his beloved wife while hunting for a large tiger to financially provide for his family, he has retired his rifle, given up hunting, and become a humble herb gatherer among his cherished mountains. The Japanese governor general overseeing the occupation gathers tiger pelts as a hobby to display cultural dominance over the Korean people, and soon becomes obsessed with killing possibly the last remaining tiger in Korea, an enormous, 400 kg (880 lb) one-eyed male that lives on the mountain; he has killed scores of hunters and evaded capture many times, including Chun Man-duk and his former hunting companions. The tiger is known locally in hushed tones as the Mountain Lord (Korean: San-ui Gunju; Japanese: Yama no omo), and locals who revere it fear that its demise will allow unchecked numbers of wolves and boars, thereby upsetting the ecological balance. Gu-kyung, Chun Man-duk's former hunting partner, is the resolute but ruthless leader of a band of Korean hunters that continually attempt to track and kill the Mountain Lord for the bounty, including by killing its mate and two cubs while using the latter for bait.

It is revealed that years ago, Man-duk mortally wounded the Mountain Lord's mother when she leaped at him as he neared her kill to defend her two nearby cubs. Man-duk spares the one-eyed cub and its sibling by intervening against the more junior hunter Gu-kyung, who delivered the killing shot on their mother. He advises Gu-kyung to leave them to their fate, allowing the mountain to decide if they are to survive. Man-duk, however, secretly relocates the cubs to a safe den, though the one-eyed cub's sibling dies not long afterward. The surviving cub grows up to become the Mountain Lord.

In the present time, Seok loves a girl in town, and secretly joins one of Gu-kyung's hunts in aspiration of earning a bounty sufficient to convince her father to allow them to marry; during the hunt, the Mountain Lord killed all the rioters whose intentions were to lure him out of hiding. When confronted as the last man standing, Seok wounds the Mountain Lord but is himself mortally wounded. The Mountain Lord brings Seok's body to Man-duk's cabin after having fought off a pack of wolves who dragged Seok to their den to feast on his remains.

After several failures, mounting hunter deaths, and the onset of a harsh winter, soldiers of the Imperial Japanese Army are dispatched to participate in escalating efforts to find and kill the Mountain Lord, and several attempts are made to enlist Man-duk to facilitate the hunt, all of which he resolutely resists.

However, following Seok's death and the wounding of the Mountain Lord, hunter and tiger, now both bereft of mates and offspring, each tread fatefully toward the snow-blasted mountain top, with the bounty hunters and army in close pursuit. Man-duk reaches the top of the mountain and waits for the Mountain Lord. Soon following, the Mountain Lord appears and charges Man-duk, but does not pounce as he fires. Man-duk sadly asks the Mountain Lord why he "stopped," and proceeds to take out a hunting knife at the mountain's edge. The Mountain Lord eventually pounces at him, and they both fall off the mountain together to their deaths. The governor-general asks the hunters what happened after the incident, and they relate to him a story about the Mountain Lord becoming a god. The governor-general comes to the conclusion that his army is unable to fight during the looming winter and has decided to withdraw until the next spring.

The film ends with flashbacks of Man-duk's and the Mountain Lord's early lives during happier times, returning to the present afterward as evening snow falls, covering their lifeless bodies, which lay side by side, locked in an eternal embrace.

== Cast ==
- Choi Min-sik - Chun Man-Duk
- Jung Man-sik - Goo-Gyeong
- Kim Sang-ho - Chil-Goo
- Sung Yu-bin - Suk-Yi (Man-Duk's son)
- Ren Osugi - Japanese High Government Official Maezono
- Jung Suk-won - Japanese Military Officer Ryu
- Ra Mi-ran - Chil-Goo's wife
- Kim Hong-pa - herbal shop owner (Man-Duk's friend)
- Park Ji-hwan - hunter Hwan
- Woo Jung-kook - Member of Joseon Hunter Team
- Park In-soo - Member of Joseon Hunter Team
- Lee Na-ra - Mal-Nyeon (Man-Duk's wife)
- Hyun Seung-min - Sun-Yi (Chil-Goo's daughter)

== Reception ==
The film grossed US$2.67 million during its second weekend in South Korea. It grossed US$9,341,588 with 1,584,170 moviegoers in South Korea.

== Critical response ==
On Rotten Tomatoes, the film has an approval rating of 100% based on seven reviews. Critic James Mudge writes that, despite not meeting box office expectations, "The Tiger: An Old Hunter's Tale is easily one of the best Korean films of the last year, and a winning marriage of the breathtakingly grand and the quietly philosophical." Chris Sawin writes, "The Tiger is beautifully shot with an exceptional performance from the impeccable Choi Min-sik. Director Park Hoon-jung has masterfully crafted a face-off between two formidable opponents with a heartfelt history that digs deep."

== Accolades ==
| Year | Award | Category | Recipient | Result |
|---|---|---|---|---|
| 2016 | 21st Chunsa Film Art Awards | Best Actor | Choi Min-sik | Nominated |
| 2016 | 21st Chunsa Film Art Awards | Technical Award | Jo Yong-suk (Visual Effects) | Won |
| 2016 | 36th Korea Gold Awards Festival | Grand Prize (Daesang) | The Tiger: An Old Hunter's Tale | Won |
| 2016 | 36th Korea Gold Awards Festival | Best Director | Park Hoon-jung | Won |
| 2016 | 36th Korea Gold Awards Festival | Special Jury Prize | Jung Man-sik | Won |
| 2016 | 10th Asian Film Awards | Best Visual Effects | Jo Yong-suk, Choi Jae-chun, Lee Jeon-hyung | Nominated |
| 2016 | 53rd Grand Bell Awards | Best Film | The Tiger: An Old Hunter's Tale | Nominated |
| 2016 | 53rd Grand Bell Awards | Best Actor | Choi Min-sik | Nominated |
| 2016 | 53rd Grand Bell Awards | Best Screenplay | Park Hoon-jung | Nominated |
| 2016 | 53rd Grand Bell Awards | Best Art Direction | Cho Hwa-sung | Nominated |
| 2016 | 53rd Grand Bell Awards | Best Costume Design | Jo Sang-kyung | Nominated |
| 2016 | 53rd Grand Bell Awards | High Technology Special Award | Jo Yong-suk, Hwang Hyo-kyun, Kwak Tae-yong, Kim Tae-eui | Won |
| 2016 | 53rd Grand Bell Awards | Best Sound Recording | Rob Nokes | Nominated |
| 2016 | Golden Cinematography Awards | Best Film | The Tiger: An Old Hunter's Tale | Won |
| 2016 | Golden Cinematography Awards | Best Director | Park Hoon-jung | Won |

== See also ==
- The Hunter (2011 Australian film)
