= 50th Grand Bell Awards =

2013 edition of award ceremony

- Official poster
- Date: November 1, 2013
- Site: KBS Hall in Yeouido, Seoul
- Hosted by: Shin Hyun-joon; Ha Ji-won

Television coverage
- Network: KBS2

The 50th Grand Bell Awards (Korean: 대종상 영화제; RR: Daejongsang Yeonghwajae), also known as Daejong Film Awards, are determined and presented annually by The Motion Pictures Association of Korea for excellence in film in South Korea. The Grand Bell Awards were first presented in 1962 and have gained prestige as the Korean equivalent of the American Academy Awards.

== 50th ceremony ==
The 50th Grand Bell Awards ceremony was held at the KBS Hall in Yeouido, Seoul on November 1, 2013 and hosted by Shin Hyun-joon and Ha Ji-won.

== Nominations and winners ==
(Winners denoted in bold)

Best Film	Best Director
**The Face Reader**; Snowpiercer; Miracle in Cell No. 7; New World; Boomerang Family	**Han Jae-rim** - **The Face Reader**; Bong Joon-ho - Snowpiercer; Lee Hwan-kyung - Miracle in Cell No. 7; Park Hoon-jung - New World; Song Hae-sung - Boomerang Family
Best Actor	Best Actress
**Ryu Seung-ryong** - **Miracle in Cell No. 7**; **Song Kang-ho** - **The Face Reader**; Hwang Jung-min - Fists of Legend; Hwang Jung-min - New World; Lee Jung-jae - The Face Reader	**Uhm Jung-hwa** - **Montage**; Jang Young-nam - Azooma; Kal So-won - Miracle in Cell No. 7; Moon Jeong-hee - Hide and Seek; Youn Yuh-jung - Boomerang Family
Best Supporting Actor	Best Supporting Actress
**Jo Jung-suk** - **The Face Reader**; Baek Yoon-sik - The Face Reader; Oh Dal-su - Miracle in Cell No. 7; Park Sung-woong - New World; Yoo Jun-sang - Fists of Legend	**Jang Young-nam** - **A Werewolf Boy**; Go Ah-sung - Snowpiercer; Jin Ji-hee - Boomerang Family; Park Min-ha - The Flu; Uhm Ji-won - Man on the Edge
Best New Actor	Best New Actress
**Kim Soo-hyun** - **Secretly, Greatly**; Hong Wan-pyo - Cheer Up, Mr. Lee; Park Doo-sik - Fists of Legend; Park Jung-min - Fists of Legend; Park Si-hoo - Confession of Murder	**Seo Eun-ah** - **Act**; Chun Min-hee - Man on the Edge; Kal So-won - Miracle in Cell No. 7; Min Ji-hyun - Norigae; Shin So-yul - Whatcha Wearin'?
Best New Director	Best Screenplay
**Jung Byung-gil** - **Confession of Murder**; Huh Jung - Hide and Seek; Jeong Keun-seob - Montage; Jo Sung-hee - A Werewolf Boy; Lee Byeong-heon - Cheer Up, Mr. Lee	**Lee Hwan-kyung** - **Miracle in Cell No. 7**; Bong Joon-ho, Kelly Masterson - Snowpiercer; Jeong Keun-seob - Montage; Kim Dong-hyuk - The Face Reader; Park Hoon-jung - New World
Best Cinematography	Best Editing
**Choi Young-hwan** - **The Berlin File**; Go Nak-seon - The Face Reader; Hong Kyung-pyo - Snowpiercer; Kang Seung-gi - Miracle in Cell No. 7; Kim Ki-tae - Confession of Murder	**Steve M. Choe, Kim Chang-ju** - **Snowpiercer**; Choi Jae-geun, Kim So-yeon - Miracle in Cell No. 7; Kim Chang-ju - The Face Reader; Kim Sang-bum - The Berlin File; Nam Na-yeong - Confession of Murder
Best Art Direction	Best Lighting
**Ondrej Nekvasil** - **Snowpiercer**; Cho Hwa-sung - New World; Jeon Soo-ah - The Berlin File; Lee Ha-jun - The Face Reader; Lee Hoo-gyoung - Miracle in Cell No. 7	**Kim Sung-kwan** - **The Berlin File**; Bae Il-hyuk - New World; Kang Dae-hee - Fists of Legend; Kang Sung-hoon - Miracle in Cell No. 7; Shin Kyung-man, Lee Cheol-oh - The Face Reader
Best Costume Design	Best Music
**Shim Hyun-sub** - **The Face Reader**; Catherine George - Snowpiercer; Jo Sang-gyeong - Cold Eyes; Kim Na-yeon - Miracle in Cell No. 7; Shin Ji-young - The Berlin File	**Jo Yeong-wook** - **New World**; Jo Yeong-wook - Hide and Seek; Lee Byung-woo - The Face Reader; Lee Dong-jun - Miracle in Cell No. 7; Marco Beltrami - Snowpiercer
Technical Award	Best Planning
**Digital Idea** - **The Tower (Visual Effects)**; Flash Barrandov SFX - Snowpiercer (Special Effects); Kwak Tae-yong, Hwang Hyo-kyun - The Face Reader (Special Make-up); Im Dae-ji, Choi Tae-young - The Face Reader (Sound)	**Kim Min-ki, Lee Hwan-kyung, Kim Min-guk** - **Miracle in Cell No. 7**
Best Short Film	Special Jury Prize
**Adultery**	**Kal So-won** - **Miracle in Cell No. 7**
Popularity Award	Lifetime Achievement Award
**Lee Jung-jae** - **The Face Reader**	**Hwang Jeong-sun** (Actress); **Jung Il-sung** (Cinematographer)
