= Kim Chang-ju (film editor) =

South Korean film editor and director

- Born: 1972 (age 53–54)
- Occupations: Film editor, Film director
- Years active: 2005–present
- Awards: Grand Bell Awards; Blue Dragon Film Awards

Korean name
- Hangul: 김창주
- RR: Gim Changju
- MR: Kim Ch'angju

Kim Chang-ju (Korean: 김창주; born 1972) is a South Korean film editor and director. He started working in editing department of 2005 film Welcome to Dongmakgol. He edited films with directors Bong Joon-ho (Snowpiercer (2013)), Kim Seong-hun (A Hard Day (2014) and Tunnel (2016)), Park Hee-gon (Fengshui), Park Hoon-jung (V.I.P. (2017), The Witch: Part 1. The Subversion (2018)) and Cheon Myeong-kwan (Hot Blooded (2022)) among others. As of May 2022, Kim has edited more than 60 films and 2 TV series Athena: Goddess of War (2010), Kingdom (2019–20). Kim made his directorial debut in 2021 thriller film Hard Hit.

He has won Grand Bell Awards and Blue Dragon Film Awards for Best Editing for films Snowpiercer (2013) and A Hard Day (2014) respectively.

== Filmography ==
=== As director ===
Film credits as director
Year	Title		Cast	Notes	Ref(s)
Year	English	Korean	Cast	Notes	Ref(s)
2021	Hard Hit	발신제한	Jo Woo-jin, Lee Jae-in, Ji Chang-wook	Also editor	
2024	Amazon Bullseye	아마존 활명수	Ryu Seung-ryong, Jin Seon-kyu, Yeom Hye-ran, Go Kyung-pyo	Also editor	

=== As editor and in editing department ===
Film credits as editor and in editing department
Year	Title		Director	DoP	Notes
Year	English	Korean	Director	DoP	Notes
2005	Welcome to Dongmakgol	웰컴 투 동막골	Park Kwang-hyun	In editing department	
2006	Forbidden Quest	음란서생	Kim Dae-woo	Co-editor	
2006	Bewitching Attraction	여교수의 은밀한 매력	Lee Ha	Co-editor	
2006	For Horowitz	호로비츠를 위하여	Kwon Hyung-jin	Co-editor	
2006	Fly, Daddy, Fly	플라이 대디	Choi Jong Tae		
2006	Heart Is...	마음이	Park Eun-hyung		
2007	Wide Awake	리턴	Lee Gyu-man	Co-editor	
2009	Marine Boy	마린보이	Yoon Jong-seok	Co-editor	
2010	Happy Killers	반가운 살인자	Kim Dong-wook	Co-editor	
2010	71: Into the Fire	포화 속으로	John H. Lee	Co-editor	
2010	Natalie	나탈리	Ju Kyung-jung	Co-editor	
2010	Athena: Goddess of War	아테나: 전쟁의 여신	Kim Myung-jun	Co-editor for TV series	
2011	Children	아이들	Lee Gyu-man		
2011	War of the Arrows	최종병기 활	Kim Han-min	Co-editor	
2011	Perfect Game	퍼펙트 게임	Park Hee-gon		
2012	I Am	아이엠	Choi Jin-sung		
2012	The Spies	간첩	Woo Min-ho		
2012	Ghost Sweepers	점쟁이들	Shin Jung-won		
2013	How to Use Guys with Secret Tips	남자사용설명서	Lee Won-suk		
2013	The Terror Live	더 테러 라이브	Kim Byung-woo		
2013	Snowpiercer	설국열차	Bong Joon-ho	Co-editor	
2013	The Face Reader	관상	Han Jae-rim		
2013	The Five	더 파이브	Jeong Yeon-shik	Co-editor	
2014	The Target	표적	Chang		
2014	A Hard Day	끝까지 간다	Kim Seong-hun		
2014	For the Emperor	황제를 위하여	Park Sang-jun		
2014	Mourning Grave	소녀괴담	Oh In-chun	Co-editor	
2014	The Admiral: Roaring Currents	명량	Kim Han-min		
2014	My Brilliant Life	두근두근 내 인생	E J-yong		
2015	Shoot Me in the Heart	내 심장을 쏴라	Mun Che-yong		
2015	The Silenced	경성학교: 사라진 소녀들	Lee Hae-young		
2015	The Classified File	극비수사	Kwak Kyung-taek		
2015	The Piper	손님	Kim Gwang-tae		
2015	The Long Way Home	서부전선	Cheon Sung-il		
2015	The Exclusive: Beat the Devil's Tattoo	특종: 량첸살인기	Roh Deok		
2015	The Tiger: An Old Hunter's Tale	대호	Park Hoon-jung		
2016	Mood of the Day	그날의 분위기	Jo Kyu-jang		
2016	My New Sassy Girl	엽기적인 그녀 2	Joh Keun-shik		
2016	Canola	계춘할망	Chang		
2016	Bling		Kyung Ho Lee	Animation	
2016	Tunnel	터널	Kim Seong-hun		
2016	Vanishing Time: A Boy Who Returned	가려진 시간	Um Tae-hwa		
2016	Will You Be There?	당신, 거기 있어줄래요	Hong Ji-young	Co-editor	
2017	Because I Love You	사랑하기 때문에	Joo Ji-hoong		
2017	The Prison	프리즌	Na Hyun		
2017	The Mayor	특별시민	Park In-je		
2017	Real	리얼	Lee Sa-rang		
2017	Midnight Runners	청년경찰	Jason Kim		
2017	V.I.P.	브이아이피	Park Hoon-jung		
2017	RV: Resurrected Victims	희생부활자	Kwak Kyung-taek		
2017	Man of Will	대장 김창수	Lee Won-tae		
2018	Heung-boo: The Revolutionist	흥부: 글로 세상을 바꾼 자	Cho Geun-hyun		
2018	Champion	챔피언	Kim Yong-wan	Co-editor	
2018	The Witch: Part 1. The Subversion	마녀	Park Hoon-jung		
2018	Fengshui	명당	Park Hee-gon		
2018	The Great Battle	안시성	Kim Kwang-sik		
2018	Take Point	더 벙커	Kim Byung-woo		
2019-20	Kingdom	킹덤	Kim Seong-hun	TV series Season 1, 2	
2019	Juror 8	배심원들	Hong Seung-wan		
2019	The Battle of Jangsari	장사리: 잊혀진 영웅들	Kwak Kyung-taek		
2019	Bring Me Home	나를 찾아줘	Kim Seung-woo		
2020	Hitman: Agent Jun	히트맨	Choi Won-sub		
2020	Intruder	침입자	Sohn Won-pyung		
2020	The Golden Holiday	국제수사	Kim Bong-Han		
2021	Hostage: Missing Celebrity	인질	Pil Kam-sung		
2022	The Pirates: The Last Royal Treasure	해적: 도깨비 깃발	Kim Jeong-hoon		
2022	Hot Blooded	뜨거운 피	Cheon Myeong-kwan		
2022	6/45	육사오	Park Gyu-tae		
2022	Decibel	데시벨	Hwang In-ho		
2023	Ransomed	비공식작전	Kim Seong-hun		

== Awards and nominations ==
Year	Awards	Category	Work	Result	Ref.
2013	Asia-Pacific Film Festival	Best Editing	Snowpiercer	Nominated	
2013	50th Grand Bell Awards	Best Editing	Snowpiercer	Won	
2014	51st Grand Bell Awards	Best Editing	A Hard Day	Nominated	
2014	1st Korean Film Producers Association Awards	Best Editing	A Hard Day	Won	
2014	35th Blue Dragon Film Awards	Best Editing	A Hard Day	Won	
2015	9th Asian Film Awards	Best Editing	A Hard Day	Nominated	
2021	42nd Blue Dragon Film Awards	Best Editing Award	Hostage: Missing Celebrity	Nominated	
2021	42nd Blue Dragon Film Awards	Best Editing Award	Hard Hit	Nominated	
2021	42nd Blue Dragon Film Awards	Best New Director	Hard Hit	Nominated	
2022	58th Baeksang Arts Awards	Best New Director	Hard Hit	Nominated	
