= V.I.P. (2017 film) =

2017 South Korean noir, thriller film directed by Park Hoon-jung

- Theatrical release poster
- Hangul: 브이아이피
- RR: Beuiaipi
- MR: Pŭiaip'i
- Directed by: Park Hoon-jung
- Written by: Park Hoon-jung
- Produced by: Yeon Young-sik
- Starring: Jang Dong-gun; Kim Myung-min; Park Hee-soon; Lee Jong-suk
- Cinematography: Kim Young-ho
- Edited by: Kim Chang-ju
- Music by: Mowg
- Production companies: Peppermint & Company
- Distributed by: Warner Bros. Pictures
- Release date: August 23, 2017
- Running time: 128 minutes
- Country: South Korea
- Language: Korean
- Box office: $9.7 million

V.I.P. (Korean: 브이아이피; RR: Beuiaipi) is a 2017 South Korean action thriller film directed by Park Hoon-jung and starring Jang Dong-gun, Kim Myung-min, Park Hee-soon and Lee Jong-suk. In the film, officers from South Korea, North Korea and Interpol chase after a serial killer suspect.

The film was released on August 23, 2017. The reception was largely negative, with criticism directed mainly towards the portrayal of graphic violence towards a female character. The film was later released on DVD and Blu-ray formats on 7 March 2018.

== Plot ==
In 2008, in Sinuiju, North Korea, a young girl is abducted by Kim Gwang-il, the son of a high-ranking official, and his associates. After torturing and murdering the girl and her family, Gwang-il becomes the prime suspect in a series of similar crimes. However, Lee Dae-bum, an investigator with the Ministry of Social Security, is prevented from investigating the case and is demoted. When Gwang-il subsequently attacks Lee and his subordinates, Lee is forced to flee to South Korea.

In 2011, a series of murders involving female victims strangled with piano wire takes place in South Korea. Detective Chae Yi-do, who has recently returned to active duty following disciplinary action for excessive use of force, takes charge of the investigation. After forensic evidence links Gwang-il to the murders, Chae moves to arrest him. However, the National Intelligence Service (NIS), led by agent Park Jae-hyuk, also seeks custody of Gwang-il, who possesses information about secret bank accounts previously managed by his father, a former associate of Jang Song-thaek. Park attempts to secure Gwang-il's transfer to American custody through CIA officer Paul Gray.

Despite the NIS's efforts, Chae obtains an arrest warrant and takes Gwang-il into police custody. He eventually establishes Gwang-il's involvement in the murders through surveillance footage. Meanwhile, Lee approaches Chae and reveals his past with Gwang-il, offering evidence of another murder committed in Hong Kong in exchange for custody of the suspect. The footage confirms Gwang-il's involvement in the killing of a South Korean student, strengthening Chae's case against him.

As the NIS and CIA attempt to take Gwang-il into their custody, Chae confronts them with the new evidence. He subsequently takes Gwang-il to the police station, only to discover that the investigation has been shut down through interference from higher authorities. With the prosecution also refusing to proceed, Chae reluctantly agrees to hand Gwang-il over to the CIA. During the transfer, Gwang-il shoots Chae and escapes with Gray, but Lee intercepts their vehicle and takes Gwang-il away.

Park later learns that Gwang-il has killed Lee and escaped. Chae survives the shooting but falls into a coma, while Park visits him in hospital.

In 2013, Park travels to Hong Kong, where Gwang-il is being protected by North Korean agents. Park eliminates the guards and confronts Gwang-il, who offers to disclose the information he possesses in exchange for his life. Park kills him instead and presents his severed head to Gray. He reveals that the secret bank accounts had already been emptied, rendering Gwang-il's information worthless. After confronting Gray, Park leaves Hong Kong. Chae remains in a coma five years after the shooting.

== Cast ==
- Jang Dong-gun as Park Jae-hyuk, an NIS agent
- Kim Myung-min as Chae Yi-do, a police detective who leads a serial murder case
- Park Hee-soon as Lee Dae-bum, a North Korean police officer who secretly crosses the border into the South to track down Kim Gwang-il
- Lee Jong-suk as Kim Gwang-il, a key North Korean political figure's son who receives VIP treatment after his defection to South Korea, organised by the Central Intelligence Agency (CIA). He becomes a prime suspect for a serial murder case.
- Peter Stormare as Paul Gray, a CIA agent
- Oh Dae-hwan as Detective Kim
- Tae In-ho as Tae Yo-won
- Yoo Jae-myung as North Korean security official
- Park Sung-woong as NIS agent
- Jo Woo-jin as prosecutor
- Lee Seo-joon as Gwang-il's minion 1
- Byun Seong-beom as Gwang-il's minion 2
- Lee Jung-hyuk as Gwang-il's minion 3

== Production ==
Filming began on October 22, 2016, and ended on January 22, 2017. Filming took place in South Korea, Hong Kong, Thailand and other countries.

== Release ==
The cast of V.I.P was invited to the 74th Venice International Film Festival which began on August 30, 2017. However, the invitation was declined by the production company as the film's release could not be rescheduled to a later date.

The film was released in South Korean cinemas on August 23, 2017.

== Reception ==
=== Critical response ===
V.I.P was named as an R-rated crime film, which restricted audiences younger than eighteen years of age.

Many viewers criticized the film's depiction of violence against women. Some of the comments were regarding the film's unnecessary cruel and gruesome scenes, while others critiqued the use of female characters as devices of sexual violence to show the cruelty of male characters.

=== Box office ===
Upon its release in South Korean cinemas on August 23, 2017, V.I.P. hit the top spot, selling 174,022 ticket and earning a gross income of US$1.17 million on its opening day. During the first two days V.I.P sold 341,610 tickets earning US$2.3 million. After five days of its release the movie has attracted 940,359 audience screening in 966 venues.

According to the Korean Film Council V.I.P had surpassed 1 million viewers by August 29, in just seven days since its release, and the film earned a total gross income of US$7.8 million.

=== Accolades ===
Year	Award	Category	Recipient(s)	Result	Ref
2017	Fantastic Fest 2017	Best Director - Thriller Features	Park Hoon-jung	Won	
