= The Deal (2015 film) =

- Theatrical poster
- Directed by: Son Yong-ho
- Written by: An Young-jin
- Produced by: An Young-jin; Yoo Seung-young
- Starring: Kim Sang-kyung; Kim Sung-kyun; Park Sung-woong
- Cinematography: Lee Jong-youl
- Edited by: Shin Min-kyung
- Music by: Koo Ja-wa; Ahn Hyeon-jin
- Distributed by: Cine Guru/Kidari ENT
- Release date: March 12, 2015
- Running time: 103 minutes
- Country: South Korea
- Language: Korean
- Box office: US$6.2 million

The Deal (Korean: 살인의뢰; RR: Sarinuiroe; lit. 'Murder Request') is a 2015 South Korean crime thriller film directed by Son Yong-ho.

== Plot ==
Veteran detective Tae-soo figures out that the suspect in a hit-and-run case, Gang-chun, is a serial killer wanted for several murders. But not long after his victory, Tae-soo realizes that his younger sister Soo-kyung was Gang-chun's last victim. Gang-chun receives the death penalty, but refuses to reveal the whereabouts of the victims' bodies, leaving Tae-soo and his brother-in-law Seung-hyun devastated. Three years later, Tae-soo is investigating the murder of a gangster boss when to his surprise, he finds evidence that Seung-hyun is the prime suspect. As he digs deeper, Tae-soo learns that the gang's former boss is now in the same prison as Gang-chun, who is thriving and looking better than ever (South Korea hasn't carried out a single execution since 1997).

== Cast ==
- Kim Sang-kyung as Tae-soo
- Kim Sung-kyun as Seung-hyun
- Park Sung-woong as Gang-chun
- Jo Jae-yoon as Kim Ki-seok
- Kim Eui-sung as Son Myung-soo
- Gi Ju-bong as Subsection chief Choi
- Yoon Seung-ah as Soo-kyung
- Oh Dae-hwan as Kal-chi
- Hyun Sung as Detective Nam
- Ji Sang-hyuk as Detective Shin
- Choi Hyun-wook as Detective Park
- Lee Da-hee as Baby's mom
- Kim Young-jo as Deputy Kim
- Lee Sang-in as Eun-mi
- Song Young-chang as Judge (cameo)
- Im Jong-yoon as Kyung-sik (cameo)

== Box office ==
The Deal was released in South Korea on March 12, 2015. It opened at number one at the box office, grossing ₩4.11 billion (US$3.62 million) from 495,000 admissions over its first four days.

== Reception ==
With an IMDb rating of 6.1 / 10, and 59% of Google users said they liked the film, reviews for The Deal were mixed. The Hollywood Reporter called it a 'visually arresting debut in the crowded Korean thriller arena' while Screen Anarchy called it 'a serviceable but generic revenge thriller.' Asian Movie Web called the film a thriller which 'you don't have to watch, but which nonetheless will appease the hunger of genre-fans.'
