= Jang Gwang =

South Korean actor

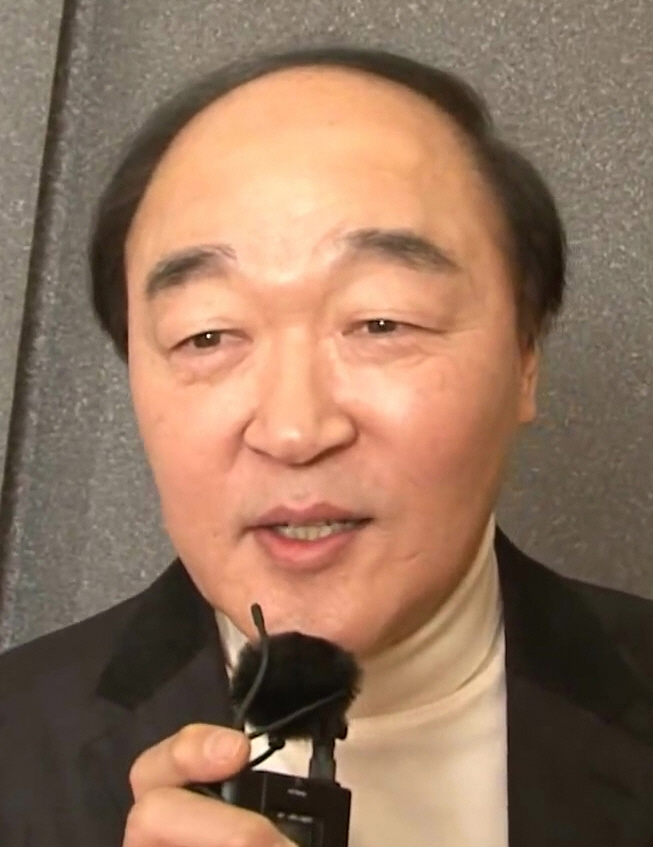
- Jang in 2015
- Born: January 5, 1952 (age 74); South Korea
- Occupation: Actor
- Years active: 1978–present
- Agent: Shin Entertainment
- Spouse: Jeon Seong-ae (전성애)
- Children: 2

Korean name
- Hangul: 장광
- Hanja: 張鑛
- RR: Jang Gwang
- MR: Chang Kwang
- Website: shinentertainment.com

Jang Gwang (born January 5, 1952) is a South Korean actor in film and television.

== Filmography ==
=== Film ===
- Taste of Horror – Gym for Residents (2023)
- Air Murder (2022)
- Sinkhole (2021)
- White Day: Broken Barrier (2021)
- 60 Days of Summer (2018)
- Stand by Me (2018)
- The Villagers (2018)
- The Negotiation (2018)
- The Great Battle (2018)
- Along With the Gods: The Two Worlds (2017)
- Roman Holiday (2017)
- Ordinary Person (2017)
- Turning Mecard W: The Revival of Black Mirror (2017)
- Will You Be There? (2016)
- Bad Guys Always Die (2015)
- Collective Invention (2015)
- Untouchable Lawman (2015)
- Minority Opinion (2015)
- The Treacherous (2015)
- Emperor's Holidays (2015)
- Chronicle of a Blood Merchant (2015)
- Whistle Blower (2014) (cameo)
- The Road to Life (2014)
- Tabloid Truth (2014) (cameo)
- Miss Granny (2014) (cameo)
- The Plan Man (2014)
- Way Back Home (2013) (cameo)
- Marriage Blue (2013) (cameo)
- Iron Man 3 (2013) (Korean dubbing)
- Are You Ready? (2013) (documentary narrator)
- Secretly, Greatly (2013)
- New World (2013)
- The Snow Queen (2013)
- 26 Years (2012)
- Tone-deaf Clinic aka Love Clinique (2012)
- Confession of Murder (2012)
- Masquerade (2012)
- The Outback (2012) (Korean dubbing)
- Silenced (2011)
- Up (2009) (Korean dubbing)
- Whistling Princess (2002)
- Shrek (2001) (Korean dubbing)

=== Television ===
- Little Women (2022)
- Moonshine (2021–2022)
- Melancholia (2021)
- When My Love Blooms (2020)
- The Crowned Clown (2019)
- About Time (2018)
- Children of a Lesser God (2018)
- Queen of Mystery 2 (2018)
- Cross (2018)
- A Korean Odyssey (2017)
- Bad Thief, Good Thief (2017)
- Queen of Mystery (2017)
- Innocent Defendant (2017)
- Love in the Moonlight (2016)
- Memory (2016)
- Moorim School: Saga of the Brave (2016)
- Yong-pal (2015)
- Super Daddy Yeol (2015)
- Pinocchio (2014) (cameo, episode 2)
- You Are My Destiny (2014)
- Flower Grandpa Investigation Unit (2014)
- Gap-dong (2014)
- Goddess of Fire (2013)
- All About My Romance (2013)
- Bridal Mask (2012)
- Salamander Guru and The Shadows (2012)
- Ojakgyo Brothers (KBS1 / 2011)
- Vampire Prosecutor (2011)
- The Era of the Three Kims (1998)
- Fourth Republic (1995)
- Korea Gate (1995)

=== Web series ===
- Stock Struck (2022) - Kim Jin-bae
- Connect (2022) - doctor

=== Television shows ===
- Daughter Thieves (2022, cast member)

== State honors ==
Name of country, year given, and name of honor
Country	Organization	Year	Honor or Award	Ref.
South Korea	Korean Popular Culture and Arts Awards (Note: Honors are given at the Korean Popular Culture and Arts Awards, arranged by the Korea Creative Content Agency and hosted by the Ministry of Culture, Sports and Tourism. They are awarded to those who have contributed to the arts and South Korea's pop culture.)	2023	Prime Minister's Commendation	
