= Jung Man-sik =

South Korean actor (born 1974)

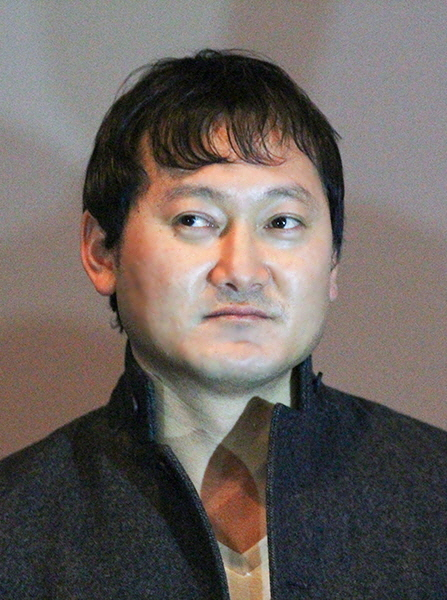
- Jung in 2013
- Born: December 11, 1974 (age 51); Mokpo, South Korea
- Occupation: Actor
- Agent: Big Friends

Korean name
- Hangul: 정만식
- RR: Jeong Mansik
- MR: Chŏng Mansik

Jung Man-sik (Korean: 정만식; born December 11, 1974) is a South Korean actor. His name is also romanized as Jeong Man-sik or Joung Man-sik.

== Filmography ==
=== Film ===
Year	Title	Role	Notes	Ref.
2001	Smells Like the Gun			
2005	She's on Duty	Mang-Chi	cameo	
2005	Princess Aurora	Detective Choi		
2006	No Mercy for the Rude			
2007	Soo			
2007	Paradise Murdered	Engineer Jo		
2007	Texture of Skin			
2008	Rough Cut	Detective		
2009	Breathless	Man-Sik		
2009	Paju			
2010	One Night Stand			
2010	Midnight FM	Oh Jung-mu		
2010	The Unjust	D.A. assistant Kong		
2010	Try to Remember	General Park		
2010	The Yellow Sea	Detective #1		
2010	Moby Dick	Nam Seon-soo		
2011	The Suicide Forecast	detective		
2011	S.I.U.	detective		
2011	Sorry and Thank You			
2011	Countdown	Department head Han		
2012	Wonderful Radio	Ja-Hyung		
2012	Over My Dead Body	Steve Jung		
2012	A Muse	CEO Park		
2012	The Spies	NIS section chief		
2013	Miracle in Cell No. 7	Shin Bong-sik		
2014	Man in Love	Doo-Chul		
2014	A Hard Day	Detective Choi		
2014	Kundo: Age of the Rampant	Butler Yang		
2014	The Con Artists			
2015	Granny's Got Talent	Seung-hyun		
2015	Chronicle of a Blood Merchant	Mr. Shim		
2015	The Treacherous	Assassin	cameo	
2015	Veteran	Manager Jeon		
2015	The Tiger: An Old Hunter's Tale	Goo-Gyeong		
2015	Inside Men	Choi Choong-sik		
2016	Asura: The City of Madnes	Do Chang-hak		
2016	My Little Brother	Oh Sung-ho		
2016	Ordinary Person	NSP Chief		
2017	The Sheriff in Town	Shin Il-sik		
2017	The Battleship Island	Sugiyama		
2017	Man of Will	Ma Sang-koo		
2018	Rampant	Hak-soo		
2018	Broker	Lee Do-hyun		
2019	Money	Deputy Department Head Byun		
2020	Beasts Clawing at Straws	Doo-man		
2020	Okay! Madam	Pilot		
2020	The Swordsman	Min Seung-ho		
2020	Jazzy Misfits	Choon-Bae		
2021	Escape from Mogadishu	Gong Soo-Cheol		
2022	Hunt	Agent Yang	Special appearance	
2022	Remember	Kang Young-sik		
2023	Hopeless	The owner of the Chinese restaurant		
2023	12.12: The Day	Major General Gong Soo-hyuk	Special appearance	
2024	Revolver	Jo Jae-hoon		
2024	Mission: Cross	Lee Sang-woong		
2025	Teaching Practice: Idiot Girls and School Ghost 2	Jeong-ah's Dad		

=== Television series ===
- Jungle Fish 2 (2010)
- Athena: Goddess of War (2010)
- The Greatest Love (2011)
- Drama Special "Lethal Move" (2011)
- Me Too, Flower! (2011)
- The King 2 Hearts (2012)
- Drama Special "The Great Dipper" (2012)
- The King of Dramas (2012)
- I Can Hear Your Voice (2013) (cameo, ep 18)
- Good Doctor (2013)
- Drama Festival "Principal Investigator - Save Wang Jo-hyun!" (2013)
- Glorious Day (2014)
- Local Hero (2016)
- Entertainer (2016)
- Man to Man (2017)
- Distorted (2017)
- Bad Papa (2018)
- Welcome to Waikiki 2 (2019) (cameo, ep 2)
- Vagabond (2019)
- Chief of Staff (2019)
- Dramaworld (2021) (season 2)
- Undercover (2021)
- Through the Darkness (2022) – Park Dae-woong (special appearance)
- Café Minamdang (KBS2, 2022) - Jang Doo-jin
- Insider (2022) – Yang-hwa
- A Bloody Lucky Day (2023)
- Good Boy (2025)
- Concrete Market (2025) – Park Sang-yong

=== Web series ===
- Concrete Market (TVING, 2022)
- My First Time (OnStyle, 2015)

=== Variety show ===
- Law of the Jungle in Costa Rica (SBS, 2014-2015)

=== Music video appearances ===
- NC.A - "My Student Teacher" (Lip Version) (2013)
- Park Soo-jin - "Fallin'" (2014)

== Awards ==
- 2004 Seoul Theater Festival: Award for Best Acting
- 2014 22nd Korea Culture and Entertainment Awards: Excellence Award, Actor in a Film (Kundo: Age of the Rampant)
