= Okay! Madam 2 =

2026 South Korean action comedy film

Okay! Madam 2 (Okay! Madam: Bon Voyage)
- Theatrical release poster
- Hangul: 오케이 마담2
- RR: Okei madam2
- MR: Ok'ei madam2
- Directed by: Lee Cheol-ha
- Written by: Cha Su-hyun
- Produced by: Kim Yoon-mi
- Starring: Uhm Jung-hwa; Park Sung-woong; Lee Sang-yoon; Bae Jung-nam; Park Jin-joo; Ryeoun; Choi Soo-young
- Cinematography: Park Jong-cheol; Eom Si-woo
- Edited by: Shin Min-kyung; Heo Ji-woon
- Music by: Dalpalan
- Production company: OAL
- Distributed by: CGV Pictures
- Release date: 12 August 2026
- Running time: 109 minutes
- Country: South Korea
- Language: Korean
- Box office: US$2.3 million

Okay! Madam 2, or internationally called Okay! Madam: Bon Voyage (Korean: 오케이 마담2), is a 2026 South Korean action comedy film directed by Lee Cheol-ha. It is a sequel to the 2020 film Okay! Madam, with Uhm Jung-hwa and Park Sung-woong reprising their roles as a couple whose wedding invitation to a luxury cruise turns into a dangerous mission to save their family.

Distributed by CJ CGV's newly founded film distribution subsidiary CGV Pictures, the film was released in South Korea on August 12, 2026.

== Synopsis ==
Mi‑young, a former agent facing family and financial troubles including conflict with her teen daughter, an unemployed husband, and the imminent bankruptcy of her donut shop, goes on a luxury cruise as an invitee to a wedding. The ship is hijacked by Anya, the boss of a criminal gang and her armed men. Trapped at sea, she is compelled to resume her former role as an operative and undertake a high risk mission aimed at safeguarding her family and stop the villains.

== Cast ==
- Uhm Jung-hwa as Lee Mi-young
- Park Sung-woong as Oh Suk-hwan
- Lee Sang-yoon as Lee Chul-seung
- Bae Jung-nam as Jung Hyun-min
- Park Jin-joo as Seon-ah, head of the cruise cabin team
- Ryeoun as Ji-hoon, magician
- Choi Soo-young as Anya, leader of a criminal organization

== Production ==
On June 19, 2024, it was reported that Uhm Jung-hwa had decided to reprise her role of Okay! Madam in a follow-up sequel film titled as Okay! Madam 2, which was in planning stage.

In November 2025, it was confirmed at the full script reading held on October 10, that new cast of Ryeoun, Choi Soo-young and Park Jin-joo had joined the old cast of the film.

On September 13, 2025 photo of filming set of cruise ship was revealed from Busan, South Korea.

Principal photography began on October 16. 2025. The filming was wrapped up on December 28, 2025 and post-production work was in progress.

== Release ==
Okay! Madam 2 was released in South Korean theaters by the distributor CGV Pictures on August 12, 2026 six years after the release of Okay! Madam, which was released on 12 August 2020.

The film was screened at the Busan Cinema Center, Busan by the Korean Film Council, Ministry of Culture, Sports and Tourism, and the Korea Copyright Commission to mark the 'Copyright Culture Day with Movies' on August 12, 2026.

== Reception ==
=== Box office ===
The film was released on 925 screens and registered the highest opening-day gross among Korean films with 42,931 viewers. In the overall box-office rankings, it placed fourth, with The Odyssey taking the top place during the same period.

As of August 30, 2026, the film has grossed US$2,284,722 from 334,907 admissions.

=== Critical response ===
Jang Ah-reum reviewing the film described it as "a classic piece of entertainment," praising the performances of Uhm Jung-hwa and Choi Soo-young for anchoring the story with charm and conviction. She noted that "the flow feels disjointed at the beginning" and that "the narrative density is somewhat less cohesive," but emphasized that the film compensates with an energetic blend of action, comedy, family drama, and espionage. Jang opined that the film ultimately pushes past its weaknesses through "a signature upbeat rhythm," delivering an experience designed less for narrative precision and more for sheer enjoyment. She concluded that the film puts importance to giving audiences two hours of laughter and lighthearted fun over achieving "narrative perfection."
