= Park Hee-soon =

South Korean actor (born 1970)

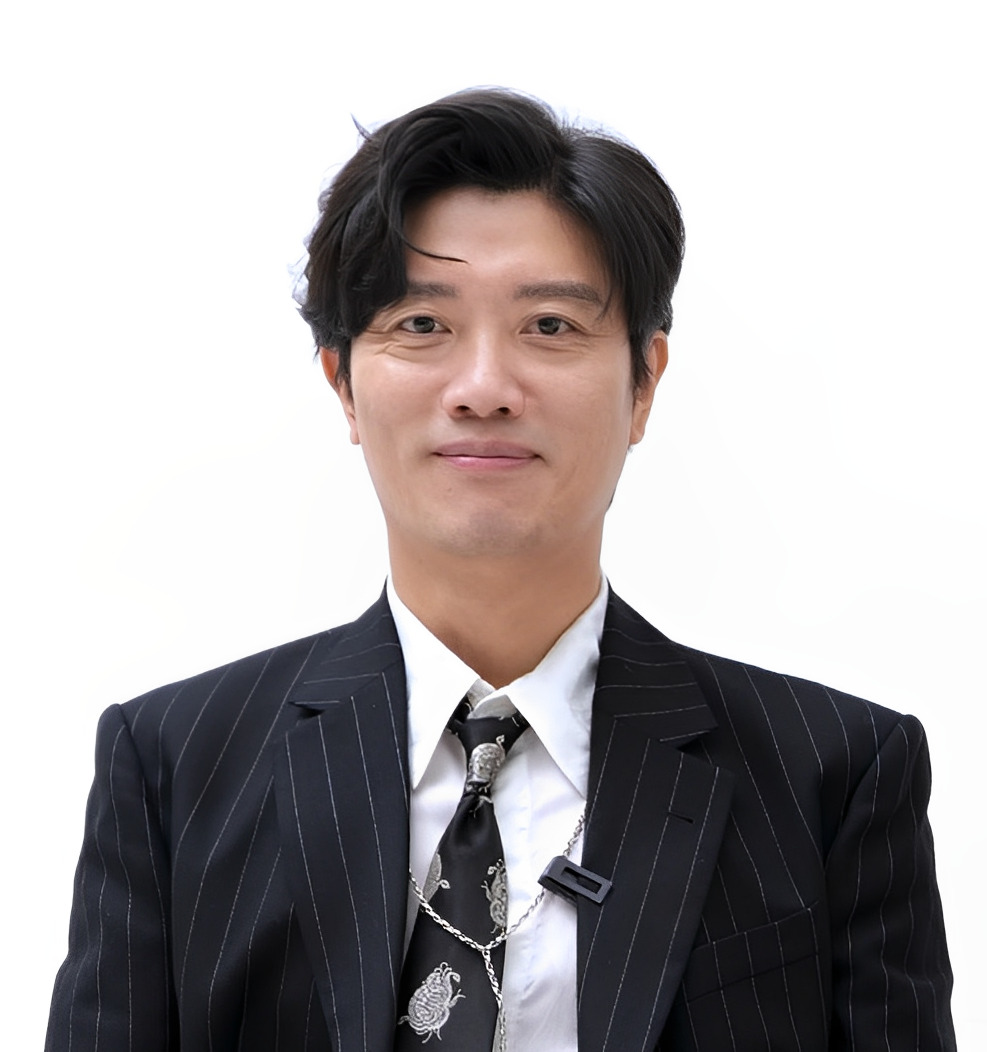
- Park in January 2023
- Born: February 13, 1970 (age 56); Seoul, South Korea
- Education: Seoul Institute of the Arts - Theater
- Occupation: Actor
- Years active: 1990–present
- Spouse: Park Ye-jin (m. 2015)

Korean name
- Hangul: 박희순
- Hanja: 朴熹詢
- RR: Bak Huisun
- MR: Pak Hŭisun

Park Hee-soon (Korean: 박희순; born February 13, 1970) is a South Korean actor. He graduated with a theater degree from Seoul Institute of the Arts, and was a member of the Mokwha Repertory Company from 1990 to 2001. He became active in film beginning in 2002, and won several Best Supporting Actor awards for his portrayal of a tough cop in Seven Days (2007). He received further acting recognitions for his roles in the films The Scam (2009) and 1987: When the Day Comes (2017). Apart from his film career, Park starred in television series All About My Romance (2013), The Missing (2015), Beautiful World (2019), and My Name (2021), the lattermost of which brought him international attention along with Squid Game (2024).

== Career ==
=== Early career in theater ===
Park was born on February 13, 1970. He graduated with a degree in theater from Seoul Institute of the Arts. Park began his acting career in 1990 when he joined the Mokwha Repertory Company. In 2001, after being a part of the troupe for 12 years, Park visited Oh Tae-seok, the representative and director of the troupe, and said, "I've been in Mokhwa for 12 years. I'll take a look around the outside world."

=== Chungmuro early career ===
Park appeared in minor roles in films as early as 1994, but he only became actively involved in film from 2001 onwards. Park decided to pursue a career in film for at least three years, but it was difficult for the rookie actor to establish himself in Chungmuro, the center of the South Korean film industry. However, step by step, Park built his career by appearing in minor roles in films such as "Three," "Box X Files," and "So Cute."

In 2004, Park played the role of a gang leader in the film "A Family," and his performance as the villain was highly praised. He was even nominated for Best New Actor at the 3rd Korean Film Awards for his role in the film.

In February 2005, Park made a comeback to the theater stage, appearing as Dan in the Aligator Theatre Company's Korean debut of the hit play "Closer" by Patrick Marber, which had been adapted into a film in 2004. The play was performed at The Seoul Art Center's Towol Theater.

Park costarred in Antarctic Journal. Park Hee-soon showed an impressive performance as a sober squad leader in the movie.

In the same year, Park got his first lead role in romantic comedy film Love Talk.

=== Established actor and venture to small screen ===
In 2007 he established himself as an indispensable acting actor in the film in Seven Days. Park won several Best Supporting Actor awards for his portrayal of a tough cop in Seven Days (2007). Park received the Best Actor Award at the Blue Dragon Film Awards and the Korea Film Awards, making a strong impression on the public and film officials. In the same year, He debuted on the small screen with KBS 2TV Drama City Reservoir. It was followed by his first miniseries Evasive Inquiry Agency.

In 2009, Park acted as Hwang Jong-gu, gangster-turned-financier, in Lee Ho-jae's film The Scam. The film was received well commercially. Park also garnered critical acclaim for his performance which earned Best Supporting Actor Awards from the 17th Chunsa Film Art Awards.

In 2010, Park acted as Kim Won-kang, a former football player who moved to East Timor in drama film A Barefoot Dream. It is based on the true story of Kim Shin-hwan, a retired Korean footballer who goes to East Timor after his business fails and launches a youth football team, thus becoming the "Hiddink of Korea." Directed by Kim Tae-kyun, this film was a co-production between South Korea and Japan.

In 2011, Park acted in Park Hoon-jung's debut film The Showdown. It was set in the 11th year of Gwanghaegun's reign, when Manchus invaded Joseon. Park acted as Heon-myung, Joseon military commander. He was one of three Joseon soldiers who were cornered by the Manchu forces and must fight a bloody battle in the middle of Manchuria.

In 2013, Park back to television after six years with SBS miniseries All About My Romance. Park also costarred in a 2013 South Korean action spy film The Suspect starring Gong Yoo, and directed by Won Shin-yun. Park's role was Min Se-hoon, a South Korean NIS operative demoted to drill sergeant after a failed mission where Ji Dong-cheol (played by Gong Yoo), spared him.

In 2014, Park came back onstage after nine years, for a 20th anniversary performance of Mokhwa. He performed in the play Baekma River in the Moonlight. It performed in Seoul Namsan Arts Drama Center from June 20 to July 6.

When you act, you act with sincerity. Authenticity is directly related to how much sweat and effort you put in for the role. How diligently I practiced for a role has been passed on since I was in a play, so I think a lot about that role and work hard in the movie. I tend to put in a lot of effort to bring the sincerity I learned from theater to film even when filming

— Park Hee-soon on his acting philosophy,

Park costarred in 2017 Korean political thriller film 1987: When the Day Comes directed by Jang Joon-hwan and written by Kim Kyung-chan, alongside Kim Yoon-seok, Ha Jung-woo, Yoo Hae-jin, Kim Tae-ri, and Lee Hee-joon. He acted as Lieutenant Jo Han-kyung and won Best Supporting Actor at 54th Baeksang Arts Awards. In the same year, Park reunited with director Park Hoon-jung in his 2017 crime-action thriller film V.I.P.. He acted as Ri Dae-bum, a North Korean police officer who secretly crosses the border into the South to track down Kim Kwang-il (played by Lee Jong-suk).

In 2018, Park played the role of Mr. Choi in science fiction action horror film "The Witch: Part 1. The Subversion," which was written and directed by Park Hoon-jung.

In 2021, Park joined My Name, Netflix original series directed by Kim Jin-min. He played Choi Mu-jin, the boss of Dongcheon who has described himself as a best friend and brother to Ji-woo's father. Mu-jin takes Ji-woo under his wing when she first joins his organization and teaches her how to fight. In the same year, Park acted alongside Lee Sun-kyun in Dr. Brain. Park portrays Kangmu Lee, a private investigator. Dr. Brain was the first Korean-language show produced for Apple TV+. The series marks the drama debut of renowned filmmaker Kim Jee-woon and is based on the Korean webtoon of the same name drawn by Hongjacga.

In 2022, Park costarred in Kim Jin-woo's Netflix original series A Model Family as Gwang-cheol.

== Personal life ==
=== Relationship and marriage ===
In 2011, it was reported that Park Hee-Soon and actress Park Ye-Jin were in a relationship. They met two years prior and got close due to friendship formed as artists under the same agency. In January 2016, it was reported that they registered their marriage in 2015. They had a small celebration with family and friends in 2016.

=== Tax audit ===
The Seoul Regional Tax Office investigated Park in 2024. In February 2025 outlets reported an additional assessment of about ₩800 million and described the reports as tax-evasion allegations. The Korea Herald wrote that Park ran a personal corporation—Twopark Playground, of which he is chief executive—while remaining with a management agency, an arrangement that allows entertainment income to be booked as corporate revenue. NS ENM denied evasion, saying Park had filed on a tax adviser's advice since his debut, that the issue arose in the tax process with the authorities and was not a failure of his legal duties as an actor, and that he had only objected at the preliminary-review stage, not completed an appeal. It said he was cooperating and expected the adjustment process to end soon.

== Philanthropy ==
In 2010, Park was involved in a charity project in Chad. It was to fulfill his promise to his best friend, the late Park Yong-ha. The school, named after Park, was founded on September 18, finally fulfilling Park's wish of helping to shape a brighter future for the children of Chad. It was documented by Hope TV, a special documentary revolving around this special school that was broadcast on October 22.

== Filmography ==
=== Film ===
Feature film performances
Year	Title		Role	Notes/Ref.
Year	English	Korean	Role	Notes/Ref.
1994	Sado Sade Impotence	우리시대의 사랑	Gu Sun-bok	
1994	2001 Imagine	2001 이매진	"John Lennon"	Short film
2002	Three	쓰리	Hyun-joo's husband	
2002	Boss X File	보스 상륙작전	saekki	
2003	So Cute	귀여워		
2004	A Family	가족	Chang-won	
2005	Antarctic Journal	남극일기	Lee Young-min	
2005	Love Talk	러브토크		
2007	Seven Days	세븐 데이즈	Kim Seong-yeol	
2007	Hansel and Gretel	헨젤과 그레텔	Deacon Byun	
2008	BA:BO	바보	Sang-soo	
2008	My Friend and His Wife	나의 친구, 그의 아내	Jae-moon	
2009	The Scam	작전	Hwang Jong-goo	
2009	Why Did You Come to My House?	우리집에 왜왔니	Kim Byeong-hee	
2009	A Million	10억	Jang Min-cheol	
2010	A Barefoot Dream	맨발의 꿈	Kim Won-gwang	
2011	The Showdown	혈투	Heon-myeong	
2011	The Client	의뢰인	Ahn Min-ho	
2012	Gabi	가비	King Gojong	
2012	The Scent	간기남	Kang Seon-woo	
2013	Burn, Release, Explode, the Invincible	연소, 석방, 폭발, 대적할 이가 없는		Short film
2013	Behind the Camera	뒷담화:감독이 미쳤어요	Park Hee-soon	
2013	You Are More Than Beautiful	그녀의 연기	Cheol-soo	Short film
2013	The Suspect	용의자	Min Se-hoon	
2016	Detour	올레	Soo-tak	
2016	The Age of Shadows	밀정	Kim Jang-ok	Special appearance
2017	V.I.P.	브이아이피	Ri Dae-bum	
2017	The Fortress	남한산성	Lee Shi-baek	
2017	1987: When the Day Comes	1987	Jo Ban-jang	
2018	Snatch Up	머니백	Detective Choi	
2018	The Witch: Part 1. The Subversion	마녀	Mr. Choi	
2018	Monstrum	물괴	King Jungjong	
2018	Revenger	리벤져	Carlos	
2018	My Dream Class	별리섬		
2019	The Battle: Roar to Victory	봉오동 전투	Captured Independence Soldier	Special appearance
2019	A Haunting Hitchhike	히치하이크	Hyung-woong	
2019	Sun-Kissed Family	썬키스 패밀리	Joon-ho	
2019	Jesters: The Game Changers	광대들: 풍문조작단	King Sejo	
2019	Bank of Seoul		Seong-jae	
2022	The Policeman's Lineage	경관의 피	Hwang In-ho	
2025	No Other Choice	어쩔수가없다	Choi Seon-chul	

=== Television ===
Television series performances
Year	Title		Role	Note	Ref.
Year	English	Korean	Role	Note	Ref.
2007	Drama City: "Reservoir"	드라마시티 - 저수지		Television Debut	
2007	Evasive Inquiry Agency	얼렁뚱땅 흥신소	Baek Min-cheol		
2013	All About My Romance	내 연애의 모든 것	Song Joon-ha		
2015	The Missing	실종느와르 M	Oh Dae-yeong		
2019	Beautiful World	아름다운 세상	Park Moo-jin		
2022	Trolley	트롤리	Nam Joong-do		
2026	The Judge Returns	판사 이한영	Kang Shin-jin		
TBA	Pigpen	돼지우리	Bae Jung-ho		

=== Web series ===
Web series performances
Year	Title		Role	Notes	Ref.
Year	English	Korean	Role	Notes	Ref.
2021	My Name	마이 네임	Choi Moo-jin	Netflix original series	
2021	Dr. Brain	Dr. 브레인	Lee Kang-moo	Apple TV+ original series	
2022	A Model Family	모범가족	Kwang-cheol	Netflix original series	
2023	Moving	무빙	Kim Deok-yun	Disney+ original series	
2024	The Bequeathed	선산	Choi Sung-joon	Netflix original series	
2024	Squid Game		Masked Officer		
2025	Confidence Queen	컨피던스 맨 KR	James	On Prime Video, September 6	

=== Music video appearances ===
Year	Title	Artist	Ref.
2010	"Bbi Ri Bba Bba" (삐리빠빠)	Narsha	
2025	"Dry Flower"	Kim Feel	
2025	"The Christmas Song" (신우석의 도시동화)	Byeon Woo-seok	
2026	"Human Extinction"	Woodz	

== Theater ==
=== Plays ===
Year	Title		Role	Theater	Notes	Ref.
Year	English	Korean	Role	Theater	Notes	Ref.
1991–1992	The Reason Shim Chung Threw Herself Into the Indang Sea Twice	심청이는 왜 두번 인당수에 몸을 던졌는가	Ensemble casts	Culture and Arts Hall small theater	September 14, 1991 – September 14, 1992	
1991–2000	This Love with a Fox	여우와 사랑을	Seo Kyung-soo	Theater Arungguji	December 10, 1999 – January 30, 2000	
1992	Intimacy Between Father and Son	부자유친	Seonhui Palace	Culture and Arts Hall Small Theater	July 1–16	
1994	Bellflower	(어른을 위한 동화) 도라지	Ensemble casts	Seoul Arts Center Jayu Small Theater	July 12–31	
1998	Birds Don't Use the Crosswalk	새들은 횡단보도를 건너지 않는다	Ensemble casts	Theater Arungguji	September 4 – October 18	
1998	The Island of Cheonmado - The Story of Kim Yushin	천마도 - 김유신 이야기	Ensemble casts	Literature Theater Small Theater	January 30 – February 11	
1998	Thousand years of water	천년의 수인(囚人)	Military Police	Dongsoong Art Center Dongsoong Hall	May 8 – June 14	
1999	Chunpung's Wife	춘풍의 처	Ensemble casts	Theater Arungguji	August 10 – October 3	
1999	23th Seoul Theater Festival — Kosovo and the wanderer	(제23회) 서울연극제 : 코소보 그리고 유랑	Ensemble casts	Theater Arungguji	October 1–17	
2001	Romeo and Juliet	로미오와 줄리엣	Ensemble casts	Theater Arungguji	May 10 – July 1	
2003	Art		Park Hee-soon	Seoul Arts Center Jayu Small Theater	February 1–23	
2004	Applause for Julie!	줄리에게 박수를	Hamlet	'Tree and Water' at Daehangno Arts Theater	March 25 – May 2	
2005	Closer	클로저	Dan	Seoul Arts Center Towol Theater	February 25 – March 13	
2014	In the moonlit night of Baekma River	백마강 달밤에	Park Soo-suk's shaman Yeong-deok	Namsan Arts Center Drama Center	June 25 – July 6	

=== Musicals ===
Year	Title		Role	Venue	Notes	Ref.
Year	English	Korean	Role	Venue	Notes	Ref.
2001	The Rocky Horror Show	록키호러쇼	Doctor Frankenfort	Polymedia Theater	December 8	
2003	Grease	그리스	Doody	Daegu Civic Center	December 20–21	

== Accolades ==
=== Awards and nominations ===
Year	Award	Category	Nominated work	Result	Ref.
2004	3rd Korean Film Awards	Best New Actor	A Family	Nominated	
2007	2007 KBS Drama Awards	Excellence Award, Actor in a One-Act/Special/Short Drama	Drama City - "The Reservoir"	Nominated	
2008	29th Blue Dragon Film Awards	Best Supporting Actor	Seven Days	Won	
2008	9th Busan Film Critics Awards	Best Supporting Actor	Seven Days	Won	
2008	7th Korean Film Awards	Best Supporting Actor	Seven Days	Won	
2008	4th University Film Festival of Korea	Best Supporting Actor	Seven Days	Won	
2008	17th Buil Film Awards	Best Supporting Actor	Seven Days	Nominated	
2009	17th Chunsa Film Art Awards	Best Supporting Actor	The Scam	Won	
2010	8th Korean Film Awards	Best Actor	A Barefoot Dream	Nominated	
2010	47th Grand Bell Awards	Best Actor	A Barefoot Dream	Nominated	
2010	31st Blue Dragon Film Awards	Best Leading Actor	A Barefoot Dream	Nominated	
2014	9th Max Movie Awards	Best Supporting Actor	The Suspect	Nominated	
2018	54th Baeksang Arts Awards	Best Supporting Actor (Film)	1987: When the Day Comes	Won	
2023	2023 SBS Drama Awards	Top Excellence Award, Actor in a Miniseries Romance/Comedy Drama	Trolley	Nominated	
2025	Korean Association of Film Critics Awards	Best Supporting Actor	No Other Choice	Won	
2026	Director's Cut Awards	Best New Actor (Film)	No Other Choice	Nominated	

=== Listicles ===
Name of publisher, year listed, name of listicle, and placement
Publisher	Year	Listicle	Placement	Ref.
Korean Film Council	2021	Korean Actors 200 (Note: Introduces 200 actors that best represent the present and future of Korean cinema to the people in the film industry all over the world.)	Included	
