= All About My Romance =

2013 South Korean television series

- Promotional poster
- Also known as: All About My Love; All About My Love Life; All About My Date
- Hangul: 내 연애의 모든것
- Hanja: 내 戀愛의 모든것
- RR: Nae yeonaeui modeungeot
- MR: Nae yŏnaeŭi modŭn'gŏt
- Genre: Romantic comedy Political
- Written by: Kwon Ki-young
- Directed by: Son Jung-hyun
- Starring: Shin Ha-kyun; Lee Min-jung; Park Hee-soon; Han Chae-ah
- Composer: Kim Hyeon-jong
- Country of origin: South Korea
- Original language: Korean
- No. of episodes: 16

Production
- Executive producer: Kim Young-seop
- Producers: Shin Bong-cheol; Lee Hee-soo
- Cinematography: Kim Hong-jae
- Editor: Kim Mi-gyeong
- Running time: 60 minutes
- Production companies: The Storyworks; SBS

Original release
- Network: SBS TV
- Release: April 4 – May 29, 2013

All About My Romance (Korean: 내 연애의 모든것; lit. 'Everything About My Relationship') is a 2013 South Korean television series starring Shin Ha-kyun, Lee Min-jung, Park Hee-soon and Han Chae-ah. It aired on SBS from April 4 to May 29, 2013, on Wednesdays and Thursdays at 21:55 (KST) for 16 episodes.

The political-romantic comedy series was written by Kwon Ki-young and directed by Son Jung-hyun, who previously worked together on Protect the Boss (2011).

== Cast ==
=== Main ===
- Shin Ha-kyun as Kim Soo-young

A legislator for the conservative New Korea Party. He is a newly elected member of the national assembly. Prior to that, he worked as a judge. But when the higher-ups began pressuring him for judicial favors, he decided to enter politics.

- Lee Min-jung as Noh Min-young

An assemblywoman for the Progressive Labor Party. She joined the world of politics after her older sister, a former presidential candidate, died.

- Park Hee-soon as Song Joon-ha

A prosecutor who becomes Min-young's aide. His brother is married to Min-young's sister.

- Han Chae-ah as Ahn Hee-sun

A news reporter from SeAh Daily Report. She went to the same law school as Soo-young and Joon-ha.

=== Supporting ===
==== Great Korea Party ====
- Jin Tae-hyun as Kim Sang-soo
- Chun Ho-jin as Go Dae-ryong
- Gong Hyung-jin as Moon Bong-shik
- Jang Gwang as Maeng Joo-ho
- Son Woo-hyuk as Park Bu-san

==== Green and Justice Party ====
- Min Ji-ah as Jung Yoon-hee
- Kim Jung-nan as Go Dong-sook
- Heo Jung-min as Seo Yoon-ki

==== Extended ====
- Jeon Min-seo as Song Bo-ri
- Kim Hye-ok as Na Young-sook
- Shin Young-jin as Noh Min-hwa

==== Cameo appearances ====
- Shin So-yul as a female student
- Park Eun-kyung as a radio DJ
- Ahn Nae-sang as Song Gyo-soo
- Park Young-ji as Chairman of SeAh Daily Report
- Pyeon Sang-wook as an SBS reporter
