= Kim Young-ho (cinematographer) =

South Korean cinematographer (born 1970)

- Born: 1970 (age 55–56); South Korea
- Education: Chung Ang University – Bachelor of Photography
- Occupation: Cinematographer
- Years active: 1996–present
- Organization: Cinematographers Guild of Korea
- Spouse: Undisclosed
- Children: 2

Korean name
- Hangul: 김영호
- Hanja: 金英浩
- RR: Gim Yeongho
- MR: Kim Yŏngho

Kim Young-ho (Korean: 김영호; born 1970) is a South Korean cinematographer. Kim's filmography spans a wide variety of genres, including epic period drama, comedy, science fiction, and contemporary drama. Kim pioneered the use of advanced filming techniques using Hollywood filming equipment to create stylish images that are hard to see in Korean films at that time.

Kim has collaborated with numerous well-known and acclaimed filmmakers, including Kim Sung-su, Kang Je-gyu, and Kim Yong-hwa. Kim is a frequent collaborator of director Park Hoon-jung, having worked together on numerous projects including the films The Showdown (2011), V.I.P. (2017), The Witch: Part 1. The Subversion (2018), Night in Paradise (2020), The Witch: Part 2. The Other One (2022), as well as Park's first OTT drama series The Tyrant (2024).

His best-known works include Kang Je-gyu's film Tidal Wave (2009), Won Shin-yun's film The Battle: Roar to Victory (2019).

== Career ==
=== 1996 to 2001: Early career, study in San Francisco ===
After graduating from the Department of Photography at Chung-Ang University, Kim began work on his first film in 1996 as a camera operator. Kim worked as a camera crew in films such as, Im Sang-soo's film Girls' Night Out, Min Byeong-cheon's film Phantom: The Submarine (1999) and Kim Sung-su's film Musa (2001). Despite having the opportunity to debut as a cinematographer, he chose to study at the Academy of Art University in San Francisco. This bold decision proved to be the foundation for his career. Studying abroad exposed him to the latest filming equipment in Hollywood and advanced filming techniques.

=== 2002 to present ===
After returning to South Korea, Kim made his debut as a cinematographer with Yoo Ha's film Marriage Is a Crazy Thing in 2002. He drew inspiration from films like The Thin Red Line (directed by Terrence Malick, cinematography by John Toll), Near Dark (directed by Kathryn Bigelow, cinematography by Adam Greenberg), La Haine (directed by Mathieu Kassovitz, cinematography by Pierre Aïm), Fargo (directed by the Coen Brothers, cinematography by Roger Deakins), and Alien 3 (directed by David Fincher, cinematography by Alex Thomson). He continued to hone his craft through projects like Father and Son: The Story of Mencius (2004, Kim Ji-young), Mr. Gam's Victory, and Hello, Brother.

In 2006, Kim's career reached new heights with his work on director Jo Dong-oh's film The Restless. He reunited with film crews of film Musa (2001), such as music director Shirō Sagisu. The film explores the concept of souls awaiting reincarnation for 49 days. Kim's expertise in CG and color correction in post-production was showcased in this project. In 2007, he won the bronze medal for Best Cinematography for The Restless at the 30th Golden Cinematography Awards.

Kim met lighting director Yang Woo-sang when he was working on Beat and has been working with him ever since. Mr. Gam's Victory, Hello, Brother, The Restless, and A Good Day to Have an Affair. His work in A Good Day to Have an Affair (2007, Jang Moon-il), and Harmony (2010, Kang Dae-gyu) further solidified his reputation as a leader in the industry.

His proficiency in filming scenes using CG was highlighted in Tidal Wave (2009, Yoon Je-kyoon), where he successfully integrated CG elements into large-scale settings like skyscrapers, Gwangan Bridge, and wide sandy beaches. Kim received the cinematography award at the 29th Film Critics Association and the 5th Korea University Film Festival.

Kim explained that making a 3D movie required specialized and expensive equipment like a "rigging system" to capture the left and right eye perspectives, a more complex and 30-day longer filming process, and about 30% higher production costs compared to 2D movies. He noted that South Korea's 3D filmmaking technology still lagged behind the United States, and it was "not easy to express a three-dimensional effect like Avatar", highlighting the significant technical challenges involved in achieving high-quality 3D results.

Kim joined director Jo Beom-gu's 2011 film Quick. He worked with producer Yoon Je-kyoon and special effects director Hong Jang-pyo. Kim, along with special effects director Jang-pyo, worked together on the film's action scenes, including creating high-speed video sequences at 300 km/h. The film's highway speed, chain collision, and explosion scenes were praised for pushing the boundaries of Korean cinema.

Kim joined director Oh Ki-hwan's Korean-Chinese co-production A Wedding Invitation (分手合约), which was released in China on April 12, 2013. The team included lighting director Hwang Soon-wook, music director Lee Ji-soo, and editor Shin Min-kyung. Malaysian Jeffrey Kong served as the art director.

In 2014, the film The Pirates was released. Kim collaborated on this project with director Lee Seok-hoon, scriptwriter Cheon Seong-il, martial arts director Ko Hyun-woong, art director Kim Ji-ah, costume designer Kwon Yoo-jin, VFX supervisor Kang Jong-ik, and music director Hwang Sang-joon, all of whom are top production staff members in the Korean film industry.

In 2014, Kim and Choi Young-hwan participated in the 3rd "Korean Director Showcase" in Beijing, China, organized by the Korean Film Council. The event aimed to promote Korean directors, cinematographers, and screenwriters in the Chinese film market and enhance Korea-China co-productions following a co-production agreement. Selected participants were highly recognized in China and chosen through a survey by major local production investment companies. During the event, they visited the China Film Business Center, a planning and development support center for Korea-China joint production films, and the Korea Film Council's 'China Film Business Center' to share information for Korean filmmakers and their entry into the Chinese market.

Kim was also the cinematographer for My Sister, the Pig Lady (2015).

On October 23, 2017, the Ministry of Culture, Sports and Tourism (Minister Do Jong-hwan) announced seven non-permanent members of the Korean Film Council: Now Film CEO Lee Jun-dong, producer Kang Won-sook, cinematographer Kim Young-ho, writer Kim Hyun-jung, director Mo Ji-eun, director Cho Young-gak of the Korean Independent Film Association, and professor Joo Yoo-shin of Busan Yeongsan University. Cinematographer Kim Young-ho was appointed upon recommendation by the Korean Cinematographer's Guild. They were responsible for comprehensively discussing and deciding on film-related policies, such as the establishment and implementation of the Basic Film Promotion Plan and the KOFIC Operation Plan, as well as the revision and abolition of the Articles of Incorporation, during their two-year term until October 2019.

Kim is a frequent collaborator of director Park Hoon-jung. He worked on Park's directorial debut The Showdown (2011), where he collaborated with costume designer Jeong Kyeong-hee and editor Shin Min-kyung. He also worked on VIP, where he collaborated with art director Cho Hwa-seong, costume director Cho Sang-gyeong, and makeup director Kwon Soo-gyeong. Kim was part of director Park Hoon-jung's The Witch franchise as well, working on The Witch: Part 1. The Subversion with art director Cho Hwa-seong, costume director Cho Sang-kyung, martial arts directors Park Jung-ryul and Kim Jung-min, and music director Mowg. In The Witch: Part 2. The Other One, he worked with art director Cho Hwa-seong, art director Choi Hyun-seok, music director Mowg, and action director Kim Jung-min. Kim also collaborated on Park Hoon-jung's Night in Paradise with art director Cho Hwa-seong. He joined Park's first OTT drama The Tyrant (2024).

One of his best-known works include Won Shin-yun's film The Battle: Roar to Victory (2019), where he also worked with art director Lee Jong-geon and martial arts director Kim Min-soo.

In 2022, Kim collaborated with director Jeon Woo-sung on the TVING original series Bargain.

In 2024, Kim served on a panel in Conjinwon-Netflix, Production Academy Program Operations.

== Filmography ==
=== Feature films ===
Feature film credit(s)
Year	Title		Credited as				Ref.
Year	English	Korea	Director	DoP	DoP Crew	Lighting	Ref.
1996	The Real Man	진짜 사나이	Park Heon-soo	—N/a	Yes	—N/a	
1996	The Adventure of Mrs. Park	박봉곤 가출사건	Kim Tae-kyun	—N/a	Yes	—N/a	
1997	Beat	비트	Kim Sung-su	—N/a	Yes	—N/a	
1998	Girls' Night Out	처녀들의 저녁식사	Im Sang-soo	—N/a	Yes	—N/a	
1999	Earnest Desire	절망	Lee Kyu-man	Yes	—N/a	—N/a	
1999	Phantom: The Submarine	유령	Min Byung-cheon	—N/a	Yes	—N/a	
1999	Eternity	영영	Kim Dae-hyun	—N/a	Yes	—N/a	
2001	Musa	무사	Kim Sung-su	—N/a	Yes	—N/a	
2002	The Name	The Name	Ryu Hoon	Yes	—N/a	Yes	
2002	Marriage Is a Crazy Thing	결혼은, 미친짓이다	Yoo-ha	Yes	—N/a		
2004	Father and Son: The Story of Mencius	맹부삼천지교	Kim Ji-young	Yes	—N/a		
2004	Mr. Gam's Victory	슈퍼스타 감사용	Kim Jong-hyun	Yes	—N/a		
2005	Hello, Brother	안녕, 형아	Lim Tae-hyung	Yes	—N/a		
2006	The Marshmallow Times	라즈베리 타임즈	Lee Seung-il, Hiroshi Fukutome	Yes	—N/a		
2007	The Restless	중천	Jo Dong-oh	Yes	—N/a		
2007	A Good Day to Have an Affair	바람피기 좋은 날	Jang Moon-il	—N/a	Yes	—N/a	
2007	Punch Lady	펀치 레이디	Kang Hyo-jin	Yes	—N/a		
2008	My New Partner	마이 뉴 파트너	Kim Jong-hyun	Yes	—N/a		
2009	Tidal Wave	해운대	Yoon Je-kyoon	Yes	—N/a		
2009	Harmony	하모니	Kang Dae-gyu	Yes	—N/a		
2010	The Showdown	혈투	Park Hoon-jung	Yes	—N/a		
2010	Encounter	조우	Im Tae-hyung	—N/a		Yes	
2011	Quick	퀵	Jo Beom-gu	Yes	—N/a		
2012	The Tower	타워	Kim Ji-hoon	Yes	—N/a		
2013	A Wedding Invitation	영화 이별계약 分手合约	Oh Ki-hwan	Yes	—N/a		
2013	Black Gospel	블랙 가스펠	hisMT Ministry	Yes	—N/a	Yes	
2014	Black Gospel 2: People I Met on a Journey to Find Souls	블랙 가스펠 2: 소울을 찾는 여정 가운데 만난 사람들	Kim Sung-kwon, Lee Im-ju	Yes	—N/a		
2014	The Pirates	해적: 바다로 간 산적	Lee Seok-hoon	Yes	—N/a		
2015	My Sister, the Pig Lady	돼지 같은 여자	Jang Moon-il	Yes	—N/a		
2016	Never Said Goodbye	시칠리아 햇빛아래	Lin Yu-hsien	Yes	—N/a		
2017	V.I.P.	브이아이피	Park Hoon-jung	Yes	—N/a		
2018	The Witch: Part 1. The Subversion	마녀	Park Hoon-jung	Yes	—N/a		
2019	Citizen Roh	시민 노무현	Baek Jae-ho	—N/a	Yes	—N/a	
2020	The Battle: Roar to Victory	봉오동 전투	Won Shin-yun	Yes	—N/a		
2020	Night in Paradise	낙원의 밤	Park Hoon-jung	Yes	—N/a		
2022	The Witch: Part 2. The Other One	마녀 Part2. The Other One	Park Hoon-jung	Yes	—N/a		
2022	The Pirates: The Last Royal Treasure	해적: 도깨비 깃발	Kim Jung-hoon	Yes	—N/a		
2023	The Moon	더 문	Kim Yong-hwa	Yes	—N/a	Yes	

=== Web series ===
Web series credit
Year	Title		Credited as			Ref.
Year	English	Korean	Director	DoP	DoP Team	Ref.
2022	Bargain	몸값	Jeon Woo-sung	Yes	—N/a	
2024	The Tyrant	폭군	Park Hoon-jung	Yes	—N/a	

== Accolades ==
=== Awards and nominations ===
Name of the award ceremony, year presented, category, nominee of the award, and the result of the nomination
Award ceremony	Year	Category	Nominee	Result	Ref.
56th Baeksang Arts Awards	2019	Technical Award	The Battle: Roar to Victory	Nominated	
30th Blue Dragon Film Awards	2009	Best Cinematography and Lighting	Tidal Wave	Nominated	
40th Blue Dragon Film Awards	2019	Best Cinematography and Lighting	The Battle: Roar to Victory	Nominated	
42nd Blue Dragon Film Awards	2020	Best Cinematography and Lighting	Night in Paradise	Nominated	
44th Blue Dragon Film Awards	2023	Best Cinematography and Lighting	The Moon; Kim Young-ho, Hwang Soon-wook	Nominated	
30th Buil Film Awards	2021	Best Cinematography	Night in Paradise	Nominated	
32nd Buil Film Awards	2023	Best Cinematography	The Moon	Nominated	
25th Chunsa Film Art Awards	2020	Best Technical	The Battle: Roar to Victory	Won	
30th Golden Cinema Film Festival	2007	Bronze Award for Best Cinematography	The Restless	Won	
41st Grand Bell Awards	2007	Best Cinematography	The Restless	Nominated	
51st Grand Bell Awards	2014	Best Cinematography	The Pirates	Nominated	
56th Grand Bell Awards	2020	Best Cinematography	The Battle: Roar to Victory	Won	
59th Grand Bell Awards	2023	Best Cinematography	The Moon	Nominated	
5th Korea University Film Festival	2009	Best Cinematography	Tidal Wave	Won	
29th Korean Association of Film Critics Awards	2009	Best Cinematography	Tidal Wave	Won	
6th Korean Film Producers Association Awards	2019	Best Cinematography	The Battle: Roar to Victory	Won	

=== Listicles ===
Name of publisher, year listed, name of listicle, and placement
Publisher	Year	Listicle	Placement	Ref.
Korean Cinematographers Guild	2018	21 Cinematographers with excellent cinematography	Placed	
