= Park Sung-woong =

South Korean actor

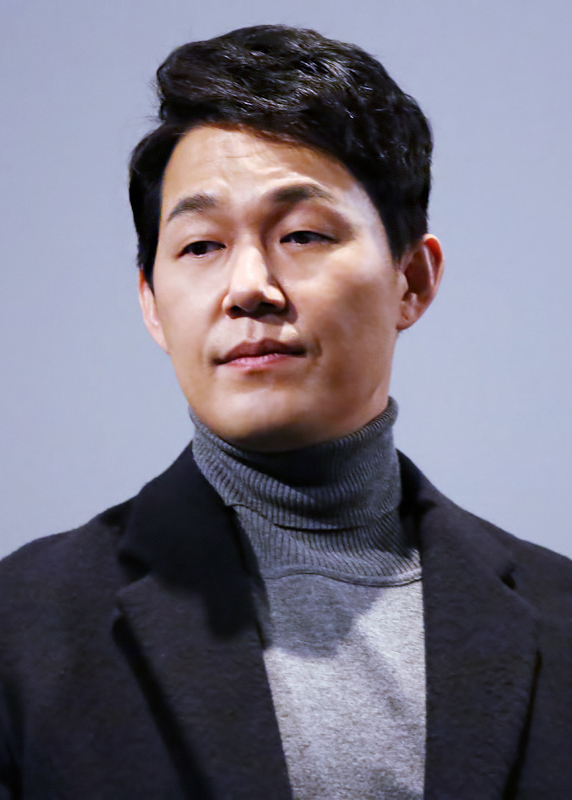
- Park in 2016
- Born: January 9, 1973 (age 53); Chungju, North Chungcheong Province, South Korea
- Education: Hankuk University of Foreign Studies - Law
- Occupation: Actor
- Years active: 1997–present
- Agents: Mask Entertainment; C-JeS Entertainment
- Spouse: Shin Eun-jung (m. 2008)
- Children: 1

Korean name
- Hangul: 박성웅
- Hanja: 朴星雄
- RR: Bak Seongung
- MR: Pak Sŏngung

Park Sung-woong (Korean: 박성웅; born January 9, 1973) is a South Korean actor. Following his acting debut in No. 3 in 1997, Park has starred in several movies and television series, notably as a gangster in New World (2013) and a serial killer in The Deal (2015).

== Career ==
In 2024, Park starred opposite Lee Joon-hyuk in the crime thriller legal television series Dongjae, the Good or the Bastard. The series is a spin-off of the Korean drama Stranger (2017).

== Personal life ==
Park married actress Shin Eun-jung on October 18, 2008. They met while filming The Legend (2007), in which the characters they played were lovers.

== Filmography ==
=== Film ===
Year	Title	Role	Notes	Ref.
1997	No. 3			
1998	Story of Man			
1998	If the Sun Rises in the West			
1998	City of the Rising Sun			
2000	The Foul King	Vision wrestler		
2002	KT			
2002	Resurrection of the Little Match Girl			
2003	A Man Who Went to Mars	Kyung-soo		
2005	This Charming Girl	Jeong-hae's ex-husband		
2005	Mr. Socrates	Han-doo		
2005	Shadowless Sword	Mabul		
2006	Sunflower	Choi Min-seok		
2008	Open City	Detective Hong Chang-hwa	Cameo	
2009	The Weird Missing Case of Mr. J	Karaoke bar waiter	Cameo	
2009	White Night	Cha Seung-jo		
2009	Girlfriends	Jin's husband	Cameo	
2010	A Friend in Need	Kang Jung-hoon		
2011	Hit	Chul-soo		
2013	New World	Lee Joong-gu		
2013	The Gifted Hands	Chul-hyun		
2013	Horror Stories 2	Manager Park	Segment: "444"	
2013	Commitment	Ri Young-ho	Cameo	
2014	Man in Love	Barbershop customer	Cameo	
2014	Tabloid Truth	Cha Seong-joo		
2014	The Fatal Encounter	Hong Guk-yeong		
2014	Man on High Heels	Prosecutor Hong		
2014	For the Emperor	Jeong Sang-ha		
2015	The Deal	Gang-chun		
2015	The Shameless	Park Joon-gil		
2015	Office	Choi Jong-hoon		
2016	A Violent Prosecutor	Yang Min-woo		
2016	Love, Lies	Police Chief		
2016	Operation Chromite	Park Nam-chul	Cameo	
2017	The Tooth and the Nail	Prosecutor Song Tae-seok		
2017	V.I.P.	NIS Executive		
2017	Method	Jae-ha		
2017	The Swindlers	Kwak Seung-gun		
2018	The Great Battle	Li Shimin		
2018	Monstrum	Jin-yong		
2018	Happy Together	Kang Suk-jin		
2019	The Dude in Me	Jang Pan-soo		
2019	Rosebud	Myeong-hwan		
2020	The Closet	Myung-jin's father		
2020	Okay! Madam	Oh Suk-hwan		
2021	Hostage: Missing Celebrity	Park Sung-woon	Cameo	
2022	Hunt	Park Jeong-hwan	Cameo	
2022	Daemuga	Ma Sung-jun		
2022	Gentleman	Kwon Do-hoon		
2022	A Man of Reason	Eung-guk		
2022	Ungnami	Woong-nam / Woong-bugi		
2022	Labang	unidentified male gentleman		
2024	The Desperate Chase	Kim In-hae		
2025	You Are the Apple of My Eye	Jin-woo's father	Cameo	
2026	Okay! Madam: Bon Voyage	Oh Suk-hwan		

=== Television series ===
Year	Title	Role	Notes	Ref.
2002	Sunshine Hunting	Moon Doo-shik		
2007	A Happy Woman	Choi Joon-shik		
2007	Several Questions That Make Us Happy			
2007	The Legend	Jumuchi		
2008	East of Eden	Baek Sung-hyun		
2009	Cain and Abel	Oh Kang-chul		
2009	Hilarious Housewives	Sung-woong		
2010	Bread, Love and Dreams	Jo Jin-goo		
2010	All My Love for You	Dong Dong boss	Cameo	
2010	Athena: Goddess of War	North Korean agent Jin-young	Guest	
2011	Big Heat	Hwang Ja-soo		
2011	Gyebaek	Kim Yushin		
2011	Birdie Buddy	Choi Dong-kwan		
2011	The Peak	Kang Moon-seok		
2011	Glory Jane	Seo In-chul		
2012	Bridal Mask	Dong-jin		
2012	KBS Drama Special: "Butcher Barber"	Woo-jin		
2013	She Is Wow!	Gong Jung-han		
2013	KBS Drama Special: "The Strange Cohabitation"	Lee Soo-hyun		
2015	Hidden Identity	Jang Moo-won		
2015	Remember	Park Dong-ho		
2016	Squad 38	Cannon carrier boss	Cameo	
2017	Man to Man	Yeo Woon-gwaang		
2018	Welcome to Waikiki	Park Sung-woong	Cameo (ep. 1)	
2018	Life on Mars	Kang Dong-chul		
2018	The Smile Has Left Your Eyes	Yoo Jin-gook		
2019	When the Devil Calls Your Name	Mo Tae-gang		
2019	Crash Landing on You	North Korean taxi driver	Cameo (ep. 4)	
2020	Rugal	Hwang Deuk-goo		
2021	Snowdrop	Nam Tae-il		
2022	Dr. Park's Clinic	Doctor	Cameo	
2022–2023	Unlock My Boss	Kim Seon-joo		
2023	Bloodhounds	Kim Myung-gil		
2023	The Killing Vote	Kwon Seok-joo		
2024	Dog Knows Everything	Lee Ji-dong		
2024	Dongjae, the Good or the Bastard	Nam Wan-sung		
2025	Nine Puzzles	Kwon Sang-beom	Cameo	
2025	A Head Coach's Turnover	Maeng Gong		
2026	Cabbage Your Life	Sung Tae-hoon		
2026	Sword & Silence	Kim Yu-sin		

=== Television show ===
Year	Title	Role	Notes	Ref.
2022	Learning Camping	Cast Member	With Shin Seung-hwan and Hong Jong-hyun	

== Ambassadorship ==
- PR Ambassador for the 2022 Dunamu Korea Professional Table Tennis League

== Awards and nominations ==
Name of the award ceremony, year presented, category, nominee of the award, and the result of the nomination
Award ceremony	Year	Category	Nominee / Work	Result	Ref.
Baeksang Arts Awards	2013	Best Supporting Actor	New World	Nominated	
Baeksang Arts Awards	2015	Best Supporting Actor	The Deal	Nominated	
Blue Dragon Film Awards	2013	Best Supporting Actor	New World	Nominated	
Buil Film Awards	2013	Best Supporting Actor	New World	Nominated	
Grand Bell Awards	2013	Best Supporting Actor	New World	Nominated	
Korea Best Dresser Awards	2014	Actor Best Dresser Award	Park Sung-woong	Won	
Korean Culture and Entertainment Awards	2019	Best Actor in a Film	The Dude in Me	Won	
SBS Drama Awards	2016	Special Acting Award, Actor in a Genre Drama	Remember	Won	
SBS Drama Awards	2023	Top Excellence Award, Actor in a Miniseries Genre/Action Drama	The Killing Vote	Won	
