= 22nd Buil Film Awards =

2013 edition of award ceremony

- Date: October 4, 2013
- Site: Haeundae Grand Hotel, Haeundae, Busan
- Hosted by: Yoo Nan-hee; Park Sung-woong

The 22nd Buil Film Awards (Korean: 부일영화상) ceremony was hosted by the Busan-based daily newspaper Busan Ilbo. It was held on October 4, 2013 at the Haeundae Grand Hotel's Grand Ballroom in Busan and was emceed by announcer Yoo Nan-hee and actor Park Sung-woong.

== Nominations and winners ==
Complete list of nominees and winners:

(Winners denoted in bold)

Best Film	Best Director
**Snowpiercer**; Jiseul; Masquerade; National Security; Nobody's Daughter Haewon	**Ryoo Seung-wan** - **The Berlin File**; Bong Joon-ho - Snowpiercer; Choo Chang-min - Masquerade; Chung Ji-young - National Security; O Muel - Jiseul
Best Actor	Best Actress
**Hwang Jung-min** - **New World**; Ha Jung-woo - The Terror Live; Jin Goo - 26 Years; Lee Byung-hun - Masquerade; Park Won-sang - National Security	**Han Hyo-joo** - **Cold Eyes**; Jo Min-su - Pietà; Jung Eun-chae - Nobody's Daughter Haewon; Kim Min-hee - Very Ordinary Couple; Lee Si-young - How to Use Guys with Secret Tips
Best Supporting Actor	Best Supporting Actress
**Ryu Seung-ryong** - **Masquerade**; Jang Gwang - 26 Years; Lee Geung-young - National Security; Ma Dong-seok - The Neighbor; Park Sung-woong - New World	**Jang Young-nam** - **A Werewolf Boy**; Jeon Hye-jin - The Terror Live; Jin Kyung - Cold Eyes; Park Hye-sook - Secretly, Greatly; Uhm Ji-won - Man on the Edge
Best New Actor	Best New Actress
**Kim Jun-gu** - **The Ugly Duckling**; Lee Hyun-woo - Secretly, Greatly; Lee Junho - Cold Eyes; Seo Young-joo - Juvenile Offender; Shim Hee-sub - Sunshine Boys	**Jung Eun-chae** - **Nobody's Daughter Haewon**; Ha Yeon-soo - Very Ordinary Couple; Jin Sun-mi - Beautiful Miss Jin; Kal So-won - Miracle in Cell No. 7; Kim Yi-jung - Your Time Is Up
Best New Director	Best Screenplay
**Kim Byung-woo** - **The Terror Live**; Cho Geun-hyun - 26 Years; Jang Hee-chul - Beautiful Miss Jin; Kang Yi-kwan - Juvenile Offender; Park Hoon-jung - New World; Roh Deok - Very Ordinary Couple	**Kim Byung-woo** - **The Terror Live**; Jeong Keun-seob - Montage; Cho Ui-seok - Cold Eyes; Kwak Kyung-taek - The Ugly Duckling; Ryoo Seung-wan - The Berlin File
Best Cinematography	Best Art Direction
**Hong Kyung-pyo** - **Snowpiercer**; Choi Young-hwan - The Berlin File; Kim Byeong-seo - Cold Eyes; Kim Young-ho - The Tower; Yang Jeong-hoon - Jiseul	**Ondrej Nekvasil** - **Snowpiercer**; Jeon Soo-ah - The Berlin File; Kwak Jae-sik, Oh Heung-seok - Masquerade; Lee Hyun-joo - Pietà; Yang Hong-sam - Mr. Go
Best Music	Buil Readers' Jury Award
**Jo Yeong-wook** - **The Berlin File**; Marco Beltrami - Snowpiercer; Jeong Yong-jin - Nobody's Daughter Haewon; Mowg, Kim Jun-seong - Masquerade; Shim Hyun-jung - A Werewolf Boy	**Masquerade**
Yu Hyun-mok Film Arts Award
**O Muel** - **Jiseul**
