= Written (film) =

- Film poster
- Hangul: 리튼
- RR: Riteun
- MR: Rit'ŭn
- Directed by: Kim Byung-woo
- Screenplay by: Kim Byung-woo
- Produced by: Kim Byung-woo
- Starring: Lee Jin-seok; Kim Bo-young; Lee Sang-hyuk; Park Jin-soo
- Cinematography: Kim Ji-hoon
- Edited by: Kim Byung-woo
- Production company: Sio Film
- Release dates: October 7, 2007 (BIFF); December 26, 2008 (South Korea)
- Running time: 87 minutes
- Country: South Korea
- Language: Korean
- Budget: US$15,000

Written (Korean: 리튼; RR: Riteun) is a 2007 South Korean drama thriller film produced, written, directed and edited by Kim Byung-woo. It stars Lee Jin-seok, Kim Bo-young, Lee Sang-hyuk and Park Jin-soo. It made its world premiere at the 2007 Busan International Film Festival.

== Plot ==
A (Lee Jin-seok) wakes up in a bathtub to find his kidney missing. As he struggles to understand what has happened and searches for his kidney, he finds out that he is just a character in a script and an actor (Lee Sang-hyuk) is playing his character. While the film crew is shooting and the script still unfinished, will A find a way out of his hellish predicament?

== Cast ==
- Lee Jin-seok as Character A
- Kim Bo-young as Writer
- Lee Sang-hyuk as Actor A
- Park Jin-soo as Director

== Production ==
Written is a film within a film. It was shot on high-definition video and cost Kim US$15,000 to make. He self-funded the project through selling his things and doing part-time jobs.

== Awards and nominations ==
Year	Award	Category	Recipient	Result
2018	43rd Karlovy Vary International Film Festival	NETPAC Award	Written	Won
