= Roh Deok =

South Korean filmmaker (born 1980)

- Born: 1980 (age 45–46); Seoul, South Korea
- Education: Seoul Institute of the Arts
- Occupations: Film director, screenwriter

Korean name
- Hangul: 노덕
- RR: No Deok
- MR: No Tŏk

Roh Deok (born 1980) is a South Korean film director and screenwriter. Roh has directed two feature films, starting with Very Ordinary Couple (2013) and The Exclusive: Beat the Devil's Tattoo (2015). She has also worked on the television drama SF8 and Netflix Original Series Glitch (2022).

== Career ==
Roh Deok majored in film directing at Seoul Institute of the Arts. She has directed several short films. Roh debuted as an assistant screenwriter for the 2003 film Save the Green Planet! directed by Jang Joon-hwan. Jang Joon-hwan and Roh are 10 years apart in age. At the time, Roh wondered if she would be able to release her own film within 10 years, and she did so with Very Ordinary Couple.

In 2005, Roh Deok directed the short film The Secret Within Her Mask. The story centers on Jung, a ballet dancer who wears a mask to conceal her bearded face and appear more masculine. Despite warnings from her boyfriend and others against a risky hair removal surgery, Jung undergoes the procedure. As she lies on the operating table, she has a realization about her true self, recognizing her beard as a unique and cool feature. The film was screened at the 2006 Asiana International Short Film Festival and the 2006 Women's Film Festival in Seoul.

Very Ordinary Couple, released in 2013, has been described by The Korea Herald and as containing "uncanny honesty and humor". It also won the Asian New Talent Award for Best Feature at the Shanghai International Film Festival in 2013.

In 2015, Roh directed The Exclusive: Beat the Devil's Tattoo (2015), which follows a man who becomes embroiled in an uncontrollable incident due to a moment of wrong judgment. Her films have different styles compared to her debut directorial film, but they showcase the talent of director Roh Deok as a 'storyteller' and allow you to explore a wide spectrum. Her 2015 film The Exclusive: Beat the Devil's Tattoo has been described as "thoroughly entertaining" by The Korea Herald.

In 2016, the theater production company Alligator Company sought a fresh perspective and approached Roh to direct the play "Closer." This marked her directorial debut in theater.

On December 30, 2020, Netflix confirmed Gin Han-sai in science fiction television series Glitch through a press release, to be produced by Studio 329. Jeon Yeo-been was offered the lead role in early March 2021. In mid-March, director Roh Deok and Jeon Yeo-been confirmed they had joined the series. On March 19, 2021, Nana was confirmed to play the role of a twitch streamer on the show. it tells the story of a young woman who tries to track down her missing boyfriend with the help of a UFO-watching club. It was released on Netflix on October 7, 2022.

Roh cowrote script for film Hidden Face with Hong Eun-mi. The film is a remake of the Colombian co-production, The Hidden Face, directed by Andrés Baiz. Directed by Kim Dae-woo, who is known for his work on erotic films such as The Obscene Scholar, The Servant, and Obsessed, the film stars Song Seung-heon, Jo Yeo-jeong, and Park Ji-hyun.

Roh, along with directors Kim Jong-kwan, Jang Hang-jun, and Lee Myung-se, co-directed The Killers, an anthology of four murder dramas based on Ernest Hemingway's short story The Killers. Each director provided their unique interpretation of the story from different perspectives. They also drew inspiration from various works of art, including Edward Hopper's renowned piece "Nighthawks," as a common motif. It is known that director Lee Myung-se directly participated in the planning and served as the general creator. Following screenings at the 23rd New York Asian Film Festival, the 28th Fantasia Film Festival, and the 29th Busan International Film Festival, the film was officially invited to the "Noves Visions" section of the 57th Sitges Film Festival.

== Filmography ==
=== Short film ===
Year	Title		Credited as		Note	Ref.
Year	English	Korean	Director	Screenplay	Note	Ref.
1998	Cheat	컨닝	Yes	Yes	8mm video, color, 5min.	
2000	The Ice Bar	쭈쭈바	Yes	Yes	16mm, color, 9min.	
2005	The Secret within Her Mask	마스크 속, 은밀한 자부심	Yes	Yes	35mm, color, 17'52"	
2024	The Killer	더 킬러스	Co-director	Co-writer	Digital	

=== Film ===
Film credits
Year	Title		Credited as			Ref.
Year	English	Korean	Director	Screenplay	Producer	Ref.
2013	Very Ordinary Couple	연애의 온도	Yes		—N/a	
2021	Hidden Face	히든페이스	—N/a	Yes	—N/a	

=== Television series ===
Year	Title		Credited as			Note	Ref.
Year	English	Korean	Creator	Director	Screenplay	Note	Ref.
2020	SF8	에스 에프 에잇	—N/a	Yes		"Manxin" episode	

=== Web series ===
Year	Title		Credited as			Note	Ref.
Year	English	Korean	Creator	Director	Screenplay	Note	Ref.
2022	Glitch	글리치	—N/a	Yes	—N/a	Netflix original series	
2025	Way Back Love	내가 죽기 일주일 전	Yes	—N/a		TVING original series	

== Stage ==
Year	Title		Credited as		Ref.
Year	English	Korean	Director	Screenplay	Ref.
2016	Closer	클로저	Yes	No	

== Accolades ==
=== Awards and nominations ===
Awards and nominations
Award ceremony	Year	Category	Nominee / Work	Result	Ref.
34th Blue Dragon Film Awards	2013	Best New Director	Very Ordinary Couple	Nominated	
22nd Buil Film Awards	2013	Best New Director	Very Ordinary Couple	Nominated	
2013 Shanghai International Film Festival	2013	Asian New Talent Award for Best Feature	Very Ordinary Couple	Won	

=== Listicles ===
Name of publisher, year listed, name of listicle, and placement
Publisher	Year	Listicle	Placement	Ref.
Cine21	2018	30 Korean Female Film Directors	Shortlisted	
