= SF8 =

South Korean television series

- Promotional poster
- Hangul: 에스 에프 에잇
- RR: Eseu epeu eit
- MR: Esŭ ep'ŭ eit
- Genre: Science fiction
- Created by: Min Kyu-dong
- Starring: See list
- Country of origin: South Korea
- Original language: Korean
- No. of episodes: 8

Production
- Executive producer: Min Jin-soo
- Producer: Various
- Cinematography: Various
- Editor: Various
- Running time: 42–58 minutes
- Production company: Soo Film

Original release
- Network: MBC TV
- Release: August 14 – October 9, 2020

SF8 (Korean: 에스 에프 에잇) is a South Korean science fiction anthology television series. It is a movie-drama crossover project between MBC, the Directors Guild of Korea, the OTT platform Wavve and the production company Soo Film. The director's cuts of all episodes were released on Wavve on July 10, 2020 while MBC TV aired one episode a week from August 14 to October 9, 2020.

The series has been regarded as a Korean equivalent of the British series Black Mirror as they have the same format and similar themes, though Min Kyu-dong believes that SF8 is more diversified since eight different filmmakers were involved in the project. SF8 was screened at the 24th Bucheon International Fantastic Film Festival.

== Synopsis ==
SF8 revolves around people who dream of a perfect society. It tackles the themes of artificial intelligence, augmented reality, virtual reality, robots, games, fantasy, horror, superpowers and disasters.

== Episodes ==
Short summaries adapted from BiFan.

No.	English title	Korean title	Directed by	Written by	Original release date
1	"The Prayer"	간호중 (Note: Ganhojung lit. "Nursing")	Min Kyu-dong	Min Kyu-dong and Kim Ji-hee	August 14, 2020
In a care home, a mother has been in a coma for 10 years, and her career is exhausted. The nursing robot, which looks after both of them, becomes distressed when it has to decide who it should save. The Prayer foresees a near future in which bedridden patients are looked after by robots and examines frequently unseen or overlooked care work. When a machine is programmed for one purpose, it becomes closer to the essence of that objective, so it inevitably reaches a realm that includes choice, anguish, and obsession beyond the programming. Is it still just a machine then? Cast: Lee Yoo-young as Gan Ho-jung / Yeon Jung-in, Ye Soo-jung as Sabina, Yeom Hye-ran as Choi Jung-gil, Moon Sook as Jong-in's mother
2	"Manxin"	만신 (Note: Mansin lit. "Female Shaman")	Roh Deok	Han Boon-ae and Roh Deok	August 21, 2020
An AI fortunetelling service called Manxin boasts a surprisingly high level of accuracy. In a world where most people deify and have blind faith in Manxin, Sun-ho, and Ga-ram, who have their own pain and secrets, search for its developer. Contrary to their expectations, they discover the true nature of Manxin. Manxin questions life and the essence of humankind through people who are, ironically, obsessed with the black arts rather than science, and others, who refuse the given path, anxiously seek the truth in a time of advanced AI, which accurately predicts the future to a large extent. Although we don't know where our time is leading, isn't it possible for human beings to live out their given time in blissful ignorance? Cast: Lee Yeon-hee as To Sun-ho, Lee Dong-hwi as Jung Ga-ram, Nam Myung-ryul as Lee Chi-ham, Seo Hyun-woo as Kim In-hong, Park Sung-yeon as Manxin church member
3	"Joan's Galaxy"	우주인 조안 (Note: Ujuin joan lit. "Astronaut Joan")	Lee Yoon-jung	Moon Joo-hee and Lee Yoon-jung	August 28, 2020
The world is covered with fine dust, and Cs, who were injected with expensive antibodies at birth, enjoy a life expectancy of 100 years, while Ns, who were not injected, live a completely different life, with a life expectancy of just 30. Having lived her entire life as a C, 26 year-old college student EO finds out that she was not given the antibody injection at birth thanks to a mistake at the hospital. Now, EO begins to wonder about the life of Ns, which has held no interest for her before. She's especially interested in Joan, the only N in the school. What does life look like when we know what's coming? The fact that the lives of the two young people who meet in the scheduled time are not clear may not be due to only the clouds of fine dust that hit the world. A story of two young people dreaming of a beautiful future with sincerity and love for each other is touching and unfolding beautifully in an opaque future that does not know how to unfold. Cast: Kim Bo-ra as Joan, Choi Sung-eun as EO, Yoon Jung-hoon as Kyung, Kim Joo-ryung as Kim Jung-won
4	"Blink"	블링크 (Note: Beullingkeu lit. "Blink")	Han Ka-ram	Kang San	September 4, 2020
Ji-woo, who lost her parents in an autonomous car accident during childhood, is a detective who believes in her instincts and abilities rather than relying on the force's artificial intelligence which analyzes data and runs simulations to inform what commands are sent to the officers. However, she misses a suspect and is forced to receive a new recruit, none other than an artificial intelligence presence, Seo Nang, implanted in her brain. Ji-woo has to solve a murder case with the help of Seo Nang, but that's not as easy as it sounds. Can they make a dream team and catch the criminal? "Blink" is based on a work by award-winning science fiction author Kim Chang-gyu. Cast: Lee Si-young as Kim Ji-woo, Ha Jun as Seo Nang (AI partner: tutelar deity), Lee Jun-hyeok as Chief
5	"Baby It's Over Outside"	일주일 만에 사랑할 순 없다 (Note: Iljuil mane saranghal sun eoptda lit. "You Can't Love in a Week")	Ahn Gooc-jin	Han Boon-ae	September 11, 2020
The world is going to end in one week's time. As the end approaches, people reveal all sorts of hidden aptitudes, even psychic abilities. Hye-hwa tries to prevent the world from coming to an end with Kim Nam-woo, a forever-single type, who just feels lonely, even at that critical moment. Can they save the world and start love? One week is enough time for the world to end, but not enough for love to begin. For the time being, there aren't many things left to do, but the end of the world would be the moment I disappear. However, if I existed somewhere else, the world would carry on regardless. "Baby It's Over Outside" holds a question about the existence of both the world and us. All the characters in the film are adorable, particularly the psychics who come forward to the save the world: Hye-hwa, who is embarrassed about her trivial abilities, and Nam-woo, who believes he has met her before. Cast: Lee David as Kim Nam-woo, Shin Eun-soo as Shin Hye-hwa, Hwang Jung-min as Teacher Yang, Bae Hae-sun as News anchor
6	"White Crow"	하얀까마귀 (Note: Hayankkamagwi lit. "White Crow")	Jang Cheol-soo	Kang Sun-ju	September 18, 2020
Juno, a famous online game streamer with 8.0 million subscribers, is entangled in a controversy when a former classmate claims Juno falsely made up her own past. Having lost all her money, fame and fans that she had accrued over time, she seeks to recover her reputation and to return to the air by participating in a live broadcast of a new psychology-based VR game. However, she can't overcome the trauma she faces in the game, and she is trapped in the virtual world. In this fiendish game that makes people go back into their past traumas, the past she faces is even more painful. The nightmare within the game, which seems never ending, is a part of her own subconsciousness that she hasn't addressed, or perhaps she doesn't want to know about. Cast: Ahn Hee-yeon as Juno, Lee Se-hee as Jang Joon-oh, Shin So-yul as Shin Ji-soo
7	"Love Virtually"	증강콩깍지 (Note: Jeunggangkongkkakji lit. "Augmented Bean Pod")	Oh Ki-hwan	Oh Ki-hwan	September 25, 2020
In the near future, more than half of the world population uses 'Love Virtually', a state-of-the-art virtual dating app. People find the partners they want with whose face they want, using a 'Love Virtually' ID, which becomes a general trend. A couple creates their IDs with their faces before plastic surgery and develop their love for each other. On the anniversary of the 100th day of their first meeting through the app, the couple are about to make love, but the app is down. Love Virtually is a romantic comedy about a couple searching for true love in a world where virtual reality is the norm by mixing the real world and virtual reality. Both in the real world and virtual reality, they meet each other before and after cosmetic surgery; the world's standards for appearance might be meaningless for people trying to find their other half. The important thing is 'the apple of my eye', regardless of the real or virtual world. Cast: Choi Si-won as Seo Min-joon, Uee as Han Ji-won, Ahn Se-ha as Gu Sung-tae, Kim Han-na as Tak Soo-jin
8	"Empty Body"	인간 증명 (Note: In-gan jeungmyeong lit. "Human Proof")	Kim Ui-seok	Kim Ui-seok and Lee Hannah	October 9, 2020
In a future when the human brain and AI can be connected, Hye-ra's son dies in an accident, but she manages to revive him by combining part of his brain with AI. One day, Hye-ra finds her son's behavior is changing, and suspects that it started after the connection was made. While impersonating her son, the AI deceives her and wipes out his soul. Cast: Moon So-ri as Ga Hye-ra, Jang Yoo-sang as Ga Young-in

== Production ==
=== Development ===
Min Kyu-dong, creator of the series, said that "sci-fi movies were the driving force behind many movie directors' dreams. Unfortunately, due to the relatively high budget and narrow market limitations, various works were not able to be produced." He had been working on this project for two years before he partnered with Wavve and MBC. He also took charge of casting the actors, which lasted for a year.

During a press conference held at CGV Yongsan I'Park Mall in Seoul on July 8, 2020, Min Kyu-dong said that all the episodes were produced with an equal amount of budget and that the overall budget was lower than one of a small commercial film. Roh Deok, who co-wrote and directed the "Manxin" episode, mentioned that "while commercial film productions [...] inevitably limit the directors' freedom as a creator, [they] had more independence in production" and "although there were physical limits, [he] thinks [they] went through the process of discovering what [they] can do inside those boundaries."

=== Filming ===
Eight directors from the Directors Guild of Korea (DGK) each directed an episode from the series. Filming began on February 21, 2020 with Jang Cheol-soo's "White Crow" and ended on May 7 with Kim Ui-seok's "Empty Body". Filming was completed within 10 filming sessions for each episode.

=== Credits ===
Credits adapted from BiFan.

Title	Producer	Cinematographer	Editor	Sound	Music	Production Design
"The Prayer"	Park Joon-ho	Kang Gook-hyun	Jeung Ji-eun	Gong Tae-won	Kim Joon-sung and Kim Ji-ae	Kim Geu-na
"Manxin"	Kang Ga-mi	Kim Hyun-seok	Kim Woo-hyun	Lee In-gyu and Sung Yoon-yong	Hong Dae-sung	Kim Ji-oh
"Joan's Galaxy"	Jung Hye-young	Yang Hyun-seok	Kim Ji-hyun	Gong Tae-won	Park In-young	Ji Hyun-seo and Choi Yoo-re
"Blink"	Na Hyun-joon	Lee Sung-eun	Chung Sang-hyuk	Kim Jung-hwan	Kim Joon-seok	Kim Young-tak
"Baby It's Over Outside"	Lee Yong-soo	Park Sung-hoon	Park Min-sun	Monocon	Han Seo-jin and Lee Sung-kyung	Hong Joo-hee
"White Crow"	Park Jin-sung	Kim Goo-young	TODA edit	Song Seo-deok	Kim Ji-ae	Choi Yon-shik
"Love Virtually"	Park Sun-hye	Lee Sung-yong	Son Yeon-ji	Gong Tae-won	Lee Ji-soo	Choi Im
"Empty Body"	Ahn Soo-yoon	Baek Sung-bin	Kim Ui-seok	Lim Hyun-kyu and Song Seo-deok	Sunwoo Jung-a	Kim Do-eun

== Release ==
The director's cut was released on the OTT platform Wavve on July 10, 2020 and the original episodes were aired on MBC TV from August 14 to October 9.
