= 34th Blue Dragon Film Awards =

2013 edition of award ceremony

- Date: November 22, 2013
- Site: Kyung Hee University's Peace Palace Hall in Seoul
- Hosted by: Kim Hye-soo; Yoo Jun-sang

Television coverage
- Network: SBS

The 34th Blue Dragon Film Awards ceremony was held at Kyung Hee University's Peace Palace Hall in Seoul on November 22, 2013. It was broadcast on SBS and was hosted by Kim Hye-soo and Yoo Jun-sang.

== Nominations and winners ==
Complete list of nominees and winners:

(Winners denoted in bold)

Best Film	Best Director
**Hope**; The Berlin File; The Face Reader; New World; Snowpiercer	**Bong Joon-ho - Snowpiercer**; Han Jae-rim - The Face Reader; Lee Joon-ik - Hope; Park Hoon-jung - New World; Ryoo Seung-wan - The Berlin File
Best Actor	Best Actress
**Hwang Jung-min - New World as Jung Chung**; Ha Jung-woo - The Terror Live as Yoon Young-hwa; Ryu Seung-ryong - Miracle in Cell No. 7 as Lee Yong-gu; Sul Kyung-gu - Hope as Im Dong-hoon; Song Kang-ho - The Face Reader as Nae-gyeong	**Han Hyo-joo** - **Cold Eyes as Ha Yoon-joo**; Kim Min-hee - Very Ordinary Couple as Jang Young; Moon Jeong-hee - Hide and Seek as Joo-hee; Uhm Ji-won - Hope as Kim Mi-hee; Uhm Jung-hwa - Montage as Ha-kyung
Best Supporting Actor	Best Supporting Actress
**Lee Jung-jae** - **The Face Reader as Grand Prince Suyang**; Cho Jin-woong - Hwayi: A Monster Boy as Ki-tae; Jo Jung-suk - The Face Reader as Paeng-heon; Jung Woo-sung - Cold Eyes as James; Park Sung-woong - New World as Lee Joong-gu	**Ra Mi-ran** - **Hope as Young-seok's mother**; Go Ah-sung - Snowpiercer as Yona; Jang Young-nam - A Werewolf Boy as Sun-yi's mother; Jeon Mi-seon - Hide and Seek as Min-ji; Kim Hye-soo - The Face Reader as Yeon-hong
Best New Actor	Best New Actress
**Yeo Jin-goo** - **Hwayi: A Monster Boy as Hwa-yi**; Go Kyung-pyo - Horror Stories 2 as Go Byeong-shin; Im Seulong - 26 Years as Kwon Jung-hyuk; Lee Hyun-woo - Secretly, Greatly as Rhee Hae-jin; Seo Young-joo - Moebius as Son	**Park Ji-soo** - **Mai Ratima as Mai Ratima**; Jung Eun-chae - Nobody's Daughter Haewon as Haewon; Lee Eun-woo - Moebius as Mother; Nam Bo-ra - Don't Cry, Mommy as Eun-ah; Nam Ji-hyun - Hwayi: A Monster Boy as Yoo-kyung
Best New Director	Best Screenplay
**Kim Byung-woo** - **The Terror Live**; Huh Jung - Hide and Seek; Jeong Keun-seob - Montage; Jo Sung-hee - A Werewolf Boy; Roh Deok - Very Ordinary Couple	**Kim Ji-hye, Jo Joong-hoon** - **Hope**; Kim Byung-woo - The Terror Live; Kim Dong-hyuk - The Face Reader; Lee Hwan-kyung - Miracle in Cell No. 7; Park Ju-seok - Hwayi: A Monster Boy
Best Cinematography	Best Art Direction
**Choi Young-hwan - The Berlin File**; Go Nak-seon - The Face Reader; Hong Kyung-pyo - Snowpiercer; Chung Chung-hoon, Yu Eok - New World; Kim Byung-seo, Yeo Kyung-bo - Cold Eyes	**Ondřej Nekvasil** - **Snowpiercer**; Cho Hwa-sung - New World; Jeon Soo-ah - The Berlin File; Lee Ha-jun - The Face Reader; Yang Hong-sam - Mr. Go
Best Lighting	Best Music
**Kim Sung-kwan** - **The Berlin File**; Bae Il-hyuk - New World; Kim Seung-gyu - Cold Eyes; Lee Sung-jae - Hide and Seek; Shin Kyung-man, Lee Chul-oh - The Face Reader	**Mowg** - **Hwayi: A Monster Boy**; Bang Jun-seok - Hope; Dalpalan, Jang Young-gyu - Cold Eyes; Jo Yeong-wook - Hide and Seek; Lee Dong-jun - Miracle in Cell No. 7
Technical Award	Best Short Film
**Jeong Seong-jin** - **Mr. Go (Special Effects)**; Choi Min-young, Kim Chang-ju - Snowpiercer (Editing); Eric Durst - Snowpiercer (Special Effects); Jung Doo-hong, Han Jung-wook - The Berlin File (Fight Choreography); Shin Min-kyung - Cold Eyes (Editing)	**Mija**
Popular Star Award	Audience Choice Award for Most Popular Film
**Gong Hyo-jin** - **Boomerang Family**; **Kim Min-hee** - **Very Ordinary Couple**; **Lee Byung-hun** - **G.I. Joe: Retaliation, Red 2**; **Sul Kyung-gu** - **Hope, Cold Eyes**	**Miracle in Cell No. 7**

== Gallery ==
Award ceremony gallery

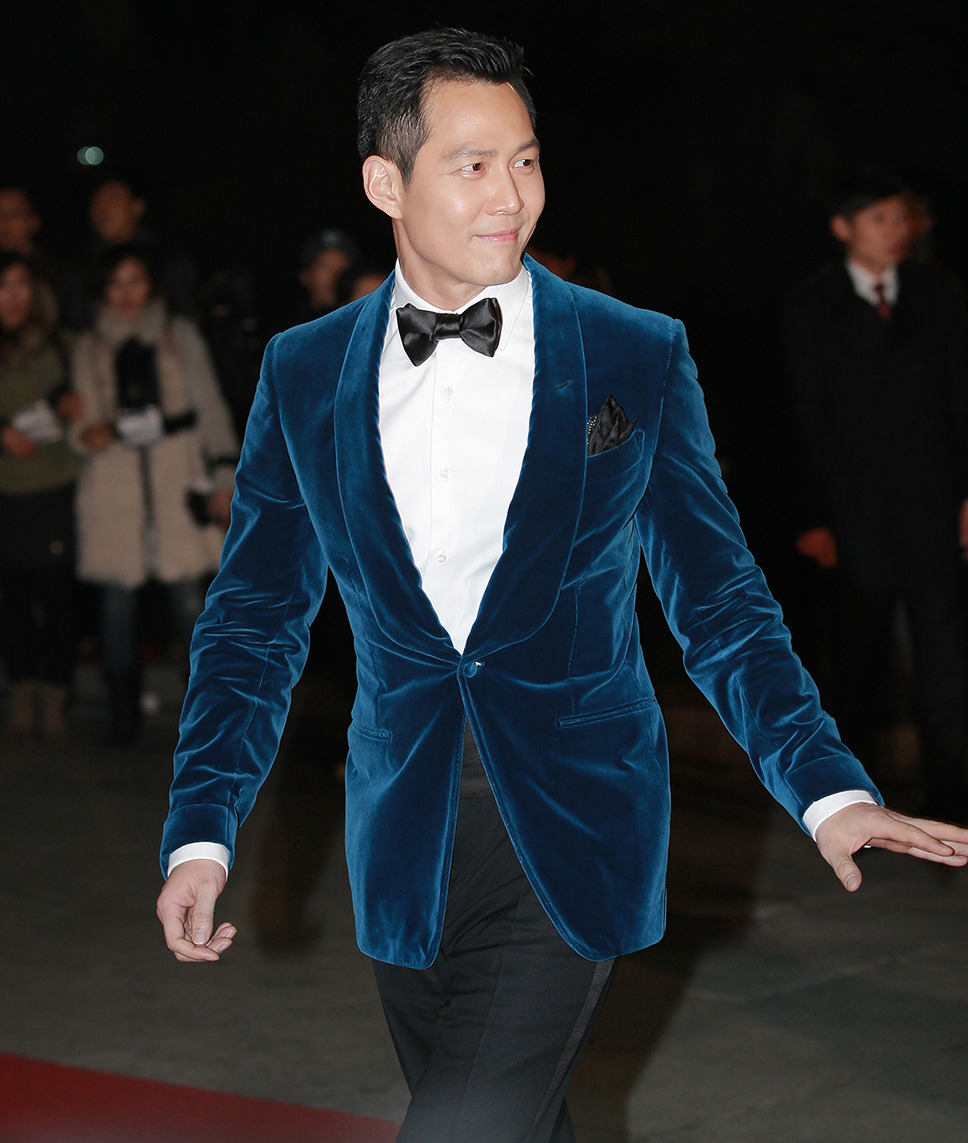
Lee Jung-jae, Best Supporting Actor

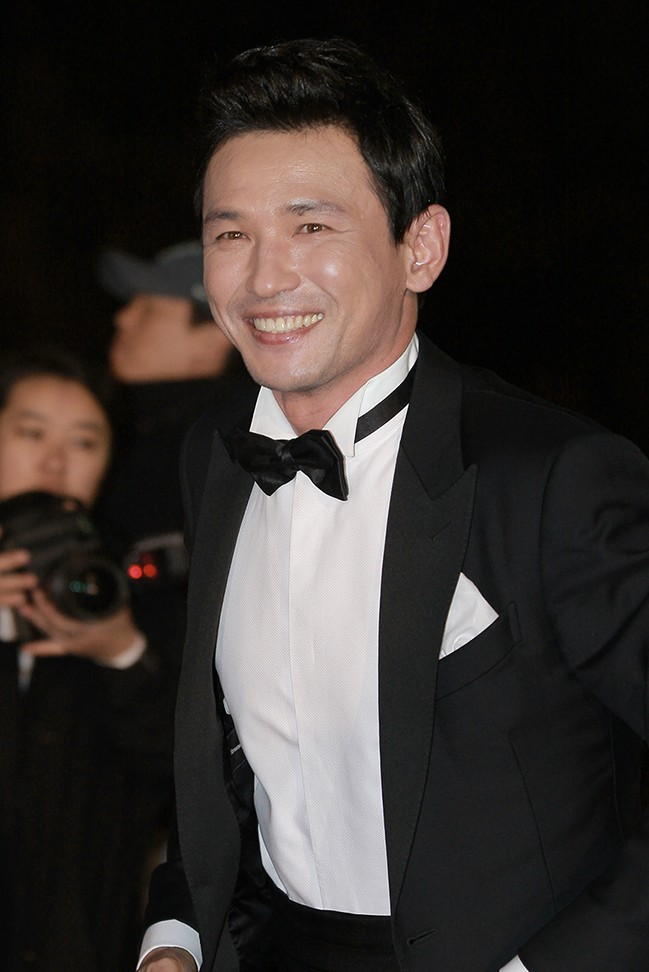
Hwang Jung-min, Best Actor

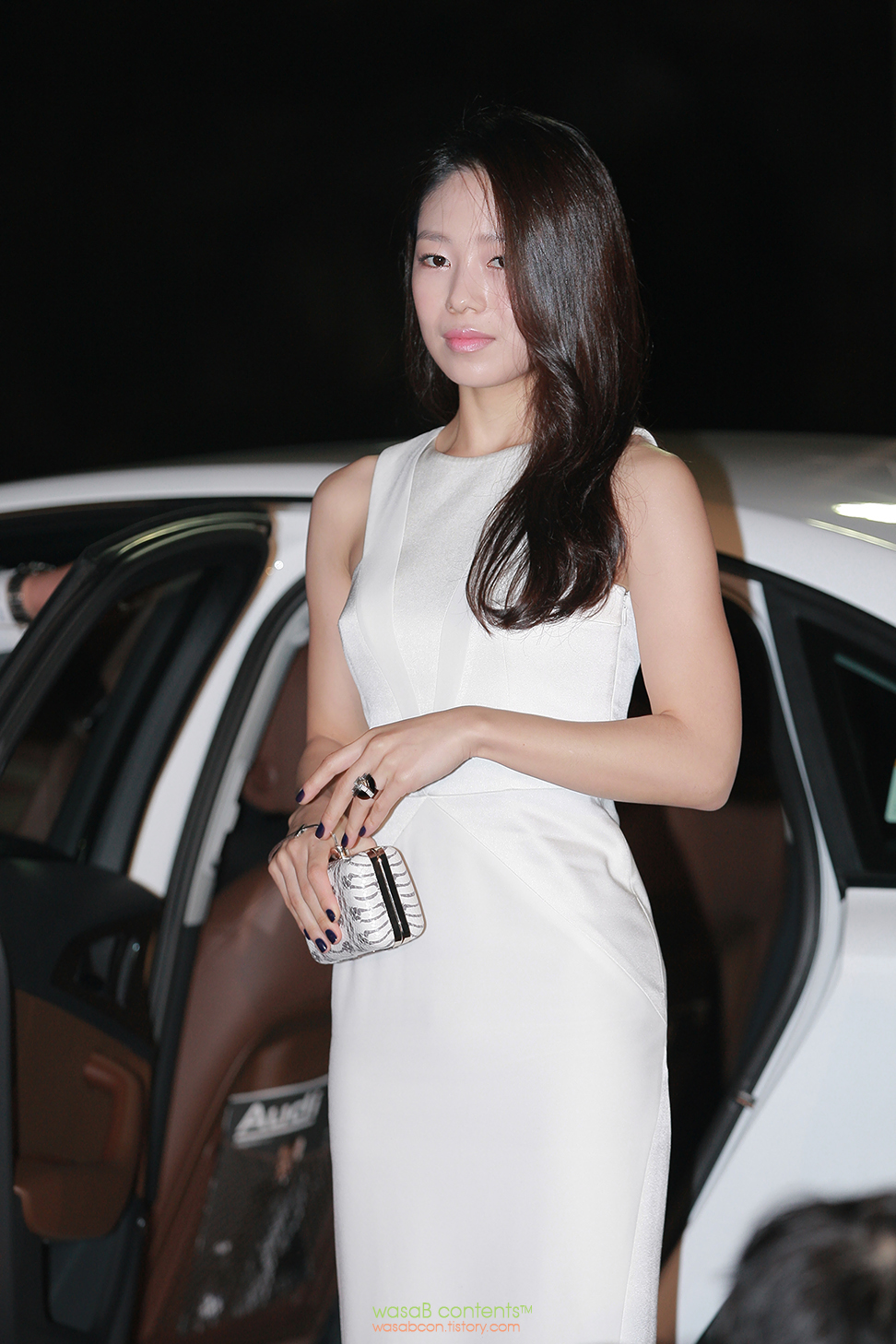
Park Ji-soo, Best New Actress

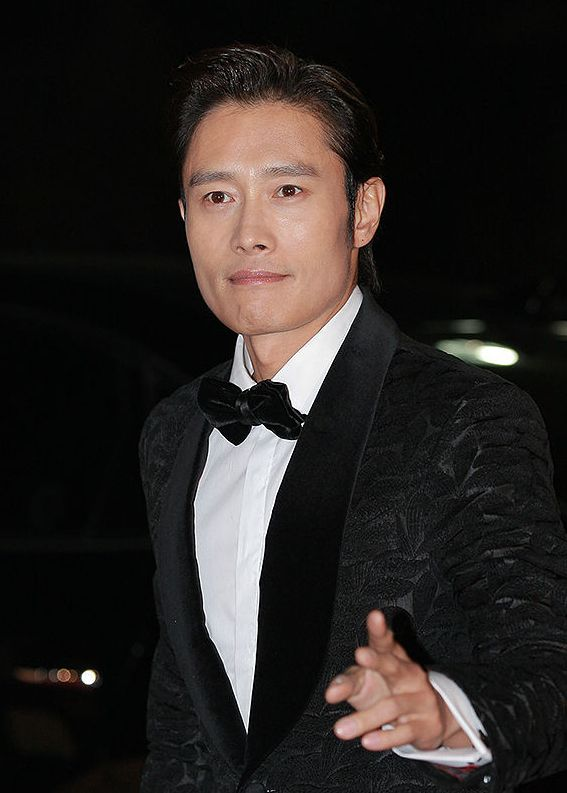
Lee Byung-hun, Popular Star Award

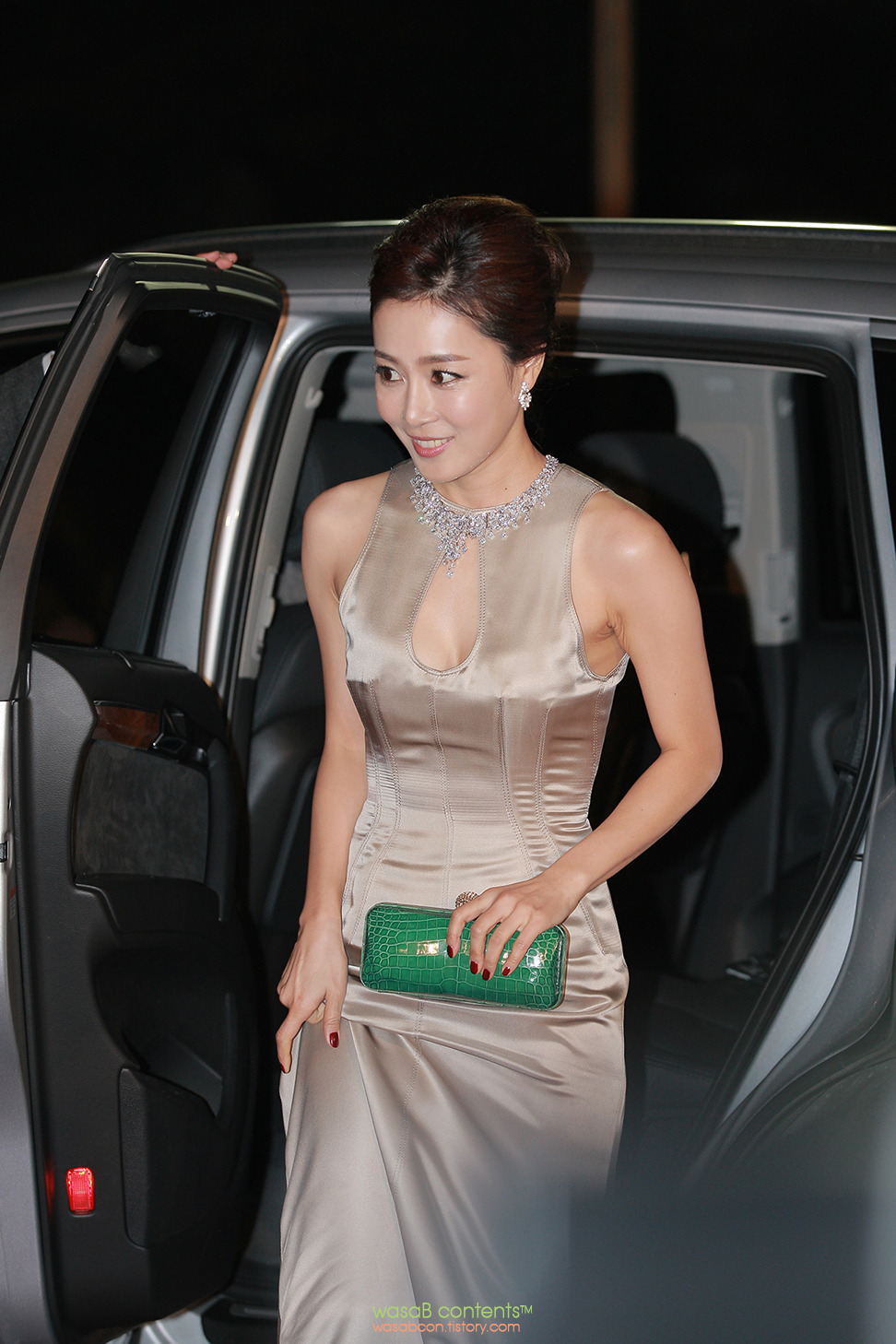
Moon Jeong-hee

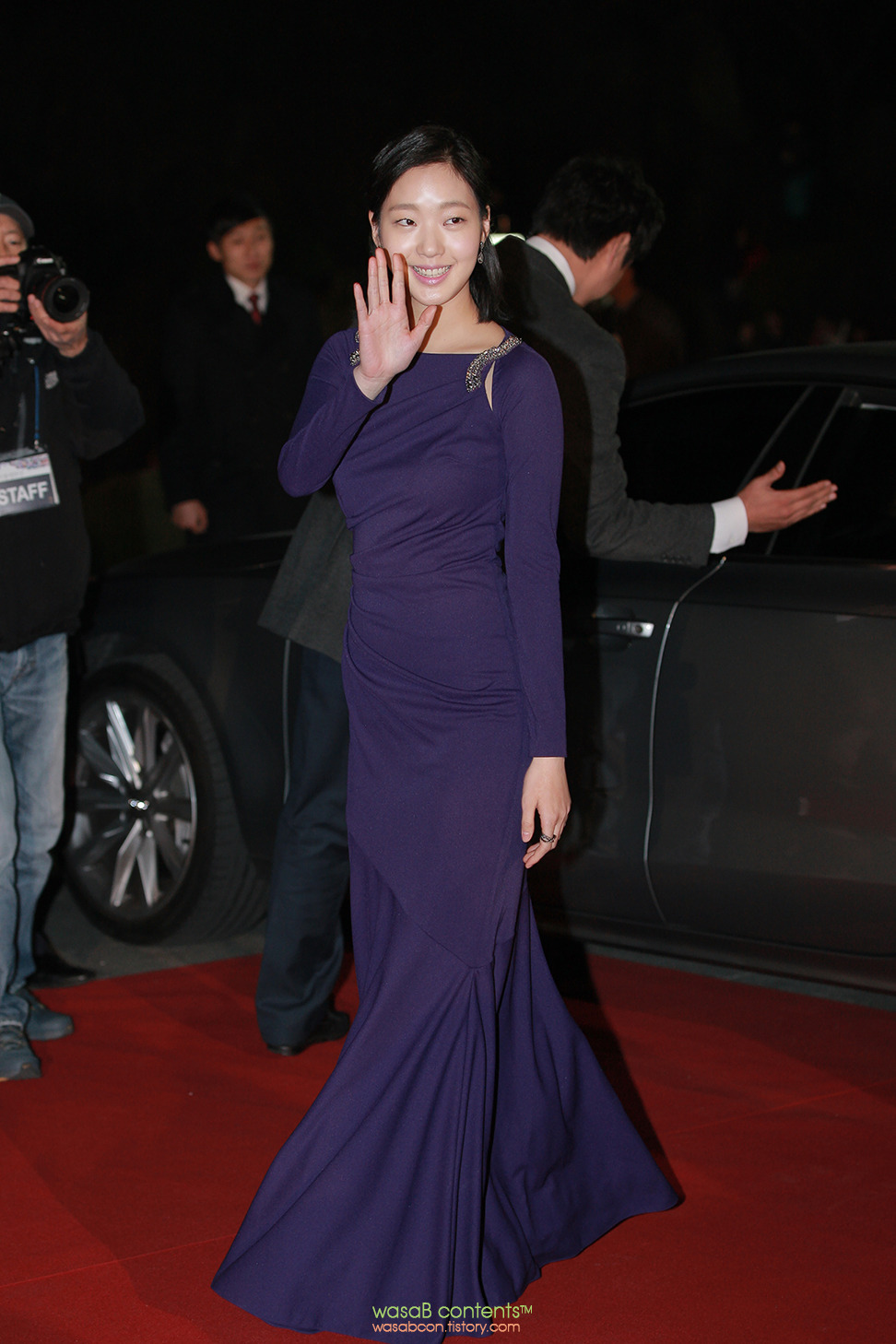
Kim Go-eun

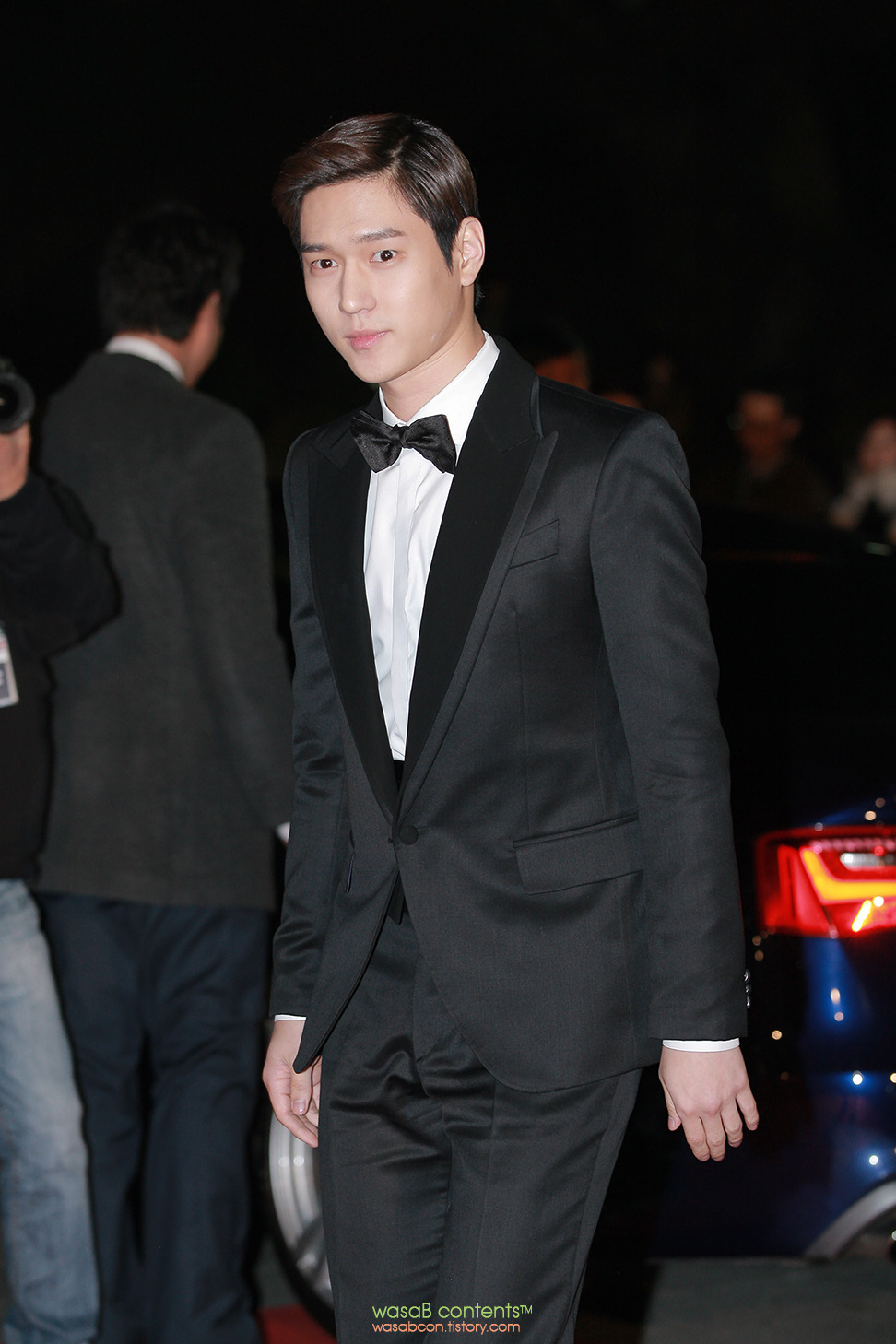
Go Kyung-pyo

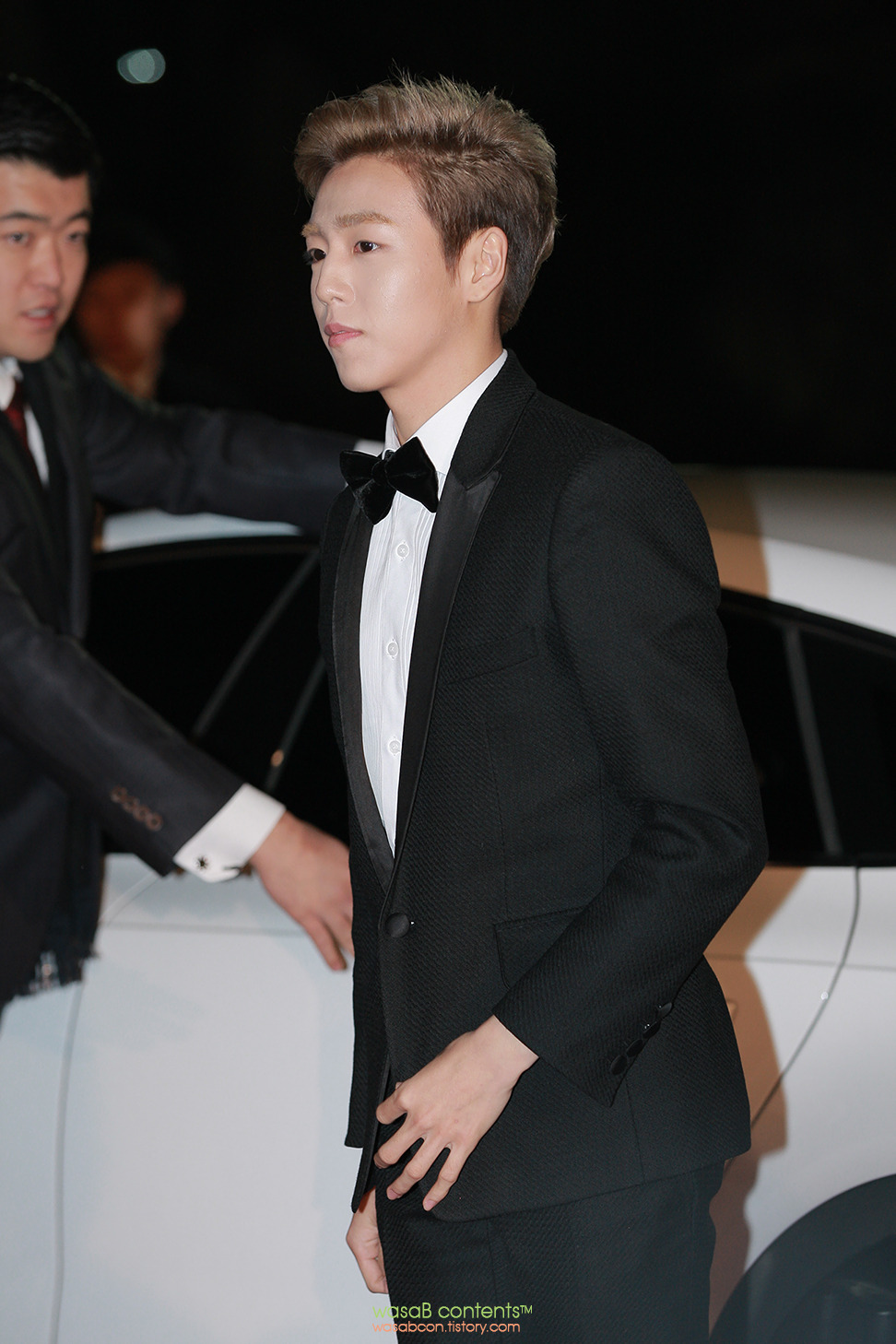
Lee Hyun-woo

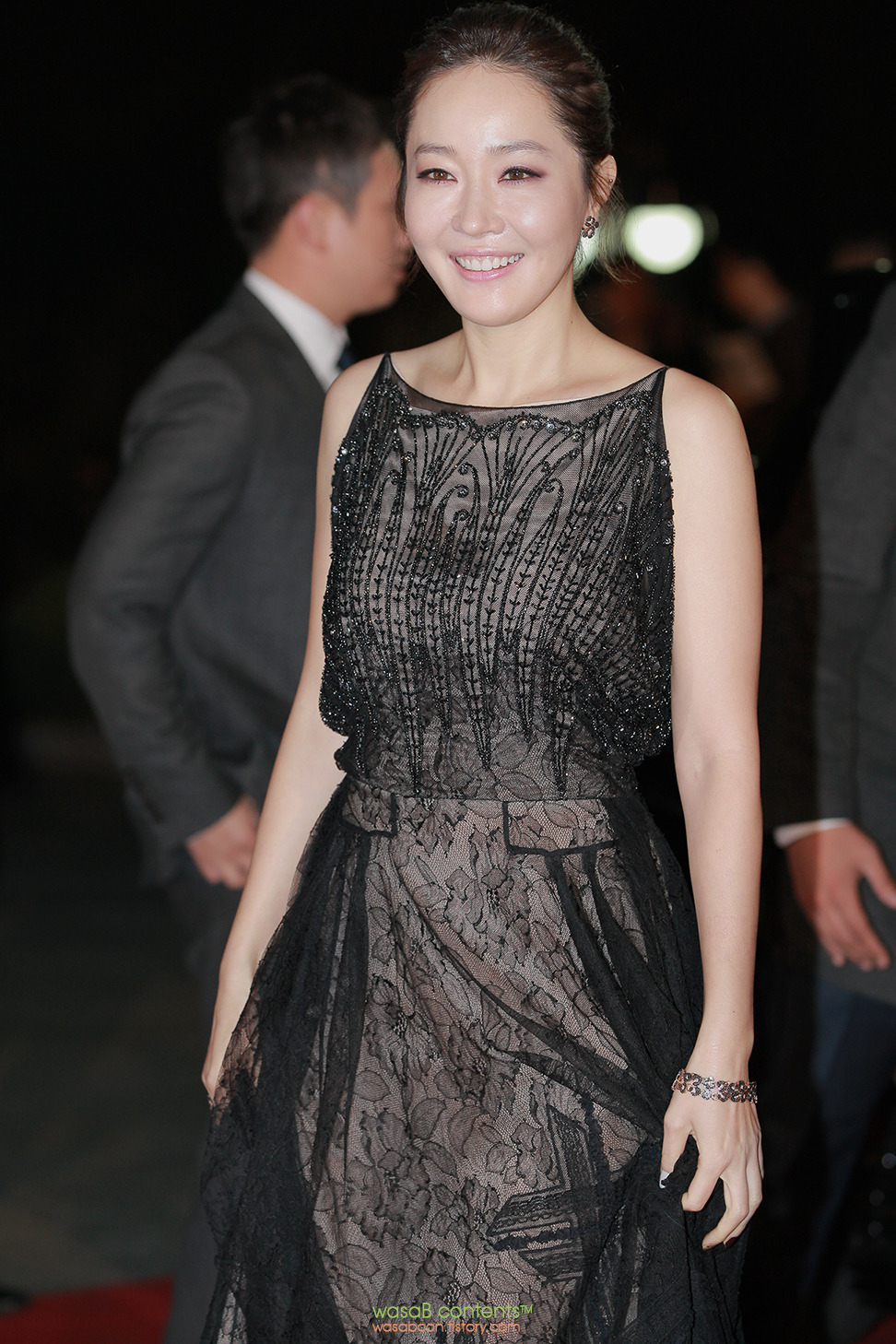
Uhm Ji-won

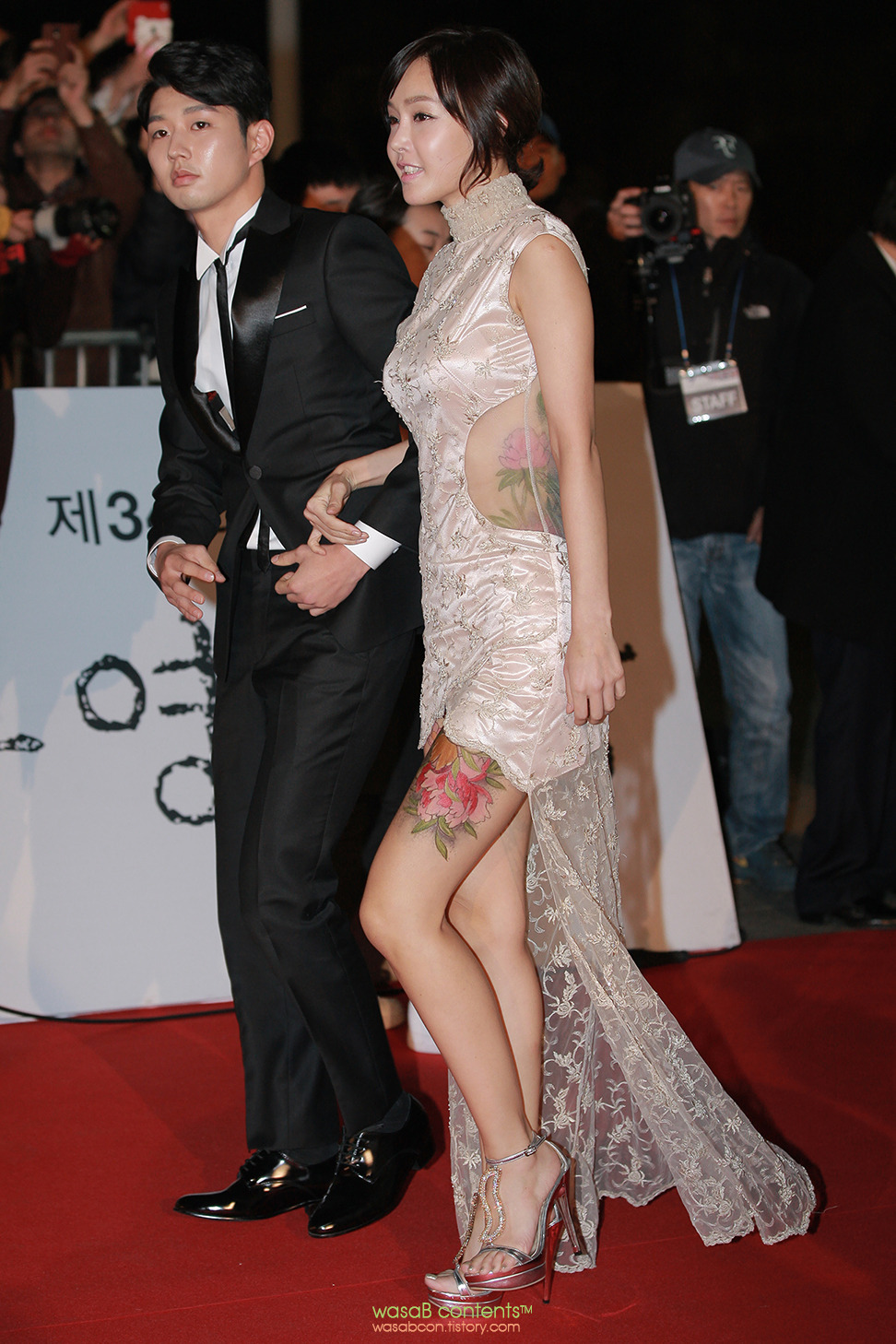
Kim Sun-young

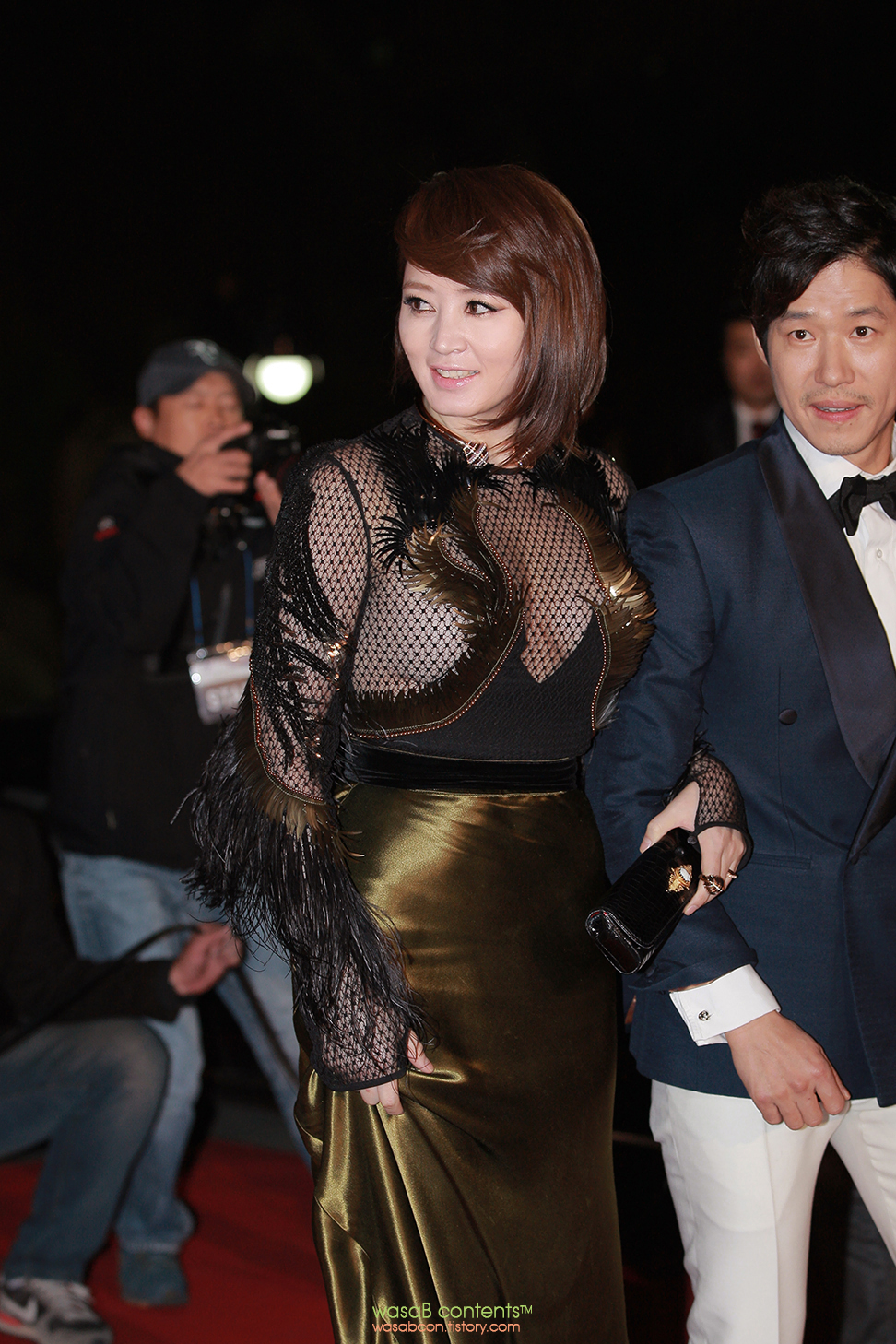
Kim Hye-soo, host
