= The Terror Live =

2013 South Korean film by Kim Byung-woo

- Film poster
- Hangul: 더 테러 라이브
- RR: Deo tereo raibeu
- MR: Tŏ t'erŏ raibŭ
- Directed by: Kim Byung-woo
- Written by: Kim Byung-woo
- Produced by: Lee Choon-yeon; Jeon Ryeo-kyung
- Starring: Ha Jung-woo
- Cinematography: Byun Bong-sun
- Edited by: Kim Chang-ju
- Music by: Lee Ju-no
- Production company: Cine 2000
- Distributed by: Lotte Entertainment
- Release dates: July 28, 2013 (PiFan); July 31, 2013 (South Korea)
- Running time: 98 minutes
- Country: South Korea
- Language: Korean
- Budget: US$3.12 million
- Box office: US$35.7 million

The Terror Live (Korean: 더 테러 라이브) is a 2013 South Korean action-thriller film written and directed by Kim Byung-woo. It stars Ha Jung-woo as an ambitious news anchorman who monopolizes the live broadcast of a terrorist attack following the explosion of Mapo Bridge on the Han River, as the story unfolds within the narrow confines of a radio booth.

== Plot ==
Yoon Young-hwa was once a top news anchor, but gets demoted due to an unsavory incident. Pulled from primetime TV news and recently divorced, he is now the jaded and bitter host of a current affairs radio program. One day during his morning show, Yoon receives a peculiar phone call threatening to blow up the Mapo Bridge, a major bridge that crosses the Han River and connects Mapo District and Yeouido, Seoul's main business and investment banking district; it is also just outside Yoon's studio building. At first, Yoon takes it as a joke or prank call and tells the terrorist to proceed. He watches in shock as the caller follows through on the threat and detonates explosives that cause Mapo Bridge to collapse, killing innocent people and trapping others.

Realizing this could be a once-in-a-lifetime opportunity to make his comeback as a newscaster, Yoon purposely doesn't call the police. Instead, he sets up a makeshift television studio from his radio station, and negotiates with his former boss, the profit- and ratings-obsessed news producer Cha Dae-eun who'll do anything to beat the other TV stations in their coverage of the bombing. Then Yoon strikes a dangerous deal with the terrorist to exclusively broadcast their phone conversations live, in real-time, as the whole nation watches.

The newsroom erupts in chaos as Yoon, Cha, the police, other broadcasters and the Blue House all exploit terrorism for their own agenda. The only exception is Yoon's ex-wife, a reporter who volunteers to report from the site of the terrorist attack. As the live show progresses, Yoon gradually realizes how little control he has over the situation. The terrorist, who claims to be a 50-something construction worker who lost three of his coworkers in a senseless industrial accident while fixing the bridge, says the families of the victims weren't compensated and demands a public apology from the president for the deaths of his colleagues. With several people remaining on the bridge as hostages, the terrorist threatens a second explosion. He also reveals to Yoon alone that he put a bomb in the anchor's earphone, and that if the president doesn't apologize, the bomb will explode in his ear, live on air.

While Young-hwa desperately tries to get the President to apologise, the terrorist decides to detonate the bridge containing innocent civilians and Yoon's ex-wife on it. Young-hwa immediately is overcome with grief and regret as he thinks through about what he could have done to not only save his ex-wife, but the civilians stuck there as well if he wasn't overcome by the corruption. Cha Dae-eun abandons Young-hwa to take the blame as the terrorist has supposedly been found in a neighbouring uncompleted building opposite the SNC news building. The terrorist then calls Young-hwa to tell him that he is going to blow up the building, but Young-hwa is too late to warn the police not to arrest him. In the end, the unfinished building blows up and topples slightly in the direction of the SNC news building, with the radio studio getting destroyed and the other crew evacuating without him due to his earpiece bomb. He is then hit by a falling light piece and is knocked out.

When he comes to, he is woken up to an empty office. He later receives a call from the terrorist, who gives him five minutes to get the president's apology after telling him the earpiece bomb was a fake, to presumably make Young-hwa quicken his actions. Young-hwa then discovers that the terrorist is calling from the SNC news building's warehouse. He then sets up a trap, pretending to go live with a makeshift setup, successfully intimidating the terrorist to come up into the radio studio, where his face is streamed live, and Young-hwa pounces on him. The two men engage in a difficult struggle, in which the terrorist falls off the edge of the building, only holding on to the cables and his detonator. Young-hwa then realises that the terrorist is actually Park Shin-Woo, who is the son of the alias he took, which was his father, trying to get an apology in his name for living a dog's life unfairly. Young-hwa's conscience gets to him, and he finally asks Shin-woo to grab his hand and let go of the detonator, pleading with him not to die so shamefully like his father did. Unfortunately, Shin-woo is shot by the police snipers, and the President of South Korea goes live on television to claim victory over this 'war on terrorism'. Young-hwa then hears the police arriving, realising that the police were also going to kill him for 'collaborating' with the terrorist, decides to set off the detonator. The SNC building then tilts and falls directly on top of the National Assembly building where the parliament convenes and where the president is presumably making his announcement, silently stating that since the President didn't want to apologise, he and the whole parliament would die with him.

== Cast ==
- Ha Jung-woo as Yoon Young-hwa
- Lee Geung-young as Cha Dae-eun
- Jeon Hye-jin as Park Jeong-min
- Lee David as Park Shin-woo
- Kim So-jin as Reporter Lee Ji-soo
- Im Hyun-sung as newsroom monitor engineer
- Kim Hae-in as Noh Hyeon-jin
- Han Sung-chun as radio PD
- Lee Chung-hee as radio writer
- Jeon Su-ji as Policewoman
- Kang Shin-chul as newsroom audio engineer
- Kang Jin-a as newsroom writer
- Kim Hong-pa as police commissioner Joo Jin-chul
- Choi Deok-moon as secretary Kim Sang-mo
- Choi Jin-ho as anchor Lee Sang-jin
- Kim Dae-myung as Park Shin-woo (voice)

== Release ==
Partially funded by the Network of Asian Fantastic Films, The Terror Live was the closing film of the 17th Puchon International Fantastic Film Festival. It was released in theaters on July 31, 2013.

It also received a limited North American release beginning August 9, screening in 25 cities including Los Angeles, Chicago, Fullerton, Atlanta, Las Vegas, Philadelphia, Seattle, Dallas, San Diego, Houston, Vancouver, Toronto, New York City, Irvine, New Jersey, San Francisco, Santa Clara, Washington and Honolulu.

== Box office ==
Despite opening on the same day as blockbuster Snowpiercer, The Terror Live performed well at the box office, on the strength of good reviews from film critics and strong word of mouth. According to the Korean Film Council (KOFIC), it consistently placed second on the box office charts, reaching two million ticket sales six days after its release. With a modest budget of ₩3.5 billion (US$3.12 million), the film hit its break-even point during its first week of release. After 19 days of release, it has accumulated 5 million admissions to date.

== Remakes ==
A Hindi remake titled Dhamaka directed by Ram Madhvani, featuring Kartik Aaryan in lead role was released on November 19, 2021, on Netflix.

A Japanese remake titled Showtime 7, directed by Kazutaka Watanabe and starring Hiroshi Abe, was released on February 7, 2025, by Shochiku and Asmik Ace.

== Awards and nominations ==
Year	Award	Category	Recipient	Result
2013
2013	14th Busan Film Critics Awards	Best Actor	Ha Jung-woo	Won
2013	14th Busan Film Critics Awards	Best New Director	Kim Byung-woo	Won
2013	22nd Buil Film Awards	Best Actor	Ha Jung-woo	Nominated
2013	22nd Buil Film Awards	Best Supporting Actress	Jeon Hye-jin	Nominated
2013	22nd Buil Film Awards	Best New Director	Kim Byung-woo	Won
2013	22nd Buil Film Awards	Best Screenplay	Kim Byung-woo	Won
2013	34th Blue Dragon Film Awards	Best Actor	Ha Jung-woo	Nominated
2013	34th Blue Dragon Film Awards	Best New Director	Kim Byung-woo	Won
2013	34th Blue Dragon Film Awards	Best Screenplay	Kim Byung-woo	Nominated
2014	9th Max Movie Awards	Best Actor	Ha Jung-woo	Nominated
2014	19th Chunsa Film Art Awards	Technical Award	Kim Si-yong	Nominated
2014	50th Baeksang Arts Awards	Best Film	The Terror Live	Nominated
2014	50th Baeksang Arts Awards	Best Director	Kim Byung-woo	Nominated
2014	50th Baeksang Arts Awards	Best Actor	Ha Jung-woo	Nominated
2014	50th Baeksang Arts Awards	Best Screenplay	Kim Byung-woo	Nominated
2014	34th Golden Cinema Festival	Grand Prize (Daesang) in Acting	Ha Jung-woo	Won
