= Very Ordinary Couple =

- Film poster
- Hangul: 연애의 온도
- Hanja: 戀愛의 溫度
- RR: Yeonaeui ondo
- MR: Yŏnaeŭi ondo
- Directed by: Roh Deok
- Written by: Roh Deok
- Produced by: Kim Seon-yong; Han Jae-rim
- Starring: Lee Min-ki; Kim Min-hee
- Cinematography: Park Jong-chul
- Edited by: Jeong Jin-hee
- Music by: Kim Jun-seong
- Production company: Vanguard Studio
- Distributed by: Lotte Entertainment
- Release date: March 21, 2013
- Running time: 112 minutes
- Country: South Korea
- Language: Korean
- Box office: US$12.7 million

Very Ordinary Couple (Korean: 연애의 온도; RR: Yeonaeui ondo; lit. Romance's Temperature) is a 2013 South Korean romantic comedy film written and directed by Roh Deok (alternatively spelled Noh Deok), starring Lee Min-ki and Kim Min-hee as a recently separated couple who, being employees at the same bank, must deal with the prospect of continually seeing each other on a daily basis. This inevitably leads to tension and flareups, but over time their feelings towards each other begin to change.

This is Roh Deok's feature directorial debut. She based the screenplay on her own love life and those of her circle of friends.

== Plot ==
The film follows young bank clerks Lee Dong-hee (Lee Min-ki) and Jang Young (Kim Min-hee) who have just broken up with each other. They work at a local branch of Standard Chartered, and their seemingly nasty split turns scandalous in the office. After going through a period of irrational behavior, including physical fights and Young's impulsive one-night stand with a mutual colleague at work, the two decide to give their relationship another try. Once again, they are madly in love.

The real story of the film begins as the two begin to date again, in spite of their shared doubts and fears. As the second honeymoon phase ends, the same problems ― those that had led to their initial break-up ― surface: the boredom, the trust issues, and the mutual dishonesty about what they really want. The hot-tempered Dong-hee seems like he needs an anger management class, while Young tries to avoid conflicts by telling small lies ― unaware of how lies, regardless of the motivations, can destroy trust.

Above all, the couple's shared experience of the break-up gradually makes them insecure about their relationship. This eventually leads to a suffocating disaster: Dong-hee tries very hard to pretend that he is interested in the things Young suggests doing, only to please her and save their relationship ― although he'd really rather sleep in than go to an amusement park on his day off. Young, on the other hand, gets extremely self-conscious of everything she tells Dong-hee, as she is worried that she will upset him off by "saying something wrong" ― just like how she did before the first break-up.

There is a sadness that fills the screen as the two desperately try to save their relationship, pretending nothing is wrong and trying to believe that things will work out in the end. "I will be good to her," Dong-hee repeatedly says in the film. "I'll try harder to make this work."

Despite their efforts, the damage to their relationship has taken its toll. Ultimately, the two main characters realize that there are some things in life that cannot be fixed no matter how hard they try.

== Cast ==
- Lee Min-ki as Lee Dong-hee
- Kim Min-hee as Jang Young
- Ha Yeon-soo as Hyo-seon
- Ra Mi-ran as Ms. Son, deputy department head in bank
- Choi Moo-sung as Mr. Kim, section chief in bank
- Kim Kang-hyeon as Mr. Park, senior clerk in bank
- Park Byung-eun as Mr. Min, deputy department head in bank
- Lee Moon-jeong as Ms. Choi, clerk in bank
- Yoon Kyeong-hee as intern
- Choi Gwi-hwa as husband of Ms. Son
- Moon Chang-gil as bank branch manager
- Tae In-ho as instructor

== Reception ==
Billed as a romantic comedy, but which might also be described simply as a relationship drama, Very Ordinary Couple made an impressive start at the box office with 1.8 million admissions in four weeks. Viewers praised the strong acting in the film as well as its comparatively realistic, non-romantic view of contemporary relationships. Debut director Roh Deok had previously worked as a scripter on Jang Joon-hwan's cult classic Save the Green Planet! (2003) and also received praise for her short film The Secret within Her Mask (2005).

== Awards and nominations ==
2013 Baeksang Arts Awards

- Best Film Actress - Kim Min-hee

2013 Shanghai International Film Festival

- Asian New Talent Award for Best Feature

2013 Mnet 20's Choice Awards

- Nomination - 20's Movie Star, Female - Kim Min-hee

2013 Buil Film Awards

- Nomination - Best Actress - Kim Min-hee
- Nomination - Best New Director - Roh Deok
- Nomination - Best New Actress - Ha Yeon-soo

2013 Blue Dragon Film Awards

- Nomination - Best Actress - Kim Min-hee
- Nomination - Best New Director - Roh Deok
