= The Berlin File =

- Theatrical release poster
- Hangul: 베를린
- RR: Bereullin
- MR: Perŭllin
- Directed by: Ryoo Seung-wan
- Written by: Ryoo Seung-wan
- Produced by: Kang Hye-jung
- Starring: Ha Jung-woo; Han Suk-kyu; Ryoo Seung-bum; Jun Ji-hyun
- Cinematography: Choi Young-hwan
- Edited by: Kim Sang-bum; Kim Jae-bum
- Music by: Jo Yeong-wook
- Production company: Filmmaker R&K
- Distributed by: CJ Entertainment
- Release date: January 31, 2013
- Running time: 120 minutes
- Country: South Korea
- Languages: Korean; English; German; Arabic
- Budget: US$9 million
- Box office: US$49 million

The Berlin File (Korean: 베를린; RR: Bereullin; lit. 'Berlin') is a 2013 South Korean action spy film written and directed by Ryoo Seung-wan. Ha Jung-woo stars as a North Korean agent in Berlin who is betrayed and cut loose when a weapons deal is exposed. Together with his wife, a translator at the North Korean embassy in Berlin played by Jun Ji-hyun, they try to escape being purged, with Ryoo Seung-bum and Han Suk-kyu playing North and South Korean operatives on their trail.

== Plot ==
After a tense illegal arms deal in a Berlin hotel involving North Korean spy Pyo Jong-seong, a Russian broker, and a Middle Eastern terrorist goes wrong when disrupted by unknown assailants, Pyo narrowly escapes but encounters morass of conflicting evidence that may reveal why he was set up. Also investigating the failed weapons sale, embattled South Korean intelligence agent Jung Jin-soo goes after Pyo to uncover his identity, but is left trying to decode whether the North Korean "ghost" agent (whose information cannot be found on any intelligence database) is a double agent or taking the fall for a more insidious plot.

Finding himself embroiled in a vast international conspiracy, Jung must determine the North's role in the deal, as well as the potential involvement of the American CIA, Israel's Mossad, international terrorist organizations, and any other covert operatives lurking in Berlin's polyglot underworld. Confronting the possibility of a double agent within Berlin's North Korean embassy where his wife Ryun Jung-hee is a translator, Pyo discovers that Pyongyang security authorities have dispatched ruthless fixer Dong Myung-soo to sort out potentially conflicting loyalties at the consulate. Dong's investigation quickly implicates Ryun and gives Pyo just 48 hours to incriminate his wife, who is suspected of leaking information on the arms deal to South Korean agents trying to gain access to a secret multibillion-dollar bank account controlled by Pyongyang authorities.

Though having an apparently loveless marriage, Pyo is reluctant to betray Ryun, particularly after she discloses she's pregnant. He senses that she was set up by Dong and his father to gain favor with North Korean leader Kim Jong Un. But when the North Korean ambassador makes an attempt to defect to the West, Pyo becomes incriminated as well. Narrowly escaping an assassination squad dispatched by Dong, Ryun and Pyo go on the run, with the rival Korean intelligence agencies closing in fast. After escaping Dong contacts the brother of the middle eastern terrorist Abdul, who enlists his help after claiming the Pyo was responsible for ratting out his brother to the Israeli Mossad. Eventually Pyo and Ryun are cornered and captured by the Arabs who tracked them down following Dong's tips, but saved by a following Jung. Despite Pyo breaking free from the Arabs and killing one of their men, they still manage to get away with a captured Ryun.

Jung and Pyo eventually enter a jagged alliance where Pyo not only has to rescue his wife but also defect to the South Koreans. Eventually Pyo and Jung track down a safehouse where Dong and Abdul await. Pyo gets captured again but reveals via tape recorder that Dong is actually responsible for the whole set up of the deal. Enraged by this, Abdul and his men turns on Dong but are interrupted by a flash grenade fired by Jung. In the chaos Abdul and his men and Dong's men are killed in a three way shootout between Pyo, Jung, Dong, the North Koreans and the Arabs. Dong and Pyo face each other in an ultimate showdown that culminates in Pyo killing Dong with an injection. Unfortunately, his wife Ryun gets caught in the crossfire and dies from her wound. Jung reports to headquarters, where he learns that Dong's father has covered up the scandal using Pyo as a scapegoat.

Although frustrated at the internal corruption, Jung has his hands tied. He meets with Pyo and cautions him to go into hiding and live the rest of his life "looking over [his] shoulder", as both the North and South Korean governments consider him as a fugitive. Later, Pyo can be seen inside an airport at an unspecified time later, having called Dong's father to tell him that he is coming. Pyo books a ticket to Vladivostok, the site of a new gas pipeline deal between North and South Korea.

== Cast ==
- Ha Jung-woo as Pyo Jong-seong
- Han Suk-kyu as Jung Jin-soo
- Ryoo Seung-bum as Dong Myung-soo
- Jun Ji-hyun as Ryun Jung-hee
- Lee Geung-young as Ri Hak-soo, North Korean ambassador
- John Keogh as Marty, CIA agent
- Numan Açar as Abdul, an Arabic henchman and brother of Assim, who is manipulated into helping Dong.
- Pasquale Aleardi as Dagan Zamir, Mossad agent
- Choi Moo-sung as Kang Min-ho
- Kwak Do-won as Chung Wa-dae
- Kim Seo-hyung as North Korean embassy secretary
- Thomas Thieme as Siegmund, German politician
- Tayfun Bademsoy as Assim
- Werner Daehn as Yuri, arms broker
- Sinja Dieks as restaurant waitress
- Bae Jung-nam as Myung-soo's agent
- Baek Seung-ik as agency personnel
- Park Ji-hwan as agency personnel
- Seo Ji-oh as agency backup personnel
- Toni Varvasoudis as Abdul's men
- Matthias Günther as Abdul's men
- Oskars Lauva as Abdul's men
- Can Aiyden as Abdul's men
- Baek Dong-hyeon as North Korean agent
- Jo Ha-seok as North Korean agent
- Ji Geon-woo as North Korean agent
- Kwon Ji-hun as South Korean agent
- Kim Seon-woong as South Korean agent
- Kwak Jin-seok as South Korean agent
- Myung Gye-nam as Dong Jung-ho, Myung-soo's father
- Yoon Jong-bin as South Korean field analyst
- Lee Kyoung-mi as South Korean office analyst

== Production ==
While preparing for the film, director Ryoo Seung-wan met with several North Korean defectors and shot the documentary Spies for Korean broadcaster MBC as part of a special series that aired in 2011, intending "to make a realistic, fast-paced, Korean-style espionage action film about South Korean agents discovering North Korea's secret accounts and how political dynamics between the two Koreas get involved." Ryoo said he wanted the film to be reminiscent of The Bourne Identity, and on an emotional level, to focus on the solitude and sorrow of those who live as secret agents.

Budgeted at US$9 million, the film was produced by Ryoo's own production shingle Filmmakers R&K, and financed by CJ Entertainment. Seasonal aspects play an important part in the film; Ryoo shot the film almost 100% on location in Europe. Filming began on April 16, 2012, on a film set in Namyang, south of Seoul, in Gyeonggi Province. After wrapping there, cast and crew relocated to Berlin, Germany and Riga, Latvia in early May 2012, and among the locations were the roof of Berlin's Westin Grand Hotel, in Schöneberg, at the Hackescher Markt, and on Pariser Platz in front of the iconic Brandenburg Gate in full view of the American and French Embassies. The shoot involved a 15-person German crew from Film Base Berlin, but the majority of production elements and talent were Korean, including around 80 crew members who brought their entire equipment. Observing that Ryoo did the recces of the locations with the actors so that they could get used to the settings, Film Base boss Mathias Schwerbock described the director as "very thorough and precise in his preparations. They are fast at shooting and very efficient."

Stunt coordinator Jung Doo-hong choreographed the film's action sequences. With over 40% of the film in English, American screenwriter Ted Geoghegan was hired to construct and polish the film's English dialogue, based on writer/director Ryoo's translated Korean text.

== Release ==
The Berlin File was released in South Korea on January 31, 2013. It also had a limited theatrical run in 21 North American cities on February 15, 2013, including Los Angeles, Las Vegas, Chicago, New York, New Orleans, Vancouver, Toronto and Montreal.

== Box office ==
The action blockbuster had a strong opening, drawing more than 2.8 million admissions (US$19 million) in just over a week after its release, with 1.53 million tickets sold during its first weekend alone. A scene in which Ha Jung-woo's character gobbles a baguette was not included in the final edit, and director Ryoo Seung-wan promised fans to make the footage public when the film exceeded 3 million admissions. The clip was released on February 7. The film reached 5 million admissions after 14 days of release, and eventually a total of 7.17 million admissions. It took in ₩52.4 billion (US$43.9 million) at the Korean box office.

== Critical reception ==
Local critics praised the action set-pieces and acting performances, with the caveat that the film's overall quality was hindered by the overly convoluted plot.

According to Yonhap and Screen Daily, the film's highlights were "its spectacular and breathtaking fight and action scenes" and "secretive and gloomy atmosphere." Film Business Asia stated that the film is "flawed by a finale that doesn't top the previous set pieces but otherwise contains enough superbly staged action and rich performances to keep any audience hooked for two hours." The Korea Times called the actors "superb," with special mention to how Ha Jung-woo "breathe(s) a layer of complexity into the shortest of lines," the "brilliant" Ryoo Seung-bum, and that Jun Ji-hyun "deftly handles" her role. But though it opined that Ryoo "has never produced a more polished action movie" with its "tightly-packed and smartly-placed action scenes," it panned the script for being "preposterous and un-ambitious at the same time."

The Berlin File received mostly positive reviews from major US media outlets during its North American theatrical release. The New York Times hailed its "exhilarating action set pieces," adding that Ryoo "brings his brand of muscular action and quicksilver agility to the shifting battleground of international espionage." The Hollywood Reporter praised the careful balancing of narrative tension, writing that "the film crackles with tense character conflict." Bloomberg gave it four stars out of five, saying, "the film offers just about all you could ask of a genre flick; poisoning, defections, a secret North Korean bank account, gloriously choreographed fights that go insanely over the top, febrile tension and doomy romance." The Village Voice said, "the enjoyable analog antics end with one character boarding the train bound for Vladivostok, but judging from the evidence, it's Hollywood where we can expect to see Ryoo Seung-wan appear before long."

== Awards and nominations ==
Year	Award	Category	Recipients	Result	Ref.
2013	49th Baeksang Arts Awards	Best Film	The Berlin File	Nominated	
2013	49th Baeksang Arts Awards	Best Director	Ryoo Seung-wan	Nominated	
2013	49th Baeksang Arts Awards	Best Actor	Ha Jung-woo	Won	
2013	Mnet 20's Choice Awards	20's Movie Star, Male	Ha Jung-woo	Nominated	
2013	Mnet 20's Choice Awards	20's Movie Star, Female	Jun Ji-hyun	Nominated	
2013	22nd Buil Film Awards	Best Director	Ryoo Seung-wan	Won	
2013	22nd Buil Film Awards	Best Music	Jo Yeong-wook	Won	
2013	22nd Buil Film Awards	Best Screenplay	Ryoo Seung-wan	Nominated	
2013	22nd Buil Film Awards	Best Cinematography	Choi Young-hwan	Nominated	
2013	22nd Buil Film Awards	Best Art Direction	Jeon Soo-ah	Nominated	
2013	33rd Korean Association of Film Critics Awards	Best Actress	Jun Ji-hyun	Nominated	
2013	50th Grand Bell Awards	Best Cinematography	Choi Young-hwan	Won	
2013	50th Grand Bell Awards	Best Lighting	Kim Sung-kwan	Won	
2013	50th Grand Bell Awards	Best Editing	Kim Sang-bum	Nominated	
2013	50th Grand Bell Awards	Best Costume Design	Shin Ji-young	Nominated	
2013	50th Grand Bell Awards	Best Art Direction	Jeon Soo-ah	Nominated	
2013	34th Blue Dragon Film Awards	Best Film	The Berlin File	Nominated	
2013	34th Blue Dragon Film Awards	Best Director	Ryoo Seung-wan	Nominated	
2013	34th Blue Dragon Film Awards	Best Cinematography	Choi Young-hwan	Won	
2013	34th Blue Dragon Film Awards	Best Lighting	Kim Sung-kwan	Won	
2013	34th Blue Dragon Film Awards	Best Art Direction	Jeon Soo-ah	Nominated	
2013	34th Blue Dragon Film Awards	Technical Award	Jung Doo-hong, Han Jung-wook	Nominated	
2013	14th Busan Film Critics Awards	Technical Award	Jung Doo-hong	Won	
2014	19th Chunsa Film Art Awards	Technical Award	Choi Young-hwan	Nominated	

== Sequel ==
Ryoo Seung-wan announced in October 2015 that he had already written a draft screenplay for a sequel, which he aims to shoot in Vladivostok and Korea, then release by 2017.
