= The Exclusive: Beat the Devil's Tattoo =

- Poster
- Directed by: Roh Deok
- Written by: Roh Deok
- Produced by: Han Jae-rim
- Starring: Jo Jung-suk; Lee Ha-na; Lee Mi-sook
- Cinematography: Park Yong-su
- Edited by: Kim Chang-ju
- Music by: Jo Yeong-wook
- Production companies: Wooju Film; Vanguard Studio
- Distributed by: Lotte Entertainment
- Release date: October 22, 2015 (South Korea)
- Running time: 125 minutes
- Country: South Korea
- Language: Korean
- Box office: ₩3.15 billion

The Exclusive: Beat the Devil's Tattoo (Korean: 특종: 량첸살인기; RR: Teukjong: ryangchensaringi) is a 2015 South Korean black comedy crime thriller film directed by Roh Deok. It was released on October 22, 2015.

== Plot ==
The film revolves around the life of a journalist named, Heo Moo-hyeok (Jo Jung-suk), working for the channel CNBS. He is also at the verge of a divorce from his wife, Soo Jin(Lee Ha-na) who doesn't have any plan to reunite with him even though Heo doesn't want to be separated from her.

She is also pregnant for almost 6-months. She doesn't want to reunite with him because she couldn't completely accept the fact that the child is Heo's as she had already started seeing a painter. So, she's feeling guilty of deceiving her husband even though they are not together as they haven't divorced yet. During this course of time, there occurs a series of brutal murders contemporarily in Seoul. The cops, media and people are totally nervous and afraid to be out as the murderer hasn't left a single evidence to trace out except a strange red car.

At this time our Heo loses his job for reporting a truth related to one of the channel's sponsor's relative. At the very day itself, he gets an anonymous call to the office landline, from a lady claiming that she know about the whereabouts of the serial killer with a "strange red car". Heo who is totally depressed out of losing job and his wife, was completely delighted and felt as if it is seeing an oasis at the center of a desert after wandering for days thirstily. So, with the evidence that are sufficient to believe, Heo reports the fact to the world through his channel with the full support from his superiors especially the Director(Lee Mi-sook). As a reward he gets back his job, gets huge remuneration and is also appointed as the deputy chief. But later he himself finds out that he is totally wrong and real culprit is someone else. But his circumstances forces him to cover up the fact. Later on,

== Cast ==
- Jo Jung-suk as Heo Moo-hyeok
- Lee Ha-na as Heo Soo-jin
- Lee Mi-sook as General manager Baek
- Kim Eui-sung as Director Moon
- Bae Seong-woo as Chief Oh
- Kim Dae-myung as Han Seung-woo
- Tae In-ho as Team leader Yoo
- Baek Hyun-jin as Writer Kim
- Elok Pratiwi as Clara
- Yoon Da-kyung as Director Ko
- Park Chae-ik as Seo Doo-ho

== Reception ==
The film was number-three on its opening weekend, with ₩3.15 billion.
