= Jung Eun-chae =

South Korean actress and model (born 1986)

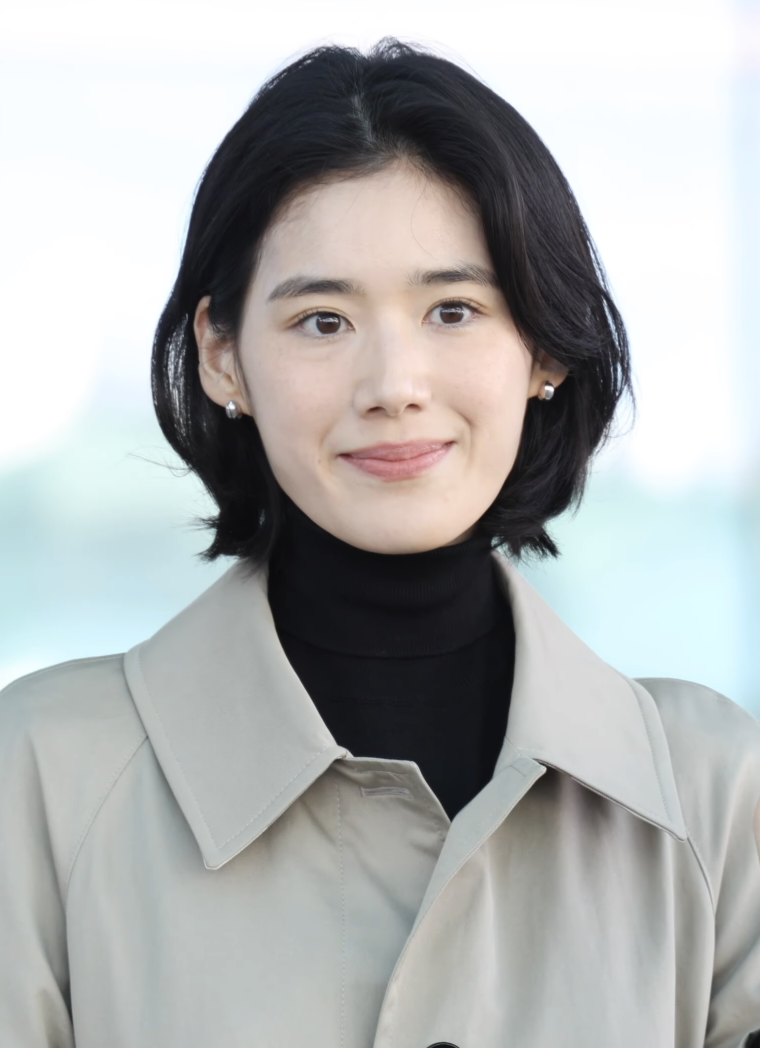
- Jung in September 2025
- Born: Jung Sol-mi; November 24, 1986 (age 39); Busan, South Korea
- Occupations: Actress; model; TV host
- Years active: 2010–present
- Agent: Project Hosoo

Korean name
- Hangul: 정솔미
- RR: Jeong Solmi
- MR: Chŏng Solmi

Stage name
- Hangul: 정은채
- RR: Jeong Eunchae
- MR: Chŏng Ŭnch'ae

Jung Sol-mi (Korean: 정솔미; born November 24, 1986), known professionally as Jung Eun-chae (정은채), is a South Korean actress, model and TV host. Jung began her career as a model, then made her acting breakthrough as the titular character in Nobody's Daughter Haewon (2013), a film by auteur Hong Sang-soo that premiered at the 63rd Berlin International Film Festival.

== Early life ==
Jung Eun-chae moved to London at the age of 15 and spent eight years living in the United Kingdom. During this time, she pursued an interest in art and design, eventually enrolling at the Central Saint Martins College to study Textile Design. However, she ultimately decided to leave the university before completing her degree to return to South Korea and pursue a career in acting; consequently, her final educational attainment is listed as a dropout. Her interest in the entertainment industry was further encouraged by the influence of her older brother, who worked at the production company Chorokbaem Media.

== Career ==
Jung Eun-chae debuted as a commercial model. A string of memorable commercials has earned her a CF Model of the Year title at the 2011 6th Asia Model Festival Awards. She uses a stage name instead of her real name because of the similarity with a veteran actress Park Sol-mi. Jung made her acting debut after passing the audition for the supernatural thriller film Haunters.

Since then, Jung has alternated between doing blockbuster films such as The Fatal Encounter, The King, The Great Battle and art films such as Nobody's Daughter Haewon, Hill of Freedom, The Table. Her breakthrough came with Nobody's Daughter Haewon, in which she received multiple prestigious awards winning and nominations.

Jung's debut in television dramas was through the 2011 KBS1 telenovela My Bittersweet Life. Three years later, she acted in a psychological thriller series Dr. Frost.

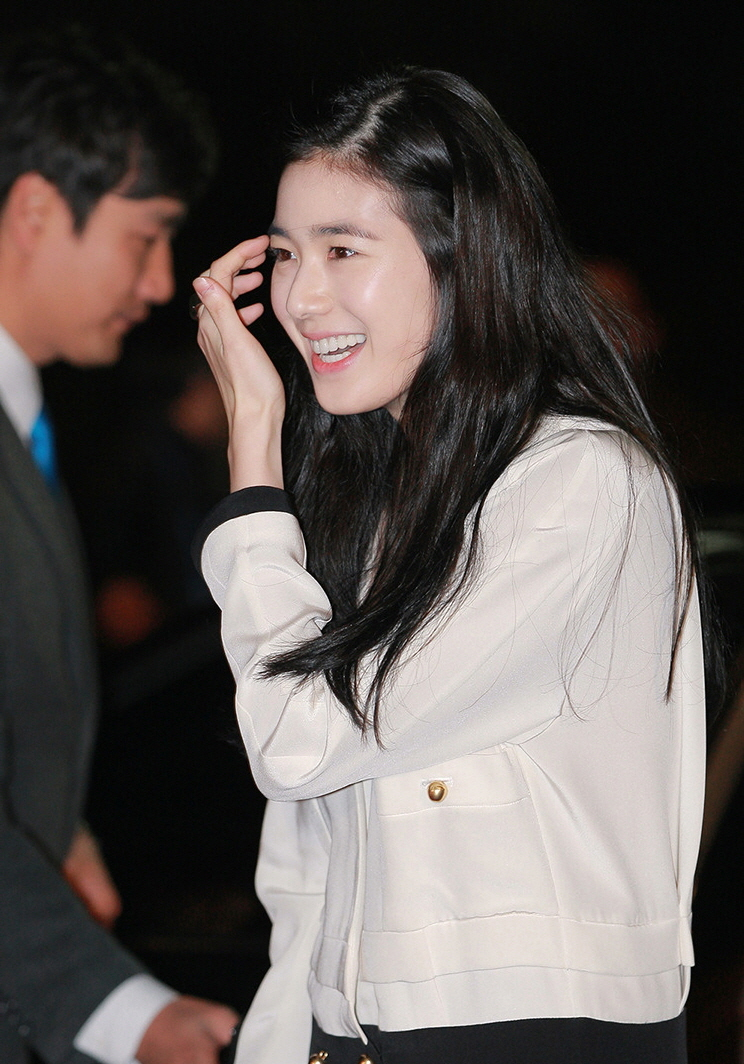
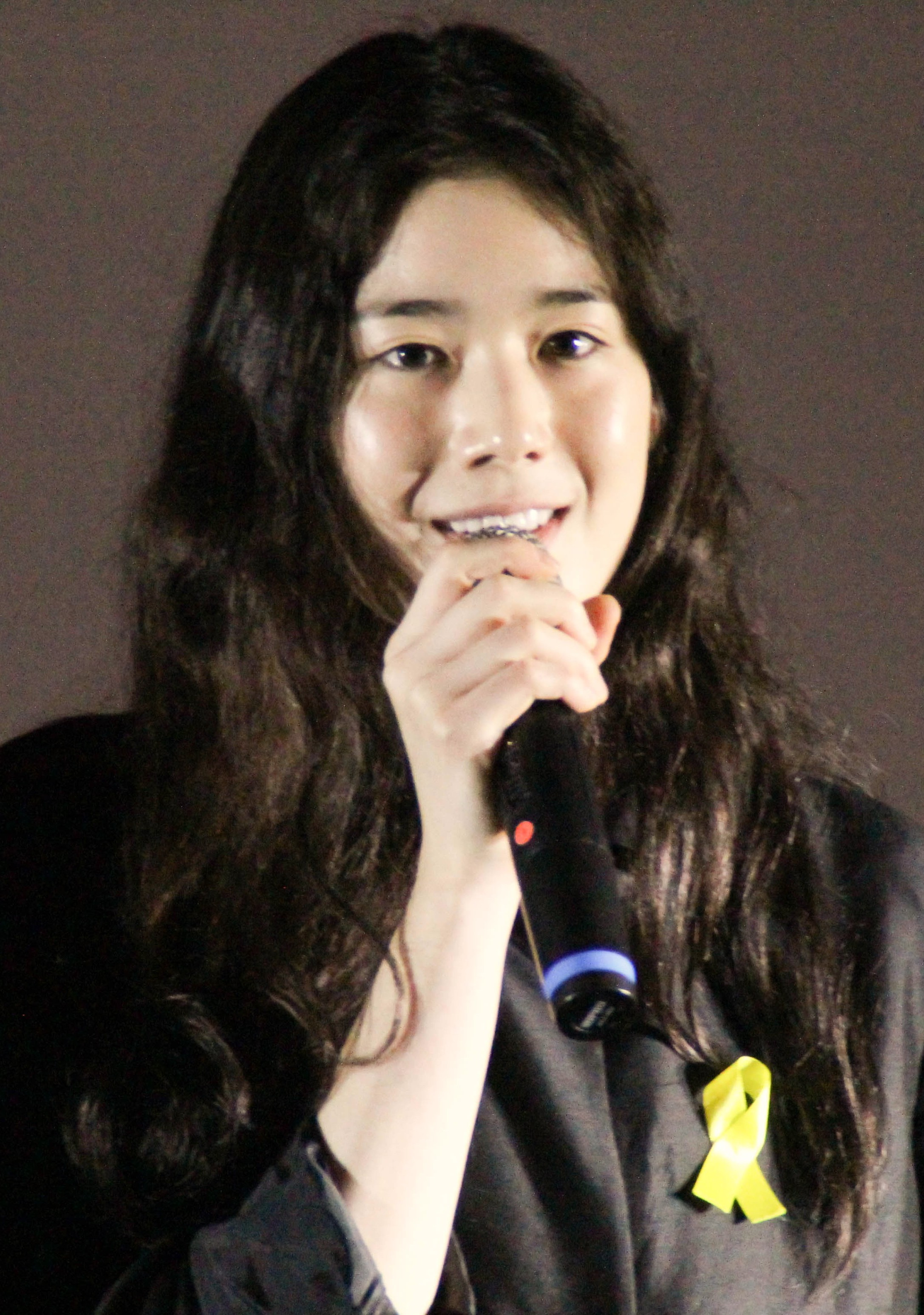
Jung in 2013 (at 34th Blue Dragon Film Awards) and 2014 (during Fatal Encounter press conference)

She made a big comeback to the TV drama in 2018 with two series released on the same year, SBS hit legal crime Return and OCN's The Guest, a drama that combines the elements of exorcism, shamanism, and procedural.

She was later cast as one of the main characters in the 2020 SBS TV series The King: Eternal Monarch. She gained recognition and was declared the best character according to a poll released by Cleo Singapore.

In August 2022, Jung renewed her contract with KeyEast. In 2023, Jung left KeyEast and established a one-man agency, Project Hosoo, with her long-time manager.

Jung was cast as prosecutor in the 2024 ENA's legal crime Your Honor, her first television series after four years. In the same year, she was cast as Moon Ok-gyeong in the television series Jeongnyeon: The Star Is Born, replacing Kim Hieora.

Jung at the 2026 Busan International Film Festival.

In 2026, Jung starred in ENA's mystery legal thriller television series Honour alongside Lee Na-young and Lee Chung-ah. It is based on the Swedish television series Heder which evolves around a 20-year-old secret that the three lawyer friends buried, which resurfaces and throws their lives into chaos.

== Personal life ==
In March 2024, it was confirmed that Jung Eun-chae is in a relationship with artist and product designer Kim Chung-jae. Both born in 1986, the couple has been reported to be in a relationship since 2023.

== Filmography ==
=== Films ===
Year	Title	Role	Notes	Ref.
2010	Haunters	Young-sook		
2011	Play	Eun-chae		
2012	Spring, Snow	Ji-yoon		
2012	Horror Stories	Gong-ji	segment: "Secret Recipe"	
2013	Behind the Camera			
2013	Nobody's Daughter Haewon	Hae-won		
2014	The Fatal Encounter	Kang Wol-hye		
2014	Hill of Freedom	Nam-hee		
2017	The Table	Kyung-jin		
2017	The King	Park Shi-yeon		
2018	The Great Battle	Shi-mi		
2018	Ode to the Goose	Cafe owner	Special appearance	
2023	Someone You Loved	Ah-yeong		

=== Television series ===
Year	Title	Role	Notes	Ref.
2010	Pasta	Waiter Ep 2	Cameo (episode 2)	
2011	KBS Drama Special – "Crossing Yeongdo Bride"	Baek Seol	one act-drama	
2011	My Bittersweet Life	Go Eun-nim		
2013	KBS Drama Special – "Na-ra's Rain"	Moon Na-ra	One act-drama	
2014	Dr. Frost	Yoon Sung-ah		
2018	Return	Geum Na-ra		
2018	The Guest	Kang Gil-yeong		
2019	Legal High	Cameo		
2020	The King: Eternal Monarch	Goo Seo-ryung		
2021	L.U.C.A.: The Beginning	Director Jung	Cameo (Episode 8)	
2024	Your Honor	Kang So-young	Episodes 5-10	
2024	Jeongnyeon: The Star Is Born	Moon Ok-gyeong		
2026	Honour	Kang Shin-jae		
2026	Flex X Cop	Joo Hye-ra	Season 2	

=== Television show ===
Year	Title	Role	Ref.
2013	March: A Story of Friends	Cast member	

=== Web series ===
Year	Title	Role	Notes	Ref.
2022–2024	Pachinko	Kyung Hee	Season 1–2	
2022	Anna	Hyeon-joo		

=== Radio program ===
Year	Title	Role	Notes	Ref.
2018	Film and Music Lover	DJ	April 9, 2018 – June 3, 2018	

=== Music video appearances ===
Year	Song title	Artist
2011	"Heartsore Story"	Wheesung
2012	"Memory of the Wind"	Naul
2013	"Just Smile Like That"	Kwon Sun-kwan
2013	"Sweet Love Virus"	Wonhyoro 1-Ga 13-25
2018	"Looking Back on My Life"	Lee Moon-sae

== Discography ==
=== Extended plays ===
List of extended plays
Title	Details
Jung Eun-chae	Released: April 16, 2013; Label: Mirrorball Music; Formats: CD, digital download, streaming; Track listing: 1. 이방인; 2. 잘 지내나요; 3. 달 4. 소년,소녀 (Boy & Girl) - feat. Thomas Cook; 5. 여름바다 (Summer Sea)

== Accolades ==
=== Awards and nominations ===
Name of the award ceremony, year presented, category, nominee of the award, and the result of the nomination
Award ceremony	Year	Category	Nominee / Work	Result	Ref.
APAN Star Awards	2022	Excellence Award, Actress in an OTT Drama	Anna	Nominated	
APAN Star Awards	2024	Excellence Award, Actress in a Miniseries	Jeongnyeon: The Star Is Born, Your Honor	Won	
Asia Model Awards	2011	CF Model Award	Jung Eun-chae	Won	
Baeksang Arts Awards	2013	Best New Actress – Film	Nobody's Daughter Haewon	Nominated	
Baeksang Arts Awards	2023	Best Supporting Actress – Television	Anna	Nominated	
Baeksang Arts Awards	2025	Best Supporting Actress – Television	Jeongnyeon: The Star Is Born	Nominated	
Blue Dragon Film Awards	2013	Best New Actress	Nobody's Daughter Haewon	Nominated	
Blue Dragon Series Awards	2023	Best Supporting Actress	Anna	Nominated	
Blue Dragon Series Awards	2025	Best Supporting Actress	Your Honor	Nominated	
Buil Film Awards	2013	Best New Actress	Nobody's Daughter Haewon	Won	
Buil Film Awards	2013	Best Actress	Nobody's Daughter Haewon	Nominated	
Busan Film Critics Awards	2013	Best New Actress	Nobody's Daughter Haewon	Won	
Cine21 Film Awards	2013	Female Actress of the Year	Nobody's Daughter Haewon	Won	
Director's Cut Awards	2023	Best Actress in Television	Anna	Nominated	
Jeonju International Film Festival	2013	Moët Rising Star Award	Nobody's Daughter Haewon	Won	
KBS Drama Awards	2011	Best New Actress	My Bittersweet Life	Nominated	
KOFRA Film Awards	2014	Best New Actress	Nobody's Daughter Haewon	Won	
Korean Association of Film Critics Awards	2013	Best New Actress	Nobody's Daughter Haewon	Won	
SBS Drama Awards	2018	Excellence Award, Actress in a Wednesday-Thursday Drama	Return	Nominated	
SBS Drama Awards	2020	Excellence Award, Actress in a Miniseries Fantasy/Romance Drama	The King: Eternal Monarch	Nominated	
Wildflower Film Awards	2014	Best Actress	Nobody's Daughter Haewon	Won	
Wildflower Film Awards	2014	Best New Actor/Actress	Nobody's Daughter Haewon	Nominated	

=== Listicles ===
Name of publisher, year listed, name of listicle, and placement
Publisher	Year	Listicle	Placement	Ref.
Korean Film Council	2021	Korean Actors 200 (Note: Introduces 200 actors that best represent the present and future of Korean cinema to the people in the film industry all over the world)	Included	
