= Nobody's Daughter Haewon =

- Hangul: 누구의 딸도 아닌 해원
- RR: Nuguui ttaldo anin Haewon
- MR: Nuguŭi ttaldo anin Haewŏn
- Directed by: Hong Sang-soo
- Written by: Hong Sang-soo
- Produced by: Kim Kyeong-hee
- Starring: Jung Eun-chae; Lee Sun-kyun
- Narrated by: Jung Eun-chae
- Cinematography: Kim Hyung-koo; Park Hong-yeol
- Edited by: Hahm Sung-won; Son Yeon-ji
- Music by: Jeong Yong-jin
- Production company: Jeonwonsa Films
- Distributed by: Jeonwonsa Films; JoseE Films
- Release dates: February 15, 2013 (Berlinale); February 28, 2013 (South Korea)
- Running time: 90 minutes
- Country: South Korea
- Language: Korean
- Box office: US$252,360

Nobody's Daughter Haewon (Korean: 누구의 딸도 아닌 해원) is a 2013 South Korean drama film written and directed by Hong Sang-soo. The narrative is told in diary format and chronicles a few days in the life of a young woman (Jung Eun-chae) who falls into depression following the departure of her mother to Canada. She falls back on a troubled affair with a professor (Lee Sun-kyun), who offers to whisk her away.

The film made its world premiere and screened in competition at the 63rd Berlin International Film Festival.

The film was selected as part of the 2013 Hong Kong International Film Festival.

It was named #8 on Cahiers du Cinéma's list of top films of 2013.

== Plot ==
On March 21, 2012, on the way to having lunch with her mother Jin-joo (Kim Ja-ok) in Seochon, Jongno District, Seoul, film student and aspiring actress Haewon (Jung Eun-chae) bumps into French actress-singer Jane Birkin in the street and gets her autograph. Birkin says how much Haewon resembles her own daughter, Charlotte Gainsbourg, which pleases Haewon enormously. Immediately afterwards we find out that this meeting was actually a dream, one of several that Haewon is shown to have during the film. Haewon's mother is about to emigrate to Canada and stay with her brother, and asks Haewon about her future plans. Afterwards Haewon walks to Jongno Public Library, past Yoomyung-jang (lit. Hotel Famous) that has special memories for her. Later, in nearby Sajik Park, she meets her married ex-lover Lee Seong-joon (Lee Sun-kyun), a film director who is also her professor at college. They pass a restaurant, where they have already been spotted by his students, and decide to go in and have a meal with them. When Haewon is away from the table, the other students start gossiping about how she is not pure Korean and comes from a wealthy family.

On March 27, Haewon and Seong-joon drive to Namhan Fortress in Gwangju, Gyeonggi, where they get into an argument over how he broke up their relationship and how she had an affair with a fellow student, Jae-hong.

On April 3, Haewon falls asleep in the college library and dreams of a fellow student, Yoo-ran, asking whether she's having an affair with Seong-jun. And then, while strolling around West Village, Haewon bumps into Joong-won (Kim Eui-sung), a professor from San Diego, California, who divorced a year ago and is looking to remarry someone like her. Later, while meeting her friend Yeon-joo (Ye Ji-won) and the latter's boyfriend Joong-sik (Yoo Jun-sang) at Namhan Fortress, she tells them about the meeting. And then Seong-joon calls her, demanding to meet immediately.

== Cast ==
- Jung Eun-chae as Haewon
- Lee Sun-kyun as Lee Seong-joon, a professor of film studies
- Kim Ja-ok as Jin-joo, Haewon's mother
- Kim Eui-sung as Joong-won, a professor from San Diego, California
- Ye Ji-won as Yeon-joo, a friend of Haewon
- Yoo Jun-sang as Joong-sik, a boyfriend of Yeon-joo
- Gi Ju-bong as Hoo-won, a mountain climber
- Ryu Deok-hwan as Dong-joo, a bookseller
- Jane Birkin as herself
- Park Joo-hee as Student
- Ahn Jae-hong as Student 1.

== Awards and nominations ==
2013 Baeksang Arts Awards

- Nomination - Best New Actress - Jung Eun-chae

2013 Buil Film Awards

- Best New Actress - Jung Eun-chae
- Nomination - Best Film
- Nomination - Best Actress - Jung Eun-chae
- Nomination - Best Music - Jeong Yong-jin

2013 Korean Association of Film Critics Awards

- Best New Actress - Jung Eun-chae

2013 Blue Dragon Film Awards

- Nomination - Best New Actress - Jung Eun-chae

2013 Busan Film Critics Awards

- Best New Actress - Jung Eun-chae

2014 KOFRA Film Awards

- Best New Actress - Jung Eun-chae

2014 Wildflower Film Awards

- Best Actress - Jung Eun-chae
- Nomination - Best New Actor/Actress - Jung Eun-chae
