= Montage (2013 film) =

- Hangul: 몽타주
- RR: Mongtaju
- MR: Mongt'aju
- Directed by: Jeong Keun-seob
- Written by: Jeong Keun-seob
- Produced by: Ahn Young-jin; Noh Jae-hoon
- Starring: Uhm Jung-hwa; Kim Sang-kyung; Song Young-chang
- Cinematography: Lee Jong-yeol
- Edited by: Steve M. Choe; Park Kyung-sook
- Music by: Koo Ja-wan; Ahn Hyeon-jin
- Distributed by: Next Entertainment World
- Release date: May 16, 2013
- Running time: 119 minutes
- Country: South Korea
- Language: Korean
- Box office: US$11.23 million

Montage (Korean: 몽타주) is a 2013 South Korean crime thriller film starring Uhm Jung-hwa, Kim Sang-kyung, and Song Young-chang. The movie was remade in India as Te3n in 2016, and in China as The Guilty Ones in 2019.

== Plot ==
A kidnapper disappeared 15 years ago without a trace, leaving behind his dead victim, Seo-jin. Five days before the case's statute of limitations expires, someone is found anonymously leaving a flower at the crime scene. A few days later, another kidnapping takes place using the same method on a similar target. Police team up to solve the case before it's too late as in the previous case. A detective from the previous case (Kim Sang-kyung) is consulted, and he confirms it is a similar MO.

Later, it turns out that the child's grandfather, Han (Song Young-chang), was the perpetrator of the first kidnapping. This was discovered by the mother (Uhm Jung-hwa), so she kidnaps his granddaughter using the same MO. She thought that, by making the culprit go through what she's been through, it would make him confess to his crime. The detectives find out, confront Han and it is revealed that the reason for his kidnapping 15 years ago was to collect ransom money to pay for his daughter's heart surgery. Seo-jin's death turned out to be an accident; she fell to her death after trying to escape from Han. He confesses to his crime and is sentenced to prison for 15 years. Everyone involved in the long-unsolved case finds closure.

== Cast ==
- Uhm Jung-hwa as Ha-kyung
- Kim Sang-kyung as Cheong-ho
- Song Young-chang as Han-chul
- Jo Hee-bong as Detective Kang
- Yoo Seung-mok as Chief detective Kwak
- Lee Jun-hyeok as Chief detective Shin
- Park Chul-min as Section chief Koo
- Jung Hae-kyun as Detective Choi
- Gi Ju-bong as Ear doctor Han
- Oh Dae-hwan as Yong-sik
- Kim Sung-kyung as Seo-jin, Ha-kyung's daughter
- Heo Jung-eun as Bom, Han-chul's granddaughter
- Song Min-ji as Bom's mother

== Awards and nominations ==
Year	Award	Category	Recipient	Result
2013	22nd Buil Film Awards	Best Screenplay	Jeong Keun-seob	Nominated
2013	50th Grand Bell Awards	Best Actress	Uhm Jung-hwa	Won
2013	50th Grand Bell Awards	Best New Director	Jeong Keun-seob	Nominated
2013	50th Grand Bell Awards	Best Screenplay	Jeong Keun-seob	Nominated
2013	34th Blue Dragon Film Awards	Best Actress	Uhm Jung-hwa	Nominated
2013	34th Blue Dragon Film Awards	Best New Director	Jeong Keun-seob	Nominated
2013	21st Korean Culture and Entertainment Awards	Best Actress	Uhm Jung-hwa	Won
2014	19th Chunsa Film Art Awards	Best Actress	Uhm Jung-hwa	Nominated
