= Tae In-ho =

South Korean actor (born 1980)

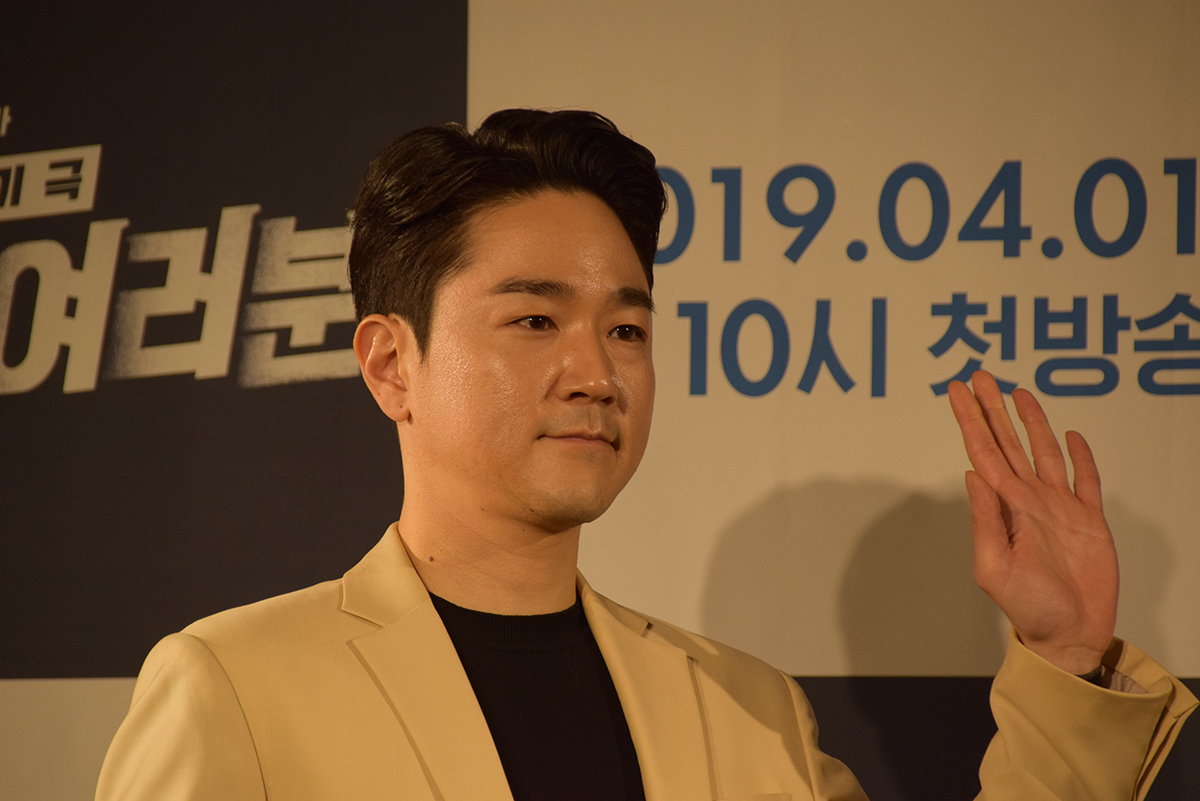
- Tae in April 2019
- Born: May 2, 1980 (age 46); Busan, South Korea
- Occupation: Actor
- Years active: 2002–present
- Agent: Goodman Story Entertainment
- Height: 176 cm (5 ft 9 in)

Korean name
- Hangul: 박상연
- RR: Bak Sangyeon
- MR: Pak Sangyŏn

Stage name
- Hangul: 태인호
- Hanja: 太仁鎬
- RR: Tae Inho
- MR: T'ae Inho

Tae In-ho (born Park Sang-yeon; May 2, 1980) is a South Korean actor. He starred in television series such as Misaeng: Incomplete Life (2014) and Descendants of the Sun (2016).

== Filmography ==
=== Films ===
Year	Title	Role
2002	The Bird Who Stops in the Air	College student]
2004	Low Life	Ddeok Dae's friend
2004	Ghost House	Group member near the police station
2007	Meet Mr. Daddy	Police officer
2008	Crossing	
2008	Truck	
2009	Handphone	
2009	Tidal Wave	
2010	Lady Daddy	Men's suit salesman
2010	Wedding Dress	Resident
2010	Vegetarian	Sang Min
2011	Children	Producer Choi
2011	Perfect Game	
2011	Ohayo Sapporo	
2012	Miss Conspirator	
2012	Dancing Queen	Assistant director
2013	New World	Subordinate 1
2013	Very Ordinary Couple	Instructor
2013	Around The World	Corporal Lee
2014	Ode to My Father	Yoon Ki-jo
2014	Shadow Island	Yeong Do
2015	Director's CUT	Director Hwang Jin-hoo
2015	The Exclusive: Beat the Devil's Tattoo	Team Leader Yoo (Moo Hyeok's boss)
2016	The Map Against The World	Kim Seong-il
2017	VIP	
2018	Feng Shui	
2019	Family Affair (You and Me)	
2019	Juror 8	Presiding judge
2021	Taeil	Animated Film
2022	Transaction Complete	Seok-ho

=== Television series ===
Year	Title	Role	Notes/Ref.
2013	The Blade and Petal	Jang's bodyguard	
2014	Misaeng: Incomplete Life	Assistant Manager Song Jeon Shik	
2015	Let's Eat 2	Lee Joo Seung	(Cameo, Ep.16)
2015	Hello Monster	Yang Seung Hoon	(Guest)
2016	Madame Antoine	Kang Tae Hwa	(Guest, Ep.11-12)
2016	Descendants of the Sun	Han Suk-won	
2016	The Good Wife	Oh Joo-hwan	
2016	Dr. Romantic	Dr. Moon Tae-hwa	(Special appearance, Ep.1)
2017	Man to Man	Seo Ki-cheol	
2017–2018	Rain or Shine	Jung Yoo-taek	
2017-2020	Stranger	Kim Byung-hyun	
2018	Welcome to Waikiki	Kim Jae-woo	(guest, Ep. 11–12)
2018	Life	Sunwoo Chang	
2018	About Time	Park Sung-bin	
2019	My Fellow Citizens!	Han Sang-jin	
2019	Confession		
2020	The King: Eternal Monarch	Chairman Choe	
2020	Soul Mechanic	In Dong-hyuk	
2020	Mystic Pop-up Bar	Kang In-ho	(Cameo, Ep. 6)
2021	Sisyphus: The Myth	Eddie Kim / Seung-bok Kim	
2021	Hometown	Son Ji-seung	
2022	Ghost Doctor	Han Seung-won	
2022	Crazy Love		cameo
2022	The Empire	Nam Soo-hyuk	
2022	May I Help You?	Im Il-seop	

=== Web series ===
Year	Title	Role	Ref.
2022	Kiss Sixth Sense	Oh Seung-taek	

== Awards and nominations ==
Name of the award ceremony, year presented, category, nominee of the award, and the result of the nomination
Award ceremony	Year	Category	Nominee / Work	Result	Ref.
Scene Stealer Festival	2023	Bonsang (Main Prize)	Kiss Sixth Sense; May I Help You?	Won	
