= Kim Byung-woo =

South Korean filmmaker

- Born: 1980 (age 45–46); Busan, South Korea
- Education: Hanyang University
- Occupations: Film director; film editor; producer; screenwriter
- Spouse: Hahm Eun-jung (m. 2025)

Korean name
- Hangul: 김병우
- RR: Gim Byeongu
- MR: Kim Pyŏngu

Kim Byung-woo (Korean: 김병우; born 1980) is a South Korean screenwriter and film director. He is best known for directing the film The Terror Live (2013).

== Personal life ==
Kim majored in Theater & Film at Hanyang University.

On October 16, 2025, it was confirmed that Kim would marry actress and singer Hahm Eun-jung in November. The couple married on November 30, 2025.

== Career ==
Kim is known for making inventive and self-funded films.

In 2001, he made his first five-minute short film Cry on digital video on a shoestring budget.

In 2003, he made his feature debut when he was still a theatre and film student at Hanyang University. The film Anamorphic has the main character searching for a way out after passing through gates and doors into a shadowy netherworld. He self-funded the project at the cost of US$4,000.

In 2007, his second feature Written, propelled his standing in Korean independent cinema to a new level. Written is a film within a film where the lead character is caught in a hellish predicament when his fate as a character in a script is being determined by others. The self-funded film was shot on high-definition video and cost only US$15,000 to make.

== Filmography ==
Year	Title	Original title	Credited as			Notes
Year	Title	Original title	Director	Writer	Producer	Notes
2001	Cry	-	-	-	-	Short film
2003	Anamorphic	아나모픽	Yes	Yes	Yes	Also editor
2008	Written	리튼	Yes	Yes	Yes	Also editor
2013	The Terror Live	더 테러 라이브	Yes	Yes	No	
2018	Take Point	PMC: 더 벙커	Yes	Yes	No	
2025	Omniscient Reader: The Prophecy	전지적 독자 시점	Yes	Yes	No	
2025	The Great Flood	대홍수	Yes	Yes	No	

== Awards ==
- 2013 14th Busan Film Critics Awards: Best New Director (The Terror Live)
- 2013 22nd Buil Film Awards: Best New Director (The Terror Live)
- 2013 22nd Buil Film Awards: Best Screenplay (The Terror Live)
- 2013 34th Blue Dragon Film Awards: Best New Director (The Terror Live)
