= Man of Will =

- Theatrical release poster
- Hangul: 대장 김창수
- Lit.: Commander Kim Chang-soo
- RR: Daejang Gim Changsu
- MR: Taejang Kim Ch'angsu
- Directed by: Lee Won-tae
- Written by: Lee Won-tae
- Produced by: Kim Young-ho
- Starring: Cho Jin-woong; Song Seung-heon
- Cinematography: Hong Jae-sik
- Edited by: Kim Chang-ju
- Music by: Kim Hyeong-seok
- Production companies: BA Entertainment; Movie Square Pictures; Wontak Pictures
- Distributed by: Kidari Ent
- Release date: October 19, 2017 (South Korea)
- Running time: 115 minutes
- Country: South Korea
- Language: Korean
- Box office: US$2.7 million

Man of Will (Korean: 대장 김창수) is a 2017 South Korean historical biographical drama film directed by Lee Won-tae, starring Cho Jin-woong and Song Seung-heon.

The film was based on a novel and portrays roughly two years of the life of Korean independence activist Kim Ku, who went by the name "Kim Chang-soo" during the time period depicted in the film. Specifically, the film covers the Chihapo incident (Korean: 치하포사건; Hanja: 鵄河浦事件), in which Kim murdered a Japanese man who he believed may have participated in the assassination of the Korean Empress Myeongseong. It also depicts his trial, imprisonment, and subsequent escape from prison.

The film was released on October 19, 2017 and earned just $2.7 million in box offices.

== Plot ==
In 1896, in the town of Chihapo (now in modern North Korea), Joseon, Kim Chang-soo murders a Japanese man who he believes may have been an assassin of Empress Myeongseong. Before he leaves the crime scene, he leaves a note with his confession to the crime written on it.

Later, he is imprisoned, put on trial, and eventually moved to a prison in Incheon. There, Kim sees that the prisoners are uneducated and impoverished, that many are convicted on false charges that they are too uneducated to protect themselves from. He begins teaching dozens of prisoners and even prison staff how to read and write. This helps the prisoners clear their false charges and the staff better petition for resources from the government. His lessons prove popular, and his reputation dramatically improves.

Kim and others are forced to work on constructing some of the earliest railways in Korea. Working conditions are poor, and many are injured. During this time, his educational activities draw the particular ire of the prison director and Japanese sympathizer Kang Hyung-sik. Kang personally beats both the prisoners and prison staff, although when he attempts to beat Kim, he encounters resistance from Kim's new allies. Kang also secretly embezzles funds from the construction projects.

Meanwhile, Japanese consular agents push the Korean government to execute Kim. Kim is scheduled to be executed by hanging, and the prison staff begrudgingly comply with the order. However, moments before his execution, an order from Gojong of Joseon arrives that saves Kim's life. Apparently, the prisoners and staff who learned to read and write from Kim had sent a petition to Gojong, begging for Kim's life to be spared. The emperor sends Kim a letter, personally thanking him for attempting to avenge the Empress's death.

On 19 March 1898, Kim and several companions manage to escape from the prison, thanks to the guards turning a blind eye towards them. Kang is furious and beats the prison staff, demanding that they be found. Shortly afterwards, the same Joseon official that conveyed the order to save Kim's life enters Kang's office with evidence of Kang's corruption, and has Kang arrested.

In the final scene, Kim's appearance changes while walking away from the prison, symbolizing his change from Kim Chang-soo to the activist Kim Gu.

== Historical accuracy ==
Many elements in the film are fictionalized, including most minor characters. Lee justified the changes by saying that meticulously-accurate history usually had weak popular influence and remained confined in museums.

Most notably, most scholars agree that the man Kim murdered was a Japanese civilian who had nothing to do with the murder of Empress Myeongseong. Lee described the innocence of Tsuchida as less important than the general frustration and anger of the populace towards the Japanese.

While it is true that the first railroads were being constructed in Incheon around the time portrayed in the film, there's no evidence Kim was involved in the construction of them. In fact, Kim was only forced to labor during his second imprisonment more than a decade after the time portrayed in the film, and on a harbor. Director/writer Lee said he fictionalized this element to respond to a common justification of Japanese imperialism in Korea. In particular, he wanted to emphasize how Japan's forced modernization efforts, in which thousands worked and died in slavery-like conditions, created projects that outwardly seemed beneficial to Korea but in actuality were intended to enrich the Japanese.

In addition, no petitions were sent to Gojong in order to spare Kim's life. Lee claims that Gojong spared Kim simply because of a lack of evidence.

Also, Kim did not actually adopt the name "Kim Gu" around the time period of the movie. He was actually imprisoned twice in his life; the imprisonment the film is based on was the first incident, and it was during his second imprisonment that he changed his name.

== Cast ==
=== Main ===
- Cho Jin-woong as Kim Chang-soo

A Korean independence fighter and the last leader of the Korean provisional government during Japan's colonial occupation in Shanghai.

- Song Seung-heon as Kang Hyung-sik

Prison Director

- Jung Jin-young as Go Jin-sa

Prisoner who is sitting on the death row as a result of leading a Donghak peasantry movement.

- Jung Man-sik as Ma Sang-goo

A fellow prisoner

=== Supporting ===
- Shin Jung-geun as Jo Duk-pal
- Yoo Seung-mok as Lee Young-dal
- Jung Gyu-soo as Yang Won-jong
- Jeon Bae-soo as Park Dong-goo
- Kim Jae-young as Kim Sang-no
- Lee Seo-won as Kim Chun-dong
- Kim Yoon-sung as Na Choon-bae
- Kwak Dong-yeon as Choi Yoon-suk
- Bae Jin-woong as Choi Jak-doo
- Hiromitsu Takeda as Watanabe
- Yoon Byung-hee as Hwang Bong-goo
- Lee Tae-il as Kim Man-cheol
- Lee Soon-won as Cheon Jong-soo
- Yeom Hye-ran as Visitor

=== Special appearance ===
- Lee Sun-kyun as Go Jong
- Park So-dam as Yeong-hee

== Production ==
The film is the debut of director Lee Won-tae, who wrote the 2015 period film The Magician and produced the 2011 horror romantic-comedy Spellbound.

Lee said he first thought of creating the film after visiting one of the original offices of the Korean Provisional Government (KPG) in Shanghai while on a family vacation in winter of 2012. Knowing the history of Kim and the KPG, he wanted to share it with others so they could be similarly moved by visiting historic sites like that. He chose to focus on a moment from Kim's youth, as it was less commonly represented in films about Kim and provided a relatable experience for younger viewers. In addition, Lee claimed he created the film to address debates about the legacy of Japanese colonialism in Korea that remained unresolved as of the creation of the film.

Principal photography began on October 31, 2016. Filming concluded on 31 January 2017.

== Release and reception ==
A press conference was held on September 12, 2017 at the CGV Apgujeong theater in Seoul. It was attended by the main cast. The film was released in local cinemas on October 19, 2017.

On its opening weekend the film came in third at the local box office, selling 201,279 tickets and earned US$1.42 million, increasing the total ticket sales to 260,189 and US$1.8 million in revenue over four days.

=== Reception ===
Critics praised the lead actors, but criticized the story and the unconvincing use of musical cues to evoke particular emotions from the audience. Several noted the similarities between this film and the 1994 film The Shawshank Redemption, which also took place in a prison and portrayed prisoners sympathetically.
