= Payback: Money and Power =

2023 South Korean television series

- Promotional poster
- Hangul: 법쩐
- Hanja: 法쩐
- Lit.: Law Money
- RR: Beopjjeon
- MR: Pŏptchŏn
- Genre: Revenge; Thriller; Legal drama; Action; Crime
- Developed by: Studio S (planning)
- Written by: Kim Won-seok
- Directed by: Lee Won-tae
- Starring: Lee Sun-kyun; Moon Chae-won; Kang You-seok; Park Hoon
- Music by: Park Se-joon
- Country of origin: South Korea
- Original language: Korean
- No. of episodes: 12

Production
- Executive producers: Lee Kwang-soon; Kang Byeong-guk (CP)
- Producers: Yoo Hong-gu; Kim Min-tae; Park Hee-don; Jung Soon-tae
- Production company: Red Nine Pictures

Original release
- Network: SBS TV
- Release: January 6 – February 11, 2023

Payback: Money and Power (Korean: 법쩐) is a 2023 South Korean television series starring Lee Sun-kyun, Moon Chae-won, Kang You-seok, and Park Hoon. It aired on SBS TV from January 6 to February 11, 2023, every Friday and Saturday at 22:00 (KST).

== Synopsis ==
The series follows the story of people who risk everything to fight the money cartel that colluded with the law. They refuse to remain silent in the face of incompetent and unjust power, and fight passionately in their own way.

== Cast ==
=== Main ===
- Lee Sun-kyun as Eun Yong, a money trader who is the owner and head of investment of a global private equity fund.
  - Yoon Jeong-il as young Eun Yong
- Moon Chae-won as Park Joon-kyung, a former prosecutor and a military judicial officer who passed the bar exam and graduated from the training institute with top scores.
  - Han Dong-hee as young Park Joon-kyung
- Kang You-seok as Jang Tae-chun, Yong's nephew who is a prosecutor.
- Park Hoon as Hwang Ki-seok, a chief prosecutor.

=== Supporting ===
- Kim Hong-pa as Myung In-joo, godfather of the underground economy who built a cartel of greed.
- Kim Mi-sook as Yoon Hye-rin, Joon-kyung's mother.
- Seo Jeong-yeon as Eun Ji-hee, Tae-chun's mother and Yong's older sister.
  - Park Hwan-hee as young Eun Ji-hee
- Kim Hye-hwa as Hong Han-na, Yong's partner who is a lobbyist-turned-private equity fund representative.
- Choi Deok-moon as Nam Sang-il, a veteran prosecution investigator.
- Choi Jung-in as Ham Jin, a prosecutor at the Supreme Prosecutors' Office.
- Lee Ki-young as Oh Chang-hyun, former chief of the Seoul District Prosecutors' Office.
- Son Eun-seo as Myung Se-hee, In-joo's daughter and Ki-seok's wife.
- Choi Min-chul as Park Jung-soo, the chief prosecutor of the 5th Detective Division.
- Park Jung-pyo as Lee Young-jin, Ki-seok's right-hand man and chief prosecutor of the Seoul Central District Prosecutors' Office.
- Kwon Hyuk as Lee Su-dong, In-joo's partner.
- Won Hyun-joon as Lee Jin-ho, a capital market thug and Yong's old friend from juvenile detention center.
  - Kim Kyung-ho as young Lee Jin-ho
- Lee Geon-myung as Kim Seong-tae, In-joo's right-hand man.
- Kwon Tae-won as Baek In-soo, a former prosecutor and a member of the National Assembly.
- Jo Young-jin as Son Seung-jin, a politician.

=== Extended ===
- Kim Jae-rok as President Park
- Seo Ji-hoon as Cha Dong-jin

=== Special appearance ===
- Lee Jung-bin as Kim Ju-hyeon

== Production ==
Filming was scheduled to begin in July 2022.

== Viewership ==
Payback : South Korea viewers per episode (millions)

Season	Episode number												Average
Season	1	2	3	4	5	6	7	8	9	10	11	12	Average
1	1.582	1.392	1.607	1.697	1.798	1.293	1.992	2.008	2.016	1.793	2.084	1.971	1.769

Source: Audience measurement performed nationwide by Nielsen Korea.

Average TV viewership ratings
Ep.	Original broadcast date	Average audience share		
Ep.	Original broadcast date	Nielsen Korea		TNmS
Ep.	Original broadcast date	Nationwide	Seoul	Nationwide
1	January 6, 2023	8.7% (4th)	9.6% (4th)	6.4% (10th)
2	January 7, 2023	7.4% (3rd)	8.3% (3rd)	6.4% (6th)
3	January 13, 2023	8.7% (3rd)	8.9% (3rd)	8.3% (6th)
4	January 14, 2023	9.6% (2nd)	10.1% (2nd)	N/A
5	January 20, 2023	9.5% (3rd)	9.7% (3rd)	8.1% (7th)
6	January 21, 2023	7.1% (3rd)	7.5% (2nd)	7.3% (2nd)
7	January 27, 2023	11.1% (3rd)	11.6% (2nd)	N/A
8	January 28, 2023	10.7% (2nd)	10.7% (2nd)	9.2% (2nd)
9	February 3, 2023	11.1% (3rd)	11.1% (3rd)	10.4% (3rd)
10	February 4, 2023	9.5% (2nd)	9.9% (2nd)	8.6% (2nd)
11	February 10, 2023	11.4% (3rd)	11.8% (3rd)	9.7% (3rd)
12	February 11, 2023	11.1% (2nd)	10.8% (3rd)	10.2% (2nd)
Average		9.7%	10.0%	8.5% (Note: This average rating is calculated based on the published ratings. The exact average rating is unknown due to multiple unpublished ratings.)
In the table above, the blue numbers represent the lowest ratings and the red numbers represent the highest ratings.; N/A denotes ratings that were not published.

== Awards and nominations ==
Name of the award ceremony, year presented, category, nominee of the award, and the result of the nomination
Award ceremony	Year	Category	Nominee	Result	Ref.
APAN Star Awards	2023	Excellence Award, Actress in a Medium-Length Drama	Moon Chae-won	Nominated	
Consumer Day KCA Culture Entertainment Awards	2023	Drama Category – Viewers' Choice Actor of the Year	Moon Chae-won	Won	
SBS Drama Awards	2023	Best New Actor	Kang You-seok	Won	
SBS Drama Awards	2023	Top Excellence Award, Actress in a Miniseries Action / Genre Drama	Moon Chae-won	Won	
SBS Drama Awards	2023	Excellence Award, Actor in a Miniseries Action / Genre Drama	Park Hoon	Nominated	
SBS Drama Awards	2023	Excellence Award, Actress in a Miniseries Action / Genre Drama	Son Eun-seo	Nominated	
SBS Drama Awards	2023	Best Supporting Actress in a Miniseries Action / Genre Drama	Kim Hye-hwa	Nominated	
