= The Witch: Part 2. The Other One =

2022 film by Park Hoon-jung

- Promotional poster
- Hangul: 마녀 Part2. The Other One
- Hanja: 魔女 Part2. The Other One
- RR: Manyeo Part2. The Other One
- MR: Manyŏ Part2. The Other One
- Directed by: Park Hoon-jung
- Written by: Park Hoon-jung
- Produced by: Park Hoon-jung; Shin Min-kyung
- Starring: Shin Si-ah; Park Eun-bin; Seo Eun-soo; Jin Goo; Sung Yoo-bin; Jo Min-su
- Cinematography: Kim Young-ho; Kim Hong-mok
- Edited by: Jang Rae-won
- Music by: Mowg
- Production companies: Goldmoon; Peppermint&company, Inc.
- Distributed by: Next Entertainment World
- Release date: June 15, 2022
- Running time: 137 minutes
- Country: South Korea
- Language: Korean
- Box office: US$23.4 million

The Witch: Part 2. The Other One (Korean: 마녀(魔女) Part2. The Other One) is a 2022 South Korean science fiction action horror film written and directed by Park Hoon-jung. A sequel to his 2018 film The Witch: Part 1. The Subversion, it features a large, altered cast, starring Shin Si-ah, Park Eun-bin and Jo Min-su. Shin plays Ark 1, the twin sister of Goo Ja-yoon, the "witch" from the first film. The film was released on June 15, 2022, by Next Entertainment World.

The Witch: Part 2 is the seventh highest-grossing Korean film of 2022 with a gross of US$23.4 million and over 2.8 million viewers.

== Plot ==
Years ago, a female teenager is taking a bus ride with her friend when they mysteriously change routes. Gas is thrown into the bus, causing everyone inside the vehicle to lose consciousness. A team abducts the young woman who wakes up on a stretcher, seeing that the bus incident was faked to look like an accident. Dr. Baek and her twin reassure her, knowing that she is pregnant with fraternal twins, that her pregnancy will be mysteriously important.

In the present day, a girl nicknamed Ark 1 escapes from a secret laboratory after killing all soldiers and scientists there. She gets lost in the forest, hearing her mother's voice calling her. She is then kidnapped by the henchmen of the dangerous gangster Yong-doo as they pass on the road in a van. Kyung-hee, another abductee, is there because she refuses to give up ownership of her house to Yong-doo. Along the way, the girl causes an accident after one of the henchmen ends up touching her. Kyung-hee takes the girl with her and calls her uncle for help.

Her uncle performs surgery on Ark 1 to remove all the experimental devices from her skin. Kyung-hee ends up taking the girl with her to her house, where she lives with her brother, Dae-gil. Meanwhile, Dr. Baek receives a visit from Jang, the head of the secret institute. They both talk about the girl who escaped at the Jeju Island coastal base, where Jang deploys a tactical team to solve the problem secretly. At night, Yong-doo and his gang threaten Kyung-hee into giving him the deed to her father's property, revealing that he was murdered by Yong-doo. The girl appears and defeats most of the henchmen with her brute strength, causing Yong-doo to flee in terror. An agent named Jo-hyeon and her right hand man, Tom, are called in to speak with Baek, who offers them a device that can track Ark 1. Yong-doo, not happy with what happened, tortures Kyung-hee's uncle for more information about the girl.

During the trip to the market, Kyung-hee discovers that her uncle is injured and goes out to help him. When she returns to the car, she finds Jo-hyeon and Tom, who shows footage of the girl killing everyone before the escape and asks her to help them stop Ark 1. Yong-doo meets with Jang's squad when reporting the girl's presence to his partners in crime, where he ends up receiving a dose of their power in exchange for revealing the location of the girl. Kyung-hee arrives home with instructions to leave with her brother as soon as a fireworks show takes place, but before that happens, Yong-doo arrives with his gang and Jang's squad. Kyung-hee dies while trying to buy time for Dae-gil and Ark 1 to escape, being killed with a fatal shot in the process.

Jo-Hyeon's tactical forces fire a bazooka to kill the girl on the roof, but she manages to escape. Dae-gil survives the house explosion, but dies soon after by Yong-doo upon seeing his sister's body. The gang, Jo-Hyeon and Tom are killed by the squad before being attacked by the girl. Yong-doo ends up having his feet broken by Ark 1, leaving him incapacitated despite the superhuman dose he received. She enters a fight against the last two members of the tactical force, where she disintegrates one of them with her telekinesis. Goo Ja-yoon arrives by car and finishes off the last survivor of the chaos, before revealing to Ark 1 that they are sisters and that she has been monitoring her since her escape. Ja-yoon says she needs her to find their mother, as she has a stronger psychic bond with the girl. Ark 1 doesn't respond, focusing her attention on the loss of Dae-gil and Kyung-hee, watching Yong-do slowly die. Ja-yoon injects her sister with a tranquilizer and puts her in the car, driving away from the scene together.

At the end of the film, Baek senses the danger the sisters now have together before being shown their mother inside a huge aquarium with wires connected to it. The woman opens her eyes and the screen goes dark.

A post-credits scene reveals that Jo-hyeon and Tom survived the chaos, and are joined by more "witches" in order to track Ja-yoon and her sister.

== Cast ==
- Shin Si-ah as a girl (official name: 'Ark 1 Datum point')
- Park Eun-bin as Kyung-hee
- Seo Eun-soo as Jo-hyeon, a head office agent who goes out to get rid of the girl
- Jin Goo as Yong-du, the boss of an organization that disturbs the peaceful daily life of the siblings Kyung-hee and Dae-gil.
- Sung Yoo-bin as Dae-gil, Kyung-hee's younger brother and girl's (Ark 1) only friend.
- Jo Min-su as Dr. Baek, Dr. Baek's twin sister
- Cha Soon-bae as Byeon Park
- Justin John Harvey as Tom, a foreign agent and Jo-hyeon's partner
- Byeon Seo-yoon as Mi-young
- Chae Won-bin as Tou girl 1
- Seo Yi Ra as Tou girl 2
- Jung La-el as Tou girl 3
- Kim Ki-hae as Tou pretty boy
- Lee Jong-suk as Jang, head of a secret research institute that pursues the whereabouts of the missing girl.
- Kim Da-mi as Goo Ja-yoon, a witch
- Uhm Tae-goo as a Mart customer

== Production ==
At the 23rd Busan International Film Festival on October 5, 2018, the director Park Hoon-jung and actor Kim Da-mi attending the stage greetings for the film The Witch: Part 1. The Subversion announced the sequel. On being asked about the sequel he explained, "As those who have seen it, expect it, but it will be the story after that shown in the movie."

Shin Si-ah auditioned for the role of the protagonist in the summer of 2020, and was selected after beating 1,408 others. Lee Jong-suk after finishing his military duty in 2020, made a comeback with a role in this film. Warner Bros. Korea, the holders of 'Witch' license, signed a contract with Next Entertainment World (NEW) for director Park Hoon-jung's next film: Witch 2. NEW made the investment and will also distribute the film. The original crew of The Witch: Part 1 joined in this version too. Apart from director Park Hoon-jung, cinematographer Kim Young-ho, art directors Hwa Seong, Choi Hyun-seok, to the martial arts director Kim Jung-min are working together. Park Eun-bin is coming back to big screen after nine years, since her last appearance was in 2013 film Secretly, Greatly.

Filming began in the late December 2020 and was wrapped up on April 19, 2021. The Witch: Part 2. was filmed on Jeju Island, which was the backdrop for the ending scene of The Witch: Part 1. Jeju Stone Culture Park and the Glass House, located in Seopjikoji, were filming sites where crucial scenes were filmed.

== Release and promotion ==
The film release which was scheduled for April was postponed due to COVID-19. It was released theatrically on June 15, 2022, in South Korea.

The film is promoted with some unique ways adopted by distributors. Some of the online and offline promotional methods have attracted attention of the people. From May 9, the official website of the film provided confidential information related to the 'girl' (Shin Si-a) who escaped the secret laboratory. In addition, it is planning first-class confidential fan art contest that runs until June 6. From May 16, the bus stops around Gangnam and the bus stop on Gangnam-daero from Sinsa station to Yangjae station were occupied by the advertisement installed as lenticular, giving impression of a 'Witch Road', attracted attention of people visiting the area.

The film has been sold in 124 countries around the world and it will be simultaneously released in 11 countries along with domestic release.

The film was invited to the 26th Fantasia International Film Festival and was screened for its Quebec premiere on July 29, 2022.

The film entered the international competition section of the 40th Brussels International Fantastic Film Festival and was screened for European premiere on September 5, 2022.

=== Home media ===
The film was made available for streaming on IPTV (KT olleh TV, SK Btv, LG U+ TV), Home Choice, Google Play, TVING, WAVVE, Naver TV, KT skylife, and Cinefox from July 14, 2022.

== Reception ==
=== Box office ===
The film was released on June 15 on 1,796 screens. It opened at 1st place with 266,526 admissions at the Korean box office, and crossed 1 million cumulative admissions on the fourth day. It took 11 days to cross 2 million viewers, and 18 days to cross 2.5 million viewers.

As of January 7, 2023 it is at 6th place among all the Korean films released in the year 2022 with gross of US$22,954,356 and 2,806,501 admissions.

=== Critical response ===
The review aggregator website Rotten Tomatoes reported a 75% approval rating, based on 12 reviews with an average rating of 6.30/10.

Kim Young-sik of Within News reviewing the film wrote, that the "appearance of the Absolute who is stronger than the strong one" has "completed the basic character build-up of the 'witch' worldview." Kim praised the performances of Seo Eun-soo and Jin Goo writing, "Actors Seo Eun-soo and Jin Goo's big performances in saving the main characters are also a highlight of this work." Concluding review Kim stated, "The film is a work like burning oil that makes you look forward to the upcoming 3rd installment by inserting an expanded worldview into the film." Kim further stated, "In addition, the film shows the audience an expanded worldview with the advent of a new absolute. The story structure has been simplified compared to the first part, and the characters are also at the expected level, but the Absolute Girl's ability will exceed the audience's expectations. Meagan Navarro of Bloody Disgusting rated the film 3.5 out of 5 and criticised the weak narrative, writing, "While the narrative may fare much weaker this round," but appreciated the director Park Hoon-jung's "knack for strong visuals and staging, late-game revelations." Praising the climax Navarro wrote, "The Other One does move the needle forward and opens up intriguing new possibilities for the third chapter." Roger Moore film critic rated the film with 2 stars out of 5 and found the film tardy and lengthy. Moore wrote, "Park Hoon-jung's everything-but-the-Korean-kitchen-sink sequel to 2018's The Witch... a simple, slow-moving witch-hunt story whose clutter keeps it from ever truly getting up to speed."

== Accolades ==
Award	Date of ceremony	Category	Recipient(s)	Result	Ref(s)
Blue Dragon Film Awards	25 November 2022	Best Supporting Actress	Seo Eun-soo	Nominated	
Blue Dragon Film Awards	25 November 2022	Best New Actress	Shin Si-ah	Nominated	
Brussels International Fantastic Film Festival	September 10, 2022	Golden Raven	The Witch: Part 2. The Other One	Nominated	
Chunsa Film Art Awards	30 September 2022	Best New Actress	Shin Si-ah	Nominated	
Grand Bell Awards	9 December 2022	Best New Actress	Shin Si-ah	Nominated	
Grand Bell Awards	9 December 2022	Best Music	Mowg	Nominated	
Grand Bell Awards	9 December 2022	Best Visual Effects	Jo Young-seok, Jang Min-jae	Nominated	
30th Korea Culture Entertainment Awards	2022	Best Actor Award	Jin Goo	Won	
