= Black Knight (South Korean TV series) =

2023 South Korean Netflix TV series

- Promotional poster
- Hangul: 택배기사
- Hanja: 宅配技士
- Lit.: Delivery Driver
- RR: Taekbaegisa
- MR: T'aekpaegisa
- Genre: Science fiction; Dystopian; Action
- Based on: Black Knight by Lee Yun-kyun
- Developed by: Netflix
- Written by: Cho Ui-seok
- Directed by: Cho Ui-seok
- Starring: Kim Woo-bin; Song Seung-heon; Kang You-seok; Esom
- Music by: Primary
- Country of origin: South Korea
- Original language: Korean
- No. of episodes: 6

Production
- Production company: Project 318
- Budget: ₩25 billion

Original release
- Network: Netflix
- Release: May 12, 2023

Black Knight (Korean: 택배기사) is a 2023 South Korean television series written and directed by Cho Ui-seok, starring Kim Woo-bin, Song Seung-heon, Kang You-seok, and Esom. Based on the webtoon of the same title by Lee Yun-kyun, it depicts a dystopian future where extensive air pollution has become a huge problem after a comet destroyed most of the world and forced survivors to depend on oxygen tanks and masks dropped off by a cadre of elite delivery drivers. It was released on Netflix on May 12, 2023.

== Cast ==
=== Main ===
- Kim Woo-bin as '5-8'

A legendary delivery driver with the number 5-8.

- Song Seung-heon as Ryu Seok

The wealthy heir to the Cheonmyeong Group who has become wealthy and powerful by controlling oxygen sales.

- Kang You-seok as Yoon Sa-wol
  - Choi Seung-hoon as young Sa-wol

A refugee boy who admires '5-8' and dreams of following in his footsteps as one of the Knights.

- Esom as Jeong Seol-ah

A military intelligence officer of the Defense Intelligence Command and Sa-wol's older adoptive sister.

=== Supporting ===
- Kim Eui-sung as Grandpa

An all-around mechanic who can fix almost anything and Sa-wol's longtime guardian.

- Jin Kyung as Chae Jin-kyung

The President of South Korea.

- Nam Kyung-eup as Ryu Jae-jin

The Chairman of the Cheonmyeong Group, and Ryu Seok's father.

- Lee Sung-wook as Oh Jin-hwan

The director of Cheonmyeong Group, and Ryu Seok's assistant.

- Roh Yoon-seo as Jeong Seul-ah
  - Kim Ah-hyun as young Seul-ah

Seol-ah's younger sister who lives together with Sa-wol.

- Lee Joo-seung as Useless

Sa-wol's refugee friend.

- Jung Eun-seong as Dummy

Sa-wol's refugee friend.

- Lee Sang-jin as Dumb-Dumb

Sa-wol's refugee friend.

- Kim Min as Joo Kyung-nam

One of the competitors for the new Knight selection.

- Cho Ji-seung as Hyun Soo

One of the competitors for the new Knight selection.

==== Cheonmyeong Group Knights ====
- Lee E-dam as '4-1'
- Bae Yoo-ram as '5-7'
- Lee Soon-won as '3-3'
- Heo Hyung-kyu as '1-3'
- Bae Myung-jin as '2-4'
- Yoo In-hyuk as '4-2'
- Jang Mi-kwan as '5-2'
- Yoo Hyuk-jae as '8-9'
- Yang Jung-doo as '8-2'
- Han Sang-gil as '7-3'
- Zo Zee-an as '6-3'

== Episodes ==
No.	Title	Directed by	Written by	Original release date
1	"Episode 1"	Cho Ui-seok	Cho Ui-seok	May 12, 2023
2	"Episode 2"	Cho Ui-seok	Cho Ui-seok	May 12, 2023
3	"Episode 3"	Cho Ui-seok	Cho Ui-seok	May 12, 2023
4	"Episode 4"	Cho Ui-seok	Cho Ui-seok	May 12, 2023
5	"Episode 5"	Cho Ui-seok	Cho Ui-seok	May 12, 2023
6	"Episode 6"	Cho Ui-seok	Cho Ui-seok	May 12, 2023

== Reception ==
On the review aggregator website Rotten Tomatoes, 69% of 11 critics' reviews are positive, with an average rating of 6.6/10.
