= Choi Min-chul =

South Korean actor

Choi Min-cheol
- Born: November 9, 1976 (age 49); Gwangju, South Korea
- Education: Chung-Ang University – Department of Voice Music
- Occupation: Actor
- Years active: 2000–present
- Agent: PL Entertainment

Korean name
- Hangul: 최민철
- Hanja: 催民喆
- RR: Choe Mincheol
- MR: Ch'oe Minch'ŏl

Choi Min-chul (born November 9, 1976) is a South Korean actor. He starred in film such as Way Back Home (2013) and The Throne (2015).

== Filmography ==
=== Film ===
Year	Title	Role	Ref.
2004	Low Life	Detective 2	
2008	Go Go 70s	Dong-so	
2011	White: Melody of Death	Choi Shil-gon	
2011	Perfect Game	Kim Il-kwon	
2013	Way Back Home	Seo Moon-do	
2015	Love Never Fails	Park Dong-shik	
2015	The Throne	Chae Je-gong	
2019	The Gangster, The Cop, The Devil	Kwon Oh-sung	
2021	Lady Gambler		
2023	The Devil's Deal	manager	

=== Television series ===
Year	Title	Role	Ref.
2014	God's Gift: 14 Days	Hwang Kyung-soo	
2014	KBS Drama Special: That Kind of Love	Jong Ho	
2015	Oh My Ghost	Jo Dong-chul	
2015	Sweet, Savage Family	Kang Sung-goo	
2016	Flowers of the Prison	Jeong Dae-sik	
2017	Black	Oh Man-ho	
2019	Haechi	Yoon Hyuk	
2019	Catch the Ghost		
2022	My Liberation Notes	Mr. Baek	
2023	Payback: Money and Power	Park Jung-soo	

== Theater ==
Year	English Title	Korean title	Role
2002	Liar (play) (ko)	라이어 1탄	John Smith
2002	Liar (play) (ko)	라이어 3탄	Park Kwang-tae

== Musical ==
Year	English Title	Korean title	Role
2000	The Last Empress	명성 황후	Russia Consul General Waeber
2001	The Sorrows of Young Werthers	젊은 베르테르의 슬픔	카인즈
2003	Subway Line No. 1	지하철 1호선	Cheol Soo/Washboard/Senior Citizen/Student
2004	Faust	파우스트	Faust
2004	Singin' in the Rain	사랑은 비를 타고	Jung Dong-hyun
2004	Jekyll & Hyde	지킬 앤 하이드	Utterson
2005	Assassins	어쌔신	Leon Czolgosz
2005	The Sword of Fire	불의 검	Asa
2005	Magic Carpet Ride	매직 카펫 라이드	The Devil
2022–2023	Hero	영웅	Hirobumi Ito
