= The Gangster, the Cop, the Devil =

2019 South Korean film by Lee Won-tae

- Theatrical release poster
- Hangul: 악인전
- Hanja: 惡人傳
- RR: Aginjeon
- MR: Aginjŏn
- Directed by: Lee Won-tae
- Written by: Lee Won-tae
- Produced by: Won-seok Jang; Seo Kang-Ho
- Starring: Ma Dong-seok; Kim Mu-yeol; Kim Sung-kyu
- Cinematography: Park Se-seung
- Edited by: Heo Sun-mi; Han Young-kyu
- Music by: Jo Yeong-wook
- Production company: B.A. Entertainment
- Distributed by: Kiwi Media Group
- Release date: May 15, 2019 (South Korea)
- Running time: 109 minutes
- Country: South Korea
- Language: Korean
- Box office: $25.8 million

The Gangster, the Cop, the Devil (Korean: 악인전; lit. 'The story of evil people') (Note: The movie has different Hanja variations attested from Chinese releases. It is also known as 惡人戰 (Akinjeon, "Battle between evil people").) is a 2019 South Korean action crime film directed by Lee Won-tae that is based on a true story. The film stars Ma Dong-seok, Kim Mu-yeol and Kim Sung-kyu. In the film, a gangster and a cop join forces to capture a serial killer for their respective purposes, but they face challenges from their respective enemies.

The Gangster, the Cop, the Devil was released theatrically in South Korea on 15 May 2019, and was also screened in the "Midnight Screenings" section at the 2019 Cannes Film Festival as well as at the 2019 Fantasia International Film Festival.

== Plot ==
After a man's car is hit by a stranger, the stranger kills him as he takes pictures of the damage to submit to his car insurance. Jung Tae-suk is a cop who goes through the crime scene and suspects it to be the work of a serial killer, but his commanding officer does not believe him. Jang Dong-soo is a crime boss who, while on his way home after a meeting, is hit by the same killer, who tries to kill him as well. A brutal fight ensues, leaving both of them injured. Finally, the killer escapes after hitting Dong-soo with his car. Dong-soo is admitted to the hospital, and his henchmen assume that the attack was committed by a rival gang, whom they counter-attack.

However, Dong-soo believes the killer was not a rival gang member as his moves seemed to be random and purposeless. Tae-suk visits Dong-soo at the hospital and asks him to cooperate so that the police can catch the killer for him, but Dong-soo refuses. Instead, Dong-soo orders his men to find the killer. Using a sketch and Dong-soo's memory of the killer's license plate, they manage to find his car and a knife. Dong-soo eventually informs Tae-suk of the findings, and they decide to team up to catch the mysterious killer. Dong-soo agrees to provide manpower and cover expenses — but on the condition that the killer belongs to the one who finds him first. Dong-soo wants to kill him for revenge while Tae-suk wants to arrest him in order to solve five connected murder cases and eventually get promoted.

Meanwhile, Dong-soo orders his right-hand man, Kwon Oh-sung, to kill his rival Heo Sang-do with the killer's knife that already has traces of blood from the killer's previous victims. An enraged Tae-suk gets into a fight with Dong-soo upon learning what he has done as the killing is confirmed to be the work of a serial killer, causing the case to be transferred to the major case squad. Dong-soo attends Sang-do's funeral; the killer also turns up and informs Sang-do's second-in-command that Sang-do was killed with the killer's knife, but by someone else. When Tae-suk and Dong-soo check the killer's car for any evidence, they are attacked by Sang-do's henchmen. A fight ensues, resulting in the death of Sang-do's right-hand man while in a fight with Tae-suk.

Dong-soo gets him buried and clears the scene. Tae-suk gets assigned to investigate a kidnapping case and, while solving it, spots the killer. A chase ensues, but the killer is able to escape. Through forensic test, Tae-suk discovers the killer to be a missing person. He informs Dong-soo about this and lets him hear a voice clip to confirm the missing person is the killer. Later, Dong-soo helps a high school girl by giving her his umbrella but soon learns that the girl has been murdered and his umbrella was found at the crime scene. Dong-soo and Tae-suk and their men start looking for the killer in the area where the girl was murdered and eventually find him in a car. In the ensuing chase, the killer manages to kill Oh-sung but is finally captured and incapacitated by Dong-soo. Dong-soo takes the killer away to torture and kill him, but Tae-suk tracks them down and crashes his car into the hideout just as Dong-soo is about to kill the killer. Tae-suk hits Dong-soo with his car and arrests the killer.

The police have no conclusive evidence against the killer, Kang Kyung-ho. As a last resort, Tae-suk asks Dong-soo, the sole survivor of the attacks, to testify. Simultaneously, Tae-suk threatens to release a tape of Dong-soo's confession of having Sang-do killed. During Kyung-ho's trial, Dong-soo arrives to testify and provides decisive testimony. Dong-soo successfully predicts the existence of a stab wound on Kyung-ho's body, previously inflicted by Dong-soo during their first encounter. Dong-soo also provides misleading evidence framing Kyung-ho for Sang-do's murder. The court sentences Kyung-ho to death; however, Dong-soo is also arrested due to his illegal activities.

Tae-suk is finally promoted while Dong-soo is sent to the prison where Kyung-ho is kept: the condition which Dong-soo had requested Tae-suk to fulfill in exchange for the testimony followed by his arrest. Spotting Kyung-ho, Dong-soo gleefully enters prison. While Kyung-ho is showering, he is confronted by Dong-soo with a rope in his hand and a smile on his face.

== Cast ==
- Ma Dong-seok as Jang Dong-soo
- Kim Mu-yeol as Jung Tae-suk
- Kim Sung-kyu as Kang Kyung-ho (K)
- Choi Min-chul as Kwon Oh-sung
- Heo Dong-won as Choi Moon-sik
- Yoo Jae-myung as Heo Sang-do (special appearance)
- Yoo Seung-mok as Ahn Ho-bong
- Oh Hee-joon as Kim Dong-chul
- Cha Soon-bae as Supreme Court Justice
- Park Bo-kyung as Victim's wife
- Lee Eun-saem as High school student

== Production ==
=== Filming ===
Principal photography began on July 31, 2018, and wrapped on November 18, 2018.

== Release ==
The Gangster, the Cop, The Devil was released in South Korea on May 15, 2019. The film was also shown out of competition in the Midnight Screenings section at the 2019 Cannes Film Festival.

== Reception ==
=== Critical response ===
The film received positive critical reviews. On review aggregator website Rotten Tomatoes, the film holds a score of 97% based on 34 reviews, with an average rating of 7/10. The critics consensus states, "An odd couple cop thriller with a twist, The Gangster, The Cop, The Devil tells its entertaining story with a blend of humour and hard-hitting action." On review aggregator website Metacritic, the film has a weighted average score of 65 out of 100 based on seven critics, indicating "generally favourable reviews".

Leslie Felperin of The Guardian stated "Although its final act shreds credulity, and the structure is a bit wonky, this pulpy crime thriller from Korea is still a real kick in the head. Like so many of the genre that hail from Seoul and its suburbs, this one punches well above its weight with an inventive reworking of well-worn plot tropes and slick production values." Jessica Kiang of Variety commented "Korea has dominated the midnight-movie/genre slots at international festivals so thoroughly of late that it's hard not to view Lee Won-tae's "The Gangster, the Cop, the Devil" in terms of its shortcomings in comparison to the likes of Train to Busan, The Age of Shadows, The Wailing and so on. But what this fun, slick but slightly forgettable hardboiled actioner lacks in terms of the energy, originality and inventiveness of a true Korean genre classic, it almost makes up for as a showcase for the burly charisma of star Don Lee, aka Ma Dong-Seok." Cary Darling of the Houston Chronicle added "Director/writer Lee Won-tae, for whom this is only his second feature, keeps the pace moving swiftly with this cats-and-mouse game, showing off an energetic sensibility that heralds a new voice on the South Korean film scene. It's no wonder that "The Gangster, The Cop, The Devil", which was invited for a midnight-screening slot at the recently concluded Cannes Film Festival, has been picked up by Hollywood for an English-language remake with Sylvester Stallone producing."

David Ehrlich of IndieWire noted "In broad strokes, this premise has already been explored to death, but "The Gangster, the Cop, the Devil" breathes new life into it by elevating at least two of its three major characters far above their archetypes." Michael Leader of Little White Lies wrote "While not wildly original – Asian crime cinema has mined these uncommon team-ups and ethical ambiguities for decades – The Gangster, the Cop, the Devil pulls off its familiar twists and turns with style and verve. An expansive, electric-neon aerial shot at the start of the film places us firmly in Michael Mann territory, and the machismo of the film's protagonists spills over into director Lee Won-tae's amped-up aesthetic, from flashy scene transitions and montages to generous helpings of slow-mo, crunchy fight choreography and a driving rock soundtrack throughout. The film is slick, stylish and consistently entertaining, but it would be nothing without its headline lead performances." Richard Whittaker of Austin Chronicle wrote "Yes, it's car crashes and fight sequences and dry jokes, but it's a mix that will make you wow, wince and guffaw in just the right amounts, all carried off with a gritty style. It may lull a little in the final act, but that's just setting up one of the decade's low-key finest payoffs." Ben Travis of Empire wrote "There's not much going on beneath the energetic surface, but for the most part The Gangster, The Cop, The Devil is a fast-paced, entertaining thriller buoyed by two engaging leads". Trevor Johnson of Time Out gave the film three stars out of five, commenting "This muscular South Korean crime thriller is neon-lit catnip for fans of the genre... A solid, if not quite exceptional, time-passer". Jason Gorber of /Film gave the film 6.5 point of 10, stating "As it stands, this is a movie with a great idea and pretty decent execution, one where the fists fly, the cars crash, and you actually care about the characters involved. With a bit of tweaking, especially with regard to the Devil character to make him (or her!) more chilling and compelling, there's the opportunity to up the ante even further and craft a magnificent film. For now, we've got a great bit of genre fun, a movie that at once evokes the rich history of this kind of film with its iconic character types, yet does so with enough originality and confidence to make The Gangster, The Cop, The Devil a powerful tale of its own".

== Remake ==
On 5 May 2019, it was announced that Sylvester Stallone and his Balboa Productions partner Braden Aftergood will produce the US remake of The Gangster, the Cop, the Devil, with Ma Dong-seok reprising his role and producing the film under BA Entertainment.

On 10 March 2026, it was announced that James Wan would direct the remake from a script by Shay Hatten and Brian Helgeland. Wan and Michael Clear will serve as producers through Blumhouse-Atomic Monster for Paramount Pictures. On 20 October 2026, it was reported that Keanu Reeves was in talks to star in the remake alongside Ma, with Eric Pearson having written the most recent draft of the screenplay.
