= Even If This Love Disappears From the World Tonight (2025 film) =

2025 film by Kim Hye-young

- Theatrical release poster
- Hangul: 오늘 밤, 세계에서 이 사랑이 사라진다 해도
- RR: Oneul bam, segyeeseo i sarangi sarajinda haedo
- MR: Onŭl pam, segyeesŏ i sarangi sarajinda haedo
- Directed by: Kim Hye-young
- Screenplay by: Lee Yu-jin; Jo Ba-reun
- Based on: Even If This Love Disappears From the World Tonight by Misaki Ichijo
- Produced by: Song Hyo-jeong
- Starring: Choo Young-woo; Shin Si-ah
- Cinematography: Lee Seok-min
- Edited by: Lee Kang-hee
- Music by: Hong Dae-sung
- Production companies: Blue Fire Studio; Red Ice Entertainment; O'FAN House (Note: A South Korean book publishing company, which is a joint venture of Kadokawa Corporation of Japan and By4M Studio of South Korea.); Kadokawa
- Distributed by: By4M Studio
- Release dates: 24 December 2025 (South Korea); 4 February 2026 (Netflix)
- Running time: 108 minutes
- Country: South Korea
- Language: Korean
- Box office: US$5.7 million

Even If This Love Disappears From the World Tonight (Korean: 오늘 밤, 세계에서 이 사랑이 사라진다 해도) is a 2025 South Korean romantic drama film directed by Kim Hye-young, based on the Japanese novel of the same name. Produced under Blue Fire Studio, it stars Choo Young-woo and Shin Si-ah. The film was theatrically released on 24 December 2025, and later acquired by Netflix and is available for streaming on 4 February 2026.

== Plot ==
High school student Han Seo-yoon records a quiet moment of cooking lunch with her mother in a computer memo. The next morning, she wakes to dozens of notes reminding her that she has anterograde amnesia, caused by a traffic accident earlier that year. Every day, her memory resets to the day of the accident, forcing her to rely on written records to understand her life. Only her parents, teachers, and her best friend Choi Ji-min know the truth. On her way to school, Seo-yoon meets Kim Jae-won when he catches her from falling on a bus, beginning a connection neither of them yet understands.

Jae-won soon becomes entangled in Seo-yoon's life for the wrong reasons. To stop severe bullying against his classmate, he is coerced into falsely confessing his feelings to Seo-yoon. Unexpectedly, she accepts without hesitation and immediately records him as her boyfriend, forcing Jae-won to confront the consequences of his lie. As they spend time together commuting home, sharing conversations, and going on casual dates, Seo-yoon carefully documents every detail about him, while Jae-won grows increasingly drawn to her sincerity and vulnerability. What began as a deception slowly becomes genuine.

As their relationship deepens, Seo-yoon's amnesia reveals its harshest cost. One night, she falls asleep on the bus, something she desperately avoids, and wakes unable to recognize Jae-won, panicking and running away from him in the rain. Though she eventually relearns the truth through her notes and apologizes, the incident exposes how fragile their bond truly is. Jae-won commits himself to understanding her condition and protecting her memories.

Unbeknownst to Seo-yoon, Jae-won is hiding his own truth. He has a worsening heart condition. When his health suddenly deteriorates, he dies, leaving behind devastated friends and a grieving father. To spare Seo-yoon the trauma of repeatedly reliving the loss, Ji-min fulfills Jae-won's final request by hiding all records of him from Seo-yoon's life, including her diary, her phone, and their shared memories. As a result, Seo-yoon forgets Jae-won entirely, though she continues drawing a mysterious boy she cannot identify.

Over time, Seo-yoon's condition begins to improve. When Ji-min discovers that Seo-yoon has unconsciously filled her room with sketches of Jae-won, Ji-min finally confesses the truth and returns everything she had hidden. Seo-yoon restores her diary and rereads her life with Jae-won, fully confronting her grief at last. She revisits the places they once shared, the lunch spot and the beach at sunset, where she imagines Jae-won gently tying her shoelaces one final time.

== Cast ==
- Choo Young-woo as Kim Jae-won
- Shin Si-ah as Han Seo-yoon
- Cho Yu-jung as Choi Ji-min
- Jin Ho-eun as Jeong Tae-hoon
- Jo Han-chul as Kim Seong-hyeon

== Production ==
=== Development ===
The film was officially announced with Kim Hye-young serving as director, while Blue Fire Studio managed the production. The soundtrack was composed by Ha Dong-kyun, Joy, Lee Chang-sub, Gain, Jo Kwon, Tei and Plave. The press conference was held on 22 December 2025 at the CGV Yongsan I-Park Mall.

=== Casting ===
In April 2025, it was reported that Choo Young-woo and Shin Si-ah were reportedly cast and positively reviewing it. In July 2025, it was reported that Cho Yu-jung and Jin Ho-eun would appear in the film.

=== Filming ===
The script reading session was held on 2 July 2025. Principal photography of the film commenced in July 2025, and filming ended in October of the same year. The filming took place in Yeosu.

== Soundtrack ==
Part 1

Released on 9 November 2025
No.	Title	Artist	Length
1.	"Exhausted"	Ha Dong-kyun	4:14
2.	"Exhausted (Instrumental)"	Ha Dong-kyun	4:14

Part 2

Released on 27 November 2025
No.	Title	Artist	Length
1.	"Love Condition"	Joy	4:32
2.	"Love Condition (Instrumental)"	Joy	4:32

Part 3

Released on 11 December 2025
No.	Title	Artist	Length
1.	"365 Days"	Lee Chang-sub	4:13
2.	"365 Days (Instrumental)"	Lee Chang-sub	4:13

Part 4

Released on 17 December 2025
No.	Title	Artist	Length
1.	"I Happen to Love You"	Gain, Jo Kwon	3:33
2.	"I Happen to Love You [Instrumental]"	Gain, Jo Kwon	3:33

Part 5

Released on 29 December 2025
No.	Title	Artist	Length
1.	"Borrow your night"	Plave	3:00
2.	"Borrow your night (Instrumental)"	Plave	3:00

Part 6

Released on 8 January 2026
No.	Title	Artist	Length
1.	"Romance, That Night"	Jukjae	3:23
2.	"Romance, That Night (Instrumental)"	Jukjae	3:23

Part 7

Released on 21 January 2026
No.	Title	Artist	Length
1.	"Even If This Love Disappears Tonight"	Jeon Sang Keun	3:40
2.	"Even If This Love Disappears Tonight (Instrumental)"	Jeon Sang Keun	3:40

Part 8

Released on 28 January 2026
No.	Title	Artist	Length
1.	"Moon"	Yang Da-il	TBA
2.	"Moon (Instrumental)"	Yang Da-il	TBA

Part 9

Released on 2026
No.	Title	Artist	Length
1.	"Last Love"	Tei	TBA
2.	"Last Love (Instrumental)"	Tei	TBA

== Release ==
The film was released theatrically on 24 December 2025. The film's digital streaming rights were acquired by Netflix and was released on 4 February 2026.

== Accolades ==
Award	Date of ceremony	Category	Recipient(s)	Result	Ref.
Baeksang Arts Awards	May 8, 2026	Best New Actress	Shin Si-ah	Nominated	
Buil Film Awards	October 7, 2026	Best New Actress	Shin Si-ah	Pending	

== See also ==
- 50 First Dates, a 2004 American film with a similar premise
