= The Devil's Deal =

2021 South Korean film

- Theatrical release poster
- Hangul: 대외비
- Hanja: 對外秘
- RR: Daeoebi
- MR: Taeoebi
- Directed by: Lee Won-tae
- Written by: Lee Soo-jin
- Starring: Cho Jin-woong; Lee Sung-min; Kim Mu-yeol
- Cinematography: Kim Seong-an
- Edited by: Heo Seon-mi; Jo Han-ul
- Music by: Jo Yeong-wook
- Production companies: Twinfilm Inc. B.A Entertainment
- Distributed by: Megabox Plus M
- Release dates: August 7, 2021 (Fantasia Fest); March 1, 2023 (South Korea)
- Running time: 116 minutes
- Country: South Korea
- Language: Korean
- Box office: US$5.7 million

The Devil's Deal (Korean: 대외비; RR: Daeoebi) is a 2021 South Korean crime thriller film directed by Lee Won-tae, starring Cho Jin-woong, Lee Sung-min and Kim Mu-yeol. The film is about betrayal and conspiracy between three men who start a dangerous deal for money, power, fame, and their own desires. It was released theatrically in South Korea on March 1, 2023.

== Plot ==
In 1992, Busan, Hae-woong, a perennial candidate for the National Assembly, dreams of ending his struggling political career. This time, he is determined to win the election and secure a parliamentary seat. However, he is betrayed by Soon-tae, a power broker who dominates the political scene, and loses his party's nomination for his district.

Determined to overturn the election game orchestrated by Soon-tae, Hae-woong obtains a classified document containing redevelopment plans for the Busan area. With the help of action-driven gangster Pil-do, he secures the funds needed for his campaign and enters the election as an independent candidate, gaining momentum. But Soon-tae learns of the secret document in Hae-woong's possession and begins to tighten the noose around him, leading to an escalating battle of wits and power.

== Cast ==
- Cho Jin-woong as Jeon Hae-woong
- Lee Sung-min as Kwon Soon-tae
- Kim Mu-yeol as Kim Pil-do
- Son Yeo-eun as Sang-mi
- Kim Min-jae as Jang-ho
- Won Hyeon-jun as Jeong Han-mo
- Park Se-jin as Dan-ah
- Kim Yoon-seong as manager of Park
- Lee Sang-won as Chief Ahn
- Yoo Seung-mok as Ahn Gyu-hwan
- Choi Min-cheol as manager

== Production ==
Principal photography began on April 30, 2020.

== Release ==
The film made its world premiere at the 25th Fantasia International Film Festival on August 7, 2021. The film also invited to the 41st Hawaii International Film Festival in November 2021 and the 20th Florence Korean Film Festival in April 2022.
