= Lee Won-tae =

South Korean film director, screenwriter and producer

- Born: South Korea
- Occupations: Film director, screenwriter, film and TV producer

Korean name
- Hangul: 이원태
- RR: I Wontae
- MR: I Wŏnt'ae

Lee Won-tae (Korean: 이원태) is a South Korean film director, screenwriter and producer. Formerly working as a producer on programs for MBC TV, Lee debuted with the period prison drama Man of Will in 2017. Prior to that, he also served as producer on the 2011 horror romcom Spellbound and penned the original story for the 2015 period film The Magician. His second feature, The Gangster, The Cop, The Devil, was invited to the Cannes Film Festival in 2019. An upcoming American remake of the film was announced in May 2019, with Sylvester Stallone and Braden Aftergood producing and Ma Dong-seok reprising his role in the remake.

== Filmography ==
Year	Title	Credited as
Film
2011	Spellbound	Producer
2012	Papa	Producer
2012	Gabi	Script department
2015	The Magician	Original story
2017	Man of Will	Director, screenwriter, original story
2019	The Gangster, the Cop, the Devil	Director, screenwriter
2023	The Devil's Deal	Director
Television series
2023	Payback	Director
