= Resident Playbook =

2025 South Korean television series

- Promotional poster
- Also known as: Wise Resident Life
- Hangul: 언젠가는 슬기로울 전공의생활
- Lit.: A Life of a Resident That Will Be Wise Someday
- RR: Eonjenganeun seulgiroul jeongongui saenghwal
- MR: Ŏnjen'ganŭn sŭlgiroul chŏn'gongŭi saenghwal
- Genre: Medical drama
- Created by: Shin Won-ho; Lee Woo-jung
- Written by: Kim Song-hee
- Directed by: Lee Min-soo
- Starring: Go Youn-jung; Shin Si-ah; Kang You-seok; Han Ye-ji; Jung Joon-won
- Country of origin: South Korea
- Original language: Korean
- No. of episodes: 12

Production
- Running time: 70-90 minutes
- Production company: Eggiscoming

Original release
- Network: tvN
- Release: April 12 – May 18, 2025

Related
- Hospital Playlist (2020–2021)

Resident Playbook (Korean: 언젠가는 슬기로울 전공의생활) is a 2025 South Korean television series created by Shin Won-ho and Lee Woo-jung, written by Kim Song-hee, directed by Lee Min-soo, and starring Go Youn-jung, Shin Si-ah, Kang You-seok, Han Ye-ji, and Jung Joon-won. This TV series is a spin-off of the 2020–2021 series Hospital Playlist, and depicts the life and friendship of university hospital professors and doctors. It aired on tvN from April 12, 2025, to May 18, 2025, every Saturday and Sunday at 21:10 (KST). It is available for streaming on Netflix in selected regions.

== Synopsis ==
Set at the Jongno branch of Yulje Medical Center, the series follows the hospital lives and turbulent friendships of young obstetrics and gynaecology residents who proudly enter the unpopular department in an era of low birth rates.

== Cast and characters ==
=== Main ===
- Go Youn-jung as Oh Yi-young

A first-year obstetrics and gynaecology resident.

- Shin Si-ah as Pyo Nam-kyung

A first-year obstetrics and gynaecology resident.

- Kang You-seok as Um Jae-il

A first-year obstetrics and gynaecology resident and former K-pop idol.

- Han Ye-ji as Kim Sa-bi

A first-year obstetrics and gynaecology resident.

- Jung Joon-won as Ku Do-won

A fourth-year and chief resident of obstetrics and gynaecology.

=== Supporting ===
==== People in the Jongno branch of Yulje Hospital ====
- Lee Bong-ryun as Seo Jeong-min

A professor of obstetrics and gynaecology.

- Lee Chang-hoon as Ryu Jae-hwi

A professor of obstetrics and gynaecology.

- Son Ji-yoon as Kong Gi-seon

A professor of obstetrics and gynaecology.

- Lee Hyun-kyun as Jo Jun-mo

A professor of obstetrics and gynaecology.

- Seo Yi-seo as Park Joon-seok

Fourth-year resident in emergency medicine.

- Lee Do-hye as Ki Eun-mi

Third-year resident in obstetrics and gynaecology. A former resident at the Main Branch of Yulje Medical Centre.

- Hong Na-hyun as Cha Da-hye

Second-year resident in obstetrics and gynaecology.

- Kim Hye-in as Myung Eun-won

Second-year fellow in obstetrics and gynaecology. A former resident at the Main Branch of Yulje Medical Centre.

- Yoo Hyun-jong as Park Moo-kang

Second-year resident in pediatrics.

- Kim Yi-joon as Ham Dong-ho

Third-year resident in anesthesiology.

- Cha Kang-yoon as Tak Gi-on

An intern in obstetrics and gynaecology.

- Kwon Young-eun as Choi Yoon-jung

A nurse in the operating room.

- Park Ha-eun as Hong Min-joo

A nurse in the pediatrics department.

- Choi Yoon-ji as Lee Chae-ryeong

A nurse in the obstetrics and gynaecology department.

==== Family ====
- Jung Woon-sun as Oh Joo-young

Yi-young’s older sister and Seung-won’s wife.

- Jeong Soon-won as Koo Seung-won

Do-won’s older brother and Joo-young’s husband.

=== Special appearances ===
- Ra Mi-ran as a doctor, massage therapist, and bank teller (Ep. 1).
- Ahn Eun-jin as Chu Min-ha (Eps. 2 and 12)

A fellow doctor in obstetrics and gynaecology at the Songdo branch of Yulje Medical Centre. She got promoted to professor and transferred to the Jongno branch.

- Ha Yoon-kyung as Heo Sun-bin (Ep. 3)

A fellow doctor in neurosurgery at the main branch of Yulje Medical Centre.

- Moon Tae-yoo as Yong Seok-min (Ep. 3)

A professor in neurosurgery at the Jongno branch of Yulje Medical Centre.

- Jung Kyung-ho as Kim Jun-wan (Ep. 4)

A professor of cardiothoracic surgery from the main branch of Yulje Medical Centre, who became chief of the department.

- Jung Moon-sung as Do Jae-hak (Ep. 4 (voice only); Ep. 11)

A fellow doctor in cardiothoracic surgery at the main branch of Yulje Medical Centre.

- Yoo Yeon-seok as Ahn Jeong-won/Andrea (Ep. 5)

A professor of pediatric surgery at the main branch and the son of the founder of the hospital.

- Bae Hyun-sung as Jang Hong-do (Ep. 6)

A resident doctor at the Jongno branch of Yulje Medical Centre.

- Kim Jun-han as Ahn Chi-hong (Ep. 7)

A professor in neurosurgery at the Jongno branch of Yulje Medical Centre.

- Kwak Sun-young as Lee Ik-sun (Ep. 7)

A soldier and Lee Ik-jun’s younger sister.

- Sung Yoo-bin as Hong Gi-dong (Ep. 7)

Pyo Nam-kyung’s ex-boyfriend.

- Shin Hyun-been as Jang Gyeo-ul (Ep. 8)

A fellow doctor in general surgery at the main branch of Yulje Medical Centre.

- Na Yeong-seok as Jang Young-seok (Ep. 9)

A producer, father of Mo-ne and Ma-ne.

- Shin Won-ho as one of Jang Young-seok’s crew. (Ep. 9)
- Soobin as D.I. (Ep. 9)

Jae-il’s former co-member of “Hi-Boyz”.

- Yeonjun as Top Key (Ep. 9)

Jae-il’s former co-member of “Hi-Boyz”.

- Jo Jung-suk as Lee Ik-jun (Ep. 10)

A professor of general surgery at the Main branch of Yulje Medical Centre

- Jeon Mi-do as Chae Song-hwa (Ep. 10)

A professor of neurosurgery at the main branch of Yulje Medical Centre.

- Kim Dae-myung as Yang Seok-hyeong (Ep. 12)

A professor in obstetrics and gynaecology at the main branch of Yulje Medical Centre.

- Kang Shin-il as Im Dong-ju (Ep. 12)

A senior professor in obstetrics and gynaecology at the Jongno branch of Yulje Medical Centre.

== Production ==
=== Development ===
In 2023, director Shin Won-ho had reportedly started working on a new project, a spin-off to Hospital Playlist (2020–2021) and contacted several actors and held auditions in secret. Later, Shin's new work was denied to be neither prequel nor spin-off of Hospital Playlist as contrast from a media report.

The series was another collaboration of Shin and writer Lee Woo-jung, who produced the Reply series and Hospital Playlist series, directed by Lee Min-soo, as well as written by Kim Song-hee, an assistant writer of Reply 1988 and Hospital Playlist. Eggiscoming managed the production.

=== Casting ===
On July 5, 2023, Go Youn-jung was reportedly cast as the female lead of Resident Playbook. She was confirmed to appear for the series two months later.

On September 20, 2023, Shin Si-ah was cast as the other female lead and confirmed it a day later. On September 22, Kang You-seok was reportedly cast as the male lead of the series and confirmed it three days later. Jung Joon-won was also cast as another male lead and confirmed his appearance three days later.

Go, Shin, Kang, Jung, along with Han Ye-ji completed the main cast line-up of the series.

=== Filming ===
In May 2023, it was reported that principal photography would begin in the second half of 2023. After two months, the filming was scheduled to start in October of that year.

=== Postponement ===
In February 2024, many doctors, residents, and interns had resigned and suspended their studies to protest a South Korean government proposal to increase medical school enrollment by 2,000 every year from 2025, setting the quota to 5,058. Due to this medical strike, the series suffered from it. tvN announced that depending on the situation the broadcast date could be delayed. In March 2024, it was reported that the series was postponed to the second half of 2024, with exact date yet to be determined. In September 2024, as the series has been delayed several times it was decided to be cancelled this year until further notice.

== Original soundtrack ==
Resident Playbook

Soundtrack album by various artists
- Released: May 18, 2025
- Languages: Korean; English
- Labels: Studio MaumC; Egg Is Coming; Stone Music Entertainment
- Producer: Ma Joo-hee

The Resident Playbook original soundtrack produced by Ma Joo-hee was released on May 19, 2025, by Studio MaumC, Egg Is Coming and Stone Music Entertainment.

Part 1

Released on April 12, 2025
No.	Title	Lyrics	Music	Artist	Length
1.	"Start!"	The O	The O	Lee Know, Seungmin, I.N (Stray Kids)	3:47
2.	"Start!" (Inst.)		The O		3:47
Total length:					7:34

Part 2

Released on April 13, 2025
No.	Title	Lyrics	Music	Artist	Length
1.	"Sunny Day"	Zozo (Eldorado); Gaeul Son (Eldorado)	Won Jang (Eldorado); Scarlett Nguyen; Kiwang Park	An Yu-jin (Ive)	3:16
2.	"Sunny Day" (Inst.)		Won Jang (Eldorado); Scarlett Nguyen; Kiwang Park		3:16
Total length:					6:32

Part 3

Released on April 19, 2025
No.	Title	Lyrics	Music	Artist	Length
1.	"On Such a Day" (그런 날)	Hen; Seoown	Hen; Seoown	Winter (Aespa)	3:39
2.	"On Such a Day" (그런 날; Inst.)		Hen; Seoown		3:39
Total length:					7:18

Part 4

Released on April 20, 2025
No.	Title	Lyrics	Music	Artist	Length
1.	"Amateur" (아마추어)	Hong Jin-young	Hong Jin-young	Mido and Falasol (Note: Original song by Lee Seung-chul, released in 2012.)	4:04
2.	"Amateur" (아마추어; Inst.)		Hong Jin-young		4:04
Total length:					8:08

Part 5

Released on April 26, 2025
No.	Title	Lyrics	Music	Artist	Length
1.	"Breath" (숨)	Baek A	Baek A	Minnie ((G)I-dle)	3:52
2.	"Breath" (숨; Inst.)		Baek A		3:52
Total length:					7:44

Part 6

Released on April 27, 2025
No.	Title	Lyrics	Music	Artist	Length
1.	"Forever" (영원해)	The Orchard	The Orchard	D.O. (Exo)	4:04
2.	"Forever" (영원해; Inst.)		The Orchard		4:04
Total length:					8:08

Part 7

Released on May 3, 2025
No.	Title	Lyrics	Music	Artist	Length
1.	"It's You" (너인데)	MaO	Dailog; Hen	DK (Seventeen)	3:48
2.	"It's You" (너인데; Inst.)		Dailog; Hen		3:48
Total length:					7:36

Part 8

Released on May 4, 2025
No.	Title	Lyrics	Music	Artist	Length
1.	"Someday It's Time to Shine" (언젠가 눈부시게 빛날 테니 (언눈빛))	Lee Jin-hyung; MaO	Lee Jun-hyung	Mido and Falasol	4:49
2.	"Someday It's Time to Shine" (언젠가 눈부시게 빛날 테니 (언눈빛); Inst.)		Lee Jun-hyung		4:49
Total length:					9:38

Part 9

Released on May 11, 2025
No.	Title	Lyrics	Music	Artist	Length
1.	"When the Day Comes" (그날이 오면)	Galactika *	Galactika *; Ji-hye (Galactika *)	Tomorrow X Together	3:41
2.	"When the Day Comes" (그날이 오면; Inst.)		Galactika *; Ji-hye (Galactika *)		3:41
Total length:					7:22

Part 10

Released on May 17, 2025
No.	Title	Lyrics	Music	Artist	Length
1.	"A Race" (달리기)	Park Changhark	Yoon Sang	Go Youn-jung, Shin Si-ah, Kang You-seok, Han Ye-ji (Note: Original song by Yoon Sang, released in 1996.)	3:36
2.	"A Race" (달리기; Inst.)		Yoon Sang		3:36
Total length:					7:12

=== Singles ===
List of singles, showing year released and selected chart positions
Title	Year	Peak chart positions	Notes
Title	Year	KOR	Notes
"Start!"	2025	— (Note: "Start!" did not chart on the Circle Digital Chart but peaked at number 58 on the Download Chart.)	Part 1
"Sunny Day"	2025	— (Note: "Sunny Day" did not chart on the Circle Digital Chart but peaked at number 24 on the Download Chart.)	Part 2
"On Such a Day" (그런 날)	2025	— (Note: "On Such a Day" did not chart on the Circle Digital Chart but peaked at number 23 on the Download Chart.)	Part 3
"Amateur" (아마추어)	2025	108	Part 4
"Breath" (숨)	2025	— (Note: "Breath" did not chart on the Circle Digital Chart but peaked at number 45 on the Download Chart.)	Part 5
"Forever" (영원해)	2025	41	Part 6
"It's You" (너인데)	2025	— (Note: "It's You" did not chart on the Circle Digital Chart but peaked at number 32 on the Download Chart.)	Part 7
"Someday It's Time to Shine" (언젠가 눈부시게 빛날 테니 (언눈빛))	2025	173	Part 8
"When the Day Comes" (그날이 오면)	2025	39	Part 9
"A Race" (달리기)	2025	96	Part 10
"—" denotes releases that did not chart or were not released in that region.

== Release ==
As of July 2023, Resident Playbook was scheduled to air in March 2024. In January 2024, tvN announced Resident Playbook as part of its 2024 drama line-up. The next month, tvN confirmed the series' broadcast for the first half that year. It was originally scheduled to air in May after Queen of Tears, but was postponed indefinitely due to the ongoing medical strike in South Korea. It was also supposed to stream on Netflix.

The series ultimately premiered on tvN on April 12, 2025, every Saturday and Sunday at 21:10 (KST).

== Viewership ==
Resident Playbook : South Korea viewers per episode (millions)

Season	Episode number												Average
Season	1	2	3	4	5	6	7	8	9	10	11	12	Average
1	1.094	1.065	1.261	1.396	1.277	1.540	1.423	1.682	1.674	2.089	1.812	2.152	1.538

Source: Audience measurement performed nationwide by Nielsen Korea.

Average TV viewership ratings
Ep.	Original broadcast date	Average audience share (Nielsen Korea)	
Ep.	Original broadcast date	Nationwide	Seoul
1	April 12, 2025	3.680% (1st)	4.365% (1st)
2	April 13, 2025	3.986% (1st)	4.477% (1st)
3	April 19, 2025	4.475% (1st)	5.065% (1st)
4	April 20, 2025	5.135% (1st)	5.761% (1st)
5	April 26, 2025	4.821% (1st)	6.069% (1st)
6	April 27, 2025	5.531% (1st)	5.876% (1st)
7	May 3, 2025	5.310% (1st)	5.979% (1st)
8	May 4, 2025	5.972% (1st)	6.389% (1st)
9	May 10, 2025	6.214% (1st)	7.103% (1st)
10	May 11, 2025	7.491% (1st)	8.450% (1st)
11	May 17, 2025	6.627% (1st)	7.620% (1st)
12	May 18, 2025	8.142% (1st)	8.630% (1st)
Average		5.615%	6.315%
In the table above, the blue numbers represent the lowest ratings and the red numbers represent the highest ratings.; This drama airs on a cable channel/pay TV, which normally has a relatively smaller audience compared to free-to-air TV/public broadcasters (KBS, SBS, MBC, and EBS).

== Accolades ==
Award ceremony	Year	Category	Recipient(s)	Result	Ref.
Baeksang Arts Awards	2026	Best New Actor	Jung Joon-won	Nominated	
Baeksang Arts Awards	2026	Best New Actress	Shin Si-ah	Nominated	
FUNdex Awards	2025	Best Actress in TV Drama	Go Youn-jung	Won	
