= Shin Si-ah =

South Korean actress (born 1998)

Shin Shi-ah
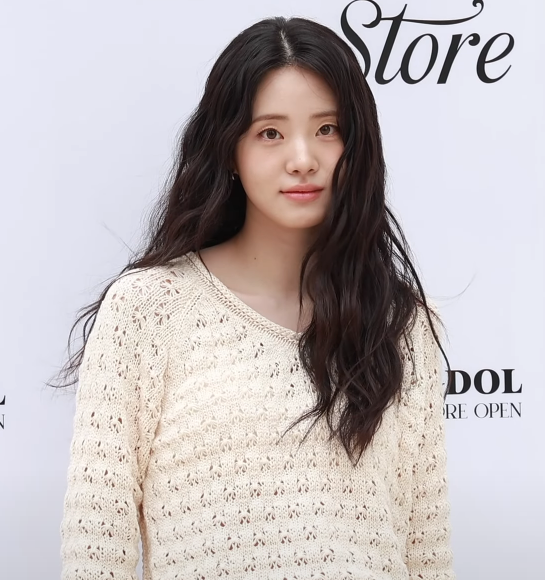
- Shin in April 2025
- Born: May 12, 1998 (age 28); South Korea
- Other name: Cynthia (Note: Common misspelling/wrong romanization on latin script based websites before the release of The Witch : Part 2. The Other One.)
- Education: Department of Theater and Film of Hanyang University
- Occupations: Model; actress
- Years active: 2022–present
- Agent: Management Soop

Korean name
- Hangul: 신시아
- RR: Sin Sia
- MR: Sin Sia

Shin Si-ah (Korean: 신시아; born May 12, 1998) is a South Korean actress. She made her debut as the lead in Park Hoon-jung's film The Witch: Part 2. The Other One. Since then, she appeared in the drama Resident Playbook as Pyo Nam-kyung, an obstetrics and gynecology resident.

== Early life and education ==
Shin was born on May 12, 1998, as an only child. In her first year of high school, she watched the musical Carmen. The experience sparked her interest in acting. To build her confidence, she spent the next two years watching four musicals a week. In her senior year, she mapped out her goals: to study theater and film, perform in plays, join a production company, and eventually produce independent films. She took her first major step toward these goals by enrolling in the Department of Theater and Film at Hanyang University.

== Career ==
From 2018 to 2019, Shin was listed as a cast member of the TV Mini Series My Darling Boyfriend. In 2019, Shin was cast in the short film Prasad. The film centers on a girl who survives a bus accident alone and is subsequently bullied on social media, leading to her transformation into a real witch. The film was screened at the 18th Mise-en-scène Short Film Festival.

In 2020, Shin was cast as the lead in The Witch: Part 2. The Other One following an audition process with odds of 1,408 to 1. The first and second rounds consisted of non-face-to-face video auditions. After advancing to the third round, she met director Park Hoon-jung for an in-person audition. She then had approximately five or six subsequent meetings with the director before ultimately being selected. The entire audition period lasted about three months. At that time, it was reported that Shin was affiliated with the agency Andmarq as a rookie actress.

On March 13, 2022, Shin signed an exclusive contract with Andmarq. On June 15, the movie The Witch: Part 2. The Other One where Shin is the lead, premiered. On July 17, Shin had her first solo pictorial shoot since her debut with W Korea.

On January 20, 2025, Andmarq confirmed Shin's casting in the movie The Old Woman with the Knife, where she plays a younger version of the main character, Hornclaw. The film was subsequently invited to the Berlinale Special section of the 75th Berlin International Film Festival. On February 14, Shin joined Chef Edward Lee, Byun Yo-han and Go Ah-sung in a variety show called Edward Lee's Country Cook.

Shin made her drama debut on tvN's Resident Playbook as Pyo Nam-kyung, a first year resident doctor, alongside Go Youn-jung, Kang you-seok, and Han Ye-ji. It premiered on April 12, 2025. On June 9, Shin signed an exclusive contract with Management Soop. She starred in the romance film Even If This Love Disappears From the World Tonight directed by Kim Hye-young, based on the novel of the same name. It was released theatrically on Christmas Eve 2025, and is also available to stream on Netflix since February 2026.

== Endorsements ==
In 2020, Shin appeared in a cosmetics brand advertisement as a ballet teacher. On June 23, 2022, Shin was selected as the main model for Plus X's modern Asian skincare brand Diponde. In 2023, Shin, was selected as model for Coca-Cola's hydration drink Toretta!.

In 2024, Mongdol, a brand that pursues natural minimalism, released a pictorial for its 2024 summer collection campaign with Shin. The pictorial was part of the "Mongdol X Sia" campaign.

== Filmography ==
=== Film ===
Year	Title	Role	Notes	Ref.
2019	Prasad	Do-hwa	Short film	
2022	The Witch: Part 2. The Other One	Girl (Ark 1 Datum point)	Feature film debut	
2025	The Old Woman with the Knife	Young Hornclaw		
2025	Even If This Love Disappears From the World Tonight	Han Seo-yoon	Netflix film	

=== Television series ===
Year	Title	Role	Ref.
2025	Resident Playbook	Pyo Nam-kyung	
TBA	Grand Galaxy Hotel †		
TBA	No Crushing Allowed †	So-ran	

=== Web series ===
Year	Title	Role	Ref.
2018	My Love Dog Boyfriend	Go-eun	
2019	When Two Male Friends Fight Over Me	Si-ah	

=== Television shows ===
Year	Title	Role	Ref.
2025	Edward Lee's Country Cook	Cast member	

=== Music video appearances ===
Year	Title	Artist	Ref.
2026	"Blue Coral Reef"	Lee Su-hyun	

== Discography ==
=== Soundtrack appearances ===
List of soundtrack appearances, showing year released and selected chart positions
Title	Year	Peak chart positions	Notes
Title	Year	KOR	Notes
"A Race" (달리기) (with Go Youn-jung, Kang You-seok, Han Ye-ji)	2025	96	Resident Playbook OST

== Accolades ==
=== Awards and nominations ===
Name of the award ceremony, year presented, category, nominee of the award, and the result of the nomination
Award ceremony	Year	Category	Nominee / Work	Result	Ref.
Asia Model Awards	2022	Best New Actress	The Witch: Part 2. The Other One	Won	
Baeksang Arts Awards	2026	Best New Actress – Film	Even If This Love Disappears From the World Tonight	Nominated	
Baeksang Arts Awards	2026	Best New Actress – Television	Resident Playbook	Nominated	
BIFF Marie Claire Asia Star Awards	2022	Rising Star Award	The Witch: Part 2. The Other One	Won	
Blue Dragon Film Awards	2022	Best New Actress	The Witch: Part 2. The Other One	Nominated	
Chunsa Film Art Awards	2022	Best New Actress	The Witch: Part 2. The Other One	Nominated	
Grand Bell Awards	2022	Best New Actress	The Witch: Part 2. The Other One	Nominated	

=== Listicles ===
Name of publisher, year listed, name of listicle, and placement
Publisher	Year	Listicle	Placement	Ref.
Cine21	2020	New Actress to watch out for in 2021	1st	
