= Kim Mu-yeol =

South Korean actor

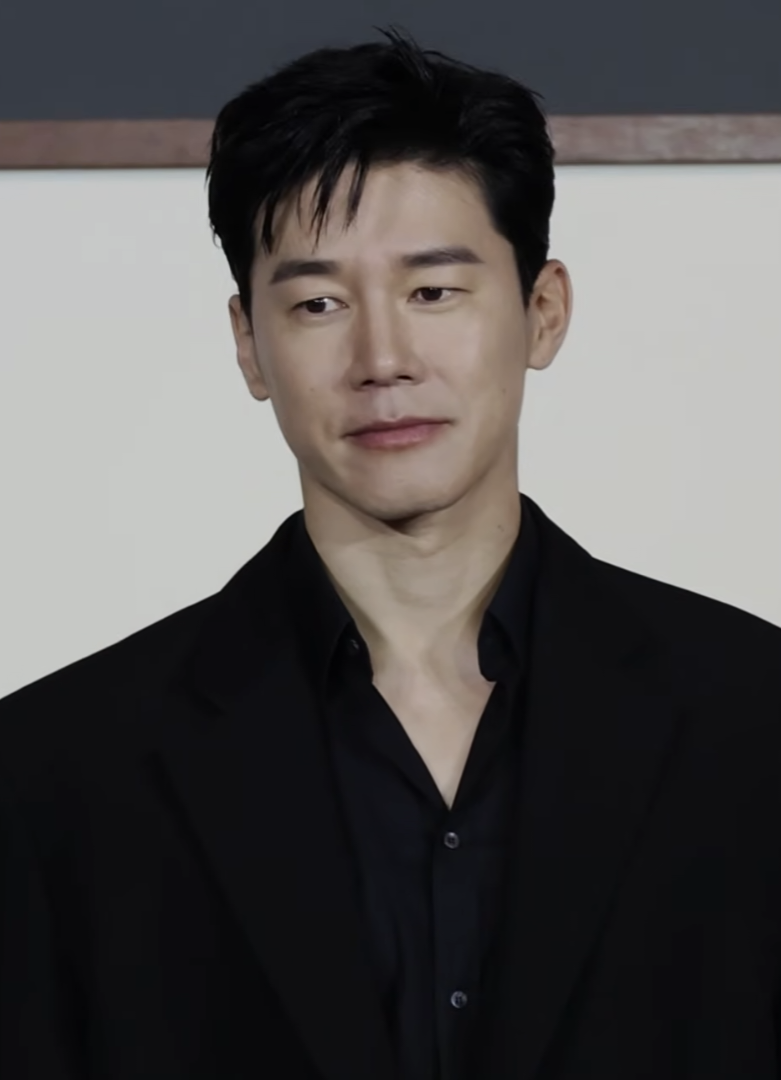
- Kim in June 2026
- Born: May 22, 1982 (age 44); Seoul, South Korea
- Other name: Kim Moo-yul
- Education: Sungkyunkwan University (Performing Arts)
- Occupation: Actor
- Years active: 2002–present
- Agent: Prain TPC
- Spouse: Yoon Seung-ah (m. 2015)
- Children: 1

Korean name
- Hangul: 김무열
- RR: Gim Muyeol
- MR: Kim Muyŏl

Kim Mu-yeol (Korean: 김무열; born May 22, 1982) is a South Korean actor. Following a successful career in musical theatre, Kim was first cast in minor parts on film and television. After gaining recognition for his performance in War of the Arrows (2011), Kim landed his first major role in Jung Ji-woo's critically acclaimed film A Muse (2012). Kim went on to star in the notable films Northern Limit Line (2015), Forgotten (2017), The Gangster, the Cop, the Devil (2019), Honest Candidate (2020), The Roundup: Punishment (2024) and the drama series Teach You a Lesson (2026).

== Early life and education ==
Kim Mu-yeol, born on May 22, 1982, given the name 'Mu-yeol-wang' by his grandfather with the hope that he would contribute to the reunification of North and South Korea. He had a humble upbringing, and in 1997, during his middle school years, his family faced financial difficulties due to the IMF crisis, and his father's health declined. As a result, Kim became the main provider for his family, putting his dreams of becoming a theater actor on hold. To make ends meet, he took on various part-time jobs and had to take multiple breaks from school.

Despite the strong opposition of his father, a civil servant, Kim Moo-yeol attended acting school since middle school and dreamed of becoming an actor. He went one step closer to his dream by attending Anyang Arts High School. While attending Anyang Arts High School, Kim participated in a performance called "Sins of this World," where he portrayed the role of an old man. Balancing his studies with part-time work became a necessity for him. He took on a range of jobs, including construction work, building security, distributing flyers, event assistance, safety guard, working in a cellphone factory, and part-time positions at a department store. In his pursuit of earning more money, he even ventured into nightclubs, but this period of his life was marked by desperation and uncertainty. He resorted to drinking and neglected his well-being, resulting in a weight gain from 70 kg to 100 kg. One day, after a night of drinking, he had a moment of realization and decided to change his lifestyle. He started exercising, quit drinking and smoking, and regained his determination. Despite his challenging circumstances, Kim performed exceptionally well on the college entrance exam, despite his poor high school grades, and was admitted to the Acting Department of Sungkyunkwan University.

Throughout his journey, Kim Mu-yeol never abandoned his passion for acting. He continued to navigate the delicate balance between making a living and pursuing his dreams. His father died in 2010.

== Career ==
He made his debut in 2002 with the musical "Jjangtta" and dedicated four years to honing his skills as part of the ensemble. In 2005, he gained recognition by successfully auditioning for the play "Subway Line 1" by Hakjeon Theater Company, catching the attention of Shin Chun-soo, the representative of O-Dream Music Company. This led to his lead roles in productions such as "Assassin" and "Grease."

In 2006, Kim participated in the musical Altar Boyz, which took place at the Chungmu Art Hall Grand Theater in Seoul from May 12 to May 21. Altar Boyz presents a narrative centered around a five-member Christian boy band, self-proclaimed pop evangelists with a mission to rescue troubled souls. Kim Tae-woo, played the role of Matthew, the lead character, with musical actor Song Yong-jin, who shared the role as well.

Kim's career flourished, and he on various roles in popular works including Singin' in the Rain, Thrill Me and Finding Mr. Destiny.

In 2007, Kim joined the domestic premiere of the musical Thrill Me, and made a lasting impression with his portrayal of child murderers Richard/Nathan.

The same year, Kim made his television debut in the KBS2TV one-act drama "Drama City - For the New Wave," where he played the role of Song Hyeon-wook, a noble and gentle man unable to forget his first love. He also appeared in the drama "Chosun Police," which aired on the 'MBC Dramanet' channel. Set in the Joseon Dynasty, the drama featured Kim as the youngest police officer conducting research in the investigation lab to solve cases.

As Kim made strides in the world of theater, he also explored opportunities in television and film, initially taking on smaller roles. One notable moment came in 2009 when he caught the attention of audiences with his supporting role as a bond broker named Jo Min-hyung in the film The Scam (produced by Silk Road, directed by Lee Ho-jae). Jo Min-hyung is portrayed as the Korean stock strategy ace, harboring the belief that dark money governs the nation's economy. Period action epic War of the Arrows became one of the biggest hits of 2011 and further raised his profile. He continued to showcase his versatility by appearing in the South Korean premiere of the musical Jack the Ripper and starring in the drama Wife Returns.

He won Best Actor at the 2009 Korea Musical Awards for his portrayal of Melchior in Spring Awakening, a rock musical which dealt with such taboo subjects as teenage pregnancy, sexual and physical abuse, and homosexuality.

In 2010, Kim Mu-yeol took on his previous role as child murderers Richard/Nathan in the musical "Thrill Me." The production also featured talented performers such as Choi Soo-hyung, Choi Ji-ho, Choi Jae-woong, Kim Ha-neul, Ji Chang-wook, Kim Jae-beom, and Jo Kang-hyeon. The musical was held at The Stage in Sinchon and ran from the 14th to November 14.

Kim's rugged appearance and charismatic presence propelled him to be recognized as a promising talent. Among the roles he's played on stage were Gwanghwamun Love Song and The Three Musketeers.

In 2011, Kim was chosen to join the cast of the musical Guys and Dolls alongside Ok Joo-hyun, Jin-gu, Lee Yong-woo, Kim Young-joo, Lee Yul, and Jeong Seon-ah. Kim took on the role of Sky Masterson in the production. The musical ran from August 2 to September 18, at the LG Arts Center in Yeoksam-dong, Seoul.

In 2012, Kim rose to stardom following his remarkable performance in the provocative and psychologically rich film A Muse. He portrayed the conflicted novelist Seo Ji-woo, who becomes envious of his teacher's genius talent, portrayed by Park Hae-il.

In 2012, Kim went to Japan on July 19, to perform the musical "Thrill Me" alongside Choi Jae-woong. The Japan performances had been scheduled well in advance, and they were set to perform a total of five shows. The musical was co-produced by Musical Haven and Horipro, a Japanese entertainment company, aiming to bring the production to a broader audience. The Japanese version of "Thrill Me" featured a cast and crew composed of both Japanese and Korean members. The production was directed by Tamiya Kuriyama, the former artistic director of the New National Theater in Tokyo. While most of the performances were conducted in Japanese, five of the 27 shows were performed in Korean.

Kim returned to acting upon his military discharge in 2014. He starred in Northern Limit Line in 2015, a naval thriller about the Second Battle of Yeonpyeong.

He was cast as leading man in Bad Guys.

== Personal life ==
=== Military service ===
In June 2012, Kim came under growing public criticism over allegations he dodged his compulsory military service. In a report released by the Korean Board of Audit and Inspection (BAI), Kim was deemed fit to serve in active duty as a level two recruit after a March 2001 physical examination. However, throughout 2007 to 2009, Kim was granted postponement on the grounds that he was taking civil service examinations or had been admitted to a work training facility, neither of which took place. During this time he reportedly earned approximately ₩300 million from films, musicals, and television work. In December 2009, he received his final notice for enlistment, having used up the 730 days allowed for postponement. He submitted a request to change his military status in January 2010 because of a knee injury, which was rejected. Finally, a valid exemption was granted on the grounds that he was a "low-income individual" and the sole provider for his family. BAI's contention was that Kim's income is substantially higher than the standard for disqualification due to poverty; thus, the Military Manpower Administration was negligent in their duties by granting the exemption.

Kim's agency Prain TPC defended him, stating that Kim had been supporting his family by working as a security guard, construction worker, and at a mobile phone factory since his late teens. When his father collapsed from a cerebral hemorrhage and was diagnosed with cancer in 2008, the treatments incurred a lot of debt for the family. Their worsening financial condition caused them to become totally dependent on Kim, resulting in his said filing for an exemption in 2010.

Given the publicity, a reinvestigation into the case was launched and Kim was asked by the production company to leave the film 11 A.M. (he was replaced by Choi Daniel).

On October 4, 2012, Kim released a statement that though there was no wrongdoing on his part, he had decided to voluntarily enter the army "to recover his honor damaged by the rumors."

In January 2013, Kim starred in military musical The Promise. It was co-produced by the Ministry of National Defense and Korea Musical Theatre Association, to commemorate the 60th anniversary of the signing of the armistice. It ran from January 9 to 20 at the National Theater of Korea, with a cast composed of actors Ji Hyun-woo and Jung Tae-woo, as well as singers Leeteuk of Super Junior, Yoon Hak of Supernova, and Lee Hyun of 8Eight. The musical centered around a group of soldiers who keep a promise made to each other during the 6.25 war. When the "entertainment soldiers" unit was disbanded in August 2013, Kim was reassigned to a frontline combat unit of the 12th Infantry Division headquartered in Inje County, Gangwon Province.

In February 2014, Kim underwent surgery to treat a cartilage injury in his left knee, and afterwards received rehabilitation treatment for nearly two months at a military hospital near Seoul. Criticism was raised regarding his lengthy sick leave, but the defense ministry refused to provide detailed information regarding Kim's health condition, arguing that it was an infringement on his privacy.

Kim was discharged on July 8, 2014.

=== Marriage and family ===
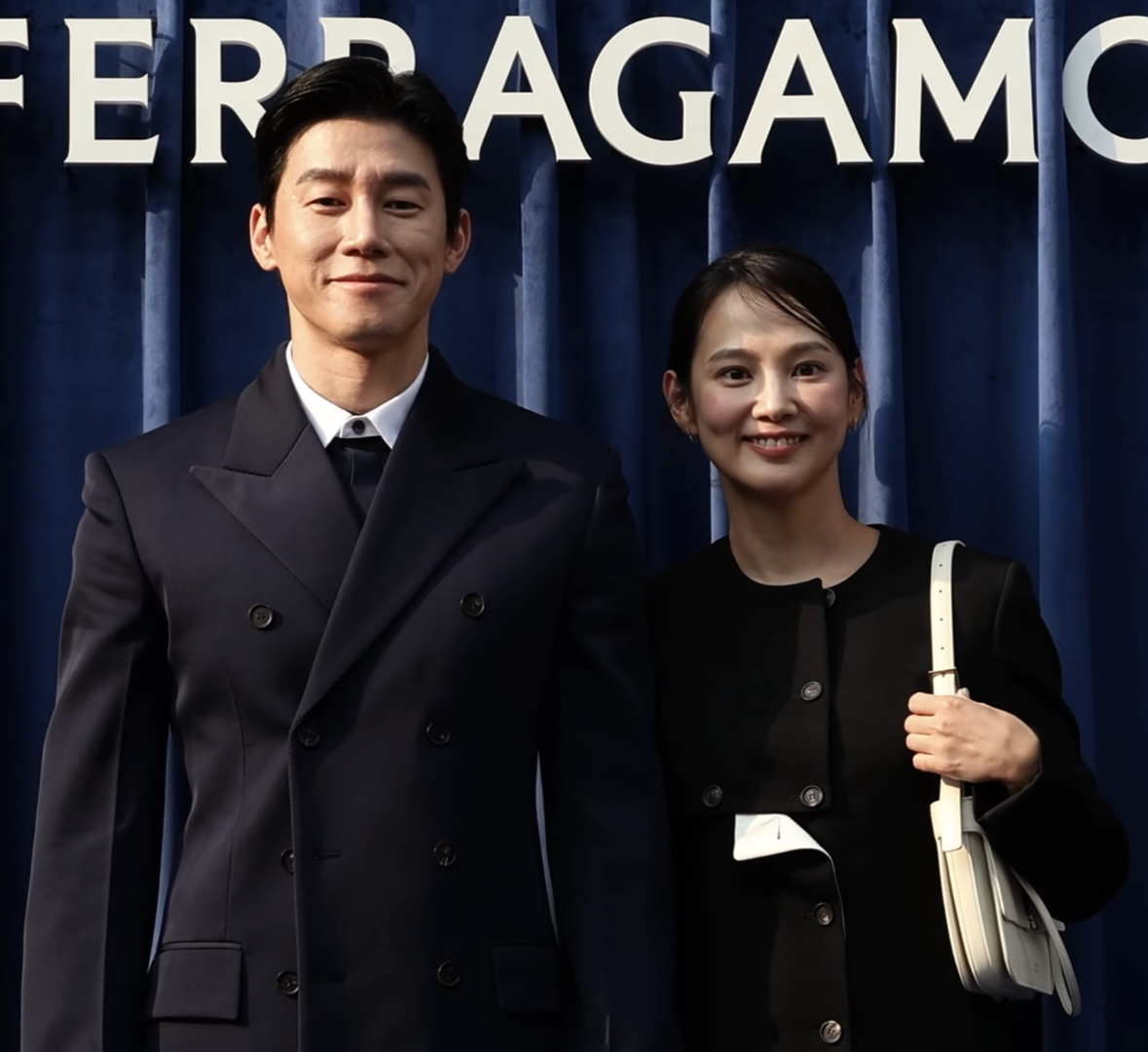
Kim and Yoon in 2026

After a romantic tweet that Kim meant to be a private message to Yoon Seung-ah was accidentally posted on the actor's Twitter page, their agencies confirmed in February 2012 that the two were dating. Kim and Yoon married on April 4, 2015.

In December 2022, their agency announced that Yoon is pregnant with the couple's first child and expected to give birth in June 2023. Yoon gave birth to a son, Kim Tae-myeong, on June 8, 2023.

== Filmography ==
Key
†	Denotes films that have not yet been released

=== Film ===
Year	Title	Role	Notes	Ref.
2009	The Scam	Jo Min-hyeong		
2010	Finding Mr. Destiny	Airline employee	Cameo	
2011	Romantic Heaven	Dong Chi-sung	Cameo	
2011	War of the Arrows	Seo-goon		
2012	Doomsday Book	Ji-ho	Special appearance	
2012	Eungyo	Seo Ji-woo		
2012	All Bark No Bite	Sang-keun		
2015	Northern Limit Line	Yoon Young-ha		
2017	Warriors of the Dawn	Gok-soo		
2017	Forgotten	Yoo-seok		
2018	Snatch Up	Min-jae		
2018	Illang: The Wolf Brigade	Han Sang-woo		
2019	The Gangster, The Cop, The Devil	Jung Tae-suk		
2020	Honest Candidate	Park Hee-cheol		
2020	Intruder	Kang Seo-jin		
2021	Space Sweepers	Kang Hyeon-u	Special appearance	
2021	On the Line	Pro Kwak		
2022	Honest Candidate 2	Park Hee-cheol		
2023	The Devil's Deal	Kim Pil-do		
2023	Ballerina	Chief-Jo	Special appearance	
2024	The Roundup: Punishment	Baek Chang-ki		
2025	The Old Woman with the Knife	Ryoo		

=== Television series ===
Year	Title	Role	Notes	Ref.
2007	Drama City "For The New School"	Hyun-wook		
2007–2008	Chosun Police	Oh-deok		
2008	Iljimae	Si-wan		
2009	Wife Returns	Han Kang-soo		
2010	John and Rugalda, Two Virgin Spouses	John / Yoo Jung-cheol		
2015	My Beautiful Bride	Kim Do-hyung		
2017	Bad Guys 2	No Jin-pyeong		
2022	Juvenile Justice	Cha Tae-joo		
2022	Grid	Song Eo-jin		
2022–2023	Trolley	Jang Woo-jae		
2023	Sweet Home	Kim Young-hoo	Season 2–3	
2023	High Cookie	Yoo Seong-pil		
2024	No Way Out: The Roulette	Lee Sang-bong		
2024	Queen Woo	Eul Pa-so		
2026	Teach You a Lesson	Na Hwa-jin		
TBA	Knock-Off †	Baek Jong-min	Special appearance	

== Theater ==
=== Musicals ===
Year	Title		Role	Theater	Date	Ref.
Year	English	Korean	Role	Theater	Date	Ref.
2003	Jjangdda	짱따		Cultural Arts Foundation Arts Theater Small Theater	February 15 to 28	
2003	Jjangdda	짱따		Chuncheon Museum Outdoor Stage	August 15	
2003	Jjangdda	짱따		Hwacheon Boys High School Auditorium	August 27	
2003	Jjangdda	짱따		Hongcheon Duchon Middle School Outdoor Stage	August 28	
2003	Jjangdda	짱따		Inje Kirin High School Auditorium	August 29	
2005–2006	Subway Line 1	지하철 1호선	Multi-roles	Hakjeon Green Small Theater in Daehakro	2005 to March 29, 2006	
2005	Assassins	암살자들	John Hinckley	Seoul Arts Center CJ Towol Theater	July 9, 2005 – July 30, 2005	
2005	Grease	그리스	Danny Zuko	Dongsoong Art Center Dongsoong Hall	October 1, 2005 – January 1, 2006	
2006	Singin' in the Rain	패션 오브 더 레인	K	Inkel Art Hall	October 1, 2006 – November 30, 2006	
2006–2007	Singin' in the Rain	패션 오브 더 레인	K	Inkel Art Hall	December 29, 2006 – January 1, 2007	
2006	Altar Boyz	알타보이즈	Luke	Chungmu Art Center Main Theater	April 11, 2006 – May 21, 2006	
2006	Altar Boyz	알타보이즈	Luke	Hoam Art Hall	July 15, 2006 – August 27, 2006	
2007	Thrill Me	쓰릴미	Richard Loeb, Nathan	Chungmu Art Center Chungmu Hall Black	March 17, 2007 – May 13, 2007	
2007	Thrill Me	쓰릴미	Richard Loeb, Nathan	JTN Art Hall 1	May 22, 2007 – July 22, 2007	
2007	Singin' in the Rain	패션 오브 더 레인	Don Lockwood			
2007	Finding Kim Jong-wook	김종욱 찾기	Kim Jong-wook & First Love	JTN Art Hall 1	October 23, 2007 – February 17, 2013	
2008	Thrill Me	쓰릴미	Richard	Chungmu Art Center Main Theater Black	June 28, 2008 – October 12, 2008	
2008	The Happy Life	즐거운 인생	Sae-ki	Chungmu Art Center Main Theater Black	November 21, 2008 – February 8, 2009	
2009	The Happy Life	즐거운 인생	Sae-ki	Daegu Sudong Art Pia Yongji Hall	March 14, 2009 – March 15, 2009	
2009	The Happy Life	즐거운 인생	Sae-ki	Chungnam National University Jeongsimhwa International Cultural Center Jeongsimhwa Hall, Daejeon	April 4, 2009 – April 5, 2009	
2009	Spring Awakening	스프링 어웨이크닝	Melchior	Doosan Art Center Yeonkang Hall	June 30, 2009 – January 10, 2010	
2009	Jack the Ripper	살인마 잭	Daniel	Universal Art Center	November 13, 2009 – January 31, 2010	
2009	Jack the Ripper	살인마 잭	Daniel	Yeungnam University Cheonma Art Center Grand Hall, Daegu	December 24, 2009 – December 26, 2009	
2010	Thrill Me	쓰릴미	Nathan	The Stage	May 12, 2010 – November 14, 2010	
2010	The Three Musketeers	삼총사	d'Artagnan	Chungmu Art Center Main Theater	December 15, 2010 – January 30, 2011	
2011	The Three Musketeers	삼총사	d'Artagnan	Daejeon Arts Center Art Hall	February 19, 2011 – February 20, 2011	
2011	The Three Musketeers	삼총사	d'Artagnan	Daegu Keimyung Art Center	February 26, 2011 – February 27, 2011	
2011	The Three Musketeers	삼총사	d'Artagnan	Goyang Aram Nuri Arts Center Aram Theater	March 19, 2011 – March 20, 2011	
2011	Gwanghwamun Love Song	광화문 연가	Hyun-woo	Sejong Center for the Performing Arts Main Theater	March 20, 2011 – April 10, 2011	
2011	The Three Musketeers	삼총사	d'Artagnan	Gwangju Culture and Arts Center Main Theater	April 8, 2011 – April 10, 2011	
2011	The Three Musketeers	삼총사	d'Artagnan	Busan Citizens' Hall Main Theater	April 16, 2011 – April 17, 2011	
2011	Gwanghwamun Love Song	광화문연가	Hyun-woo	Gwangju Culture and Arts Center Main Theater	April 22, 2011 – April 24, 2011	
2011	Gwanghwamun Love Song	광화문연가	Hyun-woo	Daegu Keimyung Art Center	April 29, 2011 – May 1, 2011	
2011	Gwanghwamun Love Song	광화문연가	Hyun-woo	Goyang Aram Nuri Arts Center Aram Theater	May 20, 2011 – May 22, 2011	
2011	Gwanghwamun Love Song	광화문연가	Hyun-woo	Ansan Culture & Arts Center Haedoji Theater	June 24, 2011 – June 26, 2011	
2011	Guys and Dolls	아가씨와 건달들	Sky Masterson	LG Art Center	August 2, 2011 – September 18, 2011	
2011	Guys and Dolls	아가씨와 건달들	Sky Masterson	Gwangju Culture and Arts Center Main Theater	October 7, 2011 – October 9, 2011	
2011	Guys and Dolls	아가씨와 건달들	Sky Masterson	Korean Sound and Culture Hall Moak Hall, Jeonju	October 21, 2011 – October 23, 2011	
2011	Guys and Dolls	아가씨와 건달들	Sky Masterson	Ulsan Culture and Arts Center Grand Theater	November 12, 2011 – November 13, 2011	
2011	Guys and Dolls	아가씨와 건달들	Sky Masterson	Anyang Art Center Grand Theater (Gwanak Hall)	November 19, 2011 – November 20, 2011	
2011	Guys and Dolls	아가씨와 건달들	Sky Masterson	Chungnam National University Jeongsimhwa International Cultural Center Jeongsimhwa Hall, Daejeon	December 2, 2011 – December 4, 2011	
2011	Guys and Dolls	아가씨와 건달들	Sky Masterson	Cheonma Art Center, Daegu	December 16, 2011 – December 18, 2011	
2011	Guys and Dolls	아가씨와 건달들	Sky Masterson	Busan Cinema Center Sky Theater	December 31, 2011 – January 1, 2012	
2012	Thrill Me (Japan)	쓰릴미	Richard/Nathan	Galaxy Theater in Tokyo, Japan	July 19 to 29	
2012	Gwanghwamun Love Song	광화문 연가	Hyun-woo	Chungmu Art Center Main Theater	May 13, 2012 – June 3, 2012	
2012	Gwanghwamun Love Song	광화문 연가	Hyun-woo	Daegu Keimyung Art Center	June 22, 2012 – June 24, 2012	
2012	Gwanghwamun Love Song	광화문 연가	Hyun-woo	Jeju Arts Center	June 30, 2012 – July 1, 2012	
2012	Gwanghwamun Love Song	광화문 연가	Hyun-woo	Incheon Culture and Arts Center Grand Theater	August 24, 2012 – August 26, 2012	
2012	Gwanghwamun Love Song	광화문 연가	Hyun-woo	Korean Sound and Culture Hall Moak Hall, Jeonju	September 1, 2012 – September 2, 2012	
2012	Gwanghwamun Love Song	광화문 연가	Hyun-woo	Gwangju Culture and Arts Center Main Theater	October 6, 2012 – October 7, 2012	
2013	The Promise	프라미스	Sang-jin	National Theater Haerorum Theater	January 8, 2013 – January 20, 2013	
2013	The Promise	프라미스	Sang-jin	National Theater Haerorum Theater	February 15, 2013 – March 2, 2013	
2013	The Promise	프라미스	Sang-jin	Daegu Gyeongnam Art Center	March 21, 2013 – March 24, 2013	
2014	Kinky Boots	킹키부츠	Charlie Price	Chungmu Art Center Main Theater	December 2, 2014 – February 22, 2015	
2016	Gone Tomorrow	곤 투모로우	Hong Jong-woo	Gwanglim Art Center BBCH Hall	September 13, 2016 – November 6, 2016	
2016	Frozen	얼음	Detective 2	Yes24 Stage 3	February 13, 2016 – March 20, 2016	
2017	Thrill Me	쓰릴미	Nathan	Baekam Art Hall	February 14, 2017 – May 28, 2017	

=== Plays ===
Year	Title		Role	Venue	Date	Ref.
Year	English	Korean	Role	Venue	Date	Ref.
2005	Myeongdong Blues	명동 블루스				
2006	Bindaetteok Gentleman	빈대떡 신사				
2007	Gangtaek-gu	강택구				
2007	Mad Kiss	미친키스	Jang Jung	Daehak-ro Installation Theatre Jeongmiso	September 5 – October 21	
2007–2008	Mad Kiss	미친키스	Jang Jung	Daehak-ro Installation Theatre Jeongmiso	December 8, 2007 – March 2, 2008	
2008	Fish man	물고기 남자	Understudy, Planning			
2009	Zoo Story	동물원 이야기	Jerry			
2011	One Guy, Two Guys, Riding on a Bumpy Road	한놈 두놈 삑구타고	Ho-jun	The Theater	July 1, 2011 – July 10, 2011	
2016	Ice	얼음	Detective 1 (Cho Doo-man)	Yes 24 Stage 3	February 13 to March 20, 2016	

== Discography ==
=== Soundtrack appearances ===
Year	Song title	Notes
2009	"Mandy"	Track from Wife Returns OST

== Accolades ==
=== Awards and nominations ===
Year	Award	Category	Nominated work	Result
2000	Dongrang Youth Arts Festival	Excellence Award, Actor	The Sins of the World	Won
2007	1st Daegu International Musical Festival	Best New Actor	Altar Boyz	Won
2007	1st The Musical Awards	Best Supporting Actor	Thrill Me	Nominated
2009	15th Korea Musical Awards	Best Actor	Spring Awakening	Won
2009	30th Blue Dragon Film Awards	Best New Actor	The Scam	Nominated
2010	46th Baeksang Arts Awards	Best New Actor (Film)	The Scam	Nominated
2010	SBS Drama Awards	Best Supporting Actor in a Weekend/Daily Drama	Wife Returns	Nominated
2012	21st Buil Film Awards	Best Supporting Actor	A Muse	Nominated
2018	KBS Drama Awards	Best Actor in a One-Act/Special/Short Drama	Forgotten Season	Nominated
2023	28th Chunsa Film Art Awards	Best Supporting Actor	The Devil's Deal	Nominated
2023	SBS Drama Awards	Top Excellence Award, Actor in a Seasonal Drama	Trolley	Nominated
2026	Beautiful Art Awards (Shin Young-kyun Arts and Culture Foundation)	Motion Picture and Television Arts Awards	Kim Mu-yeol	Won
2026	1st Icon Awards	Icon of the Year	Kim Mu-yeol	Won

=== Listicles ===
Name of publisher, year listed, name of listicle, and placement
Publisher	Year	Listicle	Placement	Ref.
Korean Film Council	2021	Korean Actors 200 (Note: Introduces 200 actors that best represent the present and future of Korean cinema to the people in the film industry all over the world.)	Included	
The Screen	2019	2009–2019 Top Box Office Powerhouse Actors in Korean Movies	46th	
