= Kang You-seok =

South Korean actor (born 1994)

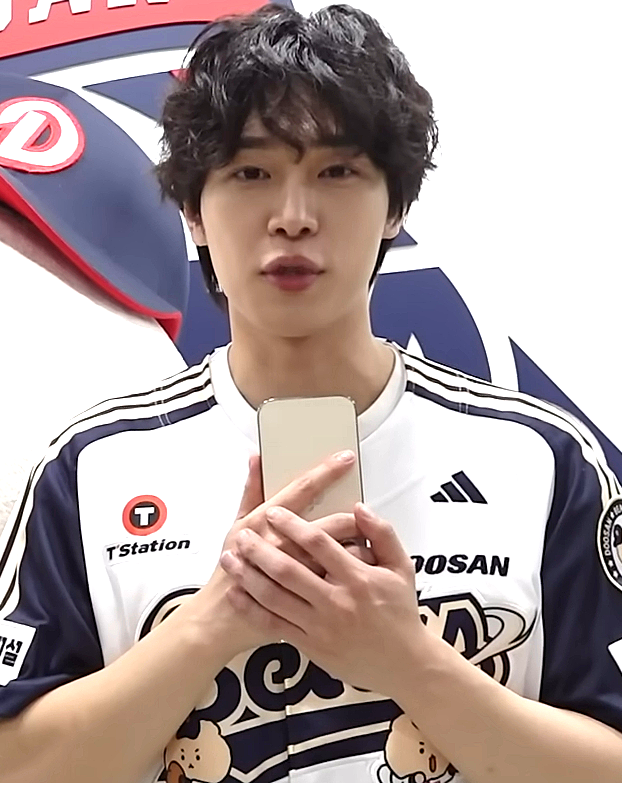
- Kang in 2025
- Born: Kang Shin-cheol; June 10, 1994 (age 32); Gangneung, South Korea
- Education: Korea National University of Arts
- Occupation: Actor
- Years active: 2018–present
- Agent: Just Entertainment

Korean name
- Hangul: 강신철
- RR: Gang Sincheol
- MR: Kang Sinch'ŏl

Stage name
- Hangul: 강유석
- Hanja: 姜有皙
- RR: Gang Yuseok
- MR: Kang Yusŏk

Kang Shin-cheol (Korean: 강신철; born June 10, 1994), better known by the stage name Kang You-seok (강유석), is a South Korean actor. He began his career in 2018 with minor roles. He first gained attention for starring in the television series Light on Me (2021), Payback: Money and Power (2023), and Black Knight (2023) before coming to wider recognition for dramas When Life Gives You Tangerines (2025) and Resident Playbook (2025).

== Early life and education ==
Born Kang Shin-cheol on June 10, 1994, in Gangneung, South Korea, as the second of four siblings, he has an older sister, a younger brother, and a younger sister. His aspiration to become an actor began in high school. His parents initially opposed his ambition, urging him to "just live an ordinary life" and questioning his prospects in acting. Despite their opposition, Kang persevered. After a year of preparation, he was admitted to the acting department of Korea National University of Arts as a 14th-batch student. Upon witnessing his son's acceptance to a prestigious acting college, his parents eventually became supportive.

== Career ==
=== 2018 to 2023: Beginnings ===
Kang's journey into acting was challenging. He faced rejection at auditions for a year and a half before landing his first role. Despite the setbacks, he remained committed to acting.

He made his debut in the 2018 OCN drama God's Quiz: Reboot. From there, he took on minor and supporting roles in various series like The Hymn of Death (2018), Dr. Romantic 2 (2020), Start-Up (2020), and Beyond Evil (2021). Since his debut, he has actively sought diverse experiences, taking on roles regardless of their size or genre, including a role in the boys' love production Light on Me (2021). This open-minded approach has allowed him to steadily build his career.

In 2023, his sixth year as an actor, Kang was cast in a leading role in the terrestrial drama Payback: Money and Power. That same year, he appeared in the Netflix dystopian series Black Knight. Kang played Yoon Sa-wol, a refugee desperate to become a "Knight," a delivery driver, which is the only means of survival in the polluted future depicted in the series. His character deeply admires the legendary Knight 5-8, played by Kim Woo-bin, and strives to follow in his footsteps.

=== 2025 to present: Wider recognition ===
In 2025, Kang gained wider recognition with two dramas available to stream on Netflix: the Netflix original series When Life Gives You Tangerines and the drama Resident Playbook. In When Life Gives You Tangerines, Kang played the supporting role of Yang Eun-myeong, the son of the main characters Ae-sun (Moon So-ri) and Gwan-sik (Park Hae-joon), as well as younger brother of Geum-myeong (IU). His performance received positive reviews, earning him the 10th spot on Good Data Corporation's list of buzzworthy actors in the third week of March. He is also nominated as Best New Actor at the 2025 Blue Dragon Series Awards.

For tvN medical drama Resident Playbook, a spin-off of Hospital Playlist that originally planned for a 2024 release, Kang was cast as Um Jae-il, a former K-pop idol and the only male first-year obstetrics and gynecology resident at Jongno Yulje Hospital. To prepare for the role, Kang learned how to dance. His role placed him as high as fourth on Good Data Corporation's list of most buzzworthy actors. Despite a delay in airing, the drama's success led to Kang's first reward vacation to Bali with the cast and crew.

== Filmography ==
=== Film ===
Year	Title	Role	Notes	Ref.
2018	Moving			
2020	The Interviewees			
2021	Ghost Mansion	Tae-hun		
2021	Distant Summer	Saebyok	Short film	
2022	The Flatterer	Kang Dae-chi		
2026	Final Interview	Lee Hee-chan		

=== Television series ===
Year	Title	Role	Notes	Ref.
2018	Quiz of God			
2018	The Hymn of Death			
2019	Love As You Taste			
2019	Melting Me Softly	Park Young-joon		
2020	Dr. Romantic	Joon-young	Season 2; Episode 8	
2020	Mystic Pop-up Bar	Jin-tae		
2020	Once Again	Han Gi-young		
2020	Start-Up	Shin-hyeon		
2020	Growing Season	Wi Seon-u		
2021	Beyond Evil	Lim Gyu-seok		
2021	Light on Me	Noh Shin-woo		
2021	2021 Summer Drama Collage: Monster Mansion	Tae Hun	Episode 6	
2021	Best Mistake	Noh Shin-woo	Season 3; Episode 4	
2022	I Have Not Done My Best Yet	Kang Du-seok		
2023	Payback: Money and Power	Jang Tae-chun		
2023	Black Knight	Yoon Sa-wol		
2025	When Life Gives You Tangerines	Yang Eun-myeong		
2025	Resident Playbook	Um Jae-il		
2025	Law and the City	Cho Chang-won		
TBA	The Mentalist	Kang Yeon-u		
TBA	Solo Leveling	Yoo Jin-ho		

=== Music video appearances ===
Year	Artist	Title	Notes
2017	Lee Min-hyuk (BtoB)	"Summer Diary" (夏の日記)	Japanese single
2025	Tomorrow X Together (Note: Also sang by HI-BOYZ, a fictional boy group in the drama Resident Playbook.)	"When the Day Comes" (그날이 오면)	Resident Playbook OST
2025	Bibi	"Apocalypse" (종말의 사과나무)	Eve: Romance

== Discography ==
=== Soundtrack appearances ===
List of soundtrack singles, showing year released and selected chart positions
Title	Year	Peak chart positions	Notes
Title	Year	KOR	Notes
"A Race" (달리기) (with Go Youn-jung, Shin Si-ah, Han Ye-ji)	2025	96	Resident Playbook OST

== Awards and nominations ==
Name of the award ceremony, year presented, category, nominee of the award, and the result of the nomination
Award ceremony	Year	Category	Nominee / Work	Result	Ref.
APAN Star Awards	2025	Best New Actor	Resident Playbook, When Life Gives You Tangerines	Won	
Asia Artist Awards	2025	Emotive Award – Actor	Kang You-seok	Won	
Blue Dragon Series Awards	2025	Best New Actor	When Life Gives You Tangerines	Nominated	
Fundex Awards	2025	Best Supporting Male Performer on OTT	When Life Gives You Tangerines	Nominated	
Global OTT Awards	2025	Best New Actor	Resident Playbook	Won	
SBS Drama Awards	2023	Best New Actor	Payback: Money and Power	Won	
