= The Magician (2015 film) =

- Official poster
- Hangul: 조선마술사
- Hanja: 朝鮮魔術師
- RR: Joseonmasulsa
- MR: Chosŏnmasulsa
- Directed by: Kim Dae-seung
- Screenplay by: Kim Dae-seung; Jeon Sung-bin; Jo Won-hee; Jo Jung-hwa
- Story by: Kim Tak-hwan; Lee Won-tae
- Starring: Yoo Seung-ho; Go Ara; Kwak Do-won
- Cinematography: Cho Sang-yun
- Edited by: Lee Jin
- Music by: Bang Jun-seok
- Production company: withUs Film
- Distributed by: Lotte Entertainment
- Release date: December 30, 2015 (South Korea)
- Country: South Korea
- Language: Korean
- Box office: US$4.1 million

The Magician (Korean: 조선마술사; RR: Joseonmasulsa; lit. 'Joseon Magician') is a 2015 South Korean period fantasy film directed by Kim Dae-seung. The film was released in December 2015.

== Plot ==
A story of the famous magician in Joseon Era who fell in love with a princess who is a fiancé of the prince of the Qing dynasty.

== Cast ==
=== Main ===
- Yoo Seung-ho as Hwan-hee
- Go Ara as Cheong-myeong
- Kwak Do-won as Gwi-mol

=== Supporting ===
- Jo Yoon-hee as Bo-eum
- Jang Yoo-sang as Meok-soi
- Lee Jin-kwon as Hwan-hee's equipment team member
- Lee Geung-young
- Park Chul-min
- Jo Dal Hwan
- Son Byong-ho
- Yeom Hye-ran

== Reception ==
The film debuted in sixth place at the Korean box-office and grossed US$3.21 million on its opening week.
