= Moon So-ri filmography =

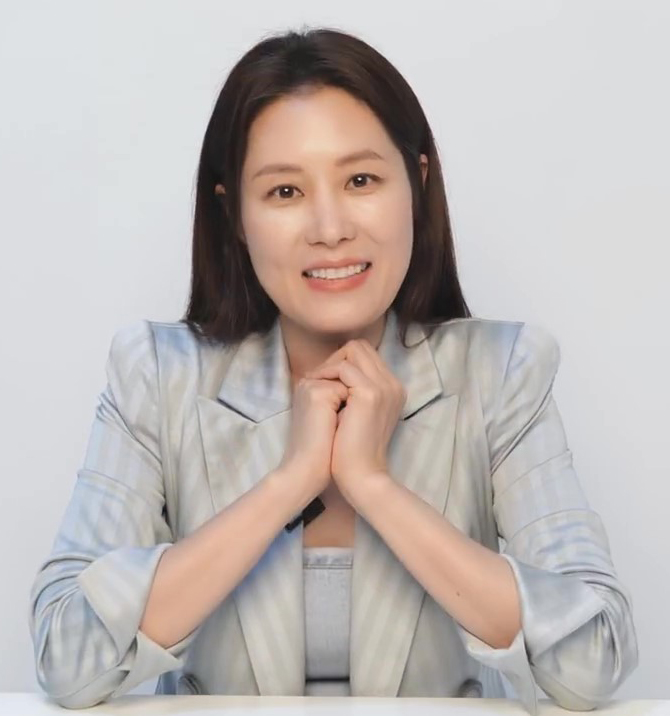
- Moon (2021)
- Film: 15
- Television series: 15
- Television show: 3
- Documentary: 3
- Music videos: 1

Moon So-ri (Korean: 문소리; born July 2, 1974) is a South Korean actress and filmmaker whose work encompasses film, television, and theater. She has also contributed as a voice actress and narrator in films.

Moon is recognized for her early collaborations with influential auteur directors, which led to significant international recognition. Her feature film debut was in Lee Chang-dong's Peppermint Candy (1999). Her subsequent role in Lee Chang-dong's Oasis (2002) served as a career breakthrough; her performance as a woman with cerebral palsy garnered the Marcello Mastroianni Award at the 59th Venice International Film Festival, making her the second South Korean to achieve this award.

Further critical recognition, both domestically and internationally, was secured with her role in Im Sang-soo's A Good Lawyer's Wife (2003). Her filmography includes multiple collaborations with director Hong Sang-soo, notably in Like You Know It All (2009), Ha Ha Ha (2010), and In Another Country (2012). She also acted a supporting role in Park Chan-wook's critically successful film The Handmaiden (2016). More recent film credits include the critically praised Three Sisters (2020) and the Netflix production Seoul Vibe (2022).

Moon expanded her professional career by moving into filmmaking as a director and screenwriter. Her feature-length directorial debut was the comedy-drama The Running Actress (2017). This film is an omnibus work that integrates three short films she created while enrolled in a Master of Fine Arts (MFA) program at Chung-Ang University. The Running Actress is a self-deprecatory, fictionalized film, written by and starring Moon herself, that addresses the challenges and public scrutiny of women in the Korean film industry. The film premiered internationally at various festivals, establishing her as a filmmaker. She was also credited as a producer for the critically acclaimed film Three Sisters (2020), in which she also starred.

Moon has maintained a consistent, though less frequent, presence in television since her debut in the historical drama The Legend (2007). Her television roles typically feature her in professional or mature characterizations, such as a career woman navigating family life in All About My Family (2008–2009) and the head of neurosurgery, Oh Se-hwa, in the medical drama Life (2018), as well as the ambitious team leader Dang Ja-young in the workplace series On the Verge of Insanity (2021). In recent years, she has increased her involvement with streaming platforms, starring in the Netflix original series The School Nurse Files (2020). She later led the political drama Queenmaker (2023) alongside Kim Hee-ae. Her most recent projects include a key role in the second season of Hellbound (2024) and the portrayal of middle-aged Ae-sun in the period series When Life Gives You Tangerines (2025).

== Documentary ==
Appearances in documentary
Year	Title	Role	Notes	Ref.
2005	The Nine Lives of Korean Cinema	Herself		
2011	Ari Ari the Korean Cinema	Herself		
2014	Manshin: Ten Thousand Spirits	Kim Geum-hwa (middle age)		

== Film ==
=== As actress ===
Acting credits in film
Year	Title	Role	Notes	Ref.
1998	The Power Of Love		Short film	
1999	Peppermint Candy	Yun Sun-im		
2000	Black Cut		Short film	
2001	To the Spring Mountain		Short film	
2001	Plan 19 From Outer Space		Short film	
2002	Oasis	Han Gong-ju		
2003	A Good Lawyer's Wife	Eun Ho-jung		
2004	The President's Barber	Kim Min-ja		
2005	Bravo, My Life!	Kim Mal-soon		
2005	Sa-kwa	Hyun-jung		
2006	Bewitching Attraction	Cho Eun-sook		
2006	Family Ties	Lee Mi-ra		
2008	Forever the Moment	Han Mi-sook		
2009	Take Action, Now or Never!		Short film	
2009	Fly, Penguin	Song Hee-jung		
2009	The End		Short film	
2010	A Little Pond	Refugee	Cameo	
2010	Ha Ha Ha	Wang Seong-ok		
2010	The Housemaid	Obstetrician	Cameo	
2012	In Another Country	Geum-hee		
2013	An Ethics Lesson	Kim Sun-hwa		
2013	The Spy: Undercover Operation	Young-hee		
2013	Venice 70: Future Reloaded			
2014	Venus Talk	Jo Mi-yeon		
2014	Hill of Freedom	Young-sun		
2014	The Actress	So-ri	Short film	
2014	Phantoms of the Archive		Short film	
2015	The Running Actress	So-ri	Short film	
2015	The Best Director	So-ri	Short film	
2015	Accompany		Short film	
2015	Love and...	Hospital janitor	Short film	
2016	The Handmaiden	Hideko's aunt	Cameo	
2016	Vanishing Time: A Boy Who Returned	Dr. Min	Cameo	
2017	The Mayor	Jung Jae-yi		
2017	The Running Actress	So-ri		
2018	Little Forest	Hye-won's mother		
2018	Ode to the Goose	Song-hyun		
2019	Juror 8	Kim Joon-gyeom		
2019	Maggie	Lee Kyeong-jin	Short film	
2021	Three Sisters	Mi-yeon		
2022	I Want to Know Your Parents	Gun-woo's mother		
2022	Seoul Vibe	Kang In-sook		

=== As voice actress ===
Acting credits as voice actress
Year	Title	Role	Notes	Ref.
2007	My Heart Is Not Broken Yet	Narrator	Documentary	
2009	Like You Know It All	Jecheon – Seoul woman	Cameo	
2011	Leafie, A Hen into the Wild	Leafie / Yipsak / Sprout / Dais	Animated film	
2017	1987: When the Day Comes	Woman on the P.A system	Cameo	
2018	The Underdog		Animated film	

=== As filmmaker ===
Filmmaking credis
Year	Title	Role	Notes	Ref.
2014	The Actress	director, screenwriter, and producer	19th Busan International Film Festival – Short Film Showcase	
2015	The Running Actress	director, screenwriter, and producer	Jeonju International Film Festival – Korea Cinemascape for Shorts	
2015	The Best Director	director, screenwriter, and producer	20th Busan International Film Festival – Short Film Showcase	
2017	The Running Actress	director, screenwriter, and producer	Feature-length film (compilation of three shorts)	
2021	Three Sisters	producer	Premiere at 25th Busan International Film Festival	

== Television series ==
Acting credits in series
Year	Title	Role	Notes	Ref.
2007	The Legend	Seo Ki-ha	Television debut	
2008–2009	All About My Family	Lee Hwang		
2013	Drama Festival: "The Murder"	Jeong-boon	One-act drama	
2016	The Legend of the Blue Sea	Ahn Jin-joo		
2018	Life	Oh Se-hwa		
2020	SF8	Ga Hye-ra	Episode: "Empty Body"	
2020	The School Nurse Files	Hwa-soo	Special appearance	
2021	On the Verge of Insanity	Dang Ja-young		
2023	Queenmaker	Oh Kyung-sook		
2023	Race	Goo Yi-jeong		
2024	Jeongnyeon: The Star Is Born	Seo Yong-rye / Choi Gong-seo	Special appearance (episode 1, 3–5)	
2024	Hellbound	Lee Su-gyeong	Season 2	
2025	When Life Gives You Tangerines	Oh Ae-sun (Middle Age)		
2025	Oh My Ghost Clients	Moon Jung-eun	Cameo (episode 9–10)	
2025	Our Movie	Lee Da-eum's mother	Cameo (episode 2, 7, 12)	
2026	The Apartment Job	Jang Suk-jin		

== Television shows ==
Appearances in television shows
Year	Title	Role	Notes	Ref.
2014	Magic Eye	Host	with Lee Hyo-ri and Hong Jin-kyung	
2022	Off the Grid	Main Cast		
2022	Spectator +: Short Buster	Host	TVING	

== Music videos ==
Acting credit in music video
Year	Title	Artist(s)	Ref.
2003	"Flower of Tears" (눈물꽃)	Jung Jae-il	
