= List of awards and nominations received by Moon So-ri =

Moon So-ri awards and nominations
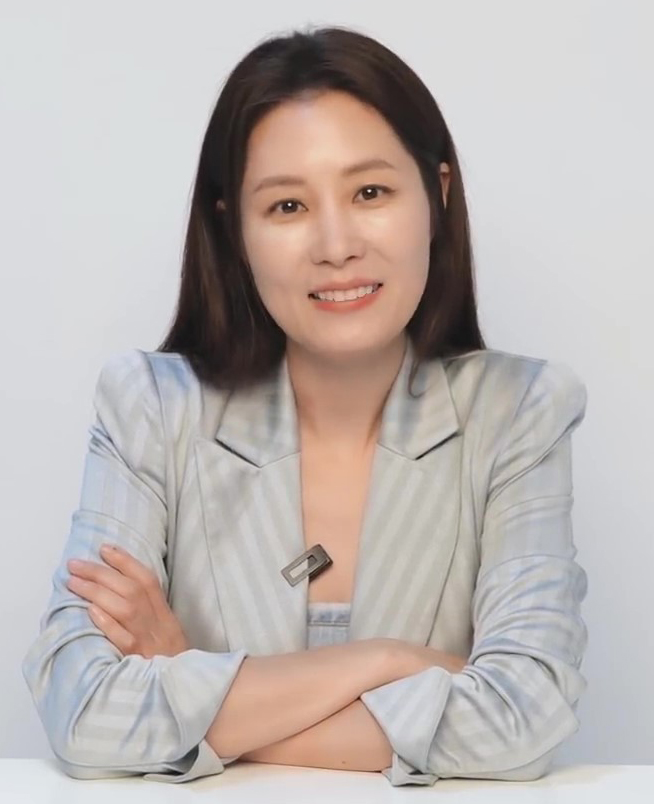
- Moon in 2021
Awards and nominations
Award	Wins	Nominations
Asia Artist Awards	2	2
Asian Film Awards	1	1
Baeksang Arts Awards	0	3
Blue Dragon Film Awards	2	6
Buil Film Awards	1	4
Busan Film Critics Awards	1	1
Chunsa Film Art Awards	2	6
Cine21 Film Awards	3	3
Director's Cut Awards	2	2
Golden Cinematography Awards	1	1
Grand Bell Awards	1	2
Korean Association of Film Critics Awards	2	2
KCA Culture and Entertainment Awards	1	1
Korea Culture and Entertainment Awards	1	1
Korean Film Awards	3	4
MBC Drama Awards	1	3
Marie Claire Asia Star Awards	1	1
Max Movie Awards	1	1
OBS Hot Icon Awards	2	2
Seattle International Film Festival	1	1
The Seoul Awards	1	2
Stockholm International Film Festival	1	1
Thessaloniki Film Festival	1	1
University Film Festival of Korea	1	1
Venice International Film Festival	2	2
Wildflower Film Awards	2	2
Women in Film Korea Festival	3	3

Totals (Note: Certain award groups do not simply award one winner. They acknowledge several different recipients, have runners-up, and have third place. Since this is a specific recognition and is different from losing an award, runner-up mentions are considered wins in this award tally. For simplification and to avoid errors, each award in this list has been presumed to have had a prior nomination.)
- Wins: 39
- Nominations: 58

Moon So-ri is a South Korean actress and director recognized for achievements in cinema, most notably her international breakthrough with the 2002 film Oasis, for which she received the Marcello Mastroianni Award at the Venice International Film Festival, making her the second South Korean recipient. The film also resulted in a domestic sweep for her, including Best Actress wins at the Chunsa Film Art Awards and the Korean Film Awards, as well as Best New Actress at the Blue Dragon Film Awards. Following her accolades for Oasis, she was awarded the Okgwan Order of Cultural Merit from the South Korean Government.

Moon earned further acclaim in Im Sang-soo's A Good Lawyer's Wife (2003). This film was also invited to the 60th Venice International Film Festival, and she subsequently won the Best Actress award from the Stockholm International Film Festival, followed by Best Actress honors at numerous domestic awards ceremonies, including the Grand Bell Award and the Korean Film Award for Best Actress.

Her career is further marked by more accolades, including an Asian Film Award for The Handmaiden (2016) and a subsequent Best Actress win at the Blue Dragon Film Awards for Three Sisters (2021).

In 2015, Moon made her directorial debut with the short film The Actress, which premiered at the 19th Busan International Film Festival. Two years later, she released her feature-length film, The Running Actress, which was a compilation of her earlier shorts: The Actress, The Running Actress, and The Best Director. This work earned her nominations for Best New Director Awards at the Baeksang Arts Awards and Buil Film Awards. She was also nominated as an actress for the same film in several awards.

In 2024, She was awarded the Étoile du Cinéma Award from the French Embassy in South Korea.

== Awards and nominations ==
Awards and nominations received by Moon
Award	Year	Category	Nominated work	Result	Ref.
Asia Artist Awards	2025	Best Actress of the Year – OTT (Daesang) (Note: A Daesang (Korean: 대상), which translates to "Grand Prize", is the highest honor given out at South Korean award ceremonies.)	Moon So-ri	Won	
Asia Artist Awards	2025	Best Artist – Actor	Moon So-ri	Won	
Asian Film Awards	2017	Best Supporting Actress	The Handmaiden	Won	
Baeksang Arts Awards	2003	Best Actress (Film)	Oasis	Nominated	
Baeksang Arts Awards	2018	Best New Director (Film)	The Running Actress	Nominated	
Baeksang Arts Awards	2021	Best Actress (Film)	Three Sisters	Nominated	
Blue Dragon Film Awards	2003	Best New Actress	Oasis	Won	
Blue Dragon Film Awards	2003	Best Leading Actress	Oasis	Nominated	
Blue Dragon Film Awards	2008	Best Leading Actress	Forever the Moment	Nominated	
Blue Dragon Film Awards	2017	Best Leading Actress	The Running Actress	Nominated	
Blue Dragon Film Awards	2017	Best New Director	The Running Actress	Nominated	
Blue Dragon Film Awards	2021	Best Leading Actress	Three Sisters	Won	
Buil Film Awards	2010	Best Actress	Ha Ha Ha	Won	
Buil Film Awards	2012	Best Supporting Actress	In Another Country	Nominated	
Buil Film Awards	2018	Best New Director	The Running Actress	Nominated	
Buil Film Awards	2021	Best Actress	Three Sisters	Nominated	
Busan Film Critics Awards	2003	Best Actress	A Good Lawyer's Wife	Won	
Chunsa Film Art Awards	2002	Best Actress	Oasis	Won	
Chunsa Film Art Awards	2003	Best Actress	A Good Lawyer's Wife	Won	
Chunsa Film Art Awards	2008	Best Actress	Forever the Moment	Nominated	
Chunsa Film Art Awards	2018	Best Actress	The Running Actress	Nominated	
Chunsa Film Art Awards	2019	Best Actress	Ode to the Goose	Nominated	
Chunsa Film Art Awards	2021	Best Actress	Three Sisters	Nominated	
Cine21 Film Awards	2002	Best Actress	Oasis	Won	
Cine21 Film Awards	2003	Best Actress	Oasis	Won	
Cine21 Film Awards	2021	Best Actress	Three Sisters	Won	
Director's Cut Awards	2002	Best New Actress	Oasis	Won	
Director's Cut Awards	2003	Best Actress	A Good Lawyer's Wife	Won	
Golden Cinematography Awards	2018	Popularity Award, Actress	The Running Actress	Won	
Grand Bell Awards	2004	Best Actress	A Good Lawyer's Wife	Won	
Grand Bell Awards	2017	Best Supporting Actress	The Mayor	Nominated	
Hawaii International Film Festival	2018	Halekulani Career Achievement Award	—N/a	Won	
Korean Association of Film Critics Awards	2002	Best Actress	Oasis	Won	
Korean Association of Film Critics Awards	2021	Best Actress	Three Sisters	Won	
KCA Culture and Entertainment Awards (Note: KCA (Korea Consumer Agency) hosts the KCA Culture and Entertainment Awards Ceremony every year on Consumer Day to raise awareness of consumer rights)	2025	Actress of the Year Chosen by Public	When Life Gives You Tangerines	Won	
Korea Culture Entertainment Awards	2018	Best Actress	The Running Actress	Won	
Korean Film Awards	2002	Best Actress	Oasis	Won	
Korean Film Awards	2002	Best New Actress	Oasis	Won	
Korean Film Awards	2003	Best Actress	A Good Lawyer's Wife	Won	
Korean Film Awards	2010	Best Actress	Ha Ha Ha	Nominated	
Marie Claire Asia Star Awards	2017	Special Award	The Running Actress	Won	
Max Movie Awards	2004	Best Actress	A Good Lawyer's Wife	Won	
MBC Drama Awards	2008	Excellence Award, Actress	All About My Family	Won	
MBC Drama Awards	2021	Top Excellence Award, Actress in a Miniseries	On the Verge of Insanity	Nominated	
MBC Drama Awards	2021	Best Couple Award with Jung Jae-young	On the Verge of Insanity	Nominated	
OBS Hot Icon Awards (Note: OBS Hot Icon Awards is an entertainment popularity award given by OBS Gyeongin TV since 2013.)	2017	OBS 2017 Hot Icon Trend	Moon So-ri	Won	
OBS Hot Icon Awards	2021	OBS 2017 Hot Icon Trend	Moon So-ri	Won	
Seattle International Film Festival	2003	Best Actress	Oasis	Won	
The Seoul Awards	2017	Best Actress (Film)	The Running Actress	Nominated	
The Seoul Awards	2018	Best Supporting Actress (TV)	Life	Won	
Stockholm International Film Festival	2003	Best Actress	A Good Lawyer's Wife	Won	
Thessaloniki Film Festival	2006	Best Actress	Family Ties	Won	
University Film Festival of Korea	2004	Best Actress	A Good Lawyer's Wife	Won	
Venice International Film Festival	2002	Marcello Mastroianni Award	Oasis	Won	
Venice International Film Festival	2016	Starlight Cinema Award	—N/a	Won	
Wildflower Film Awards	2015	Best Actress	Hill of Freedom	Nominated	
Wildflower Film Awards	2018	Best Director	The Running Actress	Nominated	
Women in Film Korea Festival	2002	Best Actress	Oasis	Won	
Women in Film Korea Festival	2003	Best Actress	A Good Lawyer's Wife	Won	
Women in Film Korea Festival	2021	Best Actress	Three Sisters	Won	

== Other accolades ==
=== State honors ===
Name of country, year given, and name of honor
Country	Award Ceremony	Year	Honor	Ref.
France	Busan International Film Festival French Night (Note: Annual event held by French Embassy in South Korea.)	2024	The Étoile du Cinéma Award	
South Korea	Korean Culture and Arts Awards (Note: Since 1973, honors are given at Cultural Day (문화의 날), 3rd Saturday in October by the Ministry of Culture, Sports and Tourism)	2002	Okgwan Order of Culture Merit	

=== Listicles ===
Name of publisher, year listed, name of listicle, and placement
Publisher	Year	Listicle	Placement	Ref.
Korean Film Council	2021	Korean Actors 200 (Note: Introduces 200 actors that best represent the present and future of Korean cinema to the people in the film industry all over the world.)	Included	
