= Busan Film Critics Awards =

South Korean annual film awards

- Hangul: 부산 영화 평론가 협회상
- Hanja: 釜山 映畫 評論家 協會賞
- RR: Busan yeonghwa pyeongnonga hyeophoesang
- MR: Pusan yŏnghwa p'yŏngnon'ga hyŏphoesang
- Awarded for: Excellence in cinematic achievements
- Country: South Korea
- Presented by: Busan Film Critics Association
- First award: 2000
- Final award: 2021
- Website: http://www.bfca.or.kr/

Established in 2000, the Busan Film Critics Awards (Korean: 부산 영화 평론가 협회상) is run by the Busan Film Critics Association (BCFA), a small but independent-minded group of critics based in Busan, South Korea. Each year they announce their choices shortly before the opening of the Busan International Film Festival (BIFF), and a ceremony is then held at the festival to present the prizes. Their choices are not swayed by popular opinion, but represent a thoughtful and serious attempt to judge the greatest achievements of each year.

== Best Film ==
#	Year	Film	Director
1	2000	Virgin Stripped Bare by Her Bachelors	Hong Sang-soo
2	2001	One Fine Spring Day	Hur Jin-ho
3	2002	Sympathy for Mr. Vengeance	Park Chan-wook
4	2003	Save the Green Planet!	Jang Joon-hwan
5	2004	Oldboy	Park Chan-wook
6	2005	Rules of Dating	Han Jae-rim
7	2006	Family Ties	Kim Tae-yong
8	2007	—N/a	—N/a
9	2008	Night and Day	Hong Sang-soo
10	2009	Mother	Bong Joon-ho
11	2010	Oki's Movie	Hong Sang-soo
12	2011	Late Autumn	Kim Tae-yong
13	2012	Nameless Gangster: Rules of the Time	Yoon Jong-bin
14	2013	Jiseul	O Muel
15	2014	Gyeongju	Zhang Lu
16	2015	Right Now, Wrong Then	Hong Sang-soo
17	2016	The Truth Beneath	Lee Kyoung-mi
18	2017	On the Beach at Night Alone, The Day After	Hong Sang-soo
19	2018	The Remnants	Kim Il-ran, Lee Hyuk-sang
20	2019	Hotel by the River	Hong Sang-soo
21	2020	Tiny Light	Cho Min-jae
22	2021	Voice of Silence	Hong Eui-jeong
23	2022	In Front of Your Face	Hong Sang-soo
24	2023	A Lonely Island in the Distant Sea	Kim Mi-young

== Best Director ==
#	Year	Director	Film
1	2000	Bae Chang-ho	My Heart
2	2001	Hur Jin-ho	One Fine Spring Day
3	2002	Park Chan-wook	Sympathy for Mr. Vengeance
4	2003	Bong Joon-ho	Memories of Murder
5	2004	Park Chan-wook	Oldboy
6	2005	Ryoo Seung-wan	Crying Fist
7	2006	Kim Tae-yong	Family Ties
8	2007	Im Sang-soo	The Old Garden
9	2008	Lee Myung-se	M
10	2009	Yang Ik-june	Breathless

== Best Actor ==
#	Year	Actor	Film
1	2000	Lee Byung-hun & Song Kang-ho	Joint Security Area
2	2001	Choi Min-sik	Failan
3	2002	Sul Kyung-gu	Oasis
4	2003	Shin Ha-kyun	Save the Green Planet!
5	2004	Jung Jae-young	Someone Special
6	2005	Cho Seung-woo	Marathon
7	2006	Hwang Jung-min	Bloody Tie
8	2007	Song Kang-ho	The Show Must Go On
9	2008	Kim Yoon-seok	The Chaser
10	2009	Ha Jung-woo	My Dear Enemy
11	2010	Yoon Je-moon	The Man Next Door
12	2011	Yoo Jun-sang	The Day He Arrives
13	2012	Lee Byung-hun	Masquerade
14	2013	Ha Jung-woo	The Terror Live
15	2014	Lee Geung-young	The Pirates
16	2015	Yoo Hae-jin	Veteran
17	2016	Jung Woo-sung	Asura: The City of Madness
18	2017	Kwon Hae-hyo	The Day After
19	2018	Park Jung-min	Sunset in My Hometown
20	2019	Gi Ju-bong	Hotel by the River
21	2020	Cho Jin-woong	Me and Me
22	2021	Byun Yo-han	The Book of Fish
23	2022	Park Hae-il	Decision to Leave
24	2023	Park Jong-hwan	A Lonely Island in the Distant Sea
25	2024	Choi Min-sik	Exhuma
26	2025	Ha Seong-guk	What Does That Nature Say to You

== Best Actress ==
#	Year	Actress	Film
1	2000	Jeon Do-yeon	Happy End
2	2001	Lee Young-ae	One Fine Spring Day
3	2002	Bae Doona	Take Care of My Cat
4	2003	Moon So-ri	A Good Lawyer's Wife
5	2004	Kang Hye-jung	Oldboy
6	2005	Kang Hye-jung	Rules of Dating
7	2006	Uhm Jung-hwa	Princess Aurora
8	2007	Ye Ji-won	Old Miss Diary - Movie
9	2008	Kim Min-hee	Hellcats
10	2009	Kim Hye-ja	Mother
11	2010	Youn Yuh-jung	The Housemaid, Ha Ha Ha, Actresses
12	2011	Tang Wei	Late Autumn
13	2012	Hwang Jung-min	Jesus Hospital
14	2013	Jung Yu-mi	Our Sunhi
15	2014	—N/a	—N/a
16	2015	Kim Min-hee	Right Now, Wrong Then
17	2016	Son Ye-jin	The Truth Beneath
18	2017	Han Ye-ri	A Quiet Dream
19	2018	Esom	Microhabitat
20	2019	Lee Jung-eun	Parasite
21	2020	Kang Mal-geum	Lucky Chan-sil
22	2021	Kim Sun-young	Three Sisters
23	2022	Lee Hye-young	In Front of Your Face
24	2023	Go Min-si	Smugglers
25	2024	Jeon Do-yeon	Revolver
26	2025	Han Ye-ri	Spring Night

== Best Supporting Actor ==
#	Year	Actor	Film
1	2000	Yoo Oh-sung	Attack the Gas Station
2	2001	Jo Jae-hyun	Address Unknown
3	2002	Gong Hyung-jin	A Perfect Match
4	2003	Kim Kap-soo	Mutt Boy
5	2004	Baek Yoon-sik	The Big Swindle
6	2005	Oh Dal-su	Mapado
7	2006	Kim Tae-woo	Woman on the Beach
8	2007	Kim Yoon-seok	Tazza: The High Rollers
9	2008	Park Hee-soon	Seven Days
10	2009	Shin Jung-geun	Running Turtle

== Best Supporting Actress ==
#	Year	Actress	Film
1	2000	Kim Ho-jung	Barking Dogs Never Bite
2	2001	Oh Ji-hye	Waikiki Brothers
3	2002	Kim Yeo-jin	Chihwaseon
4	2003	Youn Yuh-jung	A Good Lawyer's Wife
5	2004	Go Doo-shim	My Mother, the Mermaid
6	2005	Na Moon-hee	You Are My Sunshine
7	2006	Choo Ja-hyun	Bloody Tie
8	2007	Moon Hee-kyung	Shim's Family
9	2008	Kim Ji-young	Forever the Moment

== Best New Director ==
#	Year	Director	Film
1	2000	Byun Hyuk	Interview
2	2001	Yoon Jong-chan	Sorum
3	2002	Kim In-sik	Road Movie
4	2003	Jang Joon-hwan	Save the Green Planet!
5	2004	Choi Dong-hoon	The Big Swindle
6	2005	Han Jae-rim	Rules of Dating
7	2006	Lee Hae-young, Lee Hae-jun	Like a Virgin
8	2007	Jung Sik & Jung Beom-sik	Epitaph
9	2008	Oh Joum-kyun	Viva! Love
10	2009	Lee Yong-ju	Possessed
11	2010	—N/a	—N/a
12	2011	Yoon Sung-hyun	Bleak Night
13	2012	Shin A-ga & Lee Sang-cheol	Jesus Hospital
14	2013	Kim Byung-woo	The Terror Live
15	2014	Jung Young-heon	Lebanon Emotion
15	2014	Shim Sung-bo	Haemoo
16	2015	Kim Sung-je	Minority Opinion
16	2015	Hong Won-chan	Office
17	2016	Lee Yo-sup	The Queen of Crime
18	2017	Lee Dong-woo	No Money, No Future
19	2018	Lim Dae-hyung	Merry Christmas Mr. Mo
20	2019	Kang Sang-woo	Kim-Gun
20	2019	Lee Sang-geun	Exit
21	2020	Jung Jin-young	Me and Me
21	2020	Yoon Dan-bi	Moving On
22	2021	Kwon Min-pyo, Han-Sol Seo	Short Vacation
23	2022	Lee Ran-hee	A Leave
23	2022	Kim Ji-seok	And There was Light
24	2023	Park Song-Yeol	Hot in Day, Cold at Night
25	2024	Lee Jeong-hong	A Wild Roomer
26	2025	Lee Jong-su	Heritage

== Best New Actor ==
#	Year	Actor	Film
1	2000	Yoo Ji-tae	Ditto
2	2001	Kim Myung-min	Sorum
3	2002	Hwang Jung-min	Road Movie
4	2003	Park Hae-il	Jealousy is My Middle Name
5	2004	Kang Dong-won	Temptation of Wolves
6	2005	Chun Jung-myung & Kim Kang-woo	The Aggressives
7	2006	Ryu Deok-hwan	Like a Virgin
8	2007	Yoo Ah-in	Boys of Tomorrow
9	2008	—N/a	—N/a
10	2009	So Ji-sub & Kang Ji-hwan	Rough Cut
11	2010	—N/a	—N/a
12	2011	—N/a	—N/a
13	2012	Kim Sung-kyun	The Neighbor
14	2013	Ensemble cast	Jiseul
15	2014	Park Yoochun	Haemoo
16	2015	Choi Woo-shik	Set Me Free
17	2016	—N/a	—N/a
18	2017	Koo Kyo-hwan	Jane
19	2018	Sung Yu-bin	Last Child
20	2019	—N/a	—N/a
21	2020	Kwak Jin-moo	Tiny Light
22	2021	Kim Jun-hyung	The Education
23	2022	Kim Dong-hwi	In Our Prime
24	2023	Kwon Da-ham	Through My Midwinter

== Best New Actress ==
#	Year	Actress	Film
1	2000	Ha Ji-won	Truth Game
2	2001	Jang Jin-young	Sorum
3	2002	Kim Hye-na	Flower Island
4	2003	Im Soo-jung	A Tale of Two Sisters
5	2004	Kwak Ji-min	Samaritan Girl
6	2005	Kim Ji-soo	This Charming Girl
7	2006	Go Hyun-jung	Woman on the Beach
8	2007	Hwang Bo-ra	Skeletons in the Closet
9	2008	Park Eun-hye	Night and Day
10	2009	Kim Do-young	The Day After
11	2010	—N/a	—N/a
12	2011	—N/a	—N/a
13	2012	Kim Go-eun	Eungyo
14	2013	Jung Eun-chae	Nobody's Daughter Haewon
15	2014	Ryu Hye-young	INGtoogi: The Battle of Internet Trolls
16	2015	Park So-dam	The Silenced
17	2016	Kim Tae-ri	The Handmaiden
18	2017	Choi Hee-seo	Anarchist from Colony
19	2018	Jeon Yeo-been	After My Death
20	2019	Kang Jin-ah	To My River
20	2019	Cho Min-kyeong	February
21	2020	Kim So-hye	Moonlit Winter
21	2020	Choi Jeong-woon	Moving On
22	2021	Bang Min-ah	Snowball
23	2022	Ha Yoon-kyung	Gyeong-ah’s Daughter
24	2023	Kim Si-eun	Next Sohee

== Best Screenplay ==
#	Year	Screenwriter	Film
1	2000	Hong Sang-soo	Virgin Stripped Bare by Her Bachelors
2	2001	Song Min-ho	Ray Bang
3	2002	Lee Chang-dong	Oasis
4	2003	Bong Joon-ho & Shim Sung-bo	Memories of Murder
5	2004	Jang Jin	Someone Special
6	2005	Go Yoon-hee	Rules of Dating
7	2006	Son Jae-gon	My Scary Girl
8	2007	Choi Dong-hoon	Tazza: The High Rollers
9	2008	Na Hong-jin	The Chaser
10	2009	Lee Hae-joon	Castaway on the Moon
11	2010	Kim Dae-woo	The Servant
12	2011	—N/a	—N/a
13	2012	Lee Kwang-kuk	Romance Joe
14	2013	Bong Joon-ho & Kelly Masterson	Snowpiercer
15	2014	Kim Seong-hun	A Hard Day
16	2015	Jang Kun-jae	A Midsummer's Fantasia
17	2016	Shin Yeon-shick	Dongju: The Portrait of a Poet
18	2017	Kim Yang-hee	The Poet and the Boy
19	2018	Shin Dong-seok	Last Child
20	2019	—N/a	—N/a
21	2020	Ha Yoon-jae	Nailed
22	2021	Hong Eui-jeong	Voice of Silence
24	2023	Lee Ji-eun	The Hill of Secrets

== Best Cinematography ==
#	Year	Cinematographer	Film
1	2000	—N/a	—N/a
2	2001	Kim Hyung-gu	Musa
3	2002	Jung Il-sung	Chihwaseon
4	2003	Lee Mo-gae	A Tale of Two Sisters
5	2004	Chung Chung-hoon	Oldboy
6	2005	Kim Ji-yong	A Bittersweet Life
7	2006	Kim Young-chul	The City of Violence
8	2007	Kim Woo-hyung	The Old Garden
9	2008	Hong Kyung-pyo	M
10	2009	Hong Kyung-pyo	Mother
11	2010	Kim Woo-hyung	Paju

== Technical Award ==
#	Year	Recipient	Film
12	2011	Ryu Seong-hee	The Front Line
13	2012	—N/a	—N/a
14	2013	Jung Doo-hong	The Berlin File
15	2014	Cho Young-jik	Gyeongju
16	2015	Kelvin Kyung Kun Park	A Dream of Iron
17	2016	Lee Mo-gae	Asura: The City of Madness
18	2017	Kwon Kwi-deok, Park Jung-hoon	The Villainess
19	2018	Hong Kyung-pyo	Burning
20	2019	Kang Gook-hyeon	House of Hummingbird
21	2020	—N/a	—N/a
22	2021	Lee Jae-seong	The Book of Fish
23	2022	Park Il-hyun	Hunt
24	2023	Park Jae-beom	Mother Land

== Special Jury Prize ==
#	Year	Recipient	Film
1	2000	Ryoo Seung-wan	Die Bad
2	2001	—N/a	—N/a
3	2002	Lee Jeong-hyang	The Way Home
4	2003	Kim Jee-woon	A Tale of Two Sisters
5	2004	Kim Dong-won	Repatriation
6	2005	Noh Dong-seok	My Generation
7	2006	Bong Joon-ho	The Host
8	2007	Im Yoo-cheol	Bi-sang
9	2008	Yim Soon-rye	Forever the Moment
10	2009	Jung Ji-woo	Modern Boy
11	2010	Hong Hyung-sook	The Border City 2
12	2011	Jeon Kyu-hwan	Animal Town
13	2012	Jeong Jae-eun	Talking Architect
14	2013	Hong Sang-soo	Our Sunhi
15	2014	Cho Se-rae	The Stone
16	2015	Oh Seung-uk	The Shameless
17	2016	Jung Ji-woo	Fourth Place
17	2016	Kim Jeonggeun	The Island of Shadows
18	2017	Zhang Lu	A Quiet Dream
18	2017	Kim Soo-hyun	Beaten Black and Blue
19	2018	Hwang Dong-hyuk	The Fortress
20	2019	Lee Kang-hyun	Possible Faces
21	2020	Kim Mi-re	East Asia Anti-Japan Armed Front
23	2022	Lee Il-ha	I Am More
24	2023	Hong Sang-soo	Walk Up

== Award for Artistic Contribution ==
#	Year	Recipient	Career
1st	2000	—N/a	—N/a
2nd	2001	—N/a	—N/a
3rd	2002	—N/a	—N/a
4th	2003	Yu Hyun-mok	
5th	2004	—N/a	—N/a
6th	2005	—N/a	—N/a
7th	2006	—N/a	—N/a
8th	2007	Byun In-sik	
9th	2008	—N/a	—N/a
10th	2009	Joo Yoon-tak	
11th	2010	—N/a	—N/a
12th	2011	—N/a	—N/a
13th	2012	—N/a	—N/a
14th	2013	—N/a	—N/a
15th	2014	—N/a	—N/a

== Lee Pil-woo Award ==
#	Year	Recipient	Career
1st	2000	Jung Il-sung	Cinematographer: Insect Woman (1972), Mandala (1981), Seopyeonje (1993)
2nd	2001	Kim Dong-ho	Lighting director: The Lovers of Woomook-baemi (1990), Christmas in August (1998), Chihwaseon (2002)
3rd	2002	Kim Hyun	Editor: Whale Hunting (1984), Chilsu and Mansu (1988), Road to the Racetrack (1991), Oasis (2002)
4th	2003	Lee Sung-choon	Cinematographer: Five Marines (1961), Rain Shower (1978), Mulleya Mulleya (1983)
5th	2004	Lee Kyung-soon	Sound designer: Chunhyang-jeon (1955), Obaltan (1961), The Houseguest and My Mother (1961)
6th	2005	Lee Hye-yun	Costume designer: Ae-ran (1987)
7th	2006	Cho Young-sam	
8th	2007	Baek Young-ho	Stills photographer
9th	2008	Ra Sang-won	
10th	2009	Kim Tae-woo	
11th	2010	Ahn Chang-bok	
12th	2011	—N/a	—N/a
13th	2012	Oh Sang-man	
14th	2013	Son Hyo-chan	
15th	2014	Hong Dong-eun	
16th	2015	Lee Seok-ki	

== See also ==
- Cinema of Korea
- List of movie awards
