= Yoo Jun-sang =

South Korean actor

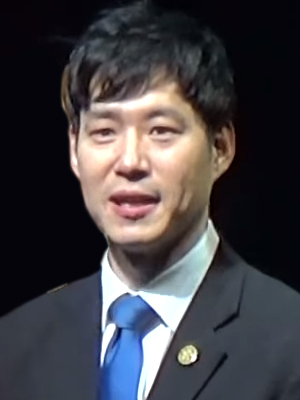
- Yoo in January 2015
- Born: November 28, 1969 (age 56); Seongdong District, Seoul, South Korea
- Education: Dongguk University
- Occupations: Actor; singer
- Years active: 1995–present
- Agent: Namoo Actors
- Spouse: Hong Eun-hee (m. 2003)
- Children: 2

Korean name
- Hangul: 유준상
- Hanja: 劉俊相
- RR: Yu Junsang
- MR: Yu Chunsang

Yoo Jun-sang (Korean: 유준상; born November 28, 1969) is a South Korean actor and singer. Yoo is best known for starring in the Hong Sang-soo films Ha Ha Ha (2010), The Day He Arrives (2011), and In Another Country (2012). He was also praised for his supporting roles in Wide Awake (2007) and Moss (2010), and gained newfound popularity in 2012 because of the TV drama My Husband Got a Family. Aside from film and television, Yoo is also active in musical theatre, notably in The Three Musketeers, Jack the Ripper, and The Days. He is also one of the main characters in two seasons of The Uncanny Counter.

== Career ==
Yoo Jun-sang graduated from Dongguk University with a bachelor's degree in Theater and Film and a master's degree in Theater Arts. Having kicked off his career in 1995 through SBS's open auditions, Yoo built a stable acting career through films and TV series. He also stars in stage musicals, notably Claws of Angel, The Three Musketeers, Jack the Ripper, Rebecca, Kim Kwang-seok jukebox musical The Days, and Frankenstein. Additionally, Yoo has been a full-time faculty member at the Korea Arts Institute since 2010.

He gave a memorable supporting turn as a cynical prosecutor in 2010's Moss, the blockbuster mystery film based on a popular online comic series. His performance garnered him Best Supporting Actor wins at the Buil Film Awards and Chunsa Film Art Awards. He also won Best Supporting Actor at the Grand Bell Awards for the 2007 medical thriller Wide Awake.

But Yoo is best known as a regular in the films of auteur Hong Sang-soo. He headlined The Day He Arrives in 2011, which netted him the Best Actor prize at the Busan Film Critics Awards. He also starred in Ha Ha Ha, which won the top prize in the Un Certain Regard section of the 2010 Cannes Film Festival, at which Yoo and his fellow cast members walked the red carpet. When asked to describe the actor, Hong said that "Yoo is... a kind person." [...] I just... like him. I like him a lot. He is someone with a drive that doesn't irritate me. His honesty doesn't irritate me either and I like his energy. His energy has a clean color. And I think he's a lot of help when we work together." The director cast him opposite renowned French actress Isabelle Huppert in Hong's first English-language film In Another Country. He described Huppert as "a real joy" to work with, while she praised him as "kind and charismatic." Yoo was singled out in The Hollywood Reporter review as the film's scene-stealer.

After a five-year absence from television, he returned in the series My Husband Got a Family (also known as Unexpected You) co-starring Kim Nam-joo. The drama was a big hit, it not only consistently topped its timeslot throughout its long run, but ranked number one on the 2012 yearly TV ratings chart. As a result, Yoo enjoyed his biggest surge of mainstream popularity since his debut, landing commercial contracts and gaining the nickname "Nation's son-in-law".

In 2012, he published his memoir titled The Invention of Happiness. Yoo said he began writing diaries back in university when his professor recommended that he try filling up at least one journal each year with personal reflections. The book contained highlights from his 20 years of journaling life—from his days as a college student, moments on the set of several productions to his travels and vacations—as well as poems and sketches made by the actor in his everyday life. He donated all of the proceeds from the book to charity, especially to impoverished children.

For the aerial action blockbuster R2B: Return to Base, Yoo along with the rest of the cast had to undergo months-long physical training for their role as jet fighter pilots. The actors also had to pass mandatory tests for actual pilots to be able to get into the cockpit—in a low-pressure chamber, emergency escape routine, simulated flight as well as training to develop tolerance for acceleration. Yoo reportedly passed out twice before he passed his 6G test, only passing on his third attempt.

Yoo underwent knee surgery after an injury to his cruciate ligament while filming Fists of Legend. The action movie revolved around a group of middle-aged men who fight on a reality show for a cash prize. On December 19, 2013, he released his first album, titled Junes; besides singing, Yoo composed, wrote the lyrics and produced all the seven songs included. Yoo's second album, J N Joy 20: Travel Project One, Just Travel... Walking... and Thinking..., was a collaboration with guitarist Lee Jun-hwa and released on November 13, 2014, followed by his first concert.

== Personal life ==
Besides acting, singing and writing, Yoo can also play several musical instruments including guitar, saxophone, violin and the piano. Furthermore, he showcased 20 pieces of his artwork at the Art Asia fair in December 2012.

He married actress Hong Eun-hee in 2003, and they have two sons named Yoo Dong-woo and Yoo Min-jae. Dong-woo appeared in the 2011 short film Modern Family.

On the talk show Healing Camp, he spoke about his love for his widowed mother, who suffered a cerebral hemorrhagic stroke in 2011.

== Filmography ==
=== Film ===
Year	Title	Role	Notes/Ref.
1999	Tell Me Something	Kim Gi-yeon	
2000	Nightmare	Jung-wook	
2001	Go Back, Red Peter's Confession		
2003	Show Show Show	San-hae	
2005	Wedding Campaign	Hee-chul	
2007	Wide Awake	Kang Wook-han	
2009	Like You Know It All	Mr. Go	
2009	Where is Ronny...	In-ho	
2010	Ha Ha Ha	Bang Joong-sik	
2010	Moss	Prosecutor Park Min-wook	
2011	The Last Blossom	Kim Geun-deok	
2011	List		short film
2011	The Day He Arrives	Seong-jun	
2012	In Another Country	Lifeguard	
2012	R2B: Return to Base	Lee Cheol-hee	
2012	Touch	Park Dong-sik	
2012	Adventures in Zambezia	Tendai the Peregrine Falcon	(voice, Korean dubbed)
2013	Nobody's Daughter Haewon	Joong-sik	
2013	Fists of Legend	Lee Sang-hoon	
2014	The Target	Song Gi-cheol	
2015	A Matter of Interpretation	Detective	
2015	Angry Painter	Painter	
2015	Right Now, Wrong Then	Ahn Seong-gook	
2015	The Map Against The World	Heungseon Daewongun	
2017	Along with the Gods: The Two Worlds	Dead firefighter	
2019	Hotel by the River	Byung Soo	
2022	Honest Candidate 2	President of the Republic of Korea	Special appearance
2022	The Boys	Choi Woo-seong	Premiere at BIFF
2025	My Favorite Love Story	James	Special appearance

=== Television series ===
Year	Title	Role	Notes/Ref.
1994	Kka-chi-ne		
1995	Agatha Christie		
1996	Expedition of Men		
1996	MBC Best Theater: "Man Opening the Refrigerator Door"	Jae-min	
1996	When the Salmon Returns	Han Jae-joon	
1997	Wedding Dress		
1997	MBC Best Theater: "Tricycle"	Min-soo	
1997	MBC Best Theater: "Until You Fall Asleep"	Man	
1998	Hope Inn		
1998	Sunday Best: "April Concerto"	Joon-ho	
1998	I Love You, I'm Sorry		
1998	Stranger	Beom-soo	
1998	White Nights 3.98	Kim Jin-seok	
1999	Young Sun	Yoon Je-hyuk	
1999	We Saw a Lost Little Bird		
1999	Sunday Best: "A Thirty-one-year-old's First Kiss"		
1999	Cello	Park Ki-tae	
1999	The Last War	Kim Tae-joong	
1999	Goodbye My Love	Song Dae-ho	
1999	Magic Castle	Lee Poong-jin	
2000	Butcher's Daughter		
2000	The Full Sun	Kang Min-ki	
2001	How Should I Be?	Na Ki-chan	
2001	Life Is Beautiful	Nam Jung-woo	
2001	Fox and Cotton Candy	Bong Kang-chul	
2002	Affection	Jo Byung-soo	
2002	Inspector Park Mun-su	Park Mun-su	
2004	The Woman Who Wants to Marry	Shin Joo-ho	
2005	Toji, the Land	Kim Gil-sang	
2005	Young-jae's Golden Days	Eom Joong-seo	
2007	Catching Up with Gangnam Moms	Seo Sang-won	
2012	My Husband Got a Family	Bang Gwi-nam/Terry Kang	
2013	The Secret of Birth	Hong Gyung-doo	
2013	My Love from the Star	Section chief Yoo	Cameo (Eps. 2–3)
2015	Heard It Through the Grapevine	Han Jeong-ho	
2016	Working Mom Parenting Daddy	Lee Moon-han	Cameo
2016	Pied Piper	Yoon Hee-Sung	
2017	Distorted	Lee Seok-min	
2019	Liver or Die	Lee Poong-sang	
2020	Graceful Friends	Ahn Goong-chul	
2020	The Uncanny Counter	Ga Mo-tak	Season 1–2
2021	The Penthouse: War in Life	Jung Doo-man	Cameo, Season 2
2022	Alchemy of Souls	Park Jin	
2025	We Will Replace the Trip	Oh Sang-sik	

=== Music video appearances ===
Year	Title	Artist
2003	"Can't I?"	Wheesung
2007	"Oh, You Beautiful Woman"	Yoo Jun-sang

== Stage ==
=== Concerts ===
Concert performances
Year	Title		Role	Theater	Date	Ref.
Year	English	Korean	Role	Theater	Date	Ref.
2011	Lee Young-mi concert	이영미 콘서트	Singer	Rolling hole	May 6, 2011	

=== Musical ===
Year	Title		Role	Theater	Date	Ref.
Year	English	Korean	Role	Theater	Date	Ref.
1995	Foes of Women					
1998	Grease					
2001	The Play					
2001	Love & Luve					
2004	Two Men					
2005	Passion of the Rain					
2007	Claws of Angel		Il-du/Idu			
2008	The Life		Sonja			
2008–2009	The Happy Life		Beom-jin			
2009	The Three Musketeers	삼총사	D'Artagnan	Chungmu Art Hall Grand Theatre	May 12 – June 21	
2009–2010	Jack the Ripper	살인마 잭	Anderson	Universal Art Center	November 13, 2009 – January 31, 2010	
2009–2010	Jack the Ripper	살인마 잭	Anderson	Yeungnam University Cheonma Art Center Grand Hall, Daegu	December 24–26, 2009	
2013	Rebecca	레베카	Maxim DeWinter	LG Arts Center	January 12 – March 31	
2013	Those Days	그날들	Cha Jeong-hak	Daehakro Musical Center Main Theater	April 4 – June 30	
2013	Rebecca	레베카	Maxim De Winter	Daegu Gyeongnam Art Center	April 9–13	
2013	Rebecca	레베카	Maxim De Winter	Gimhae Cultural Center Maru Hall	April 19–21	
2013	Rebecca	레베카	Maxim De Winter	Busan Cultural Center Grand Theater	May 11–12	
2013	Rebecca	레베카	Maxim De Winter	Cheonan Arts Center Main Theater	May 25–26	
2013	Rebecca	레베카	Maxim De Winter	Goyang Aram Nuri Arts Center Aram Theater	June 1–2	
2013	The Days	그날들	Cha Jeong-hak	Daejeon Arts Center Art Hall	July 5–7	
2013	The Days	그날들	Cha Jeong-hak	Daegu Gyeongnam Art Center	July 19–21	
2013	The Days	그날들	Cha Jeong-hak	Gyeonggi Arts Center Main Theater	August 2–4	
2013	The Days	그날들	Cha Jeong-hak	Centum City Sohyang Theater Shinhan Card Hall	August 15–18	
2013	The Days	그날들	Cha Jeong-hak	Ansan Culture & Arts Center Haedoji Theater	August 23–25	
2014	Frankenstein		Victor Frankenstein	2015		
2014–2015	The Days	그날들	Cha Jun-hak	Daehangno Musical Center Grand Theater	Oct 21, 2014 – Jan 18, 2015	
2015	The Days	그날들	Cha Jun-hak	Seongnam Art Center Opera House	March 21–22	
2015	The Days	그날들	Cha Jun-hak	Incheon Culture and Arts Center Grand Performance Hall	Feb 7–8	
2015	The Days	그날들	Cha Jun-hak	Daegu Keimyung Art Center	April 4–5	
2015	The Days	그날들	Cha Jun-hak	Jeju Art Center	May 30–31	
2015	Robin Hood		Robin Hood			
2015	Robin Hood	로빈훗	Robin Hood	D Cube Link Art Center	January 23 – March 29	
2015	Robin Hood	로빈훗	Robin Hood	Seongnam Art Centre Opera House	April 19 – May 25	
2016	The Days	그날들	Cha Jun-hak	Chungmu Art Center Grand Theater	Aug 25 – Nov 3	
2016	The Days	그날들	Cha Jun-hak	Daegu Keimyung Art Center	Nov 12–13	
2016	The Days	그날들	Cha Jun-hak	Centum City Sohyang Theater Shinhan Card Hall Busan	Dec 2–4	
2016	The Days	그날들	Cha Jun-hak	Gyeonggi Arts Center Grand Theater Suwon	Dec 10–11	
2016	The Days	그날들	Cha Jun-hak	Guri Art Hall Cosmos Grand Theater	Dec 16–17	
2016	The Days	그날들	Cha Jun-hak	GS Caltex Yeulmaru Grand Theater Yeosu	Dec 23–25	
2017	The Days	그날들	Cha Jun-hak	Seongnam Art Center Opera House	Jan 21–22	
2017	The Days	그날들	Cha Jun-hak	Seoul Arts Center Opera Theater	Feb 7 – March 5	
2017	Ben Hur		Judah Ben Hur			
2018	Barnum		P.T. Barnum			
2018–2019	Those Days	그날들	Cha Jun-hak	Centum City Sohyang Theater Shinhan Card Hall Busan	Dec 23–30	
2018–2019	Those Days	그날들	Cha Jun-hak	Daejeon Arts Center Art Hall	Jan 5–6	
2018–2019	Those Days	그날들	Cha Jun-hak	Blue Square Shinhan Card Hall Busan	Feb 22 – May 6	
2018–2019	Those Days	그날들	Cha Jun-hak	Gyeongsangnam-do Culture and Arts Center Grand Performance Hall Guri	June 7–8	
2021	Beetlejuice		Beetlejuice			
2023	Those Days	그날들	Cha Jun-hak	Seoul Arts Center	July 12 – September 3	

=== Theater ===
Theater play performances of Oh
Year	Title		Role	Venue	Date	Ref.
Year	English	Korean	Role	Venue	Date	Ref.
2018	Doosan Humanities Theater 2018 Altruism - Nassim	두산인문극장 2018 이타주의자 - 낫심		Doosan Art Center Space111	April 10–29	

== Discography ==
Album information	Track listing
Oh, You Beautiful Woman: 1 track from Lee Eun-ju: Only One; Released: February 16, 2007; Label: Mnet Media, CJ Music	Track listing: 7. 오, 그대는 아름다운 여인 (Oh, You Beautiful Woman) – Yoo Jun-sang
Don't Turn Off the Lights: 1 track from Love Tree Project: Namoo Actors Charity Project; Released: January 8, 2010; Label: Ode Music, KT Music	Track listing: 8. 꺼지지 않는 불빛 (Don't Turn Off the Lights) – Yoo Jun-sang
Gray City / I Hate This City: 2 tracks from Jack the Ripper cast recording; Released: August 9, 2010; Label: M Musical Company, Windmill Media, Mirrorball Music	Track listing: 11. 회색도시 (Gray City) – Ensemble, Yoo Jun-sang; 22. 이 도시가 싫어 (I Hate This City) – Ensemble, Yoo Jun-sang
Ce Song: 1 track from My Husband Got a Family OST; Released: August 17, 2012; Label: The Groove Entertainment, LOEN Entertainment	Track listing: 2. Ce Song – Yoo Jun-sang (feat. Kwak Dong-yeon and Kim Sang-ho)
Junes: Album; Artist: Yoo Jun-sang; Released: December 20, 2013; Label: CJ Music	Track listing: 1. 27과 33 그 해 여름 사이; 2. 사랑이 필요해; 3. 아름다운 아름다운; 4. Making Room; 5. 그대에게 다가가는 순간 (feat. Lee Da-yeon of Taurine); 6. In Tokyo; 7. 27과 33 여름 사이
Travel Project One: Just Travel... Walking... And Thinking...: Album; Artist: J N Joy 20 (Yoo Jun-sang, Lee Joon-wha); Released: November 17, 2014; Label: Mirrorball Music	Track listing: 1. 기타 치기 좋은 오후; 2. 나의 본적을 찾아서; 3. Now(nä); 4. 기차 너머 보이는 저 풍경 위를 따라가다 보면; 5. The Path You've Been; 6. 이제 울지 마 7. 어떤 사람이 될까?; 8. I'll Call The Name; 9. 너에게 못다 한 이야기; 10. 공연할 때 눈물을 너무 많이 흘려서 앞으로 눈물이 안 나오면 어쩌나 걱정하는 어느 연기자의 고백

== Bibliography ==
Year	Title	Publisher	ISBN
2012	The Invention of Happiness	Yolimwon	ISBN 9788970637426

== Ambassadorship ==
- Public Relations Ambassador for the Park Kyung-ri Literature Awards (2022)

== Accolades ==
=== Awards and nominations ===
Year	Award	Category	Nominated work	Result
2001	MBC Drama Awards	Excellence Award, Actor	How Should I Be?	Won
2001	MBC Drama Awards	Popularity Award	How Should I Be?	Won
2002	8th Korea Musical Awards	Best Actor	The Play	Won
2002	MBC Drama Awards	Popularity Award	Fox and Cotton Candy	Won
2005	SBS Drama Awards	Excellence Award, Actor in a Serial Drama	Land	Won
2006	40th Taxpayer's Day	Prime Minister's Commendation	—N/a	Won
2007	SBS Drama Awards	Excellence Award, Actor in a Miniseries	Catching Up with Gangnam Moms	Won
2008	45th Grand Bell Awards	Best Supporting Actor	Wide Awake	Won
2009	3rd Daegu International Musical Festival	Popular Star Award		Won
2010	18th Chunsa Film Art Awards	Best Supporting Actor	Moss	Won
2010	19th Buil Film Awards	Best Supporting Actor	Ha Ha Ha	Won
2010	31st Blue Dragon Film Awards	Best Supporting Actor	Moss	Nominated
2011	12th Busan Film Critics Awards	Best Actor	The Day He Arrives	Won
2012	5th Style Icon Awards	Top 10 Style Icons	—N/a	Won
2012	Korea Advertisers Association Awards	Good Model Award	—N/a	Won
2012	21st Buil Film Awards	Best Actor	In Another Country	Nominated
2012	49th Grand Bell Awards	Best Supporting Actor	In Another Country	Nominated
2012	1st K-Drama Star Awards	Excellence Award, Actor	My Husband Got a Family	Won
2012	1st K-Drama Star Awards	Top Popularity Award	My Husband Got a Family	Won
2012	KBS Drama Awards	Top Excellence Award, Actor	My Husband Got a Family	Won
2012	KBS Drama Awards	Excellence Award, Actor in a Serial Drama	My Husband Got a Family	Nominated
2012	KBS Drama Awards	Netizen Award, Actor	My Husband Got a Family	Nominated
2012	KBS Drama Awards	Best Couple Award with Kim Nam-joo	My Husband Got a Family	Won
2013	49th Baeksang Arts Awards	Best Actor (TV)	My Husband Got a Family	Nominated
2013	50th Grand Bell Awards	Best Supporting Actor	Fists of Legend	Nominated
2013	25th Korean PD Awards	Best Performer, TV Actor category	—N/a	Won
2013	SBS Drama Awards	Top Excellence Award, Actor in a Miniseries	The Secret of Birth	Nominated
2014	8th Daegu International Musical Festival	Star of the Year Award	—N/a	Won
2015	9th Daegu International Musical Festival	Star of the Year Award	—N/a	Won
2015	4th Yegreen Musical Awards	Actor of the Year	—N/a	Won
2015	8th Korea Drama Awards	Top Excellence Award, Actor	Heard It Through the Grapevine	Nominated
2015	4th APAN Star Awards	Top Excellence Award, Actor in a Serial Drama	Heard It Through the Grapevine	Nominated
2015	SBS Drama Awards	Top Excellence Award, Actor in a Mid-length Drama	Heard It Through the Grapevine	Won
2016	3rd Wildflower Film Awards	Best Supporting Actor	A Matter of Interpretation	Nominated
2018	12th Daegu International Musical Festival	Star of the Year Award	—N/a	Won
2019	MBC Entertainment Awards	Multi-tainer Award	Funding Together	Won
2019	KBS Drama Awards	Top Excellence Award, Actor	Liver or Die	Won
2019	KBS Drama Awards	Excellence Award, Actor in a Mid-length Drama	Liver or Die	Nominated
2019	KBS Drama Awards	Netizen Award, Actor	Liver or Die	Nominated
2019	KBS Drama Awards	Best Couple Award with Shin Dong-mi	Liver or Die	Won

=== Listicles ===
Name of publisher, year listed, name of listicle, and placement
Publisher	Year	Listicle	Placement	Ref.
Forbes	2013	Korea Power Celebrity 40	12th	
Forbes	2014	Korea Power Celebrity 40	29th	
