= Oh Min-ae =

South Korean actress (born 1965)

- Born: 10 September 1965 (age 61); Seoul, South Korea
- Other name: O Min-ae
- Education: Soongsil University (Graduate in Psychological Counseling)
- Occupation: Actress
- Years active: 1999–present
- Agent: Beom Entertainment
- Known for: My Liberation Notes; The Running Actress; Blind
- Children: 1

Korean name
- Hangul: 오민애
- RR: O Minae
- MR: O Minae

Stage name
- Hangul: 오주희
- RR: O Juhui
- MR: O Chuhŭi
- Website: Official website

Oh Min-ae is a South Korean actress. She is known for her roles in dramas such as Mr. Sunshine, My Liberation Notes, The Penthouse: War in Life and Blind. She also appeared in movies The Running Actress, Memento Mori, One Line, The Outlaws and Race to Freedom: Um Bok Dong.

== Biography ==
Oh Min-ae was born on September 10, 1965, in Seoul to an unwed single mother. She had to give up high school and support herself by doing odd jobs, such as newspaper seller, delivery work, bar waitress, and teaching aerobics. When she was 27, she visited a travel agency to inquiry about backpacking trip to India. During this visit, the travel agent guessed that she might be a stage actor. This sparked her interest, and the agent introduced her to an acquaintance in the theater world. Since then, she started her acting journey, starting from theater staff.

She made her first film appearance in 1999 in Memento Mori. Starting January 1, 2000, she spent about a year and a half living as a monk at Cheongunsa Temple. After leaving the temple, she used stage name. She thought life must be hard because of her name, she wanted to be ordinary, so she used the characters for "female" and "hope." and resumed her activities as a theater actress under the name for ten years.

In her 40s, Oh later got married and had a child. She also passed the high school equivalency exam and enrolled in the Department of Cultural Studies at Broadcasting and Communication University. She needs to make money for childcare so she decided to pursue career as counselor. She entered Soongsil University's Graduate School of Social Welfare in 2010, where she earned a social worker license.

Oh Min-ae established Dongjak Theater Association (동작연극협회) with fellow theater actors. It was approved as a branch of the Seoul Theater Association on August 12, 2013. Oh served as 1st branch president until 2017. She took on various administrative roles, including serving in educational and volunteer work. Handling too many responsibilities led to depression. Financial difficulties forced her to also work as a card salesman. She rely on connections with junior colleagues in the theater. Due to her union status, she was required to do a performance called Forest Fire. Reading the play's script reignited her love of acting and made her realize she could no longer return to a salesman.

In 2015, Oh served as director of 36th Seoul Theater Festival. Oh, served as director for Dongjak Theater Association's 'Hongsiyeol-neun House' (written by Kim Jeong-suk, directed by Oh Min-ae, performed on March 10, 2016. Dongjak Theater Association's 2nd Seoul Citizen Theater Festival entry, Their Chatter.

On March 27, 2017, the founding ceremony of the Performing Arts Workers' Union took place at the multipurpose hall of the Good Performance Information Center in Marronnier Park, Daehak-ro, Seoul. Oh was elected as co-vice chairman alongside Cho Jae-hyun, while Lee Jong-seung was appointed as the first chairman.

In 2018, the MeToo movement shed light on numerous sexual violence cases within the theater community. During this period, Oh played a key role in receiving reports of these incidents and helped organize a rally demanding accountability within the community. These efforts led to personal challenges and legal troubles, including defamation lawsuits, which she handled without legal representation. Ultimately, these experiences caused her to step away from the theater scene.

Acting in films had mostly been a side job, but in 2019, with her family facing financial difficulties, her in-laws offered to help her find another job. However, she felt she could not step back from acting. Determined, she declared, "Mother, please give me just three years to pursue this seriously. If I can't establish myself, I'll go roll kimbap at a shop." Around this time, she got the script for To Each Your Sarah. Her acting in this short film won her a special jury award at the 18th Mise-en-scène Short Film Festival, which led to many more roles in short films and a busy period where she made seven short films in just six months. This experience helped her move past earlier struggles and fully commit to her film career.

Oh stars as In-sook in Beyond You, the third feature-length film by Park Hong-min. In-sook, who has Alzheimer's, struggles to hold on to her fading memories and fails to recognize her daughter, Ji-yeon. As In-sook clings to her past, Ji-yeon navigates the memories of others, while Kyung-ho is drawn into reflections of the past. The film has been screened at various festivals, including the 25th Busan International Film Festival (2020), The 46th Seoul Independent Film Festival (2020), The 16th Osaka Asian Film Festival (2021).The 9th Muju Mountain Film Festival (2021).

She featured in several independent films, including a supporting role in Yoon Seo-jin's debut feature, Chorokbam. In Director Heo Jeong-jae's feature debut, The First Child, she played a Korean-Chinese nanny working for Park Ha-sun's character. She also did supporting role in commercial film Unframed, Soulmate, A Year-End Medley.

In 2021, Oh appeared in several short films includes Treetop (Udeumji), Woman Who Killed a Lion, The Granddaughter, Obituary, My Prayer, Training Session, The Noon of Seoul, Dinner Ceremony, Dink. Oh also portrayed the independent-minded Seo-am-daek in Lee Tak's film Wasteland, which was invited to the Jeongdongjin Independent Film Festival and the 47th Seoul Independent Film Festival.

Oh starred in Missing Yoon as Soon-yi, an impersonation singer of Yoon Si-nae, marking her first leading role in a feature film. Soon-yi had emulated Yoon Si-nae for two decades, driven by her deep admiration for the artist. To prepare, Oh studied Yoon's videos and honed her singing skills. She even met Yoon in person, carefully observing every detail of her appearance, from her wig and makeup to her gentle speech. For her performance, Oh received the Best Actress Award at the 23rd Jeonju International Film Festival.

In Kim Jin-han's short film The Way to Rest, Oh takes on the role of Ha-eun's mother. The story follows Ha-eun as she returns to her hometown upon learning that her mother is terminally ill. The film garnered the Excellence Award for Director Kim Jin-han, and Oh was awarded the Stella Award for her performance at the 9th Catholic Film Festival in October 2022.

In the film Concerning My Daughter, directed by Lee Mi-rang and adapted from Kim Hye-jin's original novel, Oh plays the role of a mother. The story revolves around her character as she starts living with her daughter, Im Se-mi, and her daughter's same-sex partner, Ha Yoon-kyung. Together, they navigate their relationships and strive for a deeper understanding. The movie premiered at the Busan International Film Festival in 2023, where Oh won the Best Actress award. She also received Best Actress award at the 3rd Korea Art Film Association Awards in 2025 and the 12th Wildflower Film Awards in 2025.

== Filmography ==
Key
†	Denotes films that have not yet been released

=== Film ===
Year	Title	Role	Ref.
1999	Memento Mori	Nurse	
2013	Boomerang Family	Aunty's housekeeper	
2013	Happiness for Sale	Caregiver	
2013	The Five	Baker	
2017	One Line	Joo Hee-mo	
2017	The Running Actress	Act 2-PB team leader	
2017	The Outlaws	Garibong-dong female merchant	
2018	After Spring	Shaman	
2019	Race to Freedom: Um Bok Dong	Sang-goong	
2019	To Each Your Sarah	Jung-ja / Sarah	
2019	Way Back Home	Eun-sook	
2020	ID Card	Min-ae	
2020	Moon Power	Mother-in-law	
2020	Beyond You	Lee In-sook	
2021	The First Child	Jung-ah's aunt	
2021	Unframed	Mother	
2021	Chorokbam	O Min-a	
2021	A Year-End Medley	Sang-gyu's wife	
2022	Missing Yoon	Soon-yi	
2022	Strange	Mother	
2022	Ju Yeon	Mother	
2023	Soulmate	Yeong-ok	
2023	Because I Hate Korea	Min-ae	
2023	Concerning My Daughter	Mother	
2024	Pilot	Kim An-ja	
2027	Typhoon †	Pil-ja	

=== Television series ===
Year	Title	Role	Ref.
2009	Friend, Our Legend	Jin-sook's mother	
2011	Pit-a-pat, My Love	Ming-Ming's aunt	
2013	Miss Korea	Director Choi	
2018	Mr. Sunshine	Mr. Im's wife	
2020–21	The Penthouse: War in Life	Ms. Byeon	
2021	D.P.	Jun-mok's mother	
2021	The One and Only	Young-chan's mother	
2022	My Liberation Notes	Byeon Sang-mi	
2022	Blind	In Seong-mo	
2022	Bargain	Lee Chun-nam	
2022	The Glory	Do-yeong's mother	
2023	Trolley	Welfare center staff	
2023	The Glory Part 2	Do-yeong's mother	
2023	Dr. Romantic 3	Ko Kyung-sook	
2023	Race	Hwa-ja	
2023	Daily Dose of Sunshine	Seo-wan's mother	
2024	A Killer Paradox	Deacon Kim	
2024	The Whirlwind	Yoo Jeong-mi	
2025	When Life Gives You Tangerines	Kwon Gye-ok	
2025	Tastefully Yours	Han Yeo-ul	

== Stage ==
=== Musical ===
List of plays
Year	Title		Role	Director	Theater Group	Venue	Date
Year	English	Korean	Role	Director	Theater Group	Venue	Date
2004	The Abduction of King Yeomra	염라대왕납치사건	—N/a	Kim Hyun-mook	J. M	Jeil Hwaje Theatre	October 14 to 31, 2004
2011	Yulgok Yi I	율곡이이	Shin Saimdang	Kim Soo-bo		Paju City Hall Grand Performance Hall	2011/12/24 ~ 2011/12/24
2013	Black Swan	블랙스완	Queen	Hwang Jin-gyeong	Bujihwa	Naroo Art Center	2013.12.13 ~ 2013.12.26

=== Theater play ===
List of plays
Year	Title		Role	Director	Theater Group	Venue	Date
Year	English	Korean	Role	Director	Theater Group	Venue	Date
1992	The Last Kiss	마지막 키스	—N/a	Park Jang-soon	Batanggol	—N/a	
1992	Phoebe's Romantic Comedy	피비의 로맨틱 코메디	—N/a	Kim Hyuk-soo	Blue Bird	Samto	—N/a
1993	A Portrait of a Seeker	탈속 - 어느 구도자의 초상	Park Reporter	Kang Young-geol	Minye	Art Center Small Theater	June 4, 1993 – June 30, 1993
1993	Please Turn Off the Lights	불 좀 꺼주세요	Female	Kang Young-geol	Daehakro Theater	Daehakro Theater	January 1, 1992 – January 31, 1992
1995	The Peddler	뺑끼통	Eun-young	Yoo Seung-hee	Minye	Dongsung	January 20, 1995 – February 26, 1995
1995	Raguio	라구요	—N/a	Namgung Hyuk	Creative Village	Durebak	—N/a
1996	Arirang Jeongseon - The Sound of Life, The Sound of Love	아리랑 정선 - 삶의 소리, 사랑의 소리	Bongine	Kim Tae-soo	Minye	Hakjeon	April 26, 1996 – May 8, 1996
1997	The Pine Tree in Front of the Yard	뜰앞의 잣나무	—N/a	Kim Tae-soo	Wanjamu Pattern	Dongsung	—N/a
1998	All Houses, Beds, and Churches	모든 집, 침대, 그리고 교회	Female	Lim Su-taek	Minye	Marronnier	July 1, 1998 – September 30, 1998
1999	Daughter-in-Law's Sorrow	며느리설움	—N/a	—N/a	MBC, Minye	Sejong Cultural Center	—N/a
1999	23rd Seoul Theater Festival:Muguk Boheoja	제23회 서울연극제 : 步虛子[묵극 보허자]	Garinae	Kim Seong-gu	Kim Seong-gu Mime	Dongsung	October 2, 1999 – October 4, 1999
2001	Anti-Imperialist Committee	반민특위	N/A	Kim Hyun-mook	Yesung Dongin	Rhythm Space	—N/a
2003	Flower Wind	꽃바람	—N/a	Park Jeong-wook	Park Jeong-wook Sound	Art Center Great Theater	—N/a
2003	My Hometown in a Dream	꿈에 본 내고향	Lee Kyeong-ja	Kim Hyuk-soo	Actor Association	Dongduk Women's University Art Center	2003
2004	Let’s Live Together and Get Married	살아보고 결혼하자	—N/a	Park Byeong-mo	Yeou	Kkamang Small Theater	—N/a
2006	The Place Where Traces Remain	흔적 머무르는 곳	—N/a	Yang Seon-hee	Dance Dasom	Sejong Cultural Center	—N/a
2007	One Day	하루	—N/a	Yang Seon-hee	Dance Dasom	Sejong Cultural Center	—N/a
2008	Empress Myeongseong - I Have Something to Say	명성황후-내가 할말이 있다	Empress Myeongseong	Park Young	Tio Pepe	Ewha Women's University 100th Anniversary Hall	February 1, 2008 – February 10, 2008
2008	Her Bitter Tears	그녀의 쓰디쓴 눈물	N/A	Lim Cheol-bin	Yeoul	Gyeonggi Cultural Foundation	N/A
2008	Ashes to Ashes	재는 재로	N/A	Jang Tae-jun	SRT	Sangmyung University Art Theater	December 2, 2008 – December 14, 2008
2009	Dongchimi	동치미	Female lead	Kim Yong-eul	Globe Theater	Black Box	July 28, 2009 – August 23, 2009
2010	Arirang	아리랑	길령	Lee Woo-cheon	Daehakro Theater	Daehakro Theater	2010.12.10 ~ 2010.12.26
2011	Women’s Story - Mother’s Heart	여자이야기-엄마의 심장	N/A	Park Mi-ri	Mirror Labyrinth	Jeongmiso	N/A
2011	The Rice Barrel Next Door	이웃집 쌀통	Soo-ni	Seon Wook-hyun	Pil-tong	Ida Theater 2	March 18, 2011 – June 26, 2011
2011	Green Sun	녹색태양	professor's wife, professor	Lee Ja-soon	Salt Warehouse	Jeongmiso	December 1, 2011 – December 11, 2011
2012	White - Therapeutic Theater	화이트(치료적연극)	N/A	Park Mi-ri	Theater Therapy Association	Square Theater	September 6, 2012 ~ September 10, 2012
2012	Jo Il-jae's Comedic Patients	조일재의 병자삼인	Gong So-sa	Kim Tae-soo	Wanjamu Pattern	Daehakro Art Theater	September 13, 2012 – September 16, 2012
2013	An Endless Play	끝나지않는 연극	N/A	Son Jeong-woo	Nomad	Daehakro Art Theater	2013.05.02 to 05
2014	Mud	진흙	Script Reader	Jang Yong-cheol	Mia Ridge Arts Theater		2014.09.12 ~ 2014.09.13
2014	Mud	진흙	Script Reader	Jang Yong-cheol	Mia Ridge Arts Theater		2014.09.20 ~ 2014.09.21
2014	The Boy in Underwear	팬티 입은 소년	Mom Cooking Dog Soup	Lee Woo-cheon	(The) Daehakro Theater	Daehakro Art Theater	June 4, 2014 – June 8, 2014
2014–2015	Fish Tree	나무물고기	Budha	Kim Kyung-ik	Happy People	Art Space Orda	2014.12.17 ~ 2015.01.04
2015	Hello Angkor	안녕 앙코르	Jang Bok-sun	Son Jung-woo	Nomad		October 23 to November 8
2016	House of Ripe Persimmons	홍시열리는 집	-	Oh Min-ae	Dongjak Theater Association	Elim Hall	March
2017	Forest Fire	산불		Yoon Hyun-sik	Dongjak Theater Association	Howon Art Hall	
2017	Immortal Hero, Ahn Jung-geun	불멸의 영웅, 안중근		Yoon Woo-young		Uijeongbu Arts Center	August
2017	Facing Death Alone	홀로맞는 죽음		Chae Seung-hoon	Changpa Theater	Elim Hall	November
2017	One-Man Show	원맨쇼	mother	Park Jang-ryeol	Jigo Theater Cooperative	Shared Small Theater	December 12 to 17, 2017
2018	Mom Discovered the Sea at Fifty	엄마는 오십에 바다를 발견했다	Mother	Lee Seung-hee	Scarecrow Theater	Scarecrow Small Theater	2018.03.16 ~ 2018.07.01
2018	If I Could See You for Three Days	사흘만 볼 수 있다면		Kim Sang-jin	Dream Association	Jeongdong Cecil Theater	

== Awards and nominations ==
Name of the award ceremony, year presented, category, nominee of the award, and the result of the nomination
Award ceremony	Year	Category	Nominee / Work	Result	Ref.
Busan International Film Festival	2023	Actress of the Year	Concerning My Daughter	Won	
9th Catholic Film Festival Stella Awards	2022	Best Actress	Time For Laundry To Dry	Won	
23rd Jeonju International Film Festival Korean Competition	2022	Best Actress Award	Missing Yoon	Won	
Korean Academy of Film Arts Awards	2020	Best Actress Award	To Each Your Sarah	Won	
3rd Korea Art Film Association Awards	2025	Actress of the Year	Concerning My Daughter	Won	
18th Mise-en-scène Short Film Festival	2019	Jury Special Award for Acting	To Each Your Sarah	Won	
12nd Wildflower Film Awards	2025	Actress of the Year	Concerning My Daughter	Won	
