= Bewitching Attraction =

2006 film by Lee Ha

- South Korean theatrical release poster
- Hangul: 여교수의 은밀한 매력
- Hanja: 女敎授의 隱密한 魅力
- Lit.: The Discreet Charm of Female Professors
- RR: Yeogyosuui eunmilhan maeryeok
- MR: Yŏgyosuŭi ŭnmirhan maeryŏk
- Directed by: Lee Ha
- Starring: Moon So-ri; Ji Jin-hee
- Production companies: KD Media; Myung Films; Pancinema
- Distributed by: MK Pictures
- Release date: 16 March 2006
- Running time: 105 minutes
- Country: South Korea
- Language: Korean
- Budget: US$2,100,000
- Box office: US$2,504,320

Bewitching Attraction (Korean: 여교수의 은밀한 매력; RR: yeogyosuui eunmilhan maeryeok; lit. 'The Discreet Charm of Female Professors') is a 2006 South Korean black comedy film. The debut film by South Korean director Lee Ha, the plot revolves around a troubled professor (Moon So-ri) and her sexual escapades. The film was released on 16 March 2006, and had a total attendance of 691,735.

== Plot ==
The movie revolves around Eun-sook (Moon So-ri), a lovely but promiscuous professor in a university, who has all the male professors wrapped around her finger. When a popular comic book artist Seok-gyu (Ji Jin-hee) joins the environmental awareness group that she belongs to, he attracts the jealously of Mr. Yoo, a group member who fears that he would steal Eun-sook from him, even though Eun-sook does not return his intense love. What is not known to the rest is that Eun-sook and Seok-gyu attended the same junior high school where they share a secretive tragic history. Back then, Eun-sook was the girlfriend of Seok-gyu's older brother and the three rebellious teenagers indulged in promiscuous sex. Eun-sook worries that her past may be revealed.

== Cast ==
- Moon So-ri as Eun-suk
- Ji Jin-hee as Seok-gyu
- Park Won-sang as Young-ho
- Yoo Seung-mok as Teacher Yu
- Kim Won-joon as Chef
- Jo Sung-ha as Park Seok-ho

== See also ==
- List of Korean-language films
