= Queenmaker =

2023 South Korean television series

- Promotional poster
- Hangul: 퀸메이커
- RR: Kwinmeikeo
- MR: K'winmeik'ŏ
- Genre: Political drama
- Developed by: Netflix
- Written by: Moon Ji-young
- Directed by: Oh Jin-seok
- Starring: Kim Hee-ae; Moon So-ri; Ryu Soo-young
- Music by: Kim Jun-seok; Jeong Se-rin
- Country of origin: South Korea
- Original language: Korean
- No. of episodes: 11

Production
- Executive producers: Yoo Deok-geun (CP); Kim Jin-kyu (CP)
- Producers: Shin Hye-yeon (Insight Film); Jeong Ji-hoon (Studio Focus X); Lee Sang-Baek (AStory); Min Kwang-jin; Yun Eung-han; Jeon Sang-won
- Editor: Yang Dong-yeop
- Running time: 62–74 minutes
- Production companies: Insight Film; Studio Focus X; AStory

Original release
- Network: Netflix
- Release: April 14, 2023

Queenmaker (Korean: 퀸메이커) is a 2023 South Korean political television series written by Moon Ji-young and directed by Oh Jin-seok. It stars Kim Hee-ae, Moon So-ri, and Ryu Soo-young. All eleven episodes were released simultaneously on Netflix on April 14, 2023.

The series received generally positive reviews, with critics praising the performances of its lead actresses and its portrayal of chaebol influence on South Korean politics.

== Synopsis ==
Hwang Do-hee (Kim Hee-ae) is the head of the corporate strategy team at the powerful Eunsung Group, where she has spent over a decade as a skilled fixer — burying scandals, neutralizing opponents, and protecting the wealthy chaebol family that employs her. After a subordinate's suicide, caused in part by Do-hee's own cover-up work, shatters her conscience, she defects from Eunsung and resolves to use her political skills for a different purpose.

She approaches Oh Kyung-sook (Moon So-ri), a blunt, principled human rights lawyer known as "the Rhinoceros" for her tenacious advocacy on behalf of workers and the marginalized. Do-hee persuades Kyung-sook to enter the race for mayor of Seoul, becoming her campaign manager. The two women must navigate an increasingly ruthless battle against Eunsung's preferred candidate, Baek Jae-min (Ryu Soo-young), as the conglomerate deploys its financial power, media connections, and legal resources to ensure his election. Kyung-sook and Do-hee represent opposing instincts — principled idealism versus calculated pragmatism — and the series examines the tension between those two forces as the election reaches its climax.

== Cast ==
=== Main ===
- Kim Hee-ae as Hwang Do-hee: the former head of the strategic planning office at Eunsung Group. A sharp and experienced political operative, she serves as Oh Kyung-sook's campaign manager after breaking with the corporation that employed her.
- Moon So-ri as Oh Kyung-sook: a human rights lawyer and labor advocate nicknamed "the Rhinoceros of Justice." She enters the Seoul mayoral race as an underdog candidate backed by Do-hee.
- Ryu Soo-young as Baek Jae-min: a charismatic politician running for mayor of Seoul with the backing of Eunsung Group, and the principal electoral opponent of Oh Kyung-sook.

=== Supporting ===
- Seo Yi-sook as Son Young-sim: the chairwoman of Eunsung Group and the dominant force behind the conglomerate's political maneuvering.
- Kim Tae-hoon as Ma Joong-seok: Do-hee's ex-husband, who serves as director of policy at the National Reform Party.
- Ok Ja-yeon as Guk Ji-yeon: a former secretary of Eun Chae-ryeong who becomes the strategic planning director for Kyung-sook's campaign.
- Jin Kyung as Seo Min-jeong: an established liberal politician known as "the servant of the common people" who becomes an unexpected rival in the mayoral race.
- Lee Geung-young as Carl Yoon: a veteran political strategist in the Baek Jae-min camp with a long history of managing elections.
- Kim Byeong-ok as Yang Sun-dong: a senior party leader and national organizer for Oh Kyung-sook's political faction.
- Yoon Ji-hye as Eun Seo-jin: the older sister of Eun Chae-ryeong.
- Kim Sae-byuk as Eun Chae-ryeong: managing director of Eunsung Group and wife of Baek Jae-min.
- Seo Eun-ah as Seon-young: a field operative in Oh Kyung-sook's campaign team.
- Kim Ho-jung as Lee Cha-sun: a senior political veteran and a key supporter of Hwang Do-hee.
- Ki Do-hoon as Yoon Dong-joo: a young aide who becomes increasingly involved in the mayoral campaign on Kyung-sook's behalf.
- Kim Sun-young as Kim Hwa-soo: the general manager of a female workers' coalition, who fought against labor abuses at Eunsung Department Store.
- Park Sang-hoon as Kang Hyun-woo: Oh Kyung-sook's son.
- Hyun Bong-sik as Kang Moon-bok: Oh Kyung-sook's husband.

== Production ==
Queenmaker was written by Moon Ji-young, whose previous credits include Who Are You: School 2015, and directed by Oh Jin-seok, known for Love with Flaws (2019). The project was developed as a Netflix original series, with production handled by Insight Film, Studio Focus X, and AStory. It was formally announced in January 2023 alongside other titles in Netflix Korea's 2023 lineup.

Casting of the lead roles was confirmed in November 2021 when it was announced that Kim Hee-ae and Moon So-ri would star together. Ryu Soo-young's casting was confirmed shortly after. Principal photography took place in Seoul, South Korea.

== Reception ==
Queenmaker received generally positive reviews from critics. On the review aggregator website Rotten Tomatoes, 100% of 8 critics' reviews are positive, with an average rating of 8.5/10. Writing for NME, the reviewer praised the series as "riveting," highlighting the performances of its lead actresses and describing its depiction of political maneuvering as "absolutely riveting," while noting that its villains were at times one-dimensional. Ready Steady Cut called it the best K-drama of 2023 to that point, writing that it understood "storytelling fundamentals" and comparing its themes of corporate hegemony to those of Succession.

But Why Tho noted that the series moved from a fixer drama into a political one with surprising range, with class and gender "woven into the narrative" throughout. Some reviewers drew comparisons to American political dramas such as Scandal and House of Cards. Not all responses were positive; critics at DM Talkies argued the series failed to critically engage with the structural differences between men and women in politics, calling it a "serious miss" in its handling of feminist themes.

== Accolades ==
| Publisher | Year | Listicle | Placement | Ref. |
|---|---|---|---|---|
| Time | 2023 | The 10 Best Korean Dramas of 2023 on Netflix | Included | |
