= Sa-kwa =

- Theatrical poster
- Hangul: 사과
- Hanja: 沙果; 謝過
- RR: Sagwa
- MR: Sagwa
- Directed by: Kang Yi-kwan
- Written by: Kang Yi-kwan
- Produced by: Choe Yong-bae
- Starring: Moon So-ri; Kim Tae-woo; Lee Sun-kyun
- Cinematography: Son Su-beom
- Edited by: Park Yoo-kyeong
- Music by: Sim Hyeon-jeong
- Release dates: September 10, 2005 (Toronto International Film Festival); October 16, 2008 (South Korea)
- Running time: 118 minutes
- Country: South Korea
- Language: Korean
- Box office: $272,617

Sa-kwa (Korean: 사과; lit. 'apple; apology') is the debut film of South Korean director Kang Yi-kwan. Premiered at the 2005 Toronto International Film Festival, although not released in South Korea until late 2008. This subtle, introspective drama of shifting moods—with acute observation of the dynamics of relationships.

== Plot ==
Hyun-jung (Moon So-ri), dumped by her boyfriend of seven years, Min-seok (Lee Sun-kyun), is broken and teetering on the brink of emotional collapse as she seeks a new suitor and get married as soon as possible since her biological clock keeps ticking away. Sang-hoon (Kim Tae-woo) enters her life; Hyun-jung is attracted to his shy demeanor and marries him. But then Min-seok reconsiders and wants to return to her.

== Cast ==
- Moon So-ri as Hyun-jung
- Kim Tae-woo as Sang-hoon
- Lee Sun-kyun as Min-seok
- Kang Rae-yeon as Hye-jeong
