= Venus Talk =

- Directed by: Kwon Chil-in
- Written by: Lee Soo-ah
- Produced by: Jaime Shim; Lee Eun
- Starring: Uhm Jung-hwa; Moon So-ri; Jo Min-su
- Cinematography: Lee Hyung-deok
- Edited by: Kim Sang-bum; Kim Jae-bum
- Music by: Park In-young
- Production company: Myung Films
- Distributed by: Lotte Entertainment
- Release date: February 13, 2014
- Running time: 109 minutes
- Country: South Korea
- Language: Korean
- Box office: US$5.1 million

Venus Talk (Korean: 관능의 법칙; RR: Gwanneungui beopchik; lit. 'The Laws of Pleasures') is a 2014 South Korean film about the sex and love lives of three women in their forties, played by Uhm Jung-hwa, Moon So-ri and Jo Min-su. The romantic dramedy is directed by Kwon Chil-in. The screenplay by Lee Soo-ah won the Grand Prize at the 1st Lotte Entertainment Script Contest. It was released in theaters on February 13, 2014.

== Plot ==
Shin-hye (Uhm Jung-hwa) is a capable, successful TV producer, sometimes derided as a "gold miss" for still being single in her forties. Her protege-turned-longtime boyfriend, the current chief of their TV network, just left her for a younger woman who also happens to be Shin-hye's junior colleague.

Shin-hye has two best friends, Mi-yeon (Moon So-ri), a housewife who isn't satisfied with her sex life with her rather docile husband Jae-ho (Lee Sung-min), and Hae-young (Jo Min-su), a soft-hearted, divorced single mother who wants her grown daughter Soo-jung (Jeon Hye-jin) to move out so she can have more time with her widowed boyfriend, carpenter Sung-jae (Lee Geung-young).

Soon, life gets better for the three friends. Shin-hye begins a thrilling relationship with a younger man (Lee Jae-yoon), another TV producer who is 17 years her junior; she tries to keep the relationship casual but can't stop herself from falling for him. Mi-yeon and Jae-ho enjoy a second honeymoon after their daughter leaves to study abroad and he starts taking Viagra. Soo-jung finally gets married upon her unexpected pregnancy and moves out of Hae-young's home. But things take a turn when Hae-young is diagnosed with cancer, and Mi-yeon finds out her husband had an affair.

== Cast ==
- Uhm Jung-hwa as Jung Shin-hye
- Moon So-ri as Jo Mi-yeon
- Jo Min-su as Lee Hae-young
- Lee Geung-young as Choi Sung-jae
- Lee Sung-min as Lee Jae-ho
- Lee Jae-yoon as Hwang Hyun-seung
- Jeon Hye-jin as Kim Soo-jung
- Choi Moo-sung as Lee Sung-wook
- Kwon Hae-hyo as Representative Park
- Kim Ho-jin as Gu Dong-wook
- Jin Seon-kyu as Kim Dae-ri
- Lee So-yoon as Lee Se-young
- Seol Ji-yoon as Cafe owner
- Jang Hyuk-jin as Detective
- Kim Yong-jun as Dermatologist
- Kim Si-jeong as Internal medicine doctor
- Jo Woo-jin as PD Choi
- Jang Seo-yi as Masseuse
- BoA as Song Beom-sik (cameo)

== Awards and nominations ==
2014 Baeksang Arts Awards

- Nomination: Best Supporting Actor - Lee Geung-young
