= Magic Eye (talk show) =

- Genre: Talk show
- Starring: Lee Hyo-ri; Moon So-ri; Kim Gu-ra; Moon Hee-joon
- Country of origin: South Korea
- Original language: Korean
- No. of episodes: 20

Production
- Producers: Kim Young-wook; Kim Hwa-jung
- Running time: 60-70 minutes per episode

Original release
- Network: SBS
- Release: July 8 – November 18, 2014

Magic Eye (Korean: 매직아이) was a South Korean talk show which began on July 8, 2014, on Tuesday nights at 11:15 pm KST on SBS. The program was first shown as a pilot on May 13, 2014, and was picked up following a positive response. It was hosted by the singer Lee Hyo-ri, the actress Moon So-ri, the model Hong Jin-kyung and the comedian Kim Gu-ra. The program focused on news stories that might have been missed by viewers, aiming to find the hidden 1mm of the world. Magic Eye was the first program on Korean terrestrial television to incorporate podcasts into the program. Viewers could listen to unshown footage and behind-the-scenes commentary online after the show had been broadcast.

The program was cancelled because of low ratings, with its final episode on November 18, 2014.

== Format ==
Magic Eye was divided into two segments:

- Line Choosing News (선을 정하는 뉴스) [episodes 1-6], which was hosted by Lee Hyo-ri, Moon So-ri and Hong Jin-kyung, featured stories of everyday life issues from viewers and aimed to draw the line for them.
- Finding the Hidden Stories (숨은 얘기 찾기) [episodes 1-4], which was hosted by Kim Gu-ra and announcer Bae Sung-jae, featured the two hosts directly finding people behind hidden stories and having interviews on the spot.

The show was unified into one program with Kim Gu-ra joining the other three female hosts in a similar format to Line Choosing News, beginning on August 19, 2014.
