= Moon So-ri =

South Korean actress (born 1974)

- 문소리
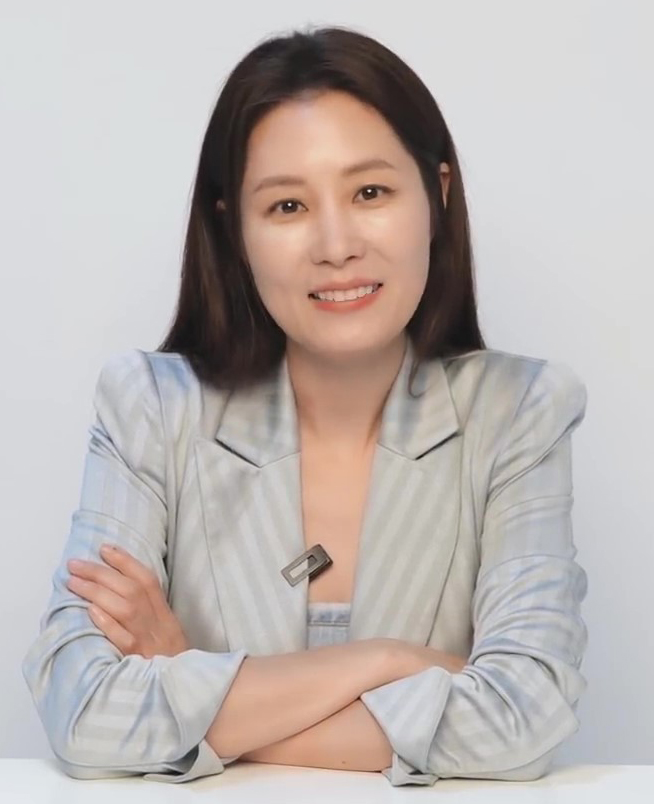
- Moon in 2021
- Born: July 2, 1974 (age 52); Busan, South Korea
- Education: Sungkyunkwan University
- Occupations: Actress; film director; screenwriter
- Years active: 1995–present
- Agent: Yooborn Company
- Works: Filmography; theater
- Spouse: Jang Joon-hwan (m. 2006)
- Children: 1
- Awards: Full list
- Honours: Okgwan Order of Cultural Merit (2002)

Korean name
- Hangul: 문소리
- Hanja: 文素利
- RR: Mun Sori
- MR: Mun Sori

Moon So-ri (Korean: 문소리; born July 2, 1974) is a South Korean actress and filmmaker. She began her career on stage as part of the theater company Hangang and made her feature film debut in Lee Chang-dong's Peppermint Candy (1999). Moon gained international recognition for the romantic drama Oasis (2002), which earned her the Marcello Mastroianni Award at the 59th Venice International Film Festival, making her the second South Korean recipient.

Over the following decades, Moon has collaborated extensively with auteurs such as Im Sang-soo, Hong Sang-soo, and Zhang Lü. Her notable films include A Good Lawyer's Wife (2003), Forever the Moment (2008), Ha Ha Ha (2010), Hill of Freedom (2014), and Ode to the Goose (2018). She earned further acclaim for the drama film Three Sisters (2020). Alongside her screen career, she has remained active on stage with the company Chaimu, and expanded into directing with several short films and the feature The Running Actress (2017).

In the 2020s, Moon increased her work in streaming and television productions, appearing in series such as On the Verge of Insanity (2021), Queenmaker (2023), and When Life Gives You Tangerines (2025).

== Early life and education ==
Moon So-ri was born in Busan, South Korea, on July 2, 1974. She is the eldest daughter of Moon Chang-jun, a taxi driver, and Lee Hyang-ran, a street-food vendor, and has one younger brother Moon Yang-il. Her family relocated to Samjeon-dong, Songpa-gu, Seoul, during her fifth year of elementary school. She subsequently attended Seoul Samjeon Elementary School, Seokchon Middle School, and Jamsil Girls' High School.

In 1990, as a freshman at Jamsil Girls' High School, Moon watched her first play, Equus, which starred Shin Goo and Choi Min-sik. This experience sparked her interest in acting. However, her frail health and a restrictive upbringing limited her access to acting at that time. From middle school, her parents required her to study violin and classical literature. Later she majored in education at Sungkyunkwan University.

Upon university enrollment in 1993, Moon's improved health allowed her to actively pursue acting. She joined both the drama club and the Korean traditional music club, where she studied instruments such as the gayageum. She undertook pansori under Nam Hae-seong, the owner of the pansori Sugungga, which included a month of intensive study in Namwon.

In 1995, during her third year of university, Moon joined the theater group Hangang ("Han River"), which led her to forgo midterm examinations. She initially performed administrative tasks before participating in the original play Classroom Idea. She secured a role portraying a wealthy girl due to her violin skills, joining the production midway through rehearsals. Moon remained with Hangang until 1997. She supported herself through part-time jobs, using her earnings to fund ballet lessons, which resulted in her graduating from college approximately 18 months later than her peers.

== Acting career ==
=== 1999–2005: Early career and breakthrough roles in films ===
After graduating from Sungkyunkwan University in February 1999, Moon applied for the 26th MBC open talent exam, but failed. Recognizing her limited prior acting experience and industry connections, she chose to pursue academic study in acting and was accepted into the Department of Theater at Seoul Institute of the Arts.

That year, Moon learned of an audition for Lee Chang-dong's Peppermint Candy through Cine21. The audition process lasted two to three months, during which she considered whether to pursue the role or continue her college education. After consulting an assistant director, she contacted Lee directly. Although Lee could not guarantee the role, he advised her to make her own decision. Moon opted to withdraw from college and received a tuition refund. Despite industry preference for a more established actress, she secured the role after competing against 2,000 other hopefuls, making her debut alongside Sul Kyung-gu. Lee was reportedly impressed by Moon's natural and relatable presence, and her initiative in contacting him also influenced the casting.

For two years following Peppermint Candy, Moon did not receive any feature film offers, and a television drama offer was ultimately given to another actress. During this period, she primarily appeared in short films, including Black Cut (2001), The 19th Plan of the Outer Space (2001), To the Spring Mountain (2001), To Bomsan (2002), Sangam-dong World Cup (2002), and The Match (2002), and served as a narrator for documentaries. Holding a teaching license, Moon taught Chinese characters to elementary students and tutored disabled individuals at a welfare center. During this time, she reconnected with Lee Chang-dong who was volunteering while researching for his upcoming film Oasis.

In Lee Chang-dong's Oasis, Moon reunited with Sul Kyung-gu to portray Han Gong-ju, a woman with cerebral palsy. Initially considering established actors, Lee asked Moon to submit an audition tape within two weeks using a 6mm camera. Moon prepared by studying cerebral palsy documentaries but struggled with the portrayal and considered withdrawing until actress Oh Ji-hye encouraged her to submit the tape. Moon then spent an additional two months on intensive preparation, which included script study and gaining firsthand experience of disability by using a wheelchair. Filming for Oasis lasted six months. Her portrayal earned her the Marcello Mastroianni Award for Emerging Actress at the 2002 Venice Film Festival—making her the second Korean recipient after Kang Soo-yeon in 1985 for The Surrogate Woman—and Best Actress at the Seattle International Film Festival.

The following year, Moon gained further acclaim in Im Sang-soo's third film A Good Lawyer's Wife. A 180-degree turn from her previous screen image, this film featured her as a free thinking woman in a decaying marriage who starts an affair with the teenage boy next door. This film was also invited to the Venice Film Festival, and she later won the Best Actress award from the Stockholm International Film Festival. Similar to the case with Oasis, Best Actress honors at many domestic awards ceremonies followed.

In 2004, Moon acted as Song Kang-ho's character wife, Kim Min-ja, in Im Chan-sang's The President's Barber, a film that illustrates 20 years of modern Korean history through the eyes of president Park Chung Hee's personal barber. She took a more central role in her next feature Sa-kwa, an introspective relationship drama about a woman who embarks on a new relationship after being dumped by her long-time boyfriend. Also from 2005, Bravo, My Life! saw her return to the historical era of the late 70s/early 80s in a family drama set against the political upheaval of those times.

=== 2006–2009: Film career, return to theater, and television debut ===
Returning to theater, Moon performed in two-hander play Sad Play alongside Park Won-sang. Written and directed by Min Bok-gi and produced by Theater Company Chaimu, the play depicted the emotional journey of a middle-aged couple confronting the husband's impending death. It ran at the Information Small Theater in Daehangno from February to March 2006.

Moon also portrayed a sexually promiscuous professor opposite Ji Jin-hee in Lee Ha's directorial debut Bewitching Attraction. Subsequently, she appeared as a disapproving sister in Family Ties, for which she shared Best Actress honors with Go Doo-shim, Gong Hyo-jin, and Kim Hye-ok at the 2006 Thessaloniki Film Festival, where the film also received Best Picture and Best Screenplay.

She later appeared in another Chaimu production, There, directed by Yi Sang-woo. Adapted from Conor McPherson's The Weir and localized to the Gangwon Province seaside, the play featured an ensemble cast including Jeong Won-joong, Lee Dae-yeon, Kim Seung-wook, Lee Sung-min, Min Bok-gi, Park Won-sang, Kim Du-yong, Choi Deok-moon, Oh Yong, Park Ji-ah, and Jeon Hye-jin. It ran at Daehangno Arts Center 2 from May 3 to June 25.

Moon made her television debut in 2007 with the fantasy-period drama The Legend, where her performance received criticism. Following this, she narrated My Heart Is Not Broken Yet, a My Heart Is Not Broken Yet, a documentary detailing Song Sin-do's decade-long lawsuit against the Japanese government for an official apology for comfort women.

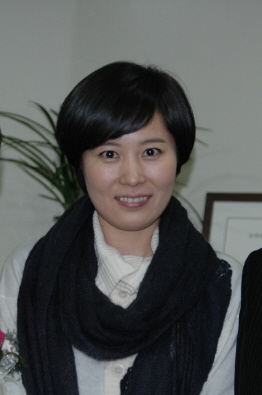
Moon in 2008

In 2008, Moon was featured in the sports film Forever the Moment, which became a sleeper hit. Subsequently, she starred in her second television drama, MBC's All About My Family (2008–2009) as Lee Hwang, a career woman navigating personal and family challenges. Despite initial low ratings, the show gradually gained more viewership, and Moon's performance earned positive reviews and later won the Excellence Actress Award Award at the 2008 MBC Drama Awards. Reflecting on her experience, Moon remarked, "I was very confused by the drama production system, which is different from movies, and the characters that change over time. However, even athletes with great athletic ability make mistakes. I think that even if there are setbacks, there is no better experience than this. Now, my vague fear of dramas has largely disappeared."

In 2009, she was featured in two films, the human rights-themed Fly, Penguin and Baik Hyun-jin's short film The End, where she was one of four featured characters.

In the following year, Moon made a special appearance in the 2010 film A Little Pond, director Yi Sang-woo's of Theater Company Chaimu directorial debut. The film depicts the No Gun Ri Massacre, a Korean War tragedy where U.S. forces killed South Korean refugees. Later, Moon joined the ensemble cast of Hong Sang-soo's Ha Ha Ha. The film won the top prize in the Un Certain Regard section of the 2010 Cannes Film Festival.

That same year, She returned onstage in the 2010 Korean premiere of The Pitmen Painters, produced by Myeongdong Art Theater. Directed by Yi Sang-woo, the production featured an ensemble cast from Chaimu, including Kwon Hae-hyo. The play, set in the 1930s, tells the true story of a group of miners from Northumberland who hire an art professor and eventually gain recognition as artists.

=== 2011–2016: Broadening scope: film, stage, and international jury engagements ===
Moon lend her voice for Leafie, A Hen into the Wild, played the main character hen 'Ipsak'. Her voice acting was praised as "superb [...] instantly recognizable and articulating the gumption and touching naivete of the eponymous hen with great conviction," and in 2011 Leafie became the most successful Korean animated film of the modern era, with over 2 million admissions. That same year, Moon joined Konkuk University's Faculty of Arts as a professor of film studies.

In 2012, she worked again with Hong Sang-soo in In Another Country, which was headlined by French actress Isabelle Huppert, of whom Moon is a fan.

Because she found his script "unique and creative," Moon took a risk on newbie director Park Myung-rang and joined the cast of his 2013 crime thriller An Ethics Lesson. She then reunited with Sul Kyung-gu in the spy comedy The Spy: Undercover Operation.

In 2014, Moon starred in Venus Talk, about the romantic and sex lives of three women in their forties. She also appeared in Park Chan-kyong's fantasy/documentary Manshin: Ten Thousand Spirits that looked at Korean modern history through the checkered past and exorcism-based imagination of a shaman. Another Hong Sang-soo feature, Hill of Freedom, followed. On television, she was selected as one of the co-hosts of a new talk show, Magic Eye; this was the first time Moon had been involved in variety programming.

In 2015, Moon became the first Korean actor invited as a jury member of the Locarno International Film Festival; festival artistic director Carlo Chatrian lauded her "brave choices (in selecting projects)" and called Moon "the jewel of the Korean movie industry". The following year, she was invited to the Venice International Film Festival, where she became the first South Korean actor to serve as a juror on the Orizzonti section.

In 2016, Moon appeared as Jang Ma-ri, the wife of spy Kim Ki-young (portrayed by Ji Hyun-jun), in the play Empire of Light. Directed by French director Arthur Nauzyciel. This production was a collaboration between the National Theater Company of Korea and the Théâtre d'Orléans in France, based on the novel of the same name by Kim Young-ha. Performances were held in Korea from March 4 to 20, 2016, and subsequently in Orléans, France, for four days beginning May 17.

Moon also had a notable guest role in Park Chan-wook's film The Handmaiden as Hideko's aunt. Although her part was brief, lasting only 15 minutes across four scenes, her performance, particularly in the reading scene, was praised. Moon was lauded for her visual portrayal, facial expressions, voice, and intonation as a Japanese aristocrat. She spent four months preparing for the role, focusing on mastering natural Japanese speech, reading, and writing, and studying rakugo performances to embody her character effectively. The Handmaiden was selected to compete for the Palme d'Or at the 2016 Cannes Film Festival. For her role, Moon won Best Supporting Actress at the 11th Asian Film Awards.

=== 2017–2020: Continued success and acclaim ===
In 2017, Moon portrayed political journalist Jung Jae-yi in The Mayor. This marked her first on-screen collaboration with Choi Min-sik, an actor she had long admired since seeing him in Equus during high school, and with whom she had previously worked as a voice actor in the animated film Leafie, A Hen into the Wild. Choi personally visited her during a play to cast her for the role. For her performance, she was nominated for Best Supporting Actress at the 54th Grand Bell Awards.

In 2018, Moon took on the supporting role of Oh Se-hwa, Chief of the Neurosurgery Department and Director of Sangkook University Hospital, in the JTBC drama series Life. The series starred Lee Dong-wook as Ye Jin-woo, an emergency medicine specialist, and Cho Seung-woo as Koo Seung-hyo, CEO of Sangkook University Hospital. Moon returned to theater in April, appearing in Altruism - Nassim, a 70-minute-play performed as part of the Doosan Humanities Theater 2018. Nassim was a unique one-person play where actors improvise based on a script they encounter for the first time on stage during the performance. Moon also voiced The Underdog, which was directed by Leafie, A Hen into the Wild director. Subsequently, she made a special appearance in the Korean film adaptation of the Japanese manga series Little Forest, portraying the mother of Kim Tae-ri's character.

In October 2018, Moon starred in two films that premiered at the 23rd Busan International Film Festival: Zhang Lü's Ode to the Goose and Yi Ok-seop's Maggie. Ode to the Goose features Moon as Song-hyun, on a trip to Gunsan with Yoon-young (Park Hae-il) that explores their evolving relationship, a role for which she received a Best Actress nomination at the 24th Chunsa Film Art Awards. In Maggie, Lee Ok-seop's debut feature, Moon plays Lee Kyung-jin, the hospital vice director who receives nurse Yoon-young's (Lee Joo-young) resignation following a mysterious X-ray incident.

In 2019, Moon starred in the legal film Juror 8, portraying presiding judge Kim Jun-gyeom, who presides over Korea's first citizen participation trial. Park Hyung-sik played Kwon Nam-woo, a young entrepreneur unexpectedly selected as a juror for the historic trial. In October 2019, she reunited with actor Ji Hyun-jun and French director Arthur Nauzyciel for the first time in three years since play Empire of Light with the Korean premiere of Pascal Rambert's play Love's End.

In 2020, Moon acted as Hye-ra in "Proof of Humanity," an episode of science fiction anthology television series SF8, directed by Kim Ui-seok. She portrayed a mother who revives her son as an android but suspects the AI destroyed his soul. Her performance was praised for its nuanced, restrained depiction of complex maternal emotions, showcasing an "overwhelming presence" that deeply resonated with viewers and earned significant commendation from the director. She also made a special appearance in Netflix Series The School Nurse Files, as Hwa-soo, director of acupuncture institute and friend of Eun-young (Jung Yu-mi).

=== 2021–present: Career resurgence ===
In 2021, Moon appeared in the film Three Sisters, in which she earned two Best Actress awards at the prestigious 42nd Blue Dragon Film Awards and 41st Korean Association of Film Critics Awards, and a nomination at the 57th Baeksang Arts Awards category in the Best Actress – Film.

In June 2021, Moon starred in the MBC drama On the Verge of Insanity alongside Jung Jae-young and Lee Sang-yeob. She portrayed Dang Ja-young, the dedicated head of the HR team known for her exceptional leadership skills and sharp intellect, earning respect from her colleagues and trust from her superiors.

In 2022, Moon was featured in Kim Ji-hoon's school bullying film I Want to Know Your Parents, a delayed production filmed in 2017. Written by Gim Gyung-mi and based on the Japanese play Oya no Kao ga Mitai by Seigo Hatasawa, the film reunited her with Sul Kyung-gu and co-stars Chun Woo-hee, Oh Dal-su, and Ko Chang-seok.

Moon also appeared in a supporting role in the Netflix action comedy film Seoul Vibe, directed by Moon Hyun-sung from a story written by Sua Shin. The film features an ensemble cast led by Yoo Ah-in, with Moon portraying Kang In-sook, a highly influential figure in the underground economy. Later that year, Moon returned to the stage to reprise her role as Helen Sutherland in Lee Hall's play The Pitmen Painters. Directed by Yi Sang-woo, the production was performed at the Doosan Art Center from December 2022 to January 2023.

In 2023, Moon appeared in two streaming series. The first, released in April on Netflix, was the political drama Queen Maker, where she portrayed Oh Kyung-sook, a human rights lawyer known as the "rhino of justice," who joins the Seoul mayoral election campaign. Kim Hee-ae played her campaign manager, Hwang Do-hee, while Ryu Soo-young portrayed her opponent. Her second series, released in May on Disney+, was the work drama Race. In the series, Moon portrayed Gu Ui-jeong, a public relations expert who becomes CCO due to her friendship with the new CEO, Se-yong. Her character aims to transform the culture of a traditional company, initially driven by personal motives but later striving for significant changes.

In the following year, Moon had guest appearances in two dramas and played the main lead in a play. She starred in the tvN drama Jeongnyeon: The Star Is Born as Seo Yong-rye, a talented singer and the mother of Kim Tae-ri's character. She dedicated nearly a year to training for her performance of the pansori song "Chewolmanjeong." In Season 2 of Netflix Series Hellbound, Moon portrayed antagonist character Lee Soo-kyung, a senior presidential secretary for civil affairs, who seeks to restore balance in a chaotic world dominated by the Arrowheads. Despite her limited screen time, she was praised for her sharp dialogue and expressive facial expressions. In October, Moon portrayed Bella in Adam Rapp's two-hander play The Sound Inside. Bella, a professor of English literature at Yale University, grapples with her inner loneliness and complex emotions after a terminal illness diagnosis. Moon's performance was lauded for her energy, precise diction, vocalization, and nuanced acting.

In January 2024, Moon was confirmed for Kim Won-seok Netflix series When Life Gives You Tangerines, written by Lim Sang-choon. She played the role of middle-aged Oh Ae-sun, with IU portraying the younger version. The series was released in March 2025.

== Filmmaking career ==
Moon made her directorial debut with the short film The Actress, in which she played the title character who goes mountain climbing with friends then meets up for drinks with a group of male acquaintances; once alcohol has loosened the tongues of her companions, she learns their prejudices against her. It premiered at the 19th Busan International Film Festival, where she also co-hosted the opening ceremony with Ken Watanabe. Along with two other short films The Running Actress and The Best Director, the feature-length film premiered in 2017. Moon has cited Lee Chang-dong as a key influence on her directorial work, saying that she thought about her experience with Lee a lot while making these three shorts.

== Personal life ==
On December 24, 2006, Moon married director Jang Joon-hwan. Both Sungkyunkwan University alumni, the two reportedly met when Jang directed her in the 2003 music video for Jung Jae-il's "Flower of Tears". After suffering a miscarriage in 2010, Moon gave birth to a daughter on August 4, 2011.

== Filmography ==
- Peppermint Candy (1999)
- Oasis (2002)
- A Good Lawyer's Wife (2003)
- Family Ties (2006)
- Forever the Moment (2008)
- Ha Ha Ha (2010)
- The Spy: Undercover Operation (2013)
- Hill of Freedom (2014)
- The Running Actress (2017)
- Ode to the Goose (2018)
- Three Sisters (2020)
- On the Verge of Insanity (2021)
- Queenmaker (2023)
- When Life Gives You Tangerines (2025)

== Theater ==
Acting credit of Moon in theater play(s)
Year	Title		Role	Theater	Date	Ref.
Year	English	Korean	Role	Theater	Date	Ref.
1996	Classroom	교실이데야	—N/a			
2006	Sad Play	슬픈 연극	Sim Suk-ja	Daehak-ro Information Theatre	February 10 – March 26, 2006	
2006	There	거기	Kim Jeong	JTN Art Hall 2	May 3 – June 25, 2006	
2010	The Pitmen Painters	광부화가들	Helen	Myeongdong Arts Theatre	May 5–30, 2010	
2016	The Empire of Lights	빛의 제국	Jang Ma-ri	Myeongdong Arts Theatre	March 4–27, 2016	
2018	Doosan Humanities Theater 2018 Altruism - Nassim	두산인문극장 2018 이타주의자 - 낫심	Actor	Doosan Art Center Space111	April 10–29, 2016	
2019	Love's End	사랑의 끝	Woman	Wooran Cultural Foundation Wooran 2	September 7–27, 2019	
2022–2023	The Pitmen Painters	광부화가들	Helen	Doosan Art Centre Yeongang Hall	December 1, 2012 – January 22, 2023	
2024	The Sound Inside	사운드 인사이드	Bella	Chungmu Art Centre Black Theater	August 13 – October 27, 2024	
