= Oasis (2002 film) =

2002 film by Lee Chang-dong

- Theatrical release poster
- Hangul: 오아시스
- RR: Oasiseu
- MR: Oasisŭ
- Directed by: Lee Chang-dong
- Written by: Lee Chang-dong
- Produced by: Myung Gye-nam; Jo Min-cheol; Jeon Yang-jun
- Starring: Sul Kyung-gu; Moon So-ri
- Cinematography: Choi Young-taek
- Edited by: Kim Hyeon
- Music by: Lee Jae-jin
- Distributed by: CJ Entertainment; Cineclick Asia
- Release date: August 15, 2002
- Running time: 132 minutes
- Country: South Korea
- Language: Korean
- Budget: US$1.5 million
- Box office: US$6.7 million

Oasis (Korean: 오아시스) is a 2002 South Korean romantic psychological drama film directed by Lee Chang-dong. The film's plot depicts the difficult romance between a mildly mentally disabled man who has just been released from jail after a 2 1/2-year sentence for involuntary manslaughter and a woman with severe cerebral palsy. Starring in these roles are Sul Kyung-gu and Moon So-ri, who played the couple in Chang-dong's previous film, Peppermint Candy (1999). The film also shows how the two main characters are treated by their families and perceived by the people around them.

The film was a critical success, earning prizes in numerous film festivals. Among the most important were Silver Lion for Best Direction and the Special Director's prize given to Lee Chang-dong at the 2002 Venice Film Festival and the Marcello Mastroianni Award for Emerging Actor or Actress given to Moon So-ri at the same event.

== Plot ==
After serving a two-and-a-half-year prison term for a hit-and-run, mentally disabled social misfit Hong Jong-du returns to the streets of Seoul and discovers that his family has moved without telling him. For non-payment of a restaurant bill, he again ends up in police custody. He is bailed out by his younger brother Jong-sae and reunited with his estranged family, who reluctantly take him back in. On the recommendation of his older brother Jong-il, he is hired as a delivery boy for a Chinese restaurant.

In an awkward attempt at reconciliation, Jong-du seeks out the family of the man killed in the accident. He finds the man's son moving out and leaving behind his neglected cerebral palsy-stricken sister Gong-ju in the care of neighbors, while he uses her disability status to secure a better subsidized apartment. The family is horrified at Jong-du's intrusion, but he becomes intrigued by Gong-ju. Jong-du decides to woo Gong-ju by sending flowers, and discovers where her house keys are hidden. Letting himself in when she is alone, he awkwardly makes conversation and leaves his card for her to call him. Jong-du loses control when trying to pacify a startled Gong-ju and attempts to force himself on the helpless woman, stopping only when she faints.

Fired from his job after crashing the scooter, Jong-du is given the opportunity to work in his brother's auto repair shop, where he also sleeps at night. A couple of days later to his surprise, Gong-ju calls him in the middle of the night. After a number of secret encounters and outings, the two misfits become inseparable. Gong-ju tells him how frightened she is of a shadow from a tree outside her window. Jong-du promises her that she no longer has to be afraid because he will make the shadows disappear by magic.

On their adventures outside of the apartment, the couple is faced with the harsh reality of a discriminating society but is comforted by the innocent sanctity of their love. Tempers flare when Jong-du naively brings Gong-ju to his mother's birthday celebration. It is revealed that his older brother was the actual culprit of the hit-and-run, and the family was glad when Jong-du, who had a criminal record, volunteered to go to jail in his place.

Wanting to be treated like a woman, Gong-ju invites Jong-du back to her apartment where they make love, but they are interrupted by her brother. Jong-du is arrested and charged with rape. Gong-ju, who is in too much distress to be understood, is ignored by her family and the police. In a final burst of passion, Jong-du escapes from the police and rushes to Gong-ju's apartment. The couple reaffirms their love as Jong-du fulfills his promise of making the shadows disappear by climbing the tree and cutting the branches off, while Gong-ju plays music from her radio at maximum volume in response. Jong-du then falls and is hauled off to prison. In a final scene, Gong-ju is cleaning her apartment alone, while Jong-du's voice is heard reading a letter to her, promising to come back when he is released.

== Cast ==
- Sul Kyung-gu as Hong Jong-du
- Moon So-ri as Gong-ju
- Ahn Nae-sang as Jong-il
- Ryoo Seung-wan as Jong-sae
- Son Byong-ho as Han Sang-shik

== Reception ==
Oasis received critical acclaim. On the review aggregator website Rotten Tomatoes, the film holds an approval rating of 90% based on 30 reviews, with the site's consensus reading: "Lead actress Moon So-ri's stand out performance gives this harrowing film much of its power." On Metacritic, the film has a weighted average score of 79 out of 100 based on 14 critics, indicating "generally favorable" reviews.

Roger Ebert gave the film three out of four stars, calling it "a brave film" for its depiction of two people who find a difficult relationship possible despite their isolation from family and society. G. Allen Johnson of the San Francisco Chronicle praised Moon So-ri's performance, writing that the film "succeeds or fails based on her performance" and describing her portrayal as "flawless". Johnson concluded that Lee's "humanitarian plea for tolerance" was one of the most original films of the decade.

However, in 40th Grand Bell awards, the film received no nominations.

== Awards and nominations ==
The film was selected as South Korea's official submission for the Academy Award for Best Foreign Language Film at the 75th Academy Awards.

Year	Award	Category	Recipient	Result
2002	59th Venice International Film Festival	Golden Lion	Oasis	Nominated
2002	59th Venice International Film Festival	FIPRESCI Prize	Oasis	Won
2002	59th Venice International Film Festival	SIGNIS Award	Oasis	Won
2002	59th Venice International Film Festival	Premio CinemAvvenire	Oasis	Won
2002	59th Venice International Film Festival	Silver Lion for Best Direction	Lee Chang-dong	Won
2002	59th Venice International Film Festival	Marcello Mastroianni Award	Moon So-ri	Won
2002	2nd Bergen International Film Festival	Jury Award - Honorable Mention	Lee Chang-dong	Won
2002	Vancouver International Film Festival	Chief Dan George Humanitarian Award	Lee Chang-dong	Won
2002	10th Chunsa Film Art Awards	Best Film	Oasis	Won
2002	10th Chunsa Film Art Awards	Best Director	Lee Chang-dong	Won
2002	10th Chunsa Film Art Awards	Best Actor	Sul Kyung-gu	Won
2002	10th Chunsa Film Art Awards	Best Actress	Moon So-ri	Won
2002	10th Chunsa Film Art Awards	Best Screenplay	Lee Chang-dong	Won
2002	23rd Blue Dragon Film Awards	Best New Actress	Moon So-ri	Won
2002	3rd Women in Film Korea Awards	Best Actress	Moon So-ri	Won
2002	22nd Korean Association of Film Critics Awards	Best Film	Oasis	Won
2002	22nd Korean Association of Film Critics Awards	Best Actor	Sul Kyung-gu	Won
2002	22nd Korean Association of Film Critics Awards	Best Actress	Moon So-ri	Won
2002	1st Korean Film Awards	Best Film	Oasis	Won
2002	1st Korean Film Awards	Best Director	Lee Chang-dong	Won
2002	1st Korean Film Awards	Best Actor	Sul Kyung-gu	Won
2002	1st Korean Film Awards	Best Actress	Moon So-ri	Won
2002	1st Korean Film Awards	Best New Actress	Moon So-ri	Won
2002	1st Korean Film Awards	Best Screenplay	Lee Chang-dong	Won
2002	3rd Busan Film Critics Awards	Best Screenplay	Lee Chang-dong	Won
2002	3rd Busan Film Critics Awards	Best Actor	Sul Kyung-gu	Won
2002	5th Director's Cut Awards	Best Actor	Sul Kyung-gu	Won
2002	5th Director's Cut Awards	Best New Actress	Moon So-ri	Won
2002	Cine 21 Awards	Best Director	Lee Chang-dong	Won
2002	Cine 21 Awards	Best Actor	Sul Kyung-gu	Won
2002	Cine 21 Awards	Best Actress	Moon So-ri	Won
2002	Cine 21 Awards	Best Screenplay	Lee Chang-dong	Won
2003	38th Baeksang Arts Awards	Best Film	Oasis	Won
2003	38th Baeksang Arts Awards	Best Director	Lee Chang-dong	Won
2003	29th Seattle International Film Festival	Best Actor	Sul Kyung-gu	Won
2003	29th Seattle International Film Festival	Best Actress	Moon So-ri	Won
2003	Brisbane International Film Festival	Netpac Award	Lee Chang-dong	Won
2003	Castellinaria International Festival of Young Cinema	Three Castles	Lee Chang-dong	Won
2003	Gardanne Film Festival	Audience Award	Lee Chang-dong	Won
2004	20th Independent Spirit Awards	Best International Film	Oasis	Nominated

== See also ==
- List of submissions to the 75th Academy Awards for Best Foreign Language Film
- List of South Korean submissions for the Academy Award for Best International Feature Film
