= A Good Lawyer's Wife =

- Theatrical poster
- Hangul: 바람난 가족
- Hanja: 바람난 家族
- RR: Baramnan gajok
- MR: Paramnan kajok
- Directed by: Im Sang-soo
- Written by: Im Sang-soo
- Produced by: Shim Bo-gyeong; Shin Chul
- Starring: Moon So-ri; Hwang Jung-min; Youn Yuh-jung; Kim In-mun; Bong Tae-gyu; Baek Jeong-rim
- Cinematography: Kim Woo-hyung
- Edited by: Lee Eun-soo
- Music by: Kim Hong-jib
- Production companies: Myung Films; Chungeorahm Film
- Release date: August 14, 2003
- Running time: 104 minutes
- Country: South Korea
- Language: Korean

A Good Lawyer's Wife (Korean: 바람난 가족; RR: Baramnan gajok) is a 2003 South Korean crime drama film written and directed by Im Sang-soo. The film is about the various affairs of members of a dysfunctional South Korean family.

== Plot ==
Ju Yeong-jak (Hwang Jung-min) is a successful lawyer who works long hours. While he is working, his wife Eun Ho-jeong (Moon So-ri), who gave up her dancing career in order to be "a good lawyer's wife," raises their young adopted son (Kim Young-chan) and works as a dance instructor in the local gym.

Ju Yeong-jak's father, Ju Chang-geun (Kim In-mun), an alcoholic with a terminal liver failure, has not slept with his wife Hong Byung-han (Youn Yuh-jung) in 15 years. She is having an affair with another man, and when Chang-geun finally dies, she tells Yeong-jak and Ho-jeong about her relationship with the other man—an old friend from her grade school—and says that she even plans to marry him. Her daughter-in-law Ho-jeong supports her.

Ho-jeong herself cannot achieve an orgasm from Yeong-jak. But for reasons that are not made clear in the English subtitles, he is not satisfied by her either and is having an affair with Kim Yeon, a younger woman who is an artist and a former model (Baek Jeong-rim). He receives from Yeon the satisfaction he lacks at home.

When Ho-jeong catches her teenage neighbor Shin Ji-woon (Bong Tae-gyu) peeping on her undressing in her apartment, she is, at first, angered. But she then decides to fulfill his peeping wish and allows him to see her doing nude gymnastics through the window. He then follows her on his bike and even barges into her dance class. She eventually follows him to the cinema where they talk. As they watch a movie, she teases him by acting oblivious to him groping her breasts.

Meanwhile, Yeong-jak runs a drunk motor cyclist off the road while receiving oral sex from his young mistress. Yeong-jak takes the man to a hospital but drops off his girlfriend on the way; his primary concern is that the presence of his girlfriend not become public knowledge. Due to the other driver's reputation as a quarrelsome eccentric alcoholic, the authorities assume that the other driver is entirely responsible for the crash.

Yeong-jak promises the man (Sung Ji-ru), a postman who needs to be able to drive to keep his job, that if the postman does not mention that there was a woman in the car he will use his legal connections to make sure that the man does not suffer any consequences for having been driving while drunk.

Yeong-jak goes out into the country to inform his grandfather of the death and discovers that his grandfather has been dead for six months, and that his grandfather's young female companion had not notified the other members of the family.

Ji-woon's father soon finds out about their affair and exposes it to Yeong-jak, unaware that Yeong-jak apparently does not care what his wife does. However, Yeong-jak fails to keep his promise to the postman. The postman kidnaps Yeong-jak's adopted son and throws him off a building to his death. The postman then commits suicide.

Yeong-jak and Ho-jeong are devastated by their son's death. Ho-jeong blames Yeong-jak for starting the chain of circumstances that ended with the murder/suicide.

One evening, Ho-jeong finally learns about her husband's affair and confronts him. Yeong-jak then brings up her affair with Ji-woon which turns into a physical altercation and Yeong-jak hurts her hand. Yeong-jak takes her to a hospital. After that Ho-jeong tells Ji-woon to follow her without giving any details except suggestively saying "I hope you'll be okay." She takes him to the abandoned dance hall. Without exchanging a word, she just allows him to mount her, but he soon stops and rolls aside (apparently the victim of premature ejaculation). Not giving up, she fellates him. She then mounts him herself while at the same time giving him a handjob, moving in spasms and moaning loudly as she finally gains her long sought orgasm.

The story ends on an enigmatic note. Ho-jeong discovers that she is pregnant and knows that Yeong-jak cannot be the father. He offers to accept the child as his own but she informs him that he is "out of the picture."

It is unclear from the final scene if Yeong-jak is hurt or relieved by her announcement.

The story also addresses the legacy of the Korean War and its impact on many families. Yeong-jak's father and grandfather escaped from the communist north—apparently during the war. Yeong-jak's grandmother and his father's sisters remained in the north and "perished". Yeong-jak's father is last seen in the final stages of dementia singing a communist anthem honoring North Korean leader Kim Il Sung.

== Cast ==
- Moon So-ri as Eun Ho-jung
- Hwang Jung-min as Ju Yeong-jak
- Youn Yuh-jung as Hong Byung-han
- Kim In-mun as Ju Chang-geun
- Bong Tae-gyu as Shin Ji-woon
- Baek Jeong-rim as Kim Yeon

== Awards and nominations ==
Year	Award	Category	Recipient	Result	Ref.
2003	13th Stockholm International Film Festival	Best Actress	Moon So-ri	Won	
2003	13th Stockholm International Film Festival	Best Cinematography	Kim Woo-hyung	Won	
2003	60th Venice International Film Festival	Golden Lion	Im Sang-soo	Nominated	
2003	11th Chunsa Film Art Awards	Best Actress	Moon So-ri	Won	
2003	2nd Korean Film Awards	Best Actress	Moon So-ri	Won	
2003	4th Busan Film Critics Awards	Best Actress	Moon So-ri	Won	
2003	4th Busan Film Critics Awards	Best Supporting Actress	Youn Yuh-jung	Won	
2003	6th Director's Cut Awards	Best Actress	Moon So-ri	Won	
2003	6th Director's Cut Awards	Best New Actor	Bong Tae-gyu	Won	
2003	24th Blue Dragon Film Awards	Best Actress	Moon So-ri	Nominated	
2003	4th Women in Film Korea Awards	Best Actress	Moon So-ri	Won	
2004	41st Grand Bell Awards	Best Film	A Good Lawyer's Wife	Nominated	
2004	41st Grand Bell Awards	Best Actress	Moon So-ri	Won	
2004	41st Grand Bell Awards	Best Supporting Actress	Youn Yuh-jung	Nominated	
2004	41st Grand Bell Awards	Best New Actor	Bong Tae-gyu	Nominated	
2004	41st Grand Bell Awards	Best Original Screenplay	Im Sang-soo	Nominated	
2004	41st Grand Bell Awards	Best Cinematography	Kim Woo-hyung	Nominated	
2004	41st Grand Bell Awards	Best Lighting	Go Nak-seon	Nominated	
2004	1st Max Movie Awards	Best Actress	Moon So-ri	Won	
2004	1st University Film Festival of Korea	Best Actress	Moon So-ri	Won	
2004	Deauville American Film Festival	Best Film	A Good Lawyer's Wife	Won	
