= The Mayor (2017 film) =

- Theatrical release poster
- Hangul: 특별시민
- Hanja: 特別市民
- RR: Teukbyeolsimin
- MR: T'ŭkpyŏlsimin
- Directed by: Park In-je
- Written by: Park In-je
- Produced by: Jeong Byeong-wuk
- Starring: Choi Min-sik; Kwak Do-won; Shim Eun-kyung; Moon So-ri; Ra Mi-ran; Ryu Hye-young; Ki Hong Lee
- Edited by: Kim Chang-ju
- Music by: Park In-young
- Production company: Palette Pictures
- Distributed by: Showbox
- Release date: April 26, 2017
- Running time: 130 minutes
- Country: South Korea
- Language: Korean
- Box office: US$9.6 million

The Mayor (Korean: 특별시민; RR: Teukbyeolsimin; lit. 'Special Citizen') is a 2017 South Korean political drama film written and directed by Park In-je, starring Choi Min-sik, Kwak Do-won, and Shim Eun-kyung. The film was released in South Korea on April 26, 2017 and in the US and Canada on April 28.

== Plot ==
Seoul's passionate and hands-on mayor, Byun Jong-gu, claims to love only the city of Seoul. However, he is often said to be a quite untruthful politician, meticulously managing his image while aiming for ultimate power.

Teaming up with Shim Hyuk-soo, a top strategist in election manipulation, and bringing in the fearless young advertising expert Park Kyung, Jong-gu sets his sights on the presidency. To pave his way, he challenges history by running for an unprecedented third term as Seoul's mayor.

But as fierce attacks from rival candidates escalate and unforeseen incidents arise, his ambitious re-election campaign faces crisis after crisis.

== Cast ==
- Choi Min-sik as Byeon Jong-gu, two-term incumbent Seoul mayor
- Kwak Do-won as Shim Hyeok-soo, Byeon's campaign manager
- Shim Eun-kyung as Park Kyeong, advertisement specialist
- Moon So-ri as Jung Jae-yi, political journalist
- Ra Mi-ran as Yang Jin-joo, Byeon's election opponent
- Ryu Hye-young as Im Min-seon, Yang's aide
- Ki Hong Lee as Steve, Yang's son
- Kim Hong-fa as Kim Nak-hyun
- Jo Han-chul as Yang Jin-Joo's campaign manager
- Jin Seon-kyu as Chauffeur
- Park Byung-eun as Byeon Jong-gu's staff
- Seo Yi-sook as Byeon Jong-gu's wife
- Lee Soo-kyung as Byun A-reum
- Kim Su-an as Yoon-hak
- Park Bo-kyung as Gil-soo's wife
- Han Da-sol as Yang Camp Media Team member
- Kim Hye-eun as TV debate host
- Park Hyuk-kwon as Gye Bong-sik
- Ma Dong-seok as Priest
- Lee Geung-young as Jeong Chi-in

== Production ==
Filming commenced on April 28, 2016 and wrapped four months later.

Writer-director Park In-je began working on the script in 2014. Park said the film was not made to focus on the dark side of political elections, but as a means to shed light on human's "unremitting desire for power". The film also marks star Choi Min-sik's second time ever to portray a politician after 1995's MBC TV series The Fourth Republic, in which he played late President Kim Dae-jung. Unlike The Fourth Republic, the character of Byeon in The Mayor was not modeled after a particular politician. Choi said: "I embodied the character by synthesizing all the images that I had about politicians… Up until [shooting the film], I had never been directly engaged in politics or met closely with politicians… After trying to think of the image of politicians, I concluded that speech is the most important skill for them. Politicians rise and fall from the words they used. So I decided to focus on having a good command of language when playing Byeon Jong-gu".

== Release ==
The Mayor was released on 1,152 screens in South Korea on April 26, 2017. It topped the box office on its opening day, with 185,776 tickets sold. During its opening weekend, it earned $6.1 million from 904,000 admissions over five days ranking first at the box office.

The film was released in the US and Canada on April 28, 2017 and was distributed by Well Go USA.

== Awards and nominations ==
Year	Award	Category	Nominee	Result
2017	54th Grand Bell Awards	Best Supporting Actor	Kwak Do-won	Nominated
2017	54th Grand Bell Awards	Best Supporting Actress	Moon So-ri	Nominated
