= Hill of Freedom =

- Directed by: Hong Sang-soo
- Written by: Hong Sang-soo
- Produced by: Kim Kyoung-hee
- Starring: Ryo Kase; Moon So-ri; Seo Young-hwa
- Cinematography: Park Hong-yeol
- Edited by: Hahm Sung-won
- Music by: Jeong Yong-jin
- Production company: Jeonwonsa Films
- Distributed by: Finecut
- Release dates: September 2, 2014 (Venice); September 4, 2014 (South Korea)
- Running time: 67 minutes
- Country: South Korea
- Languages: Korean; English; Japanese
- Box office: US$292,411

Hill of Freedom (Korean: 자유의 언덕; RR: Jayuui eondeok) is a 2014 South Korean arthouse film written and directed by Hong Sang-soo, and starring Ryo Kase, Moon So-ri, and Seo Young-hwa. It premiered in the Orizzonti ("Horizons") section of the 71st Venice International Film Festival, and won Best Film at the 34th Korean Association of Film Critics Awards and the 36th Three Continents Festival. Hill of Freedom also made The New Yorker's list of Best Undistributed Films of 2014.

== Plot ==
Japanese language teacher Mori arrives in Seoul to track down Kwon, a South Korean woman he fell for several years ago. Mori arrives in Bukchon, a neighborhood in the center of the city which has a tranquil atmosphere and historical background. Hoping for a chance to see her, he stays at a guesthouse near Kwon's old home, and he's befriended by the elderly owner, Gu-ok, and her broke but sociable nephew Sang-won. Mori begins to frequent Jiyugaoka ("Hill of Freedom"), a local coffee shop owned by Young-sun, where he writes letters to Kwon. Then even though Young-sun already has a boyfriend, she and Mori become lovers.

== Cast ==
- Ryo Kase as Mori
- Moon So-ri as Young-sun
- Seo Young-hwa as Kwon
- Kim Eui-sung as Sang-won
- Youn Yuh-jung as Gu-ok
- Gi Ju-bong as Byeong-joo
- Lee Min-woo as Ji Kwang-hyun
- Jung Eun-chae as Nam-hee
- Jeong Yong-jin as Yeom-gu
- Na Hye-jin as Employee
- Kim Min-jae as Employee

== Awards and nominations ==
Year	Award	Category	Recipient	Result
2014	34th Korean Association of Film Critics Awards	Best Film	Hill of Freedom	Won
2014	34th Korean Association of Film Critics Awards	Critics' Top 10	Hill of Freedom	Won
2014	36th Three Continents Festival	Best Film	Hill of Freedom	Won
2015	20th Chunsa Film Art Awards	Best Director (Grand Prix)	Hong Sang-soo	Nominated
2015	9th Asian Film Awards	Best Film	Hill of Freedom	Nominated
2015	9th Asian Film Awards	Best Director	Hong Sang-soo	Nominated
2015	9th Asian Film Awards	Best Actor	Ryo Kase	Nominated
2015	2nd Wildflower Film Awards	Best Director (Narrative Film)	Hong Sang-soo	Won
2015	2nd Wildflower Film Awards	Best Actor	Ryo Kase	Nominated
2015	2nd Wildflower Film Awards	Best Actress	Moon So-ri	Nominated
2015	2nd Wildflower Film Awards	Best Screenplay	Hong Sang-soo	Nominated
2015	51st Baeksang Arts Awards	Best Director	Hong Sang-soo	Nominated
2015	24th Buil Film Awards	Best Film	Hill of Freedom	Nominated
2015	24th Buil Film Awards	Best Director	Hong Sang-soo	Nominated
