= The Running Actress =

- Theatrical poster
- Hangul: 여배우는 오늘도
- Hanja: 女俳優는 오늘도
- Lit.: Today The Actress Is Still…
- RR: Yeobaeuneun oneuldo
- MR: Yŏbaeunŭn onŭldo
- Directed by: Moon So-ri
- Written by: Moon So-ri
- Produced by: Jenna Ku
- Starring: Moon So-ri
- Cinematography: Kim Ji-hyun
- Distributed by: Metaplay
- Release date: September 14, 2017
- Running time: 71 minutes
- Country: South Korea
- Language: Korean
- Box office: US$124,083

The Running Actress (Korean: 여배우는 오늘도; RR: Yeobaeuneun oneuldo) is a 2017 South Korean comedy-drama film written, directed by, and starring Moon So-ri. The feature consists of three separate short films made in the course of Moon's enrolment at Chung-Ang University.

== Cast ==
=== Main ===
- Moon So-ri as Moon So-ri

=== Act 1: The Actress ===
- Kang Sook as So-ri's friend 1
- Kim Kyung-sun as So-ri's friend 2
- Won Dong-yun as Representative
- Kim Rae-won as Representative's junior 1
- Lee Jung-ik as Representative's junior 2
- Yoon Young-kyun as Manager

=== Act 2: The Running Actress ===
- Seong Byeong-sook as So-ri's mom
- Yoon Cho-hee as Yeon-doo
- Oh Min-ae as PB team leader
- Lee Jeong-eun as Nursing team leader
- Seong Jeong-seon as Mother-in-law
- Sim Hye-gyoo as Caregiver
- Lee Jung-hyun as Lee Jung-hyun
- Lee Seung-hoon as Dental clinic director
- Gong Sang-ah as Purser
- Kim Sook-in as Producer Oh
- Kim In-soo as Film director Kim
- Jang Joon-hwan as So-ri's husband

=== Act 3: The Best Director ===
- Yoon Sang-hwa as Park Jeong-rak
- Jeon Yeo-been as Lee Seo-yeong
- Lee Seung-yeon as Director's wife
- Seo Hyo-seung as Director's son
- Na Kyung-chan as Director (picture)

== Awards and nominations ==
Awards	Category	Recipient	Result	Ref.
1st The Seoul Awards	Best Actress	Moon So-ri	Nominated	
5th Marie Claire Asia Star Awards	Special Award	Moon So-ri	Won	
38th Blue Dragon Film Awards	Best Actress	Moon So-ri	Nominated	
38th Blue Dragon Film Awards	Best New Director	Moon So-ri	Nominated	
54th Baeksang Arts Awards	Best New Director	Moon So-ri	Nominated	
23rd Chunsa Film Art Awards	Best Actress	Moon So-ri	Nominated	
27th Buil Film Awards	Best New Director	Moon So-ri	Nominated	
26th Korea Culture and Entertainment Awards	Best Actress	Moon So-ri	Won	
