= Three Sisters (2020 film) =

2020 South Korean drama film

- Theatrical release poster
- Hangul: 세자매
- Hanja: 세姊妹
- RR: Sejamae
- MR: Sejamae
- Directed by: Lee Seung-won
- Screenplay by: Lee Seung-won
- Produced by: Kim Sang-su; Moon So-ri
- Starring: Moon So-ri; Kim Sun-young; Jang Yoon-ju
- Cinematography: Cho Young-chen
- Edited by: Son yeon-ji
- Music by: Park Ki-heon
- Production company: Studio Up
- Distributed by: Little Big Pictures
- Release dates: October 2020 (BIFF); January 27, 2021 (South Korea)
- Running time: 115 minutes
- Country: South Korea
- Language: Korean
- Box office: US$384,717

Three Sisters (Korean: 세자매; RR: Sejamae) is a 2020 South Korean drama film, written and directed by Lee Seung-won. The film stars Moon So-ri, Kim Sun-young and Jang Yoon-ju as three sisters who seem to live ordinary lives, each in her own way, until memories shook everything. It had its premiere at 25th Busan International Film Festival in October 2020 and was released theatrically on January 27, 2021, in South Korea.

== Cast ==
- Moon So-ri as Mi-yeon
- Kim Sun-young as Hee-sook
- Jang Yoon-ju as Mi-ok
- Jo Han-chul as Dong-wook
- Hyun Bong-sik as Sang-joon
- Kim Ga-hee as Bo-mi
- Lim Hye-young as Hyo-jeong
- Jang Dae-woong as Seong-woon
- Lee Bong-ryun as Supermarket lady
- Cha Mi-kyung as Mother

== Release ==
Three Sisters had its premiere at 25th Busan International Film Festival in October, 2020 and was released theatrically on January 27, 2021, in South Korea.

The film was invited at 20th New York Asian Film Festival in Frontlines section. It was screened on August 18, 2021, at Lincoln Center. It was also part of 2021 Vancouver International Film Festival in 'Gateway' section, where it was first screened in October 2021. It was also screened at 10th Korean Film Festival Frankfurt on October 24, 2021.

=== Home media ===
The film was made available for streaming on IPTV (KT olleh TV, SK B TV, LG U+TV), Home Choice, Google Play, TVING, Naver TV and KakaoPage. It is also available through KT SkyLife and Cinefox platforms from February 23, 2021.

== Reception ==
=== Box office ===
The film was released on January 27, 2021, on 569 screens.

As of December 26, 2021 it is at 25th place among all the Korean films released in the year 2021, with gross of US$593,270 and 83,678 admissions.

=== Critical response ===
Panos Kotzathanasis reviewing for HanCinema praised the performance of Kim Sun-young, Moon So-ri and Jang Yoon-ju. Kotzathanasis appreciated the cinematography and in conclusion wrote, "Three Sisters communicates its messages about the consequences of trauma convincingly, while not many faults can be found neither in direction and acting, nor to the production values. The only thing that actually prevents the film from becoming great is the transition, which could have been handled much better. As a whole, however, definitely deserves a watch."

Jung Yu-jin of News 1 praising the performance said, "the three actors, Moon So-ri, Kim Seon-young, and Jang Yoon-joo, is unparalleled." Jung praised the direction saying, "the director's detailed directing ability, which portrays the universal and mundane subject of domestic violence in a sympathetic way through the lives of three sisters who seem ordinary and unusual." Rhythm Zaveri reviewing for Asian Movie Pulse appreciated the cinematography saying, "cinematography makes some interesting choices, giving each sister a distinct look with the lightning and lensing". He criticized the way transition between flash back and present, he opined, "more precise directorial vision in this matter, or even a more thought-out edit [was required]." Concluding Zaveri praised the performance of ensemble of Kim Sun-young, Moon So-ri and Jang Yoon-ju and wrote, "Outside of these small niggles, Three Sisters certainly has its merits and deserves a watch, specially to marvel at the performances from its three excellent female leads and the subtlety with which it manages to encompass complicated themes into the narrative effortlessly."

== Awards and nominations ==
Year	Award	Category	Recipient	Result	Ref(s)
2021	57th Baeksang Arts Awards	Best Actress (Film)	Moon So-ri	Nominated	
2021	57th Baeksang Arts Awards	Best Supporting Actress (Film)	Kim Sun-young	Won	
2021	57th Baeksang Arts Awards	Best New Actress – Film	Jang Yoon-ju	Nominated	
2021	15th Asian Film Awards	Best Supporting Actress	Jang Yoon-ju	Nominated	
2021	26th Chunsa Film Art Awards	Best Actress	Moon So-ri	Nominated	
2021	26th Chunsa Film Art Awards	Best Supporting Actress	Kim Sun-young	Nominated	
2021	26th Chunsa Film Art Awards	Best New Actress	Jang Yoon-ju	Nominated	
2021	30th Buil Film Awards	Best Actress	Moon So-ri	Nominated	
2021	30th Buil Film Awards	Best Supporting Actress	Kim Sun-young	Won	
2021	30th Buil Film Awards	Best Director	Lee Seung-won	Nominated	
2021	30th Buil Film Awards	Best Screenplay	Lee Seung-won	Nominated	
2021	41st Korean Association of Film Critics Awards	Best Actress	Moon So-ri	Won	
2021	41st Korean Association of Film Critics Awards	Best Supporting Actress	Kim Sun-young	Won	
2021	42nd Blue Dragon Film Awards	Best Actress	Moon So-ri	Won	
2021	42nd Blue Dragon Film Awards	Best Director	Lee Seung-won	Nominated	
2021	42nd Blue Dragon Film Awards	Best Screenplay	Lee Seung-won	Nominated	
2021	42nd Blue Dragon Film Awards	Best Supporting Actress	Kim Sun-young	Won	
2021	42nd Blue Dragon Film Awards	Best Supporting Actress	Jang Yoon-ju	Nominated	
2021	Golden Cinematography Awards	Jury's Special Award	Jang Yoon-ju	Won	
2021	8th Korean Film Writers Association Awards	Best Screenplay	Lee Seung-won	Won	
2021	8th Korean Film Writers Association Awards	Best Supporting Actress	Kim Sun-young	Won	
2021	Female Film Writer of the Year Award	Best Actor Award	Moon So-ri	Won	
2021	Busan Film Critics Awards	Best Actress	Kim Sun-young	Won	
2021	2021 Women's Film Festival	Best Actor Award	Moon So-ri	Won	
