= Hahaha =

2010 South Korean film

- Theatrical poster
- Hangul: 하하하
- RR: Hahaha
- MR: Hahaha
- Directed by: Hong Sang-soo
- Written by: Hong Sang-soo
- Produced by: Kim Kyeong-hee
- Starring: Kim Sang-kyung; Yoo Jun-sang; Moon So-ri; Ye Ji-won
- Narrated by: Kim Sang-kyung
- Cinematography: Park Hong-yeol
- Edited by: Hahm Sung-won
- Music by: Jeong Yong-jin
- Production company: Jeonwonsa Films
- Distributed by: Sponge Entertainment
- Release date: 6 May 2010
- Running time: 115 minutes
- Country: South Korea
- Language: Korean
- Box office: $371,295

Hahaha (Korean: 하하하) is a 2010 South Korean comedy-drama film written and directed by Hong Sang-soo. It was entered into the 2010 Cannes Film Festival where it won the Prix Un Certain Regard.

== Plot ==
Filmmaker Jo Moon-kyung (Kim Sang-kyung) and his friend Bang Joong-sik (Yoo Jun-sang) swap memories about the trips they both made to the same town (Tongyeong, South Gyeongsang Province), where, as it turns out, they had met and befriended the same people.

== Cast ==
- Kim Sang-kyung as Jo Moon-kyung, a film director
- Yoo Jun-sang as Bang Joong-sik, a film critic
- Moon So-ri as Wang Seong-ok, a curator of cultural properties
- Ye Ji-won as Ahn Yeon-joo, a girlfriend of Joong-sik
- Kim Kang-woo as Kang Jeong-ho, a poet
- Kim Gyu-ri as Noh Jeong-hwa
- Youn Yuh-jung as Moon-kyung's mother
- Gi Ju-bong as Curator of Tongyeong's local history museum
- Lee Kyu-sung as Beggar
- Kim Young-ho as Admiral Yi Sun-sin in Moon-kyung's dream

== Awards ==
- Un Certain Regard at the 2010 Cannes Film Festival
