= A Traveler's Needs =

2024 film by Hong Sang-soo

- Hangul: 여행자의 필요
- RR: Yeohaengjaui piryo
- MR: Yŏhaengjaŭi p'iryo
- Directed by: Hong Sang-soo
- Written by: Hong Sang-soo
- Produced by: Hong Sang-soo
- Starring: Isabelle Huppert; Lee Hye-young; Kwon Hae-hyo
- Cinematography: Hong Sang-soo
- Edited by: Hong Sang-soo
- Music by: Hong Sang-soo
- Production company: Jeonwonsa Film Company
- Release dates: 19 February 2024 (Berlinale); 24 April 2024 (South Korea); 22 November 2024 (United States)
- Running time: 90 minutes
- Country: South Korea
- Languages: English; French; Korean

A Traveler's Needs (Korean: 여행자의 필요) is a 2024 South Korean drama film written and directed by Hong Sang-soo, starring Isabelle Huppert. It is the third collaboration between the director and the star, following In Another Country and Claire's Camera.

The film had its world premiere in the Main Competition of the 74th Berlin International Film Festival, where it won the Silver Bear Grand Jury Prize.

== Premise ==
A French woman (Isabelle Huppert), who initially played a child's recorder in a park and faced financial struggles, eventually became a French teacher for two women, finding solace in lying down on rocks and relying on makgeolli for comfort.

== Cast ==
- Isabelle Huppert
- Lee Hye-young
- Kwon Hae-hyo
- Cho Yun-hee
- Ha Seong-guk
- Kim Seung-yoon

== Release ==
It was also selected in Icons at the 29th Busan International Film Festival to be screened on 4 October 2024. It has been selected for the MAMI Mumbai Film Festival 2024 under the World Cinema section.

Cinema Guild released the film in the United States on 22 November 2024.
