= 2022 New York Film Festival =

60th edition

- Opening film: White Noise
- Closing film: The Inspection
- Location: New York City, United States
- Founded: 1963
- Founded by: Richard Roud and Amos Vogel
- Hosted by: Film at Lincoln Center
- Artistic director: Dennis Lim
- Festival date: September 30 – October 16, 2022
- Website: https://www.filmlinc.org/nyff2022/

New York Film Festival
- 2023 2021

The 60th New York Film Festival took place from September 30 to October 16, 2022, in New York City, presented by Film at Lincoln Center.

Noah Baumbach's absurdist comedy-drama White Noise was selected as the "Opening Night Film" for this edition. Laura Poitras' documentary All the Beauty and the Bloodshed was chosen as NYFF's "Centerpiece Film", James Gray's drama film Armageddon Time was selected as NYFF's 60th anniversary celebration film. Elegance Bratton's drama film The Inspection was chosen as the "Closing Night Film".

All the Beauty and the Bloodshed had its world premiere at the 80th Venice International Film Festival, its North American premiere at the 49th Telluride Film Festival, its Canadian premiere at the 47th Toronto International Film Festival, making it the only movie of the 2022 season to hit all the major four fall film festivals.

Appearing in the NYFF's "Main Slate" for the first time are Charlotte Wells, Carla Simón, Shaunak Sen, Marie Kreutzer, Véréna Paravel and Lucien Castaing-Taylor, Margaret Brown, Mark Jenkin, Elegance Bratton, Davy Chou, Alice Diop, Huang Ji and Ryuji Otsuka, Laura Citarella and Cyril Schäublin.

World premieres includes Is That Black Enough for You?!? by Elvis Mitchell, She Said by Maria Schrader and Till by Chinonye Chukwu.

== Official Selection ==
=== Main Slate ===
English Title	Original Title	Director(s)	Production Country
Aftersun		Charlotte Wells	United States, United Kingdom
Alcarràs		Carla Simón	Spain, Italy
All That Breathes		Shaunak Sen	India, United States, United Kingdom
All the Beauty and the Bloodshed (centerpiece)		Laura Poitras	United States
Armageddon Time (NYFF's 60th anniversary film)		James Gray	United States
Corsage		Marie Kreutzer	Austria, France, Germany
A Couple	Un couple	Frederick Wiseman	France, United States
De Humani Corporis Fabrica		Véréna Paravel and Lucien Castaing-Taylor	France, Switzerland
Decision to Leave	헤어질 결심	Park Chan-wook	South Korea
Descendant		Margaret Brown	United States
Enys Men		Mark Jenkin	United Kingdom
EO	IO	Jerzy Skolimowski	Poland, Italy
The Eternal Daughter		Joanna Hogg	United Kingdom
The Inspection (closing film)		Elegance Bratton	United States
Master Gardener		Paul Schrader	United States
No Bears	خرس نیست	Jafar Panahi	Iran
The Novelist's Film	소설가의 영화	Hong Sang-soo	South Korea
One Fine Morning	Un beau matin	Mia Hansen-Løve	France
Pacifiction	Pacifiction – Tourment sur les îles	Albert Serra	France, Spain, Germany, Portugal
R.M.N.		Cristian Mungiu	Romania
Return to Seoul	Retour à Séoul	Davy Chou	France, Cambodia
Saint Omer		Alice Diop	France
Scarlet	L'Envol	Pietro Marcello	France, Italy, Germany, Russia
Showing Up		Kelly Reichardt	United States
Stars at Noon		Claire Denis	France
Stonewalling	石門	Huang Ji and Ryuji Otsuka	Japan
Tár		Todd Field	United States, Germany
Trenque Lauquen		Laura Citarella	Argentina, Germany
Triangle of Sadness		Ruben Östlund	Sweden, United Kingdom, United States, France, Greece
Unrest	Unrueh	Cyril Schäublin	Switzerland
Walk Up	탑	Hong Sang-soo	South Korea
White Noise (opening film)		Noah Baumbach	United States, United Kingdom

=== Spotlight ===
English Title	Original Title	Director(s)	Production Country
Bones and All		Luca Guadagnino	United States
A Cooler Climate		James Ivory and Giles Gardner	United Kingdom
Exterior Night	Esterno notte	Marco Bellocchio	Italy
Is That Black Enough for You?!?		Elvis Mitchell	United States
The Kingdom: Exodus	Riget: Exodus	Lars von Trier	Denmark
Personality Crisis: One Night Only		Martin Scorsese and David Tedeschi	United States
She Said		Maria Schrader	United States
Solaris (1972)	Солярис	Andrei Tarkovsky	Soviet Union
"Sr."		Chris Smith	United States
The Super 8 Years		Annie Ernaux and David Ernaux-Briot	France
Till		Chinonye Chukwu	United States
Women Talking		Sarah Polley	United States

=== Currents ===
English Title	Original Title	Director(s)	Production Country
The Adventures of Gigi the Law	Gigi la legge	Alessandro Comodin	Italy, France, Belgium
Coma		Bertrand Bonello	France
The Dam	Le Barrage	Ali Cherri	France, Lebanon, Sudan, Germany, Serbia, Qatar
Dry Ground Burning	Mato seco em chamas	Joana Pimenta and Adirley Queirós	Brazil, Portugal
Human Flowers of Flesh		Helena Wittmann	Germany, France
Mutzenbacher		Ruth Beckermann	Austria
Queens of the Qing Dynasty		Ashley McKenzie	Canada
Remote		Mika Rottenberg and Mahyad Tousi	United States
Rewind & Play		Alain Gomis	France, Germany
Slaughterhouses of Modernity	Schlachthäuser der Moderne	Heinz Emigholz	Germany
Tales of the Purple House	حكايات البيت الأرجواني	Abbas Fahdel	Lebanon, Iraq, France
Three Tidy Tigers Tied a Tie Tighter	Três Tigres Tristes	Gustavo Vinagre	Brazil
The Unstable Object II		Daniel Eisenberg	United States, Germany, France, Turkey
Will-o'-the-Wisp	Fogo-Fátuo	João Pedro Rodrigues	Portugal
You Have to Come and See It	Tenéis que venir a verla	Jonás Trueba	Spain

=== Shorts ===
English Title	Original Title	Director(s)	Production Country
29 Hour Long Birthday		Mark Jenkin	United Kingdom
45th Parallel		Lawrence Abu Hamdan	United Kingdom
Adaptation		Josh Kline	United States
Against Time		Ben Russell	France
Aribada		Simon(e) Jaikiriuma Paetau, Natalia Escobar	Germany, Colombia
As Time Passes		Jamil McGinnis	United States, Turkey
Bigger on the Inside		Angelo Madsen Minax	United States
The Demands of Ordinary Devotion		Eva Giolo	Belgium
Devil's Peak		Simon Liu	Hong Kong, United States
Diana, Diana		Kim Salac	United States
Exhibition		Mary Helena Clark	United States
F1ghting Looks Different 2 Me Now		Fox Maxy	United States
Fingerpicking	Diteggiatura	Riccardo Giacconi	Italy
Flora		Nicolás Pereda	Mexico
Glass Life		Sara Cwynar	Canada
If Revolution Is a Sickness		Diane Severin Nguyen	United States, Poland
In the Beginning, Woman Was the Sun		Sylvia Schedelbauer	Germany
Into the Violet Belly		Thuy-Han Nguyen-Chi	Belgium, Germany, Iceland, Malta, Denmark
It Smells Like Springtime		Mackie Mallison	United States
Lesser Choices		Courtney Stephens	United States
Life on the CAPS		Meriem Bennani	Morocco, United States
Little Jerry		Charlotte Ercoli	United States
Lungta		Alexandra Cuesta	Mexico, Ecuador
Magic Ring		Alex Ashe	United States
NE Corridor		Joshua Gen Solondz	United States
The Newest Olds		Pablo Mazzolo	Argentina, Canada
Peak Heaven Love Forever		Jordan Strafer	United States
Qualities of Life: Living in the Radiant Cold		James Richards	Germany
Quarries		Ellie Ga	United States
Remembrance: A Portrait Study		Edward Owens	United States
Renate		Ute Aurand	Germany
Same Old		Lloyd Lee Choi	Canada, United States
The Sky's in There		Dani ReStack, Sheilah ReStack	United States
The Sower of Stars	El Sembrador de estrellas	Lois Patiño	Spain
Tiger Strike Red		Sophia Al-Maria	United Kingdom
Trust Exercises		Sarah Friedland	United States
Underground Rivers	Los mayores ríos se deslizan bajo tierra	Simón Vélez	Colombia
Urban Solutions		Arne Hector, Luciana Mazeto, Minze Tummescheit and Vinícius Lopes	Germany, Brazil
Watch the Fire or Burn Inside It	Il faut regarder le feu ou brûler dedans	Caroline Poggi and Jonathan Vinel	France
What Rules the Invisible		Tiffany Sia	United States

=== Free talks ===
Section	Speakers	Notes	Ref.
The 2023 Amos Vogel Lecture	Cauleen Smith	Filmmaker and multimedia artist discussed her feature film Drylongso	
Deep Focus	Noah Baumbach	The American auteur discussed his latest film White Noise with moderator and actress Emily Mortimer	
Deep Focus	Paul Schrader	The American auteur discussed his latest film Master Gardener.	
Deep Focus	Nan Goldin	The photographer and activist talked about personal and political roots.	
Deep Focus	Park Chan-wook	The South Korean auteur discussed Decision to Leave with critic Farran Smith Nehme.	
Deep Focus	Annie Ernaux	French writer and 2022 Nobel Prize winner discussed her writing career with author Elif Batuman	
Crosscuts	Alice Diop & Frederick Wiseman	Filmmakers discussed narrative cinema, the differences between French and American cinema.	
Crosscuts	Mia Hansen-Løve & Charlotte Wells	Filmmakers discussed their films One Fine Morning and Aftersun	
Crosscuts	Joanna Hogg & Kelly Reichardt	Filmmakers discussed their films The Eternal Daughter and Showing Up.	
