= The Woman on the Beach (disambiguation) =

The Woman on the Beach is a 1947 American film starring Joan Bennett, Robert Ryan and Charles Bickford.

The Woman on the Beach may also refer to:

- Woman on the Beach, a 2006 Korean film
- "The Woman on the Beach", an episode of Magnum, P.I.
