= 2023 New York Film Festival =

61st edition

- Official festival poster by Jim Jarmusch
- Opening film: May December
- Closing film: Ferrari
- Location: New York City, United States
- Founded: 1963
- Founded by: Richard Roud and Amos Vogel
- Hosted by: Film at Lincoln Center
- Artistic director: Dennis Lim
- Festival date: September 29 – October 15, 2023
- Website: https://www.filmlinc.org/nyff2023/

New York Film Festival
- 2024 2022

The 61st New York Film Festival took place between September 29 to October 15, 2023, presented by Film at Lincoln Center.

Todd Haynes' drama May December was the opening film. Sofia Coppola's biographical drama Priscilla was the festival's Centerpiece. Michael Mann's sports drama Ferrari was the closing film.

The official "Main Slate" selection was announced on August 8, 2023. Followed by the "Spotlight Gala" section announcements on August 17, 2023. The line-up of the "Revivals" section was announced on August 22, 2023. The Currents slate was announced on August 23, 2023.

Appearing in the NYFF's "Main Slate" for the first time were Annie Baker, Bas Devos, Felipe Gálvez, Jonathan Glazer, Andrew Haigh, Raven Jackson, Michael Mann, Rodrigo Moreno, Paul B. Preciado, Wang Bing and Zhang Lü.

World premiere includes Garth Davis' Foe and Nathan Fielder's series The Curse.

== Official selections ==
=== Main Slate ===
The following films were selected to the "Main Slate" section of the Festival:

English title	Original title	Director(s)	Production country
About Dry Grasses	Kuru Otlar Üstüne	Nuri Bilge Ceylan	Turkey, France, Germany
All Dirt Roads Taste of Salt		Raven Jackson	United States
All of Us Strangers		Andrew Haigh	United Kingdom
Anatomy of a Fall	Anatomie d'une chute	Justine Triet	France
The Beast	La Bête	Bertrand Bonello	France, Canada
La chimera		Alice Rohrwacher	Italy, France, Switzerland
Close Your Eyes	Cerrar los ojos	Víctor Erice	Spain, Argentina
The Delinquents	Los delincuentes	Rodrigo Moreno	Argentina, Brazil, Chile, Luxembourg
Do Not Expect Too Much from the End of the World	Nu astepta prea mult de la sfârsitul lumii	Radu Jude	Romania
Eureka		Lisandro Alonso	Argentina, France, Germany, Portugal, Mexico
Evil Does Not Exist	悪は存在しない	Ryûsuke Hamaguchi	Japan
Fallen Leaves	Kuolleet lehdet	Aki Kaurismäki	Finland
Ferrari (closing film)		Michael Mann	United States
Green Border	Zielona Granica	Agnieszka Holland	Poland, Czech Republic, Belgium
Here		Bas Devos	Belgium
In Our Day	우리의 하루	Hong Sang-soo	South Korea
In Water	물 안에서	Hong Sang-soo	South Korea
Janet Planet		Annie Baker	United States
Kidnapped	Rapito	Marco Bellocchio	Italy, France, Germany
Last Summer	L'été dernier	Catherine Breillat	France
May December (opening film)		Todd Haynes	United States
Music		Angela Schanelec	Germany, France, Serbia
Orlando, My Political Biography	Orlando, ma biographie politique	Paul B. Preciado	France
Perfect Days		Wim Wenders	Japan, Germany
Pictures of Ghosts	Retratos Fantasmas	Kleber Mendonça Filho	Brazil
Pier Paolo Pasolini – Agnès Varda – New York – 1967 (2022) (short)		Agnès Varda	France
Poor Things		Yorgos Lanthimos	United Kingdom, Ireland, United States
The Practice	La práctica	Martín Rejtman	Argentina, Chile, Portugal
Priscilla (centerpiece)		Sofia Coppola	United States
The Settlers	Los colonos	Felipe Gálvez Haberle	Chile, Argentina, France, Denmark; United Kingdom, Taiwan, Sweden, Germany
The Shadowless Tower	白塔之光	Zhang Lü	China
Youth (Spring)	青春	Wang Bing	China, France, Luxembourg, Netherlands
The Zone of Interest		Jonathan Glazer	United Kingdom, United States, Poland

=== Spotlight ===
Film at Lincoln Center announced Maestro as the first film of the "Spotlight" section on August 16, 2023. The entire line-up was announced the following day:

English title	Original title	Director(s)	Production country
Aggro Dr1ft		Harmony Korine	United States
Bleat (2022) (short)		Yorgos Lanthimos	Greece
The Boy and the Heron	君たちはどう生きるか	Hayao Miyazaki	Japan
The Curse (episodes 1–3)		Nathan Fielder and Benny Safdie	United States
Foe		Garth Davis	Australia, United States
Going to Mars: The Nikki Giovanni Project		Joe Brewster and Michèle Stephenson	United States
Hit Man		Richard Linklater	United States
Maestro		Bradley Cooper	United States
Menus-Plaisirs – Les Troisgros		Frederick Wiseman	France, United States
Occupied City		Steve McQueen	United Kingdom, Netherlands, United States
The Pigeon Tunnel		Errol Morris	United Kingdom
Ryuichi Sakamoto: Opus		Neo Sora	Japan
Strange Way of Life (short)	Extraña Forma de Vida	Pedro Almodóvar	Spain
The Sweet East		Sean Price Williams	United States
The Taste of Things	La Passion de Dodin Bouffant	Tran Anh Hung	France

=== Currents ===
English title	Original title	Director(s)	Production country
Air Force Two		Kevin Jerome Everson	United States
ALLENSWORTH		James Benning	United States
Boyd v. Denton		Kevin Jerome Everson	United States
The Daughters of Fire	As Filhas do Fogo	Pedro Costa	Portugal
The Feeling That the Time for Doing Something Has Passed		Joanna Arnow	United States
The Human Surge 3 (opening film)	El auge del humano 3	Eduardo Williams	Argentina, Portugal, Netherlands, Taiwan, Brazil, Hong Kong, Sri Lanka, Peru
Inside the Yellow Cocoon Shell	Bên trong vỏ kén vàng	Phạm Thiên Ân	Vietnam, Singapore, France, Spain
Laberint Sequences		Blake Williams	United States
Last Things		Deborah Stratman	United States, Portugal, France
Mambar Pierrette		Rosine Mbakam	Cameroon, Belgium
Man in Black	黑衣人	Wang Bing	China, France
Mangosteen		Tulapop Saenjaroen	Thailand
The Night Visitors		Michael Gitlin	United States
Nowhere Near		Miko Revereza	United States, Philippines
A Prince	Un prince	Pierre Creton	France
Trailer of the Film That Will Never Exist: "Phony Wars"	Film Annonce du Film qui n’existera Jamais: “Drôles de Guerres”	Jean-Luc Godard	France, Switzerland, Belgium
Unhappy Hour		Ted Fendt	Germany
We Don’t Talk Like We Used To		Joshua Gen Solondz	United States, Hong Kong, Japan
When We Encounter the World		Leonardo Pirondi and Zazie Ray-Trapido	Portugal, United States

=== Currents Shorts ===
English title	Original title	Director(s)	Production country
Program 1: Surface Tension
Abattoir U.S.A.!		Aria Dean	United States
Mercurial Currents		Carolina Fusilier	Argentina, Mexico
Moving Along Image	Dau:añcut	Adam Piron	United States, Canada
Nameless Syndrome		Jeamin Cha	South Korea
Sensitive Content		Narges Kalhor	Iran, Germany
Program 2: Stranger Than Paradise
The Far and Near		Justin Jinsoo Kim	South Korea
Live From the Clouds		Mackie Mallison	United States
The Moon Will Contain Us	Solo la Luna comprenderá	Kim Torres	Costa Rica, United States
Shrooms		Jorge Jácome	Portugal
Slow Shift		Shambhavi Kaul	India, United States
Program 3: Inside Out
Bold Eagle		Whammy Alcazaren	Philippines
False Wife		Jamie Crewe	United Kingdom
Larry		Takeshi Murata and Christopher Rutledge	United States
LOOPHOLE		Jordan Strafer	United States
Sundown		Steve Reinke	Austria, Canada, United States
Program 4: Close Encounters
Disappearances		James Edmonds	Germany
If You Don’t Watch the Way You Move		Kevin Jerome Everson	United States
N’Importe Quoi (for Brunhild)		Luke Fowler	France, United Kingdom
Intersection		Richard Tuohy and Dianna Barrie	United States
Mast-Del		Maryam Tafakory	Iran, United Kingdom
Spark from a Falling Star		Ross Meckfessel	United States
Program 5: Burden of Dreams
and so it came about (A Tale of Consequential Dormancy)		Charlotte Pryce	United States
Coral		Sonia Oleniak	United States, Poland
Dildotectonica		Tomás Paula Marques	Portugal
Nocturne for a Forest		Catarina Vasconcelos	Portugal
The Rays of a Storm		Julio Hernández Cordón	Mexico
Program 6: Site Specific
The Fist		Ayo Akingbade	United Kingdom, Nigeria
Projekt		Dane Komljen	Germany, Nigeria
Ungentle		Huw Lemmey and Onyeka Igwe	United Kingdom

=== Revivals ===
Film at Lincoln Center announced the following line-up on August 22, 2023:

English title	Original title	Director(s)	Production country	Restored by
Abraham’s Valley (1993)	Vale Abrãao	Manoel de Oliveira	Portugal, France, Switzerland	Cinemateca Portuguesa – Museu do Cinema
A Dream Longer Than the Night (1976)	Un rêve plus long que la nuit	Niki de Saint Phalle	France	L’Immagine Ritrovata (Bologna-Paris)
The Dupes (1973)	المخدوعون	Tewfik Saleh	Syria	The Film Foundation’s World Cinema Project and Cineteca di Bologna in collaboration with the National Film Organization and the family of Tewfik Saleh
Emak-Bakia (1926)		Man Ray	France	Womanray and Cinenovo in partnership with La Cinémathèque française, the Centre Pompidou, the Library of Congress, the CNC and Cineteca di Bologna
Household Saints (1993)		Nancy Savoca	United States	Lightbox Film Center at University of the Arts (Philadelphia) in collaboration with Milestone Films
Les Mystères du Château de Dé (1927)		Man Ray, Jacques-André Boiffard	France	Womanray and Cinenovo in partnership with La Cinémathèque française, the Centre Pompidou, the Library of Congress, the CNC and Cineteca di Bologna
Pier Paolo Pasolini – Agnès Varda – New York – 1967 (2022)		Agnès Varda	France	Cine-Tamaris, in collaboration with L’Immagine Ritrovata
Pressure (1976)		Horace Ové	United Kingdom	BFI National Archive and The Film Foundation
Renata (1982)		Nancy Savoca	United States	Milestone Film & Video in collaboration with Ross Lipman, Corpus Fluxus
Return to Reason (1923)	Le Retour à la Raison	Man Ray	France	Womanray and Cinenovo in partnership with La Cinémathèque française, the Centre Pompidou, the Library of Congress, the CNC and Cineteca di Bologna
La Roue (1923)		Abel Gance	France	The Fondation Jérôme Seydoux-Pathé in collaboration with the Cinémathèque Française, the Cinémathèque Suisse, and Pathé and with the support of the CNC
The Starfish (1928)	L’Étoile de mer	Man Ray, Jacques-André Boiffard	France	Womanray and Cinenovo in partnership with La Cinémathèque française, the Centre Pompidou, the Library of Congress, the CNC and Cineteca di Bologna
The Stranger and the Fog (1974)	Qaribe va Meh	Bahram Beyzai	Iran	The Film Foundation’s World Cinema Project and Cineteca di Bologna in collaboration with Bahram Beyzai
The Strangler (1970)	L'Étrangleur	Paul Vecchiali	France	CNC and Cosmodigital
The Stronger (1976)		Lee Grant	United States	Academy Film Archive and The Film Foundation
Tell Me a Riddle (1980)		Lee Grant	United States	Academy Film Archive and The Film Foundation
The Woman on the Beach (1947)		Jean Renoir	United States	Library of Congress and The Film Foundation

=== Free talks ===
Section	Speakers	Notes	Ref.
The 2023 Amos Vogel Lecture	Paul B. Preciado	The writer and philosopher spoke about his debut film Orlando, My Political Biography.	
Deep Focus	Todd Haynes	Haynes debuted his short film Image Book about the production of his film May December.	
Deep Focus	Nikki Giovanni	The Poet and activist spoke about Going to Mars: The Nikki Giovanni Story.	
Deep Focus	Sandra Hüller	The German actress spoke about her latest films Anatomy of a Fall and The Zone of Interest	
Deep Focus	Catherine Breillat	The French auteur spoke about her filmography and her film Last Summer.	
Crosscuts	Wang Bing & Eduardo Williams	The two talk about their respective films, Youth (Spring) and The Human Surge 3.	
Crosscuts	Joanna Arnow & Nancy Savoca	The two discuss their careers and approach to filmmaking.	
Crosscuts	Sandra Adair & Jonathan Alberts	The two editors talk about their films Hit Man and All of Us Strangers.	
Crosscuts	Annie Baker & Raven Jackson	The two discuss their films Janet Planet and All Dirt Roads Taste of Salt.	
