= The Novelist's Film =

2022 film by Hong Sang-soo

- Theatrical release poster
- Hangul: 소설가의 영화
- Hanja: 小說家의 映畫
- RR: Soseolgaui yeonghwa
- MR: Sosŏlgaŭi yŏnghwa
- Directed by: Hong Sang-soo
- Written by: Hong Sang-soo
- Produced by: Hong Sang-soo
- Starring: Lee Hye-young; Kim Min-hee; Seo Young-hwa
- Cinematography: Hong Sang-soo
- Edited by: Hong Sang-soo
- Music by: Hong Sang-soo
- Production company: Jeonwonsa Film Co
- Distributed by: All Film Production Company; Content Panda; Finecut
- Release dates: 16 February 2022 (Berlin); 21 April 2022 (South Korea)
- Running time: 92 minutes
- Country: South Korea
- Language: Korean
- Budget: est. US$71,560

The Novelist's Film (Korean: 소설가의 영화; RR: Soseolgaui yeonghwa) is a 2022 South Korean black and white drama film written, directed, produced, photographed, scored and edited by Hong Sang-soo. The Novelist's Film, starring Lee Hye-young and Kim Min-hee, was described as the film that "celebrates the beauty of chance encounters, while talking about the importance of authenticity in the dishonest world of cinema" by the executive director Carlo Chatrian of 72nd Berlin International Film Festival, where it premiered in the competition section on February 16, 2022. It is the third consecutive year that Hong Sang-soo has been invited to the festival. The film won the Silver Bear Grand Jury Prize at the festival, which is the 4th for Sang-soo. It was released theatrically in South Korea on April 21, 2022.

== Cast ==
- Lee Hye-young as novelist Jun-hee
- Kim Min-hee as Gil-soo, actress
- Jo Yoon-hee
- Seo Young-hwa
- Kwon Hae-hyo
- Gi Ju-bong
- Park Mi-so
- Ha Seong-guk

== Production ==
The film was shot for two weeks outside Seoul in March 2021 with Lee Hye-young and Kim Min-hee as main leads. The still photos from production site were released on April 12, 2022.

== Release ==
It was the third consecutive year for the film's director Hong Sang-soo to be competing for the main awards in the competition section of the Berlin International Film Festival. His previous two films The Woman Who Ran (2020) and Introduction (2021) were selected in the competition section at the 70th and 71st editions of the festival. The film screened on February 16, 2022, at Berlinale Palast for the first time. It was also screened in Career section at Buenos Aires International Independent Film Festival held from April 19 – May 1, 2022, and Istanbul Film Festival on April 12, 2022.

The film was released theatrically in South Korea on April 21, 2022. It was screened in Masters & Auteurs section of the 46th Hong Kong International Film Festival on August 16, 2022. It also made it to Icon section of 27th Busan International Film Festival and screened on October 6, 2022.

The film was selected in main slate of 2022 New York Film Festival held from September 30 to October 16, 2022.

The film will be released in the United States by The Cinema Guild.

== Reception ==
=== Box office ===
The film was released on 66 screens on April 21, 2022.

As of August 21, 2022 it is at 49th place among all the Korean films released in the year 2022, with gross of US$71,560 and 10,492 admissions.

=== Critical response ===
On the review aggregator website Rotten Tomatoes, 100% of 26 critics' reviews are positive, with an average rating of 7.9/10. The website's consensus reads, "Hong Sang-soo reaffirms his ability to distill beauty and wisdom from the mundane in The Novelist's Film, a pure and delightful deliberation on an artist's creative process." Metacritic, which uses a weighted average, assigned the film a score of 82 out of 100, based on 10 critics, indicating "universal acclaim".

David Rooney of Hollywood Reporter wrote, that the film "conceals thoughts on the insularity of creative communities, the ticking clock of an artist's life and the importance of remaining open to finding truth even in what appear to be random connections". Concluding the review Rooney stated, "The Novelist's Film is an unapologetically slight entry, stripped back to the point where it seems to be about nothing and has nothing especially profound to say. But it's a pleasurable exercise for an artist continually in conversation with himself about the value of his work and what his collaborators bring to it. As such, Hong's 27th feature is arguably less an essential new chapter than a teasing footnote to everything he's done before." Guy Lodge reviewing for Variety opined, "The latest miniature from the prolific South Korean auteur won't rank among his most essential works, but it still offers playful pleasures aplenty." Stephanie Bunbury of Deadline wrote, "Here's another walking-and-talking film from festival favorite Hong Sang-soo, encapsulating a sliver of Korean life with his customary elusive delicacy." Concluding Bunbury stated, "the film rather than sharing a sense of completion, makes it clear that this is the flow of creative life. They [the novelist and the director] will keep working. It's what they do."

James Mottram of the South China Morning Post gave 3.5 stars out of 5 and wrote, "Hong's film is driven by gentle coincidence and good humour". Mottram opined that "those who don't have the patience for Hong's delicate brand of cinema may find The Novelist's Film frustrating, but this simply shot tale of human interaction has a beauty all of its own." Jake Cole of the Slant Magazine gave 3.5 stars out of 4 and wrote, "The Novelist's Film suggests that Hong has yet to exhaust his methods of deriving significance and beauty from the most quotidian of details, and perhaps that his strongest work is yet to come."

Dennis Schwartz graded the film as B+ and left it for the viewer "to judge if Hong Sang-soo comes up with enough here to succeed in making a film that's both enjoyable and meaningful but Schwartz found it "gentle, sincere and inspiring". Rory O'Connor of The Film Stage graded the film as B and found the dialogues "as spiky and self-reflexive as everwrote". He opined that the film is "modest, but light-hearted". Concluding, he wrote, "Hong's latest—which was made during COVID's restrictions, with plenty masks on show, and which Hong shot, edited, and even composed the score for—is ultimately a little ode to expression itself".

== Awards and nominations ==
Year	Award	Category	Recipients/ Nominees	Result	Ref.
2022	72nd Berlin International Film Festival	Silver Bear Grand Jury Prize	The Novelist's Film	Won	
2022	42nd Korean Association of Film Critics Awards	Youngpyeong Top 10 Films	The Novelist's Film	Won	
