= Jo Eun-sook =

South Korean actress (born 1970)

- Born: August 7, 1970 (age 56); South Korea
- Education: Hanyang Women's University - Creative Writing
- Occupation: Actress
- Years active: 1993–present
- Spouse: Park Deok-gyun (m. 2005)

Korean name
- Hangul: 조은숙
- Hanja: 趙銀淑
- RR: Jo Eunsuk
- MR: Cho Ŭnsuk

Jo Eun-sook (Korean: 조은숙; born August 7, 1970) is a South Korean actress. She won Best Supporting Actress from the Blue Dragon Film Awards for her portrayal of a movie ticket seller dating a failed novelist in Hong Sang-soo's directorial debut The Day a Pig Fell into the Well (1996).

== Filmography ==
=== Film ===
Year	Title	Role	Notes/Ref.
1994	Pear and Peach Flowers	Yanbian Daily reporter	
1995	The Hair Dresser	Make-up artist	
1996	The Day a Pig Fell into the Well	Min-jae	
1996	Final Blow	Sam-soon	
1997	My Father and Mother	Yeom Mi-ran	
1998	Timeless Romance	Kwan	Hong Kong film
1998	Naked Being	Eun-sook	
2000	Black Honeymoon	Jung Eun-jin	
2003	Plastic Tree	Won-young	
2004	Twentidentity		segment: "Innocence"
2005	The Windmill Palm Grove	Shim Bong-ae	
2014	Bean Sprouts	In-sook	
2022	Lovely Voice: The Beginning		Music Film
2022	Draw a Relationship		

=== Television series ===
Year	Title	Role	Notes/Ref.
1997	KBS TV Novel: "Walking on the Road with My Son"		
1997	Propose	Yoon-joo	
1997	Yesterday	Bong Jung-ah	
1997	Beautiful Crime	Kim Young-hee	
1998	Legendary Ambition	Young-joo	
1999	Hometown of Legends: "Living Tomb"	Danggolne	
2000	Golbangi	Ja-young	
2000	Three Friends	Eun-sook	
2001	Lipstick	Jo Eun-sook	
2001	MBC Best Theater: "The Story of My Fiancee"	Sun-ah	
2001	Great Friends 2	Eun-sook	
2003	Summer Scent	Oh Jang-mi	
2004	Drama City: "Unemployed and Gangster"	Young-shil	
2004	Ms. Kim's Million Dollar Quest	Han Ji-hee	
2004	Drama City: "Return Luck"	Kyung-ah	
2004	Drama City: "Rina Decides to Die"	Ri-na	
2004	Drama City: "Our Family"	Ji-soo	
2004	Drama City: "Run, Keum-joo, Run"	Keum-joo	
2005	Spring Day	Yoon-sook	
2005	KBS TV Novel: "Wind Flower"	Jo Soon-geum	
2005	Drama City: "Ask, Memory"	Song Mi-yeon	
2005	My Rosy Life	Oh Mi-ja	
2005	Drama City: "Mr. Shin's Day"	Kim Soo-jung	
2006	The 101st Proposal	Noh Jung-soon	
2007	The Innocent Woman	Jung Jin-bong	
2007	Hometown Over the Hill	Kim Seung-joo	
2008	Opojol	Myeongwol	
2008	Hometown of Legends: "Child, Let's Go to Cheong Mountain"	Danggolne	
2010	The President	Joo Il-ran	
2012	God of War	Gan Nan of Tobang kitchen	
2012	Seoyoung, My Daughter	Yoon So-mi	
2012	The Innocent Man	Kang Choco's real mother	Cameo
2013	Pots of Gold	Haeng-ja	
2013	Dream of the Emperor	Gyebaek's wife	
2014	KBS Drama Special: "The End of Summer"	Han Soo-kyung	
2015	Love on a Rooftop	Han Sun-sook	
2019	Queen: Love and War	Queen Mother Kim	
2021–2022	The All-Round Wife	Oh Poong-geum	
2021	Young Lady and Gentleman	Mi So-cheol's mistress	Cameo (Episode 2)
2023	Meant To Be	Na Jeong-im	

=== Variety show ===
Year	Title	Notes
1995	Comedy Line: Serenade of Sorrow	꽁트
2001	Family Entertainment	guest
2010	Follow to Become Rich!	Host
2011	Follow to Become Rich! Season 2	Host

== Theater ==
Year	Title	Role
1993	사주팔자를 고칩니다	
1993	My Sweet Orange Tree	
2006	You Can See Apgujeong-dong from Oksu-dong	

== Discography ==
Album information	Track listing
Mind Control Funny Diet: Album; Released: May 14, 2000; Label: Seoul Records	Track listing: 1. 다이어트 고고; 2. Good Morning; 3. D.A.N.G.E.R; 4. 그대와 Samba를; 5. 출근하는 길에서; 6. 다이어트 십계명; 7. 나를 슬프게 하는 것들; 8. 그가 내게서 돌아선 까닭은; 9. 엽기 다이어트; 10. 안녕, 나의 분신이여

== Awards and nominations ==
Year	Award	Category	Nominated work	Result
1996	17th Blue Dragon Film Awards	Best Supporting Actress	The Day a Pig Fell into the Well	Won
1997	20th Golden Cinematography Awards	Best New Actress	The Day a Pig Fell into the Well	Won
2007	KBS Drama Awards	Best Supporting Actress	Hometown Over the Hill, The Innocent Woman	Nominated
2008	KBS Drama Awards	Best Actress in a One-Act/Special/Short Drama	Child, Let's Go to Cheong Mountain	Nominated
