= Cinema Guild =

Cinema Guild may refer to:

- Category:Cinema Guild Productions films, 3 films (1941-1943) produced by Paramount Pictures and purchased by United Artists for release
- The Cinema Guild, a film distributor since 1968
