= Yourself and Yours =

2016 film by Hong Sang-soo

- Directed by: Hong Sang-soo
- Written by: Hong Sang-soo
- Produced by: Hong Sang-soo
- Starring: Kim Joo-hyuk; Lee Yoo-young
- Cinematography: Park Hong-yeol
- Edited by: Hahm Sung-won
- Music by: Dalpalan
- Production company: Jeonwonsa Film Company
- Distributed by: The Cinema Guild
- Release date: September 12, 2016
- Running time: 86 minutes
- Country: South Korea
- Language: Korean
- Box office: US$132,980

Yourself and Yours (Korean: 당신자신과 당신의 것) is a 2016 South Korean drama film directed by Hong Sang-soo. The film was screened at the 2016 Toronto International Film Festival.

== Plot ==
The plot revolves around the couple Yeong-soo (played by Kim Joo-hyuk) and Min-jeong (played by Lee Yoo-young). After a fight between them, they decide to take a break in their relationship. The next day, Min-jeong vanishes without a trace. Instead a woman shows up looking exactly like Min-jeong. She seems interested in looking for "Mr. Right" and dating every man in the town where they live. One day Min-jeong returns.

== Cast ==
- Kim Joo-hyuk as Yeong-soo
- Lee Yoo-young as Min-jeong
- Kim Eui-sung as Joong-haeng
- Kwon Hae-hyo as Jae-young

== Reception ==
On review aggregator website Rotten Tomatoes, the film has a 94% approval rating based on 32 reviews, with an average rating of 7.5/10. The site's consensus states "Yourself and Yours uses one couple's ups and downs to playfully interrogate the thrills and pitfalls of romantic relationships". On Metacritic, Yourself and Yours holds 75 out of a 100 rank based on 11 critics, indicating "generally favorable reviews".

In his review for Variety, Scott Tobias described the plot as an "inspired reversal" of the film That Obscure Object of Desire.
