= The Day a Pig Fell into the Well =

The Day a Pig Fell Into the Well
- Theatrical poster
- Hangul: 돼지가 우물에 빠진 날
- RR: Dwaejiga umure ppajin nal
- MR: Twaejiga umure ppajin nal
- Directed by: Hong Sang-soo
- Written by: Kyo Hyo-seo
- Starring: Kim Eui-sung; Lee Eung-kyung; Jo Eun-sook; Park Jin-song; Bang Eun-hee
- Cinematography: Cho Dong-kwan
- Edited by: Park Gok-ji
- Music by: Ok Kil-sung
- Release date: 15 May 1996
- Running time: 115 minutes
- Country: South Korea
- Language: Korean

The Day a Pig Fell Into the Well (Korean: 돼지가 우물에 빠진 날) is a 1996 South Korean drama film and the directorial debut of Hong Sang-soo. It stars Bang Eun-hee, Jo Eun-sook, Park Jin-song, Lee Eung-kyung and Kim Eui-sung. It was also the feature film debut of Song Kang-ho. The title derives from a 1954 book by John Cheever.

Hong earned the Best Director award at the Korean Blue Dragon Film Awards for his work as well as awards at Rotterdam and Vancouver.

== Synopsis ==
The plot focuses on the desires and lives of four characters in diverse circumstances: a poor novelist, a cheating wife, her germophobic husband, and a ticket girl.

== Bibliography ==
- Kim, Kyung-hyun (2004). "7. New Korean Cinema Auteurs: Too Early/Too Late: Temporality and Repetition in Hong Sang-su's Films: The Day a Pig Fell into the Well". The Remasculinization of Korean Cinema. Durham and London: Duke University Press. pp. 223–230. ISBN 0-8223-3267-1.
- Gateward, Frances K. (2007). Seoul searching: culture and identity in contemporary Korean cinema. New York: State University of New York Press. pp. xi, 314. ISBN 978-0-7914-7226-2. see p. 133
