= Lee Hye-young (actress, born 1962) =

South Korean actress (born 1962)

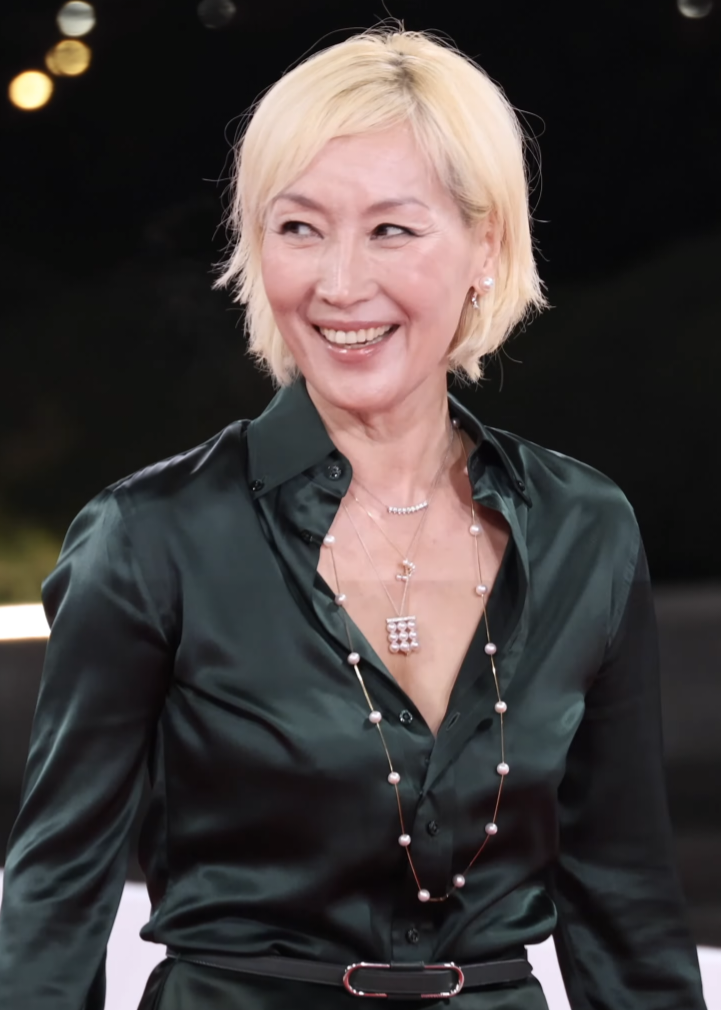
- Lee in November 2025
- Born: November 25, 1962 (age 63); Seoul, South Korea
- Education: Sunjung High School
- Occupation: Actress
- Years active: 1981–present
- Parent: Lee Man-hee (father)

Korean name
- Hangul: 이혜영
- Hanja: 李慧英
- RR: I Hyeyeong
- MR: I Hyeyŏng

Lee Hye-young (Korean: 이혜영; born November 25, 1962) is a South Korean actress. She is the daughter of celebrated film director Lee Man-hee, who died in 1975 when she was in middle school. Lee began her acting career in 1981 at the age of 18 through a local musical theatre production of The Sound of Music. Since then she has performed in theater, feature and short films, and television.

Regarded as one of the most prominent South Korean actresses in the 1980s, Lee starred in films such as The Blazing Sun (1985), Winter Wanderer (1986), Ticket (1986), The Age of Success (1988), North Korean Partisan in South Korea (1990), Fly High Run Far (1991), Passage to Buddha (1993), and No Blood No Tears (2002). Lee also played supporting roles in the Korean dramas I'm Sorry, I Love You (2004), Fashion 70's (2005) and Boys Over Flowers (2009).

== Filmography ==
=== Film ===
- The Old Woman with the Knife (2025), The film will premiere at the 75th Berlin International Film Festival in February 2025 as part of Berlinale Special programme.
- A Traveler's Needs (2024)
- Walk Up (2022)
- Anchor (2022) – So-jeong
- The Novelist's Film (2022)
- A Year-End Medley (2021)
- In Front of Your Face (2021)
- The Devil's Game (2008)
- Low Life (2004)
- No Blood No Tears (2002)
- The Hair Dresser (1995)
- Sudden Change (1994)
- Passage to Buddha (1993)
- Myong-ja Akiko Sonia (1992)
- Blood and Fire (1991)
- Fly High Run Far (1991)
- Winter Dreams Do Not Fly (1991)
- North Korean Partisan in South Korea (1990)
- Korean Connection (1990)
- The Second Sex (1989)
- The Age of Success (1988)
- A Dangerous Scent (1988)
- Sa Bangji (1988)
- The Home of Two Women (1987)
- Flower Blooms Even on a Windy Day (1987)
- The Street Musician (1987)
- Field of Honor (1986)
- Ticket (1986)
- Queen Bee (1986)
- Winter Wanderer (1986)
- The Blazing Sun (1985)
- Between the Knees (1984)
- Mrs. Kim Ma-ri (1983)
- My Mother's Wedding Ceremony (1981)

=== Television series ===
- Bitter Sweet Hell (2024) – Hong Sa-gang
- Kill Heel (2022)
- Lawless Lawyer (2018)
- Mother (2018)
- Listen to My Heart (2011)
- Boys Over Flowers (2009)
- Look Back With a Smile (2006)
- Fashion 70s (2005)
- I'm Sorry, I Love You (2004)
- And So Flows History (1989–1990)

=== Web series ===
- Big Bet (2022)

== Theater ==
- Medea (2017)
- Hedda Gabler (2012)
- Jesus Christ Superstar (2000)
- Hamlet (1999)
- The Queen of Tears (1998)
- Yeonsan, a Problematic Figure (1995)
- House (1994)
- Betrayal (1992)
- Antony and Cleopatra (1992)
- Hymn of Death (1988)
- Romeo 20 (1986)
- Snow White
- Padam Padam Padam
- Past (Josin) Peter
- Evita
- The Fantasticks
- Cabaret
- The Silence of My Beloved
- The Sound of Music (1981)

== Accolades ==
Name of the award ceremony, year presented, award category, nominated work, and the result of the nomination
Award	Year	Category	Nominated work	Result	Ref.
22nd Baeksang Arts Awards	1986	Best New Actress (Film)	Queen Bee	Won	
24th Baeksang Arts Awards	1988	Most Popular Actress (Film)	The Street Musician	Won	
25th Baeksang Arts Awards	1989	Best Actress (Film)	The Age of Success	Won	
31st Baeksang Arts Awards	1995	Best Actress in Theater	House	Won	
58th Baeksang Arts Awards	2022	Best Actress (Film)	In Front of Your Face	Won	
62nd Baeksang Arts Awards	2026	Best Actress	The Old Woman with the Knife	Nominated	
Bechdel Day	2024	Best Actress	The Old Woman with the Knife	Won	
13th Blue Dragon Film Awards	1992	Best Supporting Actress	Myong-ja Akiko Sonia	Won	
Blue Dragon Film Awards	2025	Best Actress	The Old Woman with the Knife	Nominated	
31st Buil Film Awards	2022	Best Actress	In Front of Your Face	Nominated	
23rd Busan Film Critics Awards	2022	Best Actress	In Front of Your Face	Won	
Chunsa Film Art Awards	2022	Best Actress	In Front of Your Face	Nominated	
21st Director's Cut Awards	2023	Best Actress in Television	Big Bet	Nominated	
Director's Cut Awards	2026	Best Actress (Film)	The Old Woman with the Knife	Nominated	
25th Dong-A Theatre Awards	1988	Best Actress	Hymn of Death	Won	
32nd Dong-A Theatre Awards	1996	Best Actress	Yeonsan, a Problematic Figure	Won	
49th Dong-A Theatre Awards	2013	Best Actress	Hedda Gabler	Won	
30th Grand Bell Awards	1992	Best Supporting Actress	Myong-ja Akiko Sonia	Won	
25th Grand Bell Awards	1986	Best Supporting Actress	Winter Wanderer	Won	
58th Grand Bell Awards	2022	Best Actress	In Front of Your Face	Nominated	
19th International Cinephile Society Awards	2022	Best Actress	In Front of Your Face	Won	
Korean Film Producers Association Awards	2025	Best Actress	The Old Woman with the Knife	Won	
5th Korea Theater Awards	2012	Best Actress	Hedda Gabler	Won	
11th Seoul Theater Festival	1987	Best Actress	Romeo 20	Won	
9th Wildflower Film Awards	2022	Best Actress	In Front of Your Face	Nominated	
10th Wildflower Film Awards	2023	Best Actress	The Novelist's Film	Nominated	
