= Hotel by the River =

2019 film by Hong Sang-soo

- Hangul: 강변 호텔
- Hanja: 江邊 호텔
- RR: Gangbyeon hotel
- MR: Kangbyŏn hot'el
- Directed by: Hong Sang-soo
- Written by: Hong Sang-soo
- Produced by: Hong Sang-soo; Cho Hee-young
- Starring: Gi Ju-bong; Kim Min-hee; Kwon Hae-hyo; Song Seon-mi
- Cinematography: Kim Hyung-koo
- Edited by: Son Yeon-ji
- Production company: Jeonwonsa Film
- Distributed by: The Cinema Guild
- Release dates: 9 August 2018 (Locarno); 27 March 2019 (South Korea)
- Running time: 96 minutes
- Country: South Korea
- Language: Korean
- Box office: US$45,728

Hotel by the River (Korean: 강변 호텔) is a 2018 South Korean film written and directed by Hong Sang-soo. It premiered at the 71st Locarno Film Festival.

== Plot ==
Ko Young-Hwan, a published poet, is staying at a hotel on the Han River, where he is visited by his sons Kyung-Soo and Byung-Soo, the latter of whom is a well-known film director. The two brothers have a strained, jealous relationship and argue as they wait for Young-Hwan to join them in the hotel restaurant. Young-hwan falls asleep in a different part of the restaurant and misses them.

Also staying at the hotel is A-reum, a young woman pretending to have a badly burned left hand. She is visited by a friend, Yeon-Joo, who is concerned about A-reum's reaction to a recent breakup and appears to be distraught herself. While waiting for his sons, Young-hwan approaches A-reum and Yeon-Joo as they walk around outside the hotel after a sudden snowfall, remarking repeatedly on their beauty. Yeon-Joo is a fan of his work, but the two rebuff his invitation for a drink.

Young-hwan finally sees his sons, who have been waiting for him a long time. He tells them he has been staying at the hotel for two weeks after meeting its owner while drinking. The owner, a fan of Young-hwan's poetry, lets him stay there for free. Though he enjoys the accommodations, Young-hwan tells his sons he's been feeling strange, like his death is imminent, and that this is the reason he invited them to visit. He repeatedly notes that a nearby plant needs to be watered.

Byong-Soo worries that his father wants to die, but Kyung-soo, who was older when his father left the family, insists that he's strong. Kyung-Seoul does not tell his father that he is divorced. Byong-Soo is admittedly afraid of women, having had some "bad experiences." While the brothers are outside smoking, their father disappears. He returns with two stuffed animals as gifts for his sons, which he say represent them. He says that, while they "are of two minds," he named them with the intention that they would stay side-by-side forever.

The hotel's owner asks Young-Hwan to move out of the hotel, telling him that his heart no longer trembles with respect for the poet.

A-reum and Yeon-Joo hear Byong-Soo calling for his father. Yeon-Joo recognizes Byong-Soo, though she remarks to A-reum that his films are "ambivalent" and that he is "hardly a real auteur." The two drink wine, eat cheese, and lie down next to each other in bed, chuckling at Byong-Soo's voice. When she wakes up, she tells Yeon-Joo she was dreaming of her ex, who has returned to his wife, and remarks that he thought too much about failure, which led to the end of their relationship.

Yeon-Joo admits to A-reun that she stole gloves from a car parked outside the hotel that resembles one she was driving when she had a car accident. When they look for the car again, it is gone, but they find it outside a restaurant they visit later that night. They eat at an adjacent table to Young-Hwan and his sons, who are trying to understand the hotel owner's change of heart. The conversation later grows heated over the brothers' mother, who has intense hatred for Young-Hwan.

Yeon-Joo and A-reun debate whether or not to ask for their autographs. Upon hearing their argument, Yeon-Joo remarks that men are immature and incapable of love, although she says her husband is an exception.

Young-Hwan, drunk from dinner, abruptly tells his sons he is walking back to the hotel alone and hides from them until they drive away. He returns to the restaurant and reads a new poem to Yeon-Joo and A-reun.

The next morning, Young-Hwan texts his sons telling them he enjoyed their visit and that they should go home. When they go up to his room to say goodbye, they find him dead in his bathroom. In their room down the hall, Yeon-Joo and A-reun lie next to each other in bed, crying.

== Cast ==
- Gi Ju-bong as Young-hwan
- Kim Min-hee as A-reum
- Kwon Hae-hyo as Kyung-soo
- Song Seon-mi as Yeon-joo
- Yoo Joon-sang as Byung-soo

== Release ==
Hotel by the River premiered at the 71st Locarno Film Festival on 9 August 2018.

== Reception ==
Glenn Kenny for RogerEbert.com gave the film 3 out of 4 stars.

== Awards and nominations ==
Year	Award	Category	Recipient	Result	Ref.
2018	71st Locarno Film Festival	Leopard for Best Actor	Gi Ju-bong	Won	
2019	13th Asian Film Awards	Best Supporting Actor	Kwon Hae-hyo	Nominated	
