= In Water =

2023 South Korean drama film

in water
- Korean: 물안에서
- Directed by: Hong Sang-soo
- Written by: Hong Sang-soo
- Produced by: Hong Sang-soo
- Starring: Shin Seok-ho; Ha Seong-guk; Kim Seung-yun
- Cinematography: Hong Sang-soo
- Edited by: Hong Sang-soo
- Music by: Hong Sang-soo
- Production company: Jeonwonsa Film Co
- Distributed by: Finecut; The Cinema Guild (US)
- Release dates: February 22, 2023 (Berlinale); April 12, 2023 (South Korea)
- Running time: 62 minutes
- Country: South Korea
- Language: Korean

In Water (Korean: 물안에서) is a 2023 South Korean drama film written, directed, produced, photographed, scored and edited by Hong Sang-soo.

The film had its world premiere at the Encounters section of the 73rd Berlin International Film Festival on February 22, 2023. It was theatrically released in South Korea on April 12.

== Plot ==
A director, a cinematographer, and an actress spend the days leading up to a movie shoot together on-location, waiting for the director to come up with an idea for what the film will be about.

== Cast ==
- Shin Seok-ho
- Ha Seong-guk
- Kim Seung-yun
- Kim Min-hee

== Production ==
Hong opted to shoot In Water mostly out of focus to reflect the main character's creative block. The film was written, directed, edited, and produced by Hong, with music and cinematography by Hong.

== Release ==
The film had its world premiere at the Encounters section of the 73rd Berlin International Film Festival. It also played as part of the Main Slate at the 61st New York Film Festival. The film was given a limited release in the United States by The Cinema Guild starting in December 2023.
