= Walk Up =

2022 film by Hong Sang-soo

- Official poster
- Hangul: 탑
- RR: Tap
- MR: T'ap
- Directed by: Hong Sang-soo
- Written by: Hong Sang-soo
- Produced by: Hong Sang-soo
- Starring: Kwon Hae-hyo; Lee Hye-young; Song Seon-mi
- Cinematography: Hong Sang-soo
- Edited by: Hong Sang-soo
- Music by: Hong Sang-soo
- Production company: Jeonwonsa Film Company
- Distributed by: Finecut (international); Cinema Guild (North America)
- Release dates: 11 September 2022 (TIFF); 3 November 2022 (South Korea); 24 March 2023 (United States)
- Running time: 97 minutes
- Country: South Korea
- Language: Korean
- Box office: $31,679

Walk Up (Korean: 탑; RR: Tap; lit. 'Tower') is a 2022 South Korean drama film written, directed, produced, photographed, scored and edited by Hong Sang-soo.

== Plot ==
Walk Up follows filmmaker Byung-soo and his estranged daughter Jeong-su as they visit a building owned by Ms. Kim, share a meal, and meet others who live in the building. The same event is seemingly repeated several times in different variations. Byung-soo later begins a relationship with a woman in the building and moves into one of the apartments.

== Cast ==
- Kwon Hae-hyo as Byung-soo
- Lee Hye-young as Ms. Kim
- Park Mi-so as Jeong-su
- Song Seon-mi as Sunhee
- Cho Yun-hee as Jiyoung
- Shin Seok-ho as waiter

== Production ==
Walk Up was filmed in black and white in Seoul in 2021. It was written, directed, edited, and produced by Hong, with music and cinematography by Hong. The production company was Jeonwonsa Film Company. Kim Min-hee served as production manager.

== Release ==
Walk Up premiered at the 2022 Toronto International Film Festival, where it screened out of competition. It was also shown in competition at the 70th San Sebastian International Film Festival on September 22, 2022 and premiered in the United States at the 2022 New York Film Festival. Walk Up premiered in theaters in South Korea on November 3, 2022 and in the United States on March 24, 2023.

The film is distributed internationally by Finecut and in North America by Cinema Guild.

== Reception ==
=== Critical response ===
Walk Up has received positive reviews from critics, holding a 97% positive rating on review aggregator Rotten Tomatoes based on 29 critics, with an average score of 8 out of 10, and a score of 86 on Metacritic, based on nine reviews, indicating "universal acclaim". Critics praised the film for being reflective and complex, and noted strengths in its acting, music, and tone.

=== Box office ===
Walk Up grossed $31,679 in South Korea.

=== Accolades ===
Award ceremony	Year	Category	Nominee	Result	Ref.
San Sebastián International Film Festival	2022	Golden Shell	Walk Up	Nominated	
Buil Film Awards	2023	Best Film	Walk Up	Nominated	
Buil Film Awards	2023	Best Director	Hong Sang-soo	Nominated	
