= Music (2023 film) =

2023 film by Angela Schanelec

- Official poster
- Directed by: Angela Schanelec
- Written by: Angela Schanelec
- Produced by: Kirill Krasovsky
- Starring: Aliocha Schneider; Agathe Bonitzer
- Cinematography: Ivan Marković
- Edited by: Angela Schanelec
- Production companies: Faktura film; Les Films de l’Après-Midi; dart.film
- Distributed by: Shellac; Grandfilm
- Release dates: 21 February 2023 (Berlinale); 4 May 2023 (Germany)
- Running time: 108 minutes
- Countries: Germany; France; Serbia
- Languages: Greek; English

Music is a 2023 drama film co-produced by Germany, France and Serbia, written and directed by Angela Schanelec. Starring Aliocha Schneider and Agathe Bonitzer, the film is a modern retelling of the Greek myth of Oedipus.

The film had its world premiere at the 73rd Berlin International Film Festival, in the main competition for the Golden Bear. During the festival Schanelec won the Silver Bear for Best Screenplay. The film was released in German cinemas on 4 May 2023, and in French cinemas on 8 March 2023.

== Synopsis ==
Abandoned at birth in the Greek mountains on a stormy night, Jon is taken in and adopted, without having known his father or mother.

As a young man, he meets Iro, a warden in the prison where he is incarcerated after a deadly tragic accident. She seems to seek out his presence, takes care of him, and records music for him. Jon’s eyesight begins to fail.

From then on, for every loss he suffers, he will gain something in return. Thus, in spite of going blind, he will live his life more fully than ever.

== Cast ==
- Aliocha Schneider as Jon
- Agathe Bonitzer as Iro
- Marisha Triantafyllidou as Merope
- Argyris Xafis as Elias
- Theodore Vrachas as Lucian
- Ninel Skrzypczyk as Phoebe, 14 years old
  - Frida Tarana as Phoebe, 6 years old
- Miriam Jakob as Marta
- Wolfgang Michael as Hugh

== Production ==
The film was shot from 20 August 2021 to 5 October 2021 in Berlin, Brandenburg, Uckermark and Greece.

== Release ==
Music had its premiere on 21 February 2023 as part of the 73rd Berlin International Film Festival, in Competition. It was released in France on 8 March 2023 and in German cinemas on 4 May 2023.

It was invited at the 2023 New York Film Festival in the Main Slate, and was screened on 4 October 2023. It was also invited at the 28th Busan International Film Festival in 'Icon' section and was screened on 7 October 2023. On the same day, it was also screened at 2023 BFI London Film Festival in 'Strand' section under 'Dare' theme. Later on 20 October it will be screened at the Vienna International Film Festival in Features; and at the 68th Valladolid International Film Festival in 'Official Section Feature Films (2023)' on 25 October.

It was also selected in World Focus section of the 36th Tokyo International Film Festival and was screened on 26 October 2023.

The film will have its first screening at CPH:DOX on 20 March 2024 in Parafiction section.

== Reception ==
=== Critical response ===
On the review aggregator Rotten Tomatoes website, the film has an approval rating of 86% based on 28 reviews, with an average rating of 7.3/10. On Metacritic, it has a weighted average score of 76 out of 100 based on 11 reviews, indicating "generally favorable" reviews.

Jordan Mintzer of The Hollywood Reporter calling the film "Whistles its own tune" wrote, "It’s the celebration of a vision Schanelec has meticulously honed over the past three decades, like a late sonata by a composer who has fully come into their voice." Ben Croll reviewing for IndieWire graded the film B− and wrote, "For Schanelec, every frame is a manifesto — a canvas to initially cover in layers of meaning that must then be peeled back and stripped down until nothing but the most spartan brushstrokes remain." Jessica Kiang reviewing at Berlin Film Festival, for Variety began her review with maxim "Writing about music is like dancing about architecture" as she opined that her writing has "limitations of language". She wrote, "Schanelec is unlikely to vastly expand her fanbase here, but the tiny, fervent following she has accrued over the course of now 10 fantastically intricate features may be more than ever entranced by the fertile illogic of “Music"..." To Ola Salwa reviewing for Cineuropa the thing most appealed about the film was "its meditation on fate". Concluding, Salwa wrote, "In today’s culture, where control and influence – whether real or illusionary – are fetishised, Schanelec’s vision is refreshing, even though it is always clouded one way or another." Marina Ashioti writing in Little White Lies stated, "To decipher and derive meaning from a film this dense and obtuse is a Herculean task that only becomes easier when looking at it less a standalone feature, but rather as a fascinating addition to the filmmaker’s body of work." Nicholas Bell in IonCinema.com graded the film 3/5 and wrote, "A film inherently more interesting to discuss than it is to consume, especially considering her cast was arguably invited to abstain from conveying realistic emotions, its pleasures lie in the challenge of puzzling together these details and symbols."

=== Awards and nominations ===
Award	Date of ceremony	Category	Recipient(s)	Result	Ref.
Berlin International Film Festival	25 February 2023	Golden Bear	Music	Nominated	
Berlin International Film Festival	25 February 2023	Silver Bear for Best Screenplay	Angela Schanelec	Won	
Valladolid International Film Festival	28 October 2023	Golden Spike	Music	Nominated	
Valladolid International Film Festival	28 October 2023	Best Director	Angela Schanelec	Won	
Valladolid International Film Festival	28 October 2023	Best Cinematography	Ivan Marković	Won	
