= Kim Tae-woo (actor) =

South Korean actor

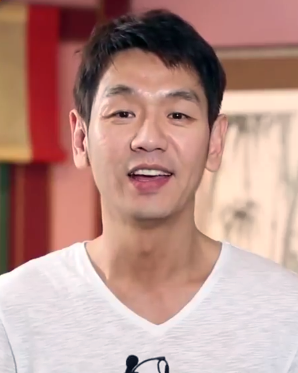
- Kim in May 2015
- Born: April 15, 1971 (age 55); Seocho-gu, Seoul, South Korea
- Education: Chung-Ang University - Theater and Film
- Occupation: Actor
- Years active: 1996–present
- Agent(s): J, Wide-Company
- Family: Kim Tae-hoon (brother)

Korean name
- Hangul: 김태우
- Hanja: 金太祐
- RR: Gim Taeu
- MR: Kim T'aeu

Kim Tae-woo (born 15 April 1971) is a South Korean actor. After his breakthrough in blockbuster war film Joint Security Area, Kim became best known for his leading roles in arthouse films, such as those directed by Hong Sang-soo, namely Woman Is the Future of Man, Woman on the Beach, and Like You Know It All.

== Career ==
In 2026, Kim had a supporting role in the fantasy romantic-comedy No Tail to Tell which aired on SBS. He played local troublemaker Jang Do-cheol who is secretly a shaman opposite Kim Hye-yoon and Lomon.

== Filmography ==
=== Film ===
Year	Title	Role	Notes/Ref.
1997	The Contact	Ge-chul	
1998	A Mystery Of The Cube	Yong-min	Main Role
2000	Joint Security Area	Nam Sung-shik	
2002	L'Abri (Bus Stop)		
2002	Saving My Hubby	Han Ju-tae	
2002	The Coast Guard	Private Seo	
2004	Woman Is the Future of Man	Kim Hyun-joon	
2004	Hypnotized	Seok-won	
2006	Don't Look Back	Sergeant Kim In-ho	
2006	Woman on the Beach	Won Chang-wook	
2006	If You Were Me 3		Main Role
2007	Epitaph	Kim Dong-won	Main Role
2007	Wide Awake	Oh Ji-hoon	
2008	Sa-kwa	Sang-hoon	
2009	The Naked Kitchen	Han Sang-in	Main Role
2009	Like You Know It All	Ku Kyeong-nam	Main Role
2010	The Influence	Choi Dong-hoon	
2010	No Doubt	No Choong-sik	Main Role
2010	A Friend in Need	Hwang Woo-jin	
2011	Quick	Junichi Watanabe	special appearance
2012	Horror Stories		special appearance
2012	The Winter of the Year Was Warm	In-sung	
2013	The Face Reader	King Munjong	
2014	Santa Barbara	Representative Jo	special appearance
2014	The Pirates	Mo Hong-gab	
2015	Casa Amor: Exclusive for Ladies	Kang Sung-gyu	
2015	Memories of the Sword	Jon Bok	
2018	Rampant	Crown Prince Lee Young	special appearance
2019	Forbidden Dream	Jung Nam-son	
2024	Project Silence	Jung Hyun-baek	

=== Television series ===
Year	Title	Role	Notes/Ref.
1996	Hometown of Legends "Eunjangdo"		
1996	First Love	Hyung-ki	
1997	Mr. Right	Song Jeong-hwan	Main Role
1998	Lie	Jang Uh	
1999	Should My Tears Show	Cho Soo-hyun	Main Role
1999–2000	8 Love Story	Young-suk	Main Role, Ep.8 "Host of Memory"
2000	Virtue	Park Yeong-gook	
2001	Blue Mist	Kim Min-kyu	Main Role
2001	Legend	Kang Dae-woong	Main Role
2002	That Woman Catches People	Oh Cheon-soo	Main Role
2008	Tokyo Sun Shower	Jeong Hyeon-su	Main Role
2010	Big Thing	Min-kyu	special appearance, Ep. 1
2010	Quiz of God	Jae-suk	special appearance, Ep. 1
2012	Dummy Mommy	Park Jung-do	
2013	That Winter, the Wind Blows	Jo Moo-chul	
2014	God's Gift: 14 Days	Han Ji-hoon	Main Role
2015	The Jingbirok: A Memoir of Imjin War	King Seonjo	Main Role
2016	Goodbye Mr. Black	Kim Ji-ryun	
2016	The Good Wife	Choi Sang-il	
2017	Black	Grim Reaper No.444	special appearance
2018	Queen of Mystery 2	Ha Ji-seung	
2018	Secret Mother	Han Jae-yeol	Main Role
2019	Romance Is a Bonus Book	CEO Kim Jae-min	
2019	The Banker	Lee Hae-gon	Main Role
2019	The Tale of Nokdu	Heo Yoon	
2020	The Spies Who Loved Me	Ban Jin-min	
2020	Awaken	Oh Jung-hwan	
2020–2021	Mr. Queen	Kim Jwa-geun	
2021	Bossam: Steal the Fate	King Gwanghae	
2022	Cleaning Up	Jin Seong-woo	
2022	Bad Prosecutor	Kim Tae-ho	
2022–2023	Missing: The Other Side 2	Noh Yoon-gu	special appearance
2023	Twinkling Watermelon	Yoon Geon-hyung	
2024	Love Song for Illusion	Sajo Seung	
2025	Mary Kills People	An tae-sung	

=== Music video appearances ===
- "Seesaw" (Hot Potato, 2010)
- "Late Regrets" (Bobo, 2001)

== Theater ==
- The Blue Room (2011)
- The Seagull (2008)

== Awards ==
- 2015 KBS Drama Awards: Excellence Award, Actor in a Serial Drama (The Jingbirok: A Memoir of Imjin War)
- 2006 Busan Film Critics Awards: Best Supporting Actor (Woman on the Beach)
- 2002 SBS Drama Awards: Excellence Award, Actor in a Serial Drama (That Woman Catches People)
- 2001 Golden Cinematography Awards: Best New Actor (Joint Security Area)
- 1998 KBS Drama Awards: Best New Actor (Lie)
