= Like You Know It All =

- Theatrical release poster
- Hangul: 잘 알지도 못하면서
- RR: Jal aljido mothamyeonseo
- MR: Chal aljido mothamyŏnsŏ
- Directed by: Hong Sang-soo
- Written by: Hong Sang-soo
- Produced by: Hong Yi-yeon-jeong
- Starring: Kim Tae-woo; Go Hyun-jung; Uhm Ji-won
- Cinematography: Kim Hoon-kwang
- Edited by: Hahm Sung-won
- Music by: Jeong Yong-jin
- Production company: Jeonwonsa Films
- Distributed by: Sponge Entertainment
- Release date: May 14, 2009
- Running time: 126 minutes
- Country: South Korea
- Language: Korean
- Budget: $100,000
- Box office: $208,867

Like You Know It All (Korean: 잘 알지도 못하면서; RR: jal aljido mothamyeonseo; lit. 'You Think You Know It All But You Don't') is a 2009 South Korean comedy-drama film written and directed by Hong Sang-soo.

== Plot ==
Arthouse filmmaker Goo can't seem to direct a hit, but at least the critics love him. He goes to Jecheon, North Chungcheong Province to judge the local film festival, but the common practice for jurors is to schmooze by day, drink at night, and sleep through movies. He bumps into an old friend Boo Sang-yong in town and drinks till he passes out, but not before soundly offending his friend's wife.

After Jecheon, Goo heads to Jeju Island to give a college lecture. There, he meets up with a former mentor, who it turns out is now married to Goo's ex-unrequited lover.

== Cast ==
- Kim Tae-woo as Goo Kyeong-nam, a film director

=== In Jecheon ===
- Uhm Ji-won as Gong Hyeon-hee, a programmer of the film festival
- Gong Hyung-jin as Boo Sang-yong, Kyeong-nam's ex-business partner
- Jung Yu-mi as Yoo Shin, Sang-yong's wife
- Seo Yeong-hwa as Oh Jin-sook, an actress and jury member for the film festival
- Eun Joo-hee as Oh Jeong-hee, a porn actress
- Kim Yeon-soo as a box office hitting film director
- Michael Rodgers as film critic 'Robert'

=== In Jeju ===
- Go Hyun-jung as Go Soon, Cheon-soo's wife and Goo's ex-unrequited lover
- Ha Jung-woo as Mr. Cho, a sculptor and Cheon-soo's neighbor
- Moon Chang-gil as Yang Cheon-soo, a painter and Kyeong-nam's college senior
- Yoo Jun-sang as Mr. Go, a chief officer of Jeju Film Commission
- Go Chang-gyoon as an officer of Jeju Film Commission
- Ye Soo-jung as Mother of actress

== Production ==
Like You Know It All is Hong's second film to be shot on HD video following his previous feature Night and Day, released in 2008. The film was produced independently with a short shooting period and low budget of $100,000, with the cast — some of whom have appeared in Hong's earlier films — working without any fees upfront. Shooting commenced in Jecheon, August 2008, where the real-life Jecheon International Music & Film Festival is held annually, before moving to Jeju Island, where filming continued into September.

A member of the main production staff said, "the film steps away from the sharp beauty of cinematic form, trying to make some changes while being more loose in form but more dynamic in atmosphere. It is more hilarious but also bitter at the same time."

YesAsia said, "Hong's characteristic episodic narrative and elliptical reflection provide the brooding framework for a bitingly funny send-up of filmmakers, festivals, and the people and places in between."
