= Silver Bear for Best Screenplay =

Award presented annually by the Berlin International Film Festival

- Silberner Bär/Bestes Drehbuch (German)
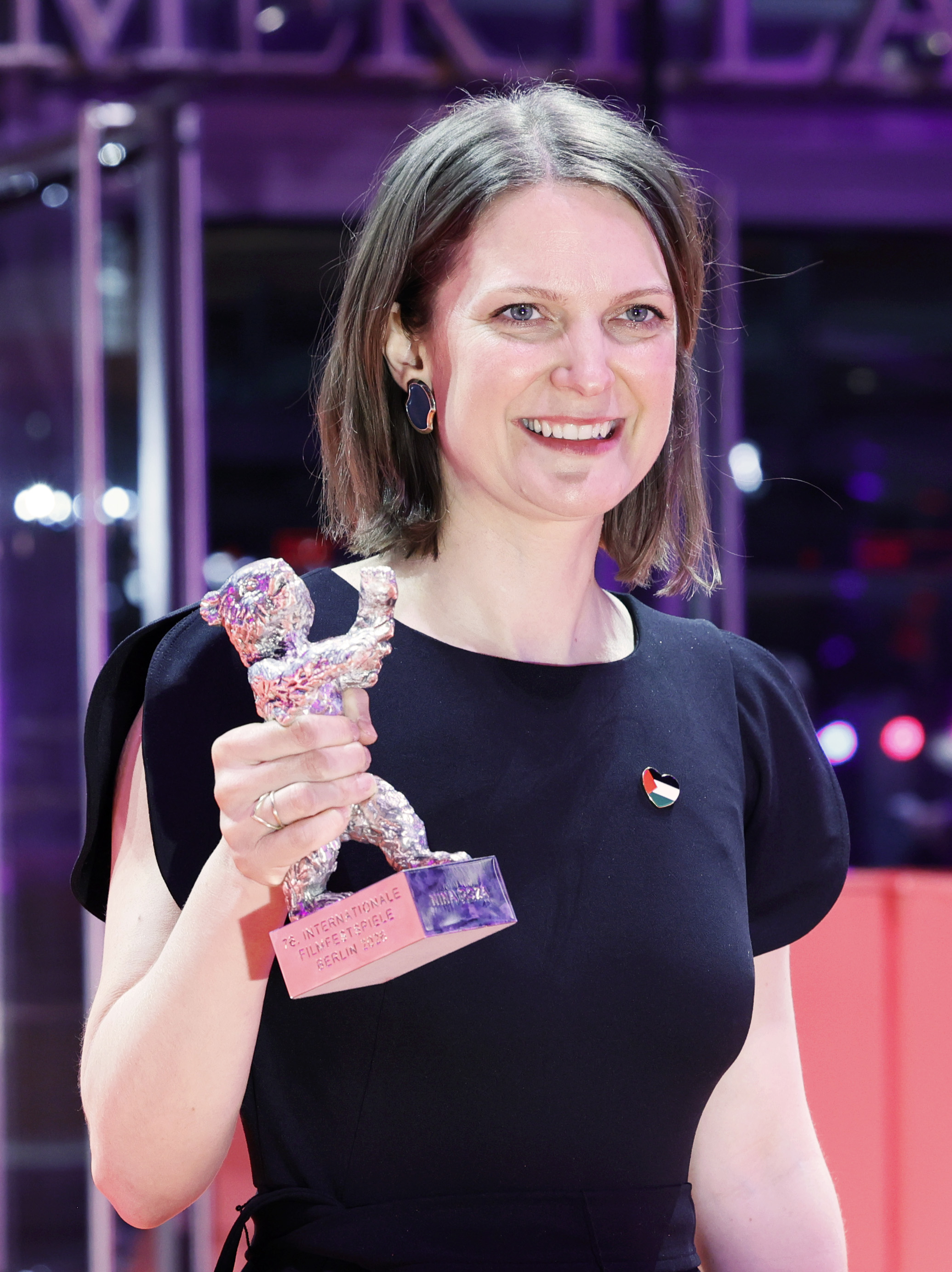
- 2026 recipient: Geneviève Dulude-De Celles
- Awarded for: Best screenwriting by screenwriter
- Country: Germany
- Presented by: Berlin International Film Festival
- First award: 2008
- Currently held by: Geneviève Dulude-De Celles for Nina Roza (2026)
- Website: www.berlinale.de

The Silver Bear for Best Screenplay (German: Silberner Bär/Bestes Drehbuch) is the Berlin International Film Festival's award for achievement in Screenwriting.

== History ==
Chinese filmmaker Wang Xiaoshuai was the first winner for In Love We Trust (2008). Canadian filmmaker Geneviève Dulude-De Celles is the most recent winner for Nina Roza (2026).

== Winners ==
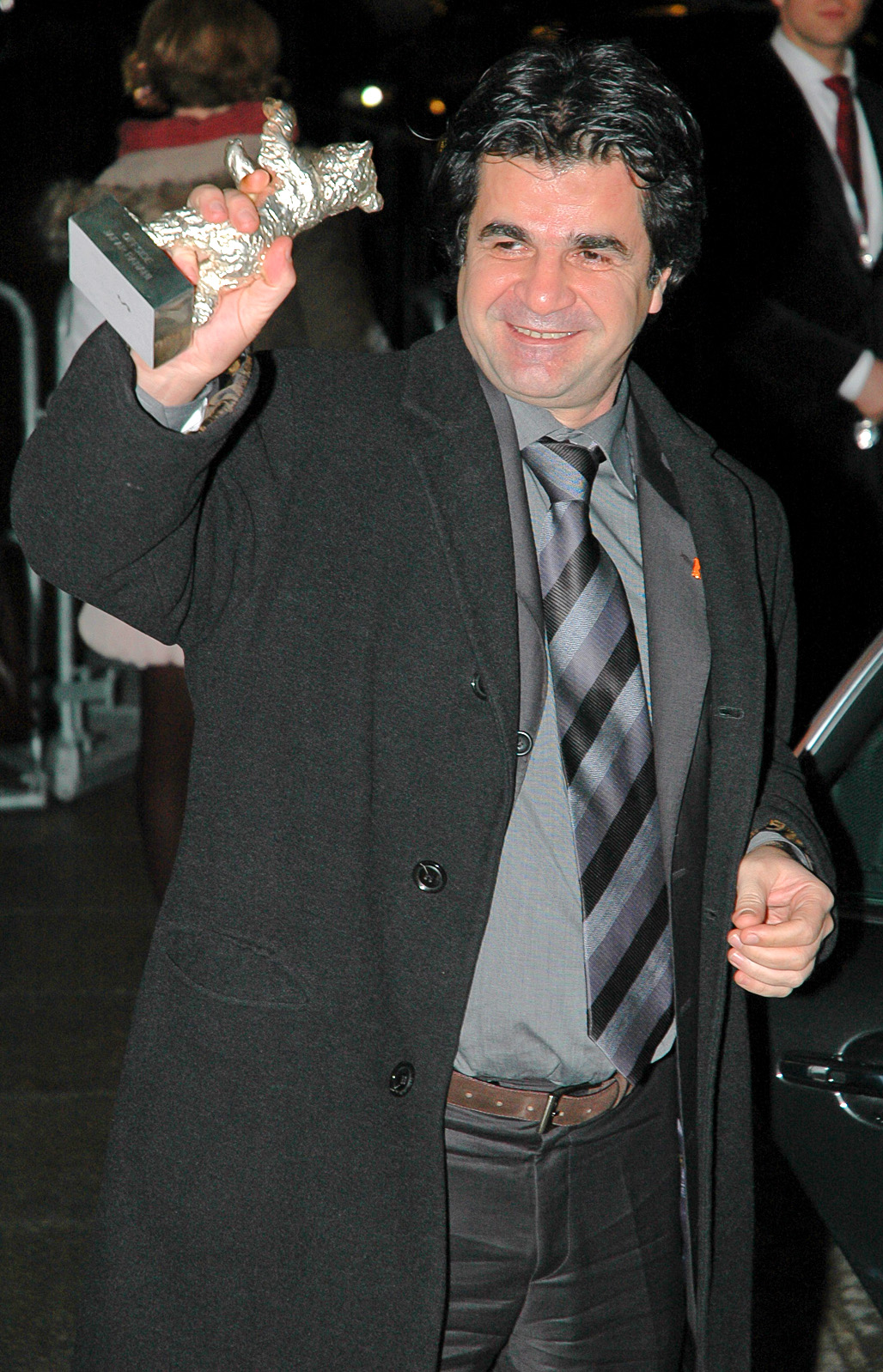
Jafar Panahi won for Closed Curtain (2013)

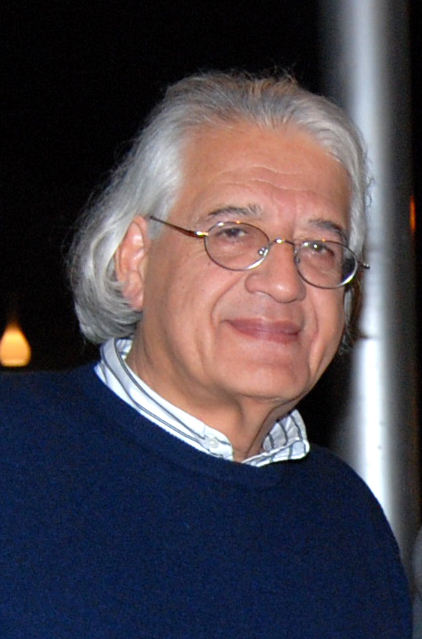
Patricio Guzmán won for The Pearl Button (2015)

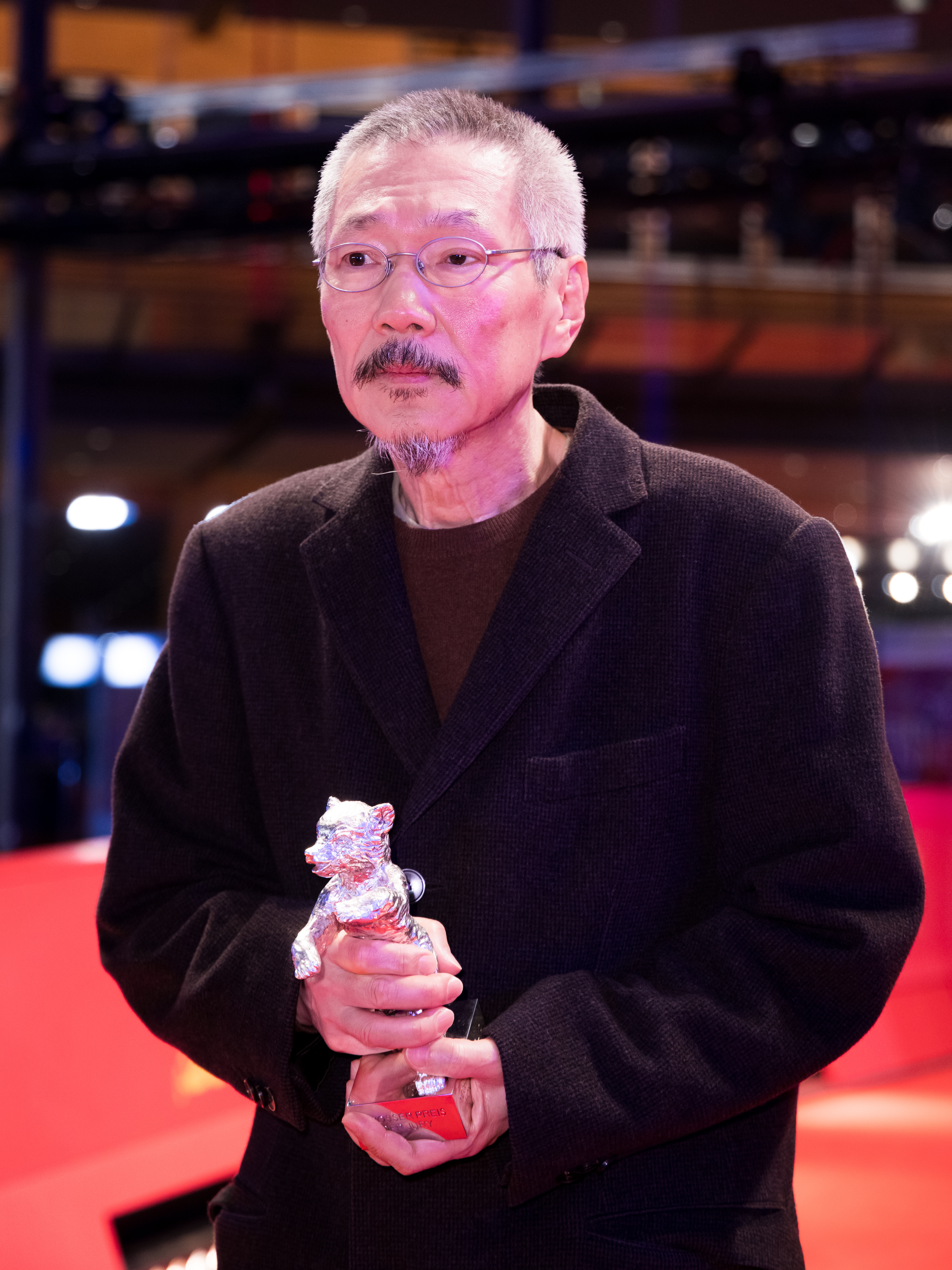
Hong Sang-soo won for Introduction (2021)

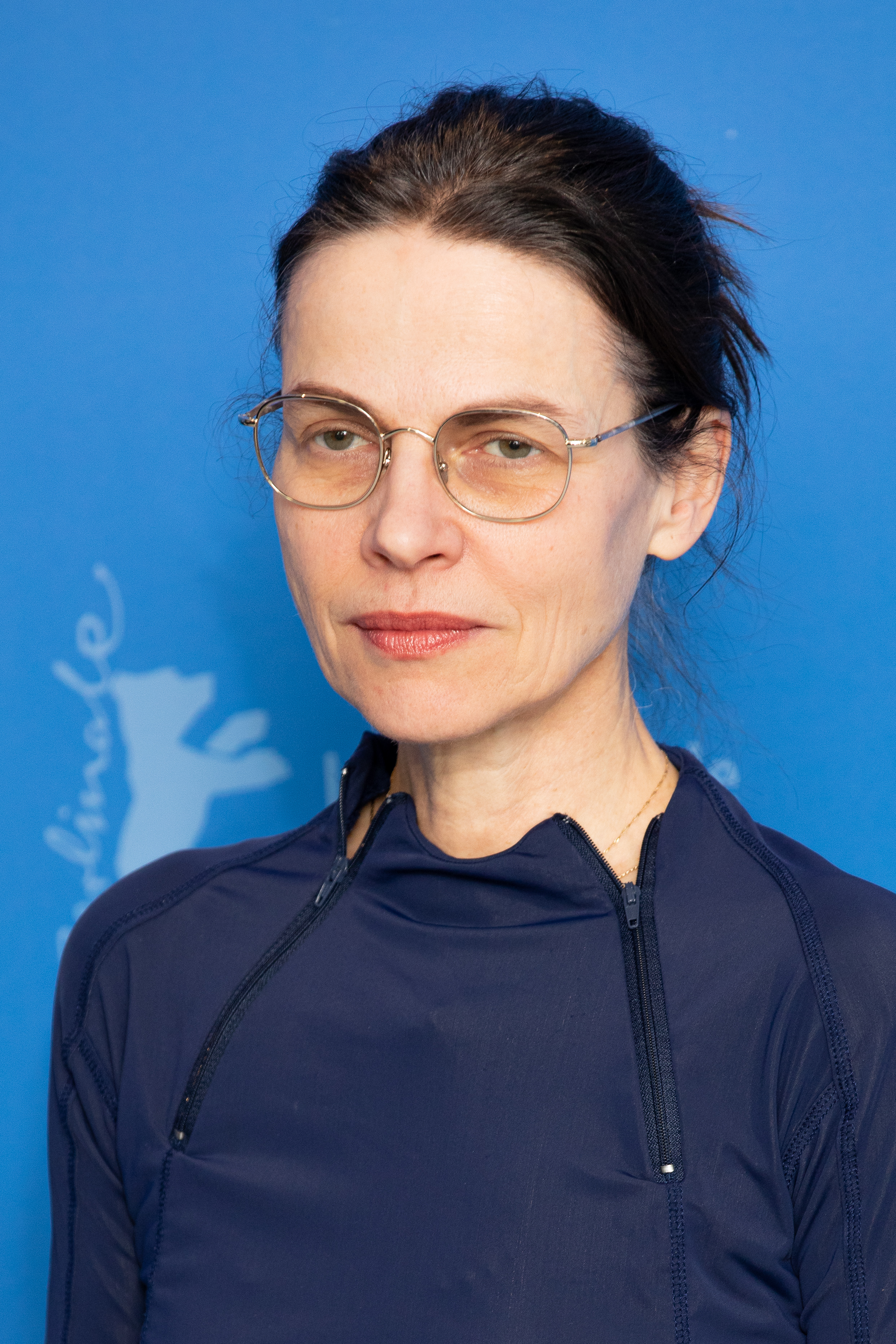
Angela Schanelec won for Music (2023)

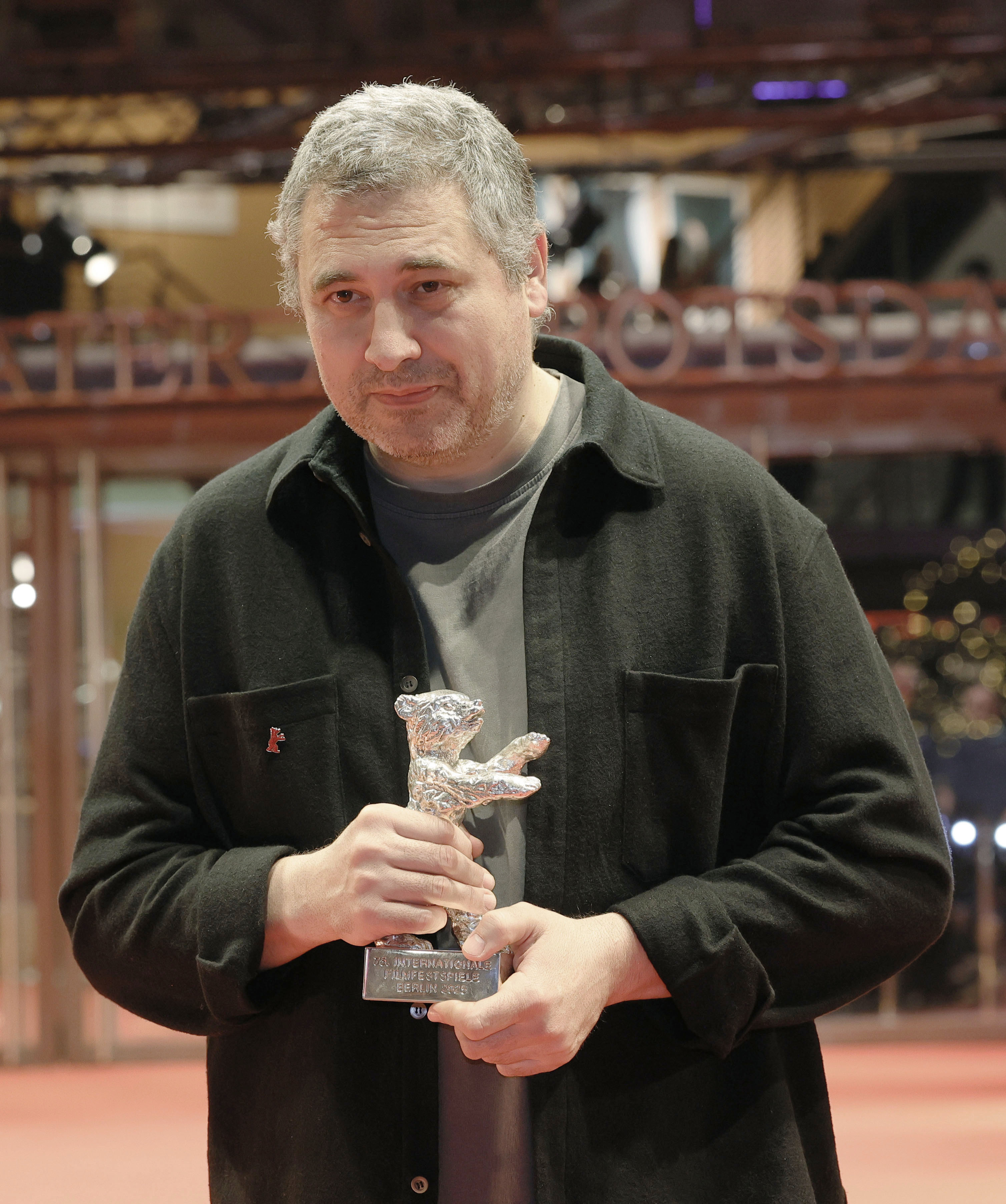
Radu Jude won for Kontinental '25 (2025)

=== 2000s ===
Year	Screenwriter(s)	English title	Original title	Ref.
2008 (58th)	Wang Xiaoshuai	In Love We Trust	左右	
2009 (59th)	Oren Moverman and Alessandro Camon	The Messenger		

=== 2010s ===
Year	Screenwriter(s)	English title	Original title	Ref.
2010 (60th)	Wang Quan'an and Jin Na	Apart Together	团圆	
2011 (61st)	Joshua Marston and Andamion Murataj	The Forgiveness of Blood	Falja e Gjakut	
2012 (62nd)	Nikolaj Arcel and Rasmus Heisterberg	A Royal Affair	En kongelig affære	
2013 (63rd)	Jafar Panahi	Closed Curtain	پرده	
2014 (64th)	Dietrich Brüggemann and Anna Brüggemann	Stations of the Cross	Kreuzweg	
2015 (65th)	Patricio Guzmán	The Pearl Button	El botón de nácar	
2016 (66th)	Tomasz Wasilewski	United States of Love	Zjednoczone Stany Miłości	
2017 (67th)	Sebastián Lelio and Gonzalo Maza	A Fantastic Woman	Una mujer fantástica	
2018 (68th)	Manuel Alcalá and Alonso Ruizpalacios	Museum	Museo	
2019 (69th)	Maurizio Braucci, Claudio Giovannesi and Roberto Saviano	Piranhas	La paranza dei bambini	

=== 2020s ===
Year	Screenwriter(s)	English title	Original title	Ref.
2020 (70th)	Damiano and Fabio D'Innocenzo	Bad Tales	Favolacce	
2021 (71st)	Hong Sang-soo	Introduction	인트로덕션	
2022 (72nd)	Laila Stieler	Rabiye Kurnaz vs. George W. Bush	Rabiye Kurnaz gegen George W. Bush	
2023 (73rd)	Angela Schanelec	Music		
2024 (74th)	Matthias Glasner	Dying	Sterben	
2025 (75th)	Radu Jude	Kontinental '25		
2026 (76th)	Geneviève Dulude-De Celles	Nina Roza		

== See also ==
- Cannes Film Festival Award for Best Screenplay
- Venice Film Festival Award for Best Screenplay
