= The Day She Returns =

2026 drama film by Hong Sang-soo

- Theatrical release poster
- Hangul: 그녀가 돌아온 날
- RR: Geunyeoga doraon nal
- MR: Kŭnyŏga toraon nal
- Directed by: Hong Sang-soo
- Written by: Hong Sang-soo
- Produced by: Hong Sang-soo
- Starring: Song Seon-mi; Cho Yunhee; Park Mi-so
- Cinematography: Hong Sang-soo
- Edited by: Hong Sang-soo
- Music by: Hong Sang-soo
- Production company: Jeonwonsa Film Company
- Distributed by: Jeonwonsa Film Company; NEW Contents Panda
- Release date: 18 February 2026 (Berlinale)
- Running time: 84 minutes
- Country: South Korea
- Language: Korean

The Day She Returns (Korean: 그녀가 돌아온 날) is a 2026 South Korean black-and-white experimental film written, produced, edited, composed, shot and directed by Hong Sang-soo. It stars Song Seon-mi, Cho Yunhee and Park Mi-so.

The film had its world premiere at the Panorama section of the 76th Berlin International Film Festival on 18 February 2026.

== Synopsis ==
She has just finished the shoot of an independent film and now has to give three interviews about it. Afterwards, in her acting class, her teacher asks her to reenact the interviews. But for some reason, she is unable to remember them.

== Cast ==
- Song Seon-mi as Bae Jeongsu
- Cho Yun-hee as Kim Young
- Park Mi-so as Park Junhee
- Kim Seon-jin
- Oh Yun-su
- Kang So-yi
- Ha Seong-guk
- Shin Seok-ho

== Release ==
The film had its world premiere at the Panorama section of the 76th Berlin International Film Festival on 18 February 2026. It had its North American premiere in the Main Slate of the 2026 New York Film Festival.
