= In Our Day =

- Theatrical release poster
- Korean: 우리의 하루
- Directed by: Hong Sang-soo
- Written by: Hong Sang-soo
- Produced by: Hong Sang-soo
- Starring: Ki Joobong; Kim Min-hee; Song Sunmi; Park Miso; Ha Seongguk; Kim Seungyun
- Cinematography: Hong Sang-soo
- Edited by: Hong Sang-soo
- Music by: Hong Sang-soo
- Production company: Jeonwonsa Film Company
- Release dates: May 25, 2023 (Cannes); October 19, 2023 (South Korea)
- Running time: 84 minutes
- Country: South Korea
- Language: Korean

In Our Day (Korean: 우리의 하루) is a 2023 South Korean drama film, and the 30th feature film written and directed by Hong Sang-soo, who also produced, photographed, scored and edited the film.

The film had its world premiere at the Directors' Fortnight section of the 2023 Cannes Film Festival on May 25. It was theatrically released in South Korea on October 19.

== Plot ==
Recently returned to South Korea, an actress in her forties is staying with her friend and her cat. Meanwhile, an aging poet in declining health lives alone after the death of his own cat. One day, each receives a visit from a different young aspiring artist, who come equipped with questions about their careers and life itself.

== Cast ==
- Ki Joobong as Uiju
- Kim Min-hee as Sangwon
- Song Sunmi as Jungsoo
- Park Miso as Jisoo
- Ha Seongguk as Jaewon
- Kim Seungyun as Kijoo

== Production ==
The film was produced by the Jeonwonsa Film Company, and was shot in Seoul in 2022.

== Release ==
In Our Day premiered at the Directors Fortnight main selection of the 2023 Cannes Film Festival, on May 25. It was also shown at the Main Slate section of the 2023 New York Film Festival, alongside Hong's other 2023 film feature, In Water.
