= Introduction (film) =

2021 South Korean film

- Release poster
- Hangul: 인트로덕션
- RR: Inteurodeoksyeon
- MR: Int'ŭrodŏksyŏn
- Directed by: Hong Sang-soo
- Written by: Hong Sang-soo
- Produced by: Hong Sang-soo
- Starring: Shin Seok-ho; Park Mi-so; Kim Young-ho; Ye Ji-won; Gi Ju-bong; Seo Young-hwa; Kim Min-hee; Cho Yun-hee
- Cinematography: Hong Sang-soo
- Edited by: Hong Sang-soo
- Music by: Hong Sang-soo
- Production company: Jeonwonsa Film Co.
- Distributed by: The Cinema Guild (United States)
- Release dates: March 2021 (Berlinale); May 27, 2021 (South Korea)
- Running time: 66 minutes
- Country: South Korea
- Language: Korean
- Box office: est. US46,559

Introduction (Korean: 인트로덕션; RR: Inteurodeoksyeon) is a 2021 South Korean drama film written, directed, produced, photographed, scored and edited by Hong Sang-soo. The film stars Shin Seok-ho, Park Mi-so and Kim Min-hee.

The film had its worldwide premiere at the 71st Berlin International Film Festival in March 2021, where it won the Silver Bear for Best Screenplay. It was released theatrically in South Korea on May 27, 2021.

== Plot ==
Section 1 Opening scenes enter Youngho (Shin Seokho) seeing off his girlfriend before going into a waiting room of a traditional Korean doctor's offices where a famous actor (Ki Joobong) has dropped by unexpectedly. In conversation with the nurse(Ye Ji-won) we learn Youngho is there to see his father not an appointment but his request.

Section 2 The location shifts to Juwon (Park Miso), a student who has come to Berlin with her mother(Yun-hee Cho) to study fashion, there she meets an artist (Kim Minhee) who is an old friend of her mother's, and who will put Juwon up at her apartment until she finds her own place. Juwon leaves them to meet up with her boyfriend Youngho on a surprise visit who hopes to get money from his father to study in Germany with her.

Section 3 Two years later, back in Korea, Youngho, who traveled to Berlin for a visit in part 2, goes to seaside restaurant with his pal at his mother's (Cho Yunhee) request to meet the famous actor (Ki Joobong) who is a friend of his mother's. The old actor who was also acquainted with Youngho's now estranged doctor father (Kim Youngho) — recalled from the opening scenes set in the doctor's offices where the actor had dropped by, postponing Youngho's own mysterious meeting with his father and having inspired Youngho to become an actor as well. The meal is interrupted by a dispute about Youngho's leaving acting. On the beach he has an imagined encounter with Juwon before awakening in the car and going for a swim.

== Cast ==
The cast include:

- Shin Seokho as Youngho
- Park Miso as Juwon
- Kim Young-ho as Father
- Gi Ju-bong
- Joo-Bong Ki as Old Actor
- Young-hwa Seo as Juwon's Mother
- Kim Min-hee as Painter
- Cho Yoon-hee as Youngho's Mother
- Ji-won Ye as Nurse
- Ha Seongguk as Youngho's Friend Jeongsoo

== Release ==
On February 11, 2021, Berlinale announced that the film would have its worldwide premiere at the 71st Berlin International Film Festival in the Berlinale Competition section, in March 2021.

The film was selected for screening in 'View of the World' category at 11th Beijing International Film Festival held from 21 to 29 September 2021. It is also selected for screening in 'Icon' category at 26th Busan International Film Festival held from 6 to 15 October 2021.

== Reception ==
Introduction was ranked eighth on Cahiers du Cinéma's top 10 films of 2022 list.

== Awards and nominations ==
Year	Award	Category	Recipients/ Nominees	Result	Ref(s)
2021	71st Berlin International Film Festival	Silver Bear for Best Screenplay	Hong Sang-soo	Won	
2021	30th Buil Film Awards	Best Film	Introduction	Nominated	
2021	30th Buil Film Awards	Best New Actor	Shin Seok-ho	Nominated	
