= Claire's Camera =

2017 film by Hong Sang-soo

- Theatrical release poster
- French: La caméra de Claire
- Directed by: Hong Sang-soo
- Written by: Hong Sang-soo
- Produced by: Hong Sang-soo
- Starring: Isabelle Huppert; Kim Min-hee
- Cinematography: Lee Jin-keun
- Edited by: Hahm Sung-won
- Music by: Dalpalan
- Production companies: Jeonwonsa Film Co.; Les Films du Camélia
- Distributed by: Jour2Fête (France); Contents Panda (South Korea)
- Release dates: 21 May 2017 (Cannes); 7 March 2018 (France); 25 April 2018 (South Korea)
- Running time: 69 minutes
- Countries: South Korea; France
- Languages: English; French; Korean
- Budget: $100,000
- Box office: $191,980

Claire's Camera (French: La caméra de Claire) is a 2017 drama film written, produced, and directed by Hong Sang-soo and starring Isabelle Huppert and Kim Min-hee. The film had its world premiere in the Special Screening section of the Cannes Film Festival on 21 May 2017. It was released in France on 7 March 2018 and in South Korean on 25 April 2018.

== Plot ==
While working for a Korean film distribution company at the Cannes Film Festival, Jeon Man-hee is pressured to quit her job after her boss, Nam Yang-hye, tells her that she no longer trusts Man-hee, refusing to elaborate on why she feels this way. In fact, the firing took place because she had sex with director So Wan-soo during the festival. Man-hee decides to remain in Cannes for the time being.

Claire, a Parisian music teacher who has travelled to Cannes with a friend to attend a screening of the latter's film, has a chance encounter with So at a café. She brings him to a local library and teaches him to recite a French poem. Although not a professional artist, Claire is an avid photographer who takes photos with her instant camera. While at dinner with So and Yang-hye, she shares her photos, including a photo she took earlier the same day of Man-hee. So and Yang-hye are confused at the circumstances of the photo, particularly why Man-hee is wearing more makeup than usual. After Claire has left, it is revealed that So and Yang-hye have a romantic relationship, possibly contributing to Man-hee's firing. So ends the relationship, claiming that he wants to ensure that their business relationship is not jeopardized.

Later, Claire meets Man-hee after taking her photo at the beach. During their conversation, Claire mentions that she has never eaten Korean food; Man-hee offers to cook for her. Man-hee brings Claire back to the apartment hotel she is staying at with her co-workers, where they share a meal prepared by her roommate. Claire discusses her encounter with So and Yang-hye, leading Man-hee to understand the circumstances of her dismissal.

Man-hee runs into So on the terrace of a hotel, whereupon he accuses her of seeking male attention by wearing short shorts. Shortly afterwards, Claire, who is also there, takes a photo of Man-hee, further upsetting her. Man-hee later brings Claire to the café where her firing took place. Claire takes a photo of Man-hee, telling her that she takes photos because the only way to change things is to "look at everything again, very slowly". Claire tells Man-hee about the death of her boyfriend months prior. Man-hee receives a text message from Yang-hye, who is waiting outside Man-hee's place to talk to her. While their conversation is not depicted, Man-hee is seen back at work taping boxes.

== Cast ==
- Isabelle Huppert as Claire
- Kim Min-hee as Jeon Man-hee
- Chang Mi-hee as Nam Yang-hye
- Jung Jin-young as So Wan-soo
- Yoon Hee-sun as Sung-yeon
- Lee Wan-min
- Kang Tae-woo as Jung-woo
- Shahira Fahmy as Claire's friend
- Mark Peranson as man on terrace

== Production ==
In May 2016, it was announced that Isabelle Huppert, Kim Min-hee, Jung Jin-young and Chang Mi-hee had joined the cast of the film, with Hong Sang-soo directing the film. It was shot during the 2016 Cannes Film Festival.

== Release ==
Claire's Camera had its world premiere in the Special Screening section of the Cannes Film Festival on 21 May 2017. The film was released theatrically in France on 7 March 2018 by Jour2Fête and in South Korean on 25 April 2018 by Contents Panda. In August 2017, Cinema Guild acquired US distribution rights to the film. It opened at New York City's Film Society of Lincoln Center on 9 March 2018 and in select cities on 23 March.

== Reception ==
=== Critical response ===
On the review aggregator website Rotten Tomatoes, the film holds an approval rating of 89% based on 56 reviews, with an average rating of 7.5/10. The website's critics consensus reads, "Claire's Camera adds another deceptively unassuming entry to writer-director Hong Sang-soo's oeuvre – one whose lingering impact belies its brief length." Metacritic, which uses a weighted average, assigned the film a score of 80 out of 100, based on 15 critics, indicating "generally favorable" reviews.

=== Accolades ===
Awards	Category	Recipient	Result	Ref.
27th Buil Film Awards	Best Film	Claire's Camera	Nominated	

== See also ==
- Isabelle Huppert on screen and stage
