= Tale of Cinema =

- Theatrical poster
- Hangul: 극장전
- Hanja: 劇場前
- RR: Geukjangjeon
- MR: Kŭkchangjŏn
- Directed by: Hong Sang-soo
- Written by: Hong Sang-soo
- Produced by: Marin Karmitz; Hong Sang-soo
- Starring: Kim Sang-kyung; Uhm Ji-won; Lee Ki-woo
- Cinematography: Hyung-Ku Kim; Young-rho Kim
- Edited by: Sung-Won Hamm
- Music by: Yong-Jing Yeong
- Release date: 26 May 2005
- Running time: 89 minutes
- Country: South Korea
- Language: Korean

Tale of Cinema is the sixth film by South Korean director Hong Sang-soo. It was entered into the 2005 Cannes Film Festival.

== Plot ==
As the film begins, Sangwon, an aimless and indecisive college student on school holiday after final examinations, avoids walking together with his older brother by instead taking a side street, where he finds a former girlfriend, Yongsil, working at an optician's store. Unsure of his own emotional preparedness in rekindling the relationship, he decides to watch a play while waiting for her to complete her work shift, delaying the decision to meet her later in the evening. The final words of anguish in the play, uttered by a desperately ill child unable to be comforted by his mother, would later be echoed by Sangwon from the rooftop of his parents' apartment after his own failed act of despair. In the film's corollary chapter, Tongsu, a struggling, rootless, and inscrutable filmmaker who has become obsessed with a short film directed by his former classmate - and in particular, the devoted and obliging woman in the film - encounters the young actress in person and begins to ingratiate himself into her company, acting out his projected image of her by imitating gestures and revisiting locations from the film in an attempt to realize his own created image of her.

== Cast ==
- Kim Sang-kyung as Kim Dong-soo
- Lee Ki-woo as Jeon Sang-won
- Uhm Ji-won as Choi Young-shil
- Lee Kyung-jin as Sang-won's mother

== See also ==
- List of Korean-language films
