= Woman on the Beach =

- Theatrical poster
- Hangul: 해변의 여인
- Hanja: 海邊의 女人
- RR: Haebyeonui yeoin
- MR: Haebyŏnŭi yŏin
- Directed by: Hong Sang-soo
- Written by: Hong Sang-soo
- Produced by: Oh Jung-wan
- Starring: Kim Seung-woo; Go Hyun-jung; Song Seon-mi; Kim Tae-woo
- Cinematography: Kim Hyung-koo
- Edited by: Hahm Sung-won
- Music by: Jeong Yong-jin
- Production company: BOM Film Productions
- Distributed by: Mirovision
- Release date: 31 August 2006
- Running time: 127 minutes
- Country: South Korea
- Language: Korean
- Box office: $749,147

Woman on the Beach is the seventh feature film by South Korean director Hong Sang-soo, and was released in 2006.

== Plot ==
Film director and screenwriter Kim Jung-rae asks his friend Won Chang-wook to drive with him from their homes in Seoul to the resort town of Shinduri, on the western coast of South Korea. Chang-wook initially resists, but accepts the request on the condition that he can bring Kim Mun-suk, a composer and aspiring singer whom he describes as being his girlfriend. Jung-rae is writing a treatment for a film titled "About Miracles," concerning the mysterious connections that secure everyday life—themes that play a major role in the work of Hong Sang-Soo.

During the journey, Mun-suk quickly makes clear that she does not consider herself Chang-wook's girlfriend, and she finds herself and Jung-rae increasing drawn together. As the three drive on, Mun-suk discusses her years living abroad in Germany and reveals that she has had a number of relationships with Europeans, a fact that greatly disturbs both Chang-wook and Jung-rae. Mun-suk is particularly disappointed in Jung-rae's reaction, claiming, "You're not like your films." Nevertheless, Mun-suk and Jung-rae later kiss on the beach and then sleep together in a low-rent hotel room. The next day, as the three drive back to Seoul, Jung-rae pulls back from his intimacy with Mun-suk.

He returns to the beach alone two days later. Missing Mun-suk despite his actions, Jung-rae hits on two women, one of whom vaguely resembles Mun-suk, by introducing himself as a film director and asking to interview them for his screenplay. Jung-rae proceeds to seduce Choi Sun-hee in much the same fashion as he had Mun-suk just a few days prior. While sleeping with one of the women, Sun-hee, in the same beachside motel where he'd been with Mun-suk, Jung-rae is surprised to find that Mun-suk has returned to Shinduri, found his room, and started banging on the door loudly and very late at night. Jung-rae sneaks Sun-hee out of his room through a separate exit.

The next morning as Mun-suk sleeps at the foot of his door with a terrible hangover. Jung-rae attempts to reconcile with Mun-suk and lies about his night with Sun-hee, although his lie is increasingly transparent to all concerned. Having alienated Mun-suk and left Sun-hee without a goodbye, Jung-rae returns to Seoul with a creative breakthrough on his screenplay.

== Cast ==
- Kim Seung-woo as Director Kim Jung-rae
- Go Hyun-jung as Kim Mun-suk
- Song Seon-mi as Choi Sun-hee
- Kim Tae-woo as Won Chang-wook
- Moon Sung-keun as (voice)
- Jung Chan as Guy driving Mun-suk home
- Lee Ki-woo as Beach resort caretaker
- Oh Tae-kyung as Waiter at empty sushi restaurant
- Choi Ban-ya as Sun-hee's friend

== Release ==
Woman on the Beach was released in South Korea on August 31, 2006, and received a total of 225,388 admissions nationwide.

== Reception ==
Woman on the Beach has an 87% approval rating on Rotten Tomatoes, and a 72/100 average on Metacritic.

== Awards and nominations ==
2006 Busan Film Critics Awards

- Best Supporting Actor - Kim Tae-woo
- Best New Actress - Go Hyun-jung

2006 Korean Film Awards

- Nomination - Best Actress - Go Hyun-jung
- Nomination - Best Director - Hong Sang-soo
- Nomination - Best Cinematography - Kim Hyung-koo
- Nomination - Best New Actress - Go Hyun-jung

2006 Director's Cut Awards

- Best Director - Hong Sang-soo

2007 Asian Film Awards

- Nomination - Best Director - Hong Sang-soo
- Nomination - Best Screenplay - Hong Sang-soo
- Nomination - Best Music - Jeong Yong-jin

2007 Baeksang Arts Awards

- Nomination - Best New Actress - Go Hyun-jung

2007 Grand Bell Awards

- Nomination - Best New Actress - Go Hyun-jung
