= The Cinema Guild =

Independent film producer

- Industry: Film distribution
- Founded: 1968; 58 years ago
- Founder: Philip Hobel; Mary-Ann Hobel
- Headquarters: New York City, U.S.
- Products: Motion pictures, DVDs, Blu-rays
- Website: http://www.cinemaguild.com

The Cinema Guild Inc. is an American film distribution company. It was established by Philip Hobel and Mary-Ann Hobel, producers known for their work in documentaries and features, including the film Tender Mercies.

Since 1968, the Cinema Guild has been a distributor of both documentary and fiction films (narrative features and shorts), offering distribution in all markets, including educational, non-theatrical, theatrical, television, cable, internet, and home video.

The Cinema Guild launched its own home video brand in March 2009. The company released its first Blu-ray, Marwencol, in 2011.

Internationally acclaimed filmmakers who have released films through the Cinema Guild include Claire Denis, Jacques Rivette, Agnès Varda, Pedro Costa, Béla Tarr, Hong Sang-soo, Alexander Sokurov, Nuri Bilge Ceylan, and Kazik Radwanski.

The distributor has also worked with such U.S.-based independent filmmakers as Andrew Bujalski, Jem Cohen, Paul Devlin, and Matthew Porterfield.

== Releases ==
- 24 City (Jia Zhangke, 2008)
- 35 Shots of Rum (Claire Denis, 2008)
- The Beaches of Agnès (Agnès Varda, 2008)
- Jerichow (Christian Petzold, 2008)
- The Order of Myths (Margaret Brown, 2008)
- Our Beloved Month of August (Miguel Gomes, 2008)
- Shirin (Abbas Kiarostami, 2008)
- Around a Small Mountain (Jacques Rivette, 2009)
- Beeswax (Andrew Bujalski, 2009)
- The Betrayal (Ellen Kuras, 2009)
- Change Nothing (Pedro Costa, 2009)
- Everyone Else (Maren Ade, 2009)
- Sweetgrass (Lucien Castaing-Taylor and Ilisa Barbash, 2009)
- Aurora (Cristi Puiu, 2010)
- Marwencol (Jeff Malmberg, 2010)
- Putty Hill (Matthew Porterfield, 2010)
- The Strange Case of Angelica (Manoel de Oliveira, 2010)
- The Day He Arrives (Hong Sang-soo, 2011)
- Once Upon a Time in Anatolia (Nuri Bilge Ceylan, 2011)
- Patience (After Sebald) (Grant Gee, 2011)
- The Turin Horse (Béla Tarr and Ágnes Hranitzky, 2011)
- Two Years at Sea (Ben Rivers, 2011)
- Planet of Snail (Yi Seung Jun, 2012)
- Neighboring Sounds (Kleber Mendonça Filho, 2012)
- Step Up to the Plate (Paul Lacoste, 2012)
- The Law in These Parts (Ra’anan Alexandrowicz, 2012)
- Night Across the Street (Raúl Ruiz, 2012)
- Leviathan (Lucien Castaing-Taylor and Verena Paravel, 2012)
- Free Voice of Labor: The Jewish Anarchists (Steven Fischler and Joel Sucher, 1980)
- Andre Gregory: Before and After Dinner (Cindy Kleine, 2013)
- Museum Hours (Jem Cohen, 2012)
- Viola (Matías Piñeiro, 2013)
- The Last Time I Saw Macao (João Pedro Rodrigues and João Rui Guerra da Mata, 2013)
- Cousin Jules (Dominique Benicheti, 2013)
- Manakamana (Stephanie Spray, Pacho Velez, 2013)
- What Now? Remind Me (Joaquim Pinto, 2013)
- Norte, the End of History (Lav Diaz, 2013)
- Stray Dogs (Tsai Ming-liang, 2013)
- Actress (Robert Greene, 2014)
- Los Angeles Plays Itself (Thom Andersen, 2014)
- Maidan (Sergei Loznitsa, 2014)
- When Evening Falls on Bucharest or Metabolism (Corneliu Porumboiu, 2015)
- Jauja (Lisandro Alonso, 2015)
- Because I Was a Painter (Christophe Cognet, 2015)
- About Elly (Asghar Farhadi, 2015)
- The Princess of France (Matías Piñeiro, 2015)
- Horse Money (Pedro Costa, 2015)
- Counting (Jem Cohen, 2015)
- Starless Dreams (Mehrdad Oskouei, 2017)
- In Pursuit of Silence (Patrick Shen, 2017)
- The Wrong Light (Josie Swantek Heitz and Dave Adams, 2017)
- The Death of Louis XIV (Albert Serra, 2017)
- 4 Days in France (Jérôme Reybaud, 2017)
- On the Beach at Night Alone (Hong Sang-soo, 2017)
- Western (Valeska Grisebach, 2017)
- El Mar La Mar (Joshua Bonnetta & J.P. Sniadecki, 2017)
- Claire's Camera (Hong Sangsoo, 2017)
- The Day After (Hong Sangsoo, 2017)
- En el Séptimo Día (On the Seventh Day) (Jim McKay, 2018)
- Hale County This Morning, This Evening (RaMell Ross, 2018)
- The Wild Pear Tree (Nuri Bilge Ceylan, 2019)
- Hotel by the River (Hong Sangsoo, 2019)
- Suburban Birds (Qiu Sheng, 2019)
- Grass (Hong Sangsoo, 2018)
- The Wandering Soap Opera (Raul Ruiz, 2019)
- End of the Century (Lucio Castro, 2019)
- I'm Leaving Now (Lindsey Cordero & Armando Croda, 2019)
- Chinese Portrait (Wang Xiaoshuai, 2019)
- I Was at Home, But... (Angela Schanelec, 2020)
- Liberté (Albert Serra, 2020)
- Yourself and Yours (Hong Sangsoo, 2020)
- Sunless Shadows (Mehrdad Oskouei, 2020)
- Ghost Tropic (Bas Devos, 2020)
- Film About a Father Who (Lynne Sachs, 2020)
- Un Film Dramatique (Éric Baudelaire, 2020)
- Swimming Out Till the Sea Turns Blue (Jia Zhangke, 2020)
- The Woman Who Ran (Hong Sangsoo, 2021)
- 499 (Rodrigo Reyes, 2021)
- Isabella (Matías Piñeiro, 2021)
- Anne at 13,000 ft. (Kazik Radwanski, 2021)
- The Two Sights (Joshua Bonnetta, 2021)
- Expedition Content (Ernst Karel and Veronika Kusumaryati, 2021)
- So Dear, So Lovely (Diana Allan, 2021)
- Introduction (Hong Sang-soo, 2021)
- A Night of Knowing Nothing (Payal Kapadia, 2021)
- Rock Bottom Riser (Fern Silva, 2017)
- The Girl and the Spider (Ramon Zürcher and Silvan Zürcher, 2021)
- In Front of Your Face (Hong Sang-soo, 2021)
- Cane Fire (Anthony Banua-Simon, 2021)
- I Am A Town (Mischa Richter, 2021)
- Dos Estaciones (Juan Pablo González, 2022)
- The Novelist's Film (Hong Sang-soo, 2022)
- Walk Up (Hong Sang-soo, 2022)
- Human Flowers Of Flesh (Helena Wittmann, 2022)
- In Our Day (Hong Sang-soo, 2023)
- Last Things (Deborah Stratman, 2023)
- Richland (Irene Lusztig, 2023)
- The Tuba Thieves (Alison O'Daniel, 2024)
