= The Power of Kangwon Province =

- Theatrical poster
- Hangul: 강원도의 힘
- Hanja: 江原道의 힘
- RR: Gangwon-doui him
- MR: Kangwŏn-doŭi him
- Directed by: Hong Sang-soo
- Written by: Hong Sang-soo
- Starring: Baek Jong-hak; Oh Yoon-hong
- Release date: 4 April 1998
- Running time: 108 minutes
- Country: South Korea
- Language: Korean

The Power of Kangwon Province (Korean: 강원도의 힘) is the second film by South Korean director Hong Sang-soo. It follows the lives of a man and a woman who have decided to end their affair. It was screened in the Un Certain Regard section at the 1998 Cannes Film Festival.

== Plot ==
Three young girls, Jisook, Misun and Eunkyoung take a trip to the mountainous Kangwon Province of South Korea. Jisook has just broken up with another married man, and she is lonely and unhappy with her current situation. They meet a young policeman who shows them around and after a meal where they all get drunk together, Jisook ends up passing out with the policeman in her bed, but not having sex. He is married, but Jisook returns another day to see him and they end up falling-over drunk again.

The second half the film then follows the situation of Sangwon, the married man that Jisook has just broken up with. In a typically symmetrical fashion, after a repeat scene where it becomes apparent that both of them are on the same train, Sangwon also visits the Kangwon Province with a friend and the paths of the two characters cross without them ever meeting there, both of them encountering a couple involved in a murder investigation.

== Reception ==
Critics gave positive reviews to the film. Manohla Dargis of The New York Times called the film "etched with precision" and "one of the best films you can see this year". Richard Brody of The New Yorker praised it as a "coolly bracing drama" and wrote that Hong filmed the story "as a romantic travelogue". Time Out described the film as "complex in structure and subtler in effect", calling it "virtuoso film-making".

=== Awards and nominations ===
At the 36th Grand Bell Awards in 1999, The Power of Kangwon Province was nominated for Best Film and Best Director for Hong Sang-soo. It was the only Hong Sang-soo's work that has won a Grand Bell Award Best Film nomination. The film also won Best New Technology for Kim Yeong-cheol.

== See also ==
- List of Korean-language films
