= Hong Sang-soo =

South Korean film director (born 1960)

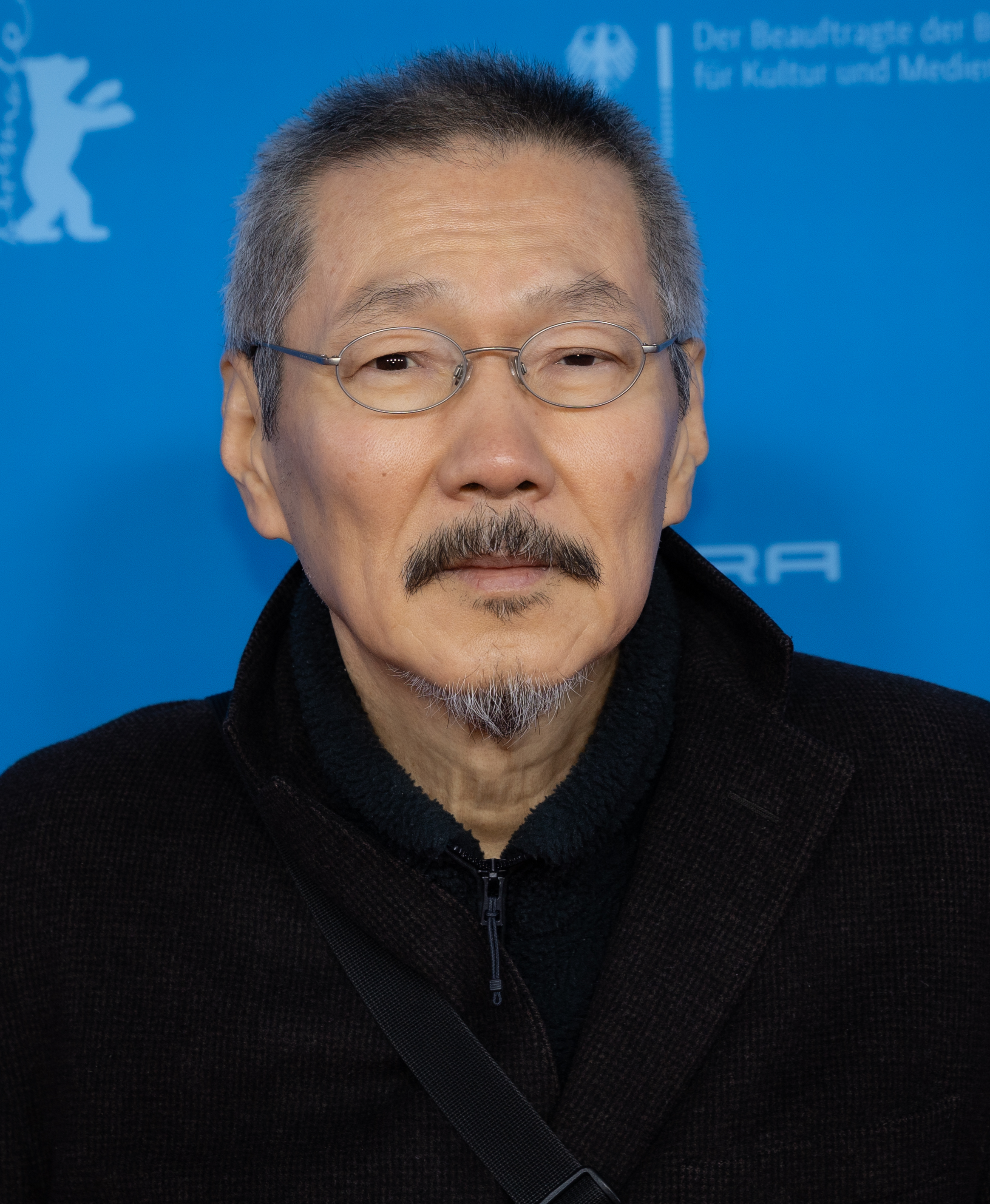
- Hong at the 2026 Berlin Film Festival
- Born: 25 October 1960 (age 66); Seoul, South Korea
- Education: Chung-Ang University; California College of the Arts; School of the Art Institute of Chicago
- Occupations: Film director; screenwriter
- Years active: 1996–present
- Spouse: Unnamed (m. 1985; sep. 2015)
- Partner: Kim Min-hee (2015–present)
- Children: 2

Korean name
- Hangul: 홍상수
- Hanja: 洪常秀
- RR: Hong Sangsu
- MR: Hong Sangsu
- IPA: [ɸʷo̞ŋ sʰa̠ŋ.sʰu]

Hong Sang-soo (Korean: 홍상수; born 25 October 1960) is a South Korean film director and screenwriter. His films often deal in love affairs and everyday dilemmas in contemporary South Korea. His work has been widely-acclaimed and received numerous international accolades.

== Early life and education ==
Hong's parents owned the film production company Cinetel Soul. Hong took the entrance exam and entered the theater department at Chung-Ang University. He then studied in the United States, where he received his bachelor's degree from the California College of Arts and Crafts and his master's at the School of the Art Institute of Chicago.

== Career ==
Hong made his directorial debut in 1996 with The Day a Pig Fell into the Well. Woman is the Future of Man (2004) was his first film to screen in the main competition at the Cannes Film Festival. Hong's films have also screened in the main competition of the Berlin International Film Festival, the Venice Film Festival, and the Locarno Film Festival. They are also regularly screened in non-competitive festivals, such as the New York Film Festival and the Toronto International Film Festival.

Hong received the Prix Un Certain Regard at the 2010 Cannes Film Festival for Hahaha. In 2013, he won the Silver Leopard Award for Best Director for Our Sunhi, and, in 2015, the Golden Leopard for Right Now, Wrong Then, both at the Locarno Film Festival. Most recently, his 2020 film The Woman Who Ran won the Silver Bear for Best Director at the 70th Berlin International Film Festival, Introduction won the Silver Bear for Best Screenplay, The Novelist's Film (2022) won the Silver Bear Grand Jury Prize at the 72nd Berlin International Film Festival, and A Traveler's Needs (2024) won the Silver Bear Grand Jury Prize at the 74th Berlin International Film Festival.

In June 2018, Hong was invited to become a member of the Academy of Motion Picture Arts and Sciences.

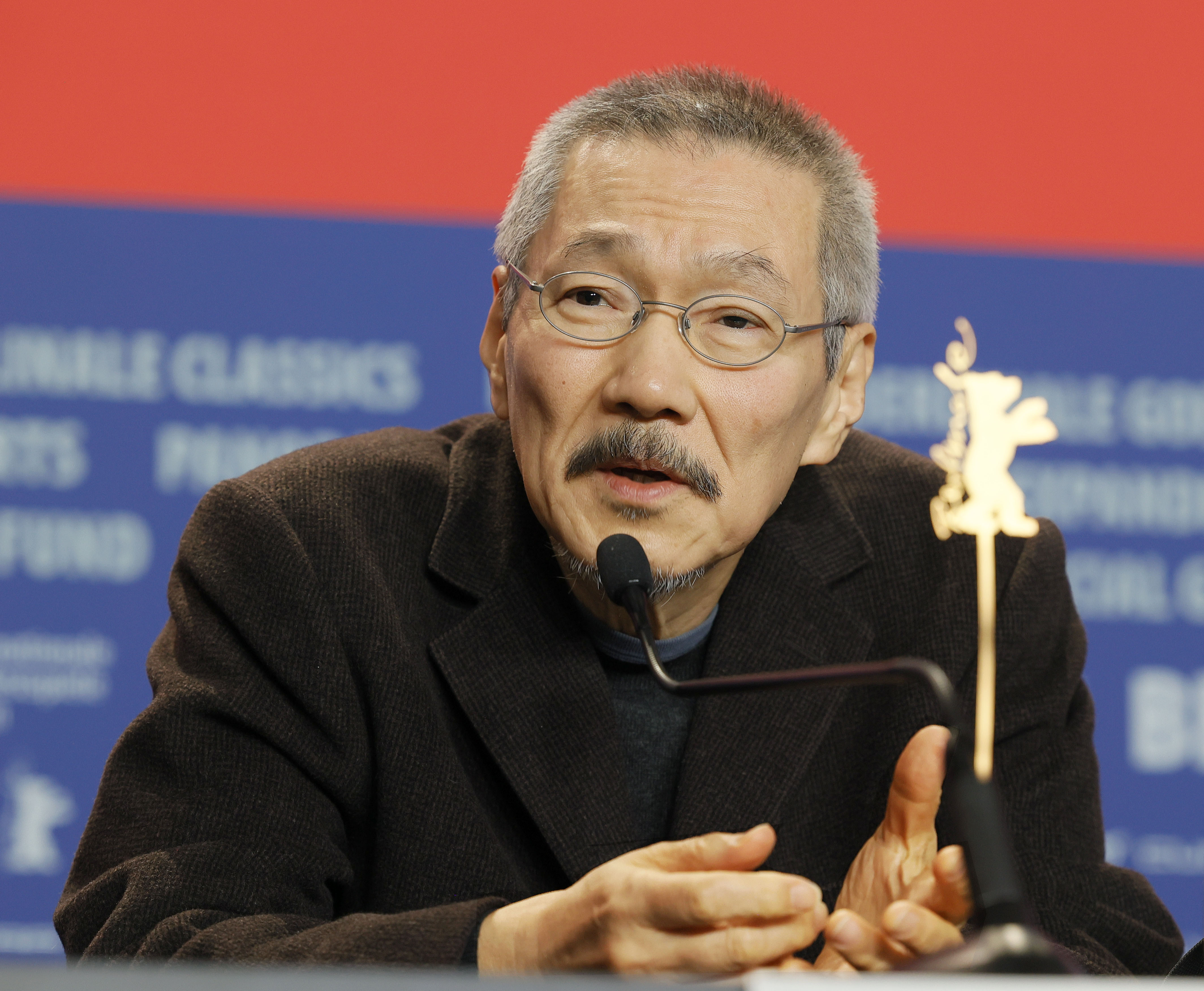
Hong at the Berlinale 2025

In April 2025, Hong was announced as a member of the jury for Main Competition section of the 2025 Cannes Film Festival.

== Filmmaking style ==
Hong's films often treat themes of domestic realism, with many of the scenes set on residential streets, cafes, hotels, schools, and in the stairwells of apartment buildings. Characters in the film are seen walking around the city, drinking soju, and having sex. The main characters are often movie directors or actors, and scenes typically consist of a single shot, often beginning and ending with a camera zoom. The budgets for his movies average about $100,000.

Hong is often spontaneous when shooting, delivering the day's scene on the morning of the shoot and changing the story on set. He rarely prepares scripts in advance. Hong instead begins with a basic guideline and writes his scenes on the morning of the filming day, making changes throughout the day. He starts the filming day at 4 a.m. when he begins to write the dialogue for that day's shoot. Hong also develops close relationships with the actors over alcohol and cigarettes and sometimes shoots scenes while the actors are intoxicated.

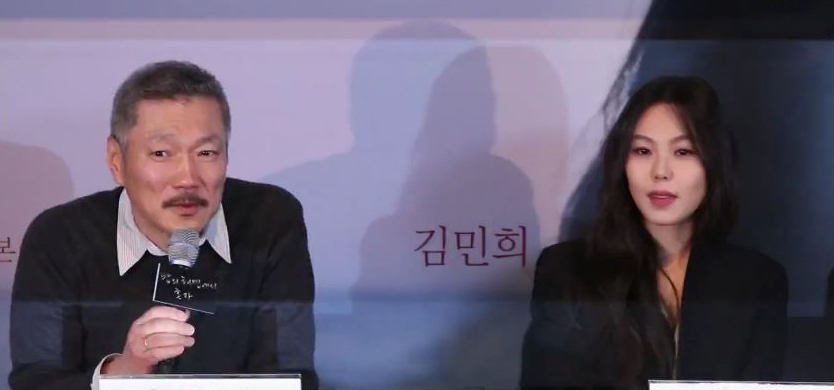
Hong and Kim Min-hee admitted to their affair at a press conference in Seoul in March 2017.

Hong's style has been compared to Eric Rohmer's, with some arguing that some of his films deliberately allude to Rohmer's, as well as Yasujirō Ozu.

== Personal life ==
In 1985, Hong married his wife and they had one daughter together.

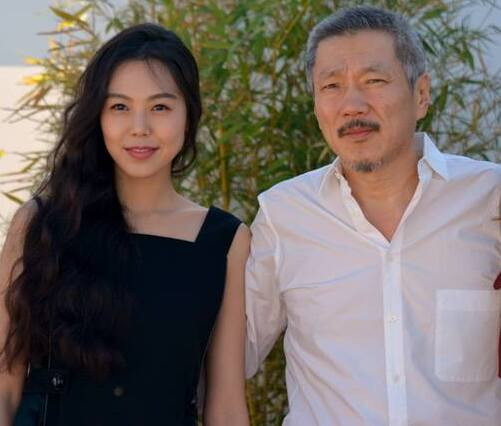
Kim and Hong attending the Cannes Film Festival

In 2016, Hong was reported to be having an extramarital affair with actress Kim Min-hee, who had appeared in his 2015 film Right Now, Wrong Then. Hong admitted to the affair in March 2017, at the Seoul premiere of On the Beach at Night Alone. It was also reported that after he told his wife and daughter about his relationship with Kim, that he left their home in September of that year, although some sources reported that the couple had lived separately for years, prior to the relationship with Kim. He filed for divorce from his wife in December 2016, but the court rejected his request in June 2019, insisting that only the injured party, Hong's wife, could initiate a legal separation.

On January 14, 2025, after Hong was seen accompanying Kim to an obstetrics clinic, it was reported by news outlets that Hong and Kim were expecting their first child. Kim later gave birth to a son on April 8, 2025.

== Filmography ==
=== Feature films ===
Year	English Title	Original Title	Also credited as				Notes
Year	English Title	Original Title	Producer	Composer	Editor	Cinematographer	Notes
1996	The Day a Pig Fell into the Well	돼지가 우물에 빠진 날	No	No	No	No	Premiere at the 1997 Berlin International Film Festival
1998	The Power of Kangwon Province	강원도의 힘	No	No	No	No	International premiere at the 1998 Cannes Film Festival
2000	Virgin Stripped Bare by Her Bachelors	오! 수정	No	No	No	No	International premiere at the 2000 Cannes Film Festival
2002	On the Occasion of Remembering the Turning Gate	생활의 발견	No	No	No	No	International premiere at the 2002 Toronto International Film Festival
2004	Woman Is the Future of Man	여자는 남자의 미래다	No	No	No	No	World premiere at the 2004 Cannes Film Festival
2005	Tale of Cinema	극장전	Yes	No	No	No	World premiere at the 2005 Cannes Film Festival
2006	Woman on the Beach	해변의 여인	No	No	No	No	International premiere at the 2006 Toronto International Film Festival
2008	Night and Day	밤과 낮	No	No	No	No	World premiere at the 2008 Berlin International Film Festival
2009	Like You Know It All	잘 알지도 못하면서	No	No	No	No	International premiere at the 2009 Cannes Film Festival
2010	Hahaha	하하하	No	No	No	No	World premiere at the 2010 Cannes Film Festival
2010	Oki's Movie	옥희의 영화	No	No	No	No	World premiere at the 2010 Venice International Film Festival
2011	The Day He Arrives	북촌 방향	Yes	No	No	No	World premiere at the 2011 Cannes Film Festival
2012	In Another Country	다른 나라에서	Yes	No	No	No	World premiere at the 2012 Cannes Film Festival
2013	Nobody's Daughter Haewon	누구의 딸도 아닌 해원	Yes	No	No	No	World premiere at the 2013 Berlin International Film Festival
2013	Our Sunhi	우리 선희	Yes	No	No	No	World premiere at the 2013 Locarno Film Festival
2014	Hill of Freedom	자유의 언덕	Yes	No	No	No	World premiere at the 2014 Venice International Film Festival
2015	Right Now, Wrong Then	지금은 맞고 그때는 틀리다	No	No	No	No	World premiere at the 2015 Locarno Film Festival
2016	Yourself and Yours	당신자신과 당신의]	Yes	No	No	No	World premiere at the 2016 Toronto International Film Festival
2017	On the Beach at Night Alone	밤의 해변에서 혼자	Yes	No	No	No	World premiere at the 2017 Berlin International Film Festival
2017	Claire's Camera	La caméra de Claire	Yes	No	No	No	World premiere at the 2017 Cannes Film Festival
2017	The Day After	그 후	Yes	Yes	No	No	World premiere at the 2017 Cannes Film Festival
2018	Grass	풀잎들	Yes	No	No	No	World premiere at the 68th Berlin International Film Festival
2018	Hotel by the River	강변 호텔	Yes	No	No	No	World premiere at the 2018 Locarno Film Festival
2020	The Woman Who Ran	도망친 여자	Yes	Yes	Yes	No	World premiere at the 2020 Berlin International Film Festival
2021	Introduction	인트로덕션	Yes	Yes	Yes	Yes	World premiere at the 2021 Berlin International Film Festival
2021	In Front of Your Face	당신 얼굴 앞에서	Yes	Yes	Yes	Yes	World premiere at the 2021 Cannes Film Festival
2022	The Novelist's Film	소설가의 영화	Yes	Yes	Yes	Yes	World premiere at the 2022 Berlin International Film Festival
2022	Walk Up	탑	Yes	Yes	Yes	Yes	World premiere at the 2022 Toronto International Film Festival
2023	In Water	물안에서	Yes	Yes	Yes	Yes	World premiere at the 2023 Berlin International Film Festival
2023	In Our Day	우리의 하루	Yes	Yes	Yes	Yes	World premiere at the 2023 Cannes Film Festival
2024	A Traveler's Needs	여행자의 필요	Yes	Yes	Yes	Yes	World premiere at the 74th Berlin International Film Festival
2024	By the Stream	수유천	Yes	Yes	Yes	Yes	World premiere at the 77th Locarno Film Festival
2025	What Does That Nature Say to You	그 자연이 네게 뭐라고 하니	Yes	Yes	Yes	Yes	World premiere at the 75th Berlin International Film Festival
2026	The Day She Returns	그녀가 돌아온 날	Yes	Yes	Yes	Yes	World premiere at the 76th Berlin International Film Festival
2026	Nowhere to Lay My Eyes	눈둘데가 없네	Yes	Yes	Yes	Yes	World premiere at the 79th Locarno Film Festival

=== Short films ===
Year	English Title	Also credited as		
Year	English Title	Producer	Cinematographer	Editor
2009	Lost in the Mountains (Jeonju Digital Project: Visitors)	No	No	No
2011	List	No	No	No
2013	50:50 (Venice 70: Future Reloaded)	No	No	No
2021	Hong Sangsoo — Winner of the Silver Bear for Best Screenplay	Yes	Yes	Yes
2021	Letter to the New York Film Festival	Yes	Yes	Yes
2022	Small Flower	Yes	Yes	Yes
2023	Another Letter to New York Film Festival	Yes	Yes	Yes

== Accolades ==
=== Korean awards ===
- 1996 - 17th Blue Dragon Film Awards: Best New Director for The Day a Pig Fell into the Well
- 1996 - 16th Korean Association of Film Critics Awards: Best New Director for The Day a Pig Fell into the Well
- 1998 - 19th Blue Dragon Film Awards: Best Director; Best Screenplay for The Power of Kangwon Province
- 2000 - 1st Busan Film Critics Awards: Best Screenplay for Virgin Stripped Bare by Her Bachelors
- 2006 - 9th Director's Cut Awards: Best Director for Woman on the Beach
- 2008 - 28th Korean Association of Film Critics Awards: Best Screenplay for Night and Day
- 2010 - 19th Buil Film Awards: Best Director for Hahaha
- 2013 - 14th Busan Film Critics Awards: Special Jury Prize for Our Sunhi
- 2014 - 23rd Buil Film Awards: Best Director for Our Sunhi
- 2015 - 2nd Wildflower Film Awards: Best Director, Narrative Films for Hill of Freedom
- 2017 - Busan Film Critics Awards: Grand Prize for On the Beach at Night Alone
- 2017 - Busan Film Critics Awards: Grand Prize for The Day After
- 2018 - 5th Wildflower Film Awards: Best Director, Narrative Films for The Day After
- 2022 - Busan Film Critics Awards: Grand Prize for In Front of Your Face
- 2023 - 24th Busan Film Critics Awards: Special Jury Prize for Walk Up

=== International awards ===
- 1996 - 15th Vancouver International Film Festival: Dragons and Tigers Award for The Day a Pig Fell into the Well
- 1997 - 42nd Asia Pacific Film Festival: Best New Director for The Day a Pig Fell into the Well
- 1997 - International Film Festival Rotterdam: Tiger Award for The Day a Pig Fell into the Well
- 1999 - Singapore International Film Festival: NETPAC-FIPRESCI Special Mention for The Power of Kangwon Province
- 1999 - Santa Barbara International Film Festival: Burning Vision Award for The Power of Kangwon Province
- 2000 - 45th Asia Pacific Film Festival: Best Screenplay for Virgin Stripped Bare by Her Bachelors
- 2000 - 13th Tokyo International Film Festival: Special Jury Prize for Virgin Stripped Bare by Her Bachelors
- 2002 - 47th Asia Pacific Film Festival: Best Director for On the Occasion of Remembering the Turning Gate
- 2003 - Seattle International Film Festival: Emerging Masters Showcase Award
- 2007 - 22nd Mar del Plata International Film Festival: Best Director for Woman on the Beach
- 2010 - 63rd Cannes Film Festival: Prix Un Certain Regard for Hahaha
- 2011 - 40th International Film Festival Rotterdam: Return of the Tiger Award for Oki's Movie
- 2013 - 66th Locarno International Film Festival: Best Director for Our Sunhi
- 2015 - 68th Locarno International Film Festival: Golden Leopard for Right Now, Wrong Then
- 2016 - 64th San Sebastián International Film Festival: Best Director for Yourself and Yours
- 2017 - Jerusalem Film Festival: Best International Film for On the Beach at Night Alone
- 2017 - LA Film Festival: World Fiction Award for On the Beach at Night Alone
- 2018 - Gijón International Film Festival: Winner for Hotel by the River
- 2018 - Gijón International Film Festival: Best Screenplay for Hotel by the River
- 2020 - 70th Berlin International Film Festival: Silver Bear for Best Director for The Woman Who Ran
- 2021 - 71st Berlin International Film Festival: Silver Bear for Best Screenplay for Introduction
- 2021 - Gijón International Film Festival: Special Jury Award for In Front of Your Face
- 2022 - 72nd Berlin International Film Festival: Silver Bear Grand Jury Prize for The Novelist's Film
- 2024 - 74th Berlin International Film Festival: Silver Bear Grand Jury Prize for A Traveler's Needs
- 2026 - 79th Locarno Film Festival: Pardo for Best Direction for Nowhere to Lay My Eyes

=== State honors ===
Name of the Country	Year Awarded	Name of the Honor	Ref.
South Korea (Note: Honors are given at the Korean Popular Culture and Arts Awards, arranged by the Korea Creative Content Agency and hosted by the Ministry of Culture, Sports and Tourism. They are awarded to those who have contributed to the arts and South Korea's pop culture.)	2011	Presidential Commendation	

== Frequent collaborators ==
Collaborator	1996	1998	2000	2002	2004	2005	2006	2008	2009	2009	2010	2010	2011	2012	2013	2013	2014	2015	2016	2017	2017	2017	2018	2018	2020	2021	2021	2022	2022	2023	2023	2024	2024	2025	2026	Total
Collaborator	The Day a Pig Fell Into the Well	The Power of Kangwon Province	Virgin Stripped Bare by Her Bachelors	On the Occasion of Remembering the Turning Gate	Woman Is the Future of Man	Tale of Cinema	Woman on the Beach	Night and Day	Like You Know It All	Visitors	Hahaha	Oki's Movie	The Day He Arrives	In Another Country	Nobody's Daughter Haewon	Our Sunhi	Hill of Freedom	Right Now, Wrong Then	Yourself and Yours	Claire's Camera	On the Beach at Night Alone	The Day After	Grass	Hotel by the River	The Woman Who Ran	In Front of Your Face	Introduction	The Novelist's Film	Walk Up	In Our Day	In Water	A Traveler's Needs	By the Stream	What Does That Nature Say to You	The Day She Returns	
Sung-Won Hahm		Yes	Yes	Yes	Yes	Yes	Yes				Yes	Yes	Yes	Yes	Yes	Yes	Yes			Yes	Yes	Yes														16
Yong-jin Jeong					Yes	Yes	Yes		Yes	Yes	Yes	Yes	Yes	Yes	Yes	Yes	Yes	Yes																		13
Kim Min-hee																		Yes		Yes	Yes	Yes	Yes	Yes	Yes		Yes	Yes		Yes	Yes		Yes			12
Kwon Hae-hyo														Yes					Yes		Yes	Yes		Yes	Yes	Yes		Yes	Yes			Yes	Yes	Yes		12
Hong-yeol Park											Yes	Yes		Yes	Yes	Yes	Yes	Yes	Yes		Yes															9
Hyung Koo Kim					Yes	Yes	Yes						Yes		Yes						Yes	Yes	Yes	Yes												9
Cho-hee Kim											Yes	Yes	Yes	Yes	Yes	Yes	Yes	Yes																		8
Gi Ju-bong								Yes			Yes						Yes	Yes						Yes			Yes	Yes		Yes						8
Song Seon-mi							Yes						Yes								Yes			Yes	Yes				Yes	Yes					Yes	8
Yoo Joon-sang									Yes		Yes		Yes	Yes	Yes			Yes	Yes					Yes												8
Ha Seong-guk																									Yes		Yes	Yes		Yes	Yes	Yes		Yes		7
Cho Yun-hee																						Yes				Yes		Yes				Yes		Yes	Yes	6
Moon Sung-keun			Yes				Yes			Yes		Yes		Yes							Yes															6
Park Mi-so																											Yes	Yes	Yes	Yes				Yes	Yes	6
Seo Young-hwa												Yes					Yes	Yes			Yes				Yes		Yes									6
Kim Eui-sung	Yes												Yes		Yes		Yes		Yes																	5
Ye Ji-won				Yes							Yes				Yes	Yes											Yes									5
Ahn Jae-hong													Yes		Yes						Yes		Yes													4
Jung Yu-mi										Yes		Yes		Yes		Yes																				4
Lee Hye-yeong																										Yes		Yes	Yes			Yes				4
Lee Sun-kyun										Yes		Yes			Yes	Yes																				4
Shin Seok-ho																									Yes		Yes		Yes		Yes					4
Youn Yuh-jung											Yes			Yes			Yes	Yes																		4
Go Hyun-jung							Yes		Yes				Yes																							3
Han Jae-yi															Yes	Yes							Yes													3
Isabelle Huppert														Yes						Yes												Yes				3
Jeong Jae-yeong																Yes		Yes			Yes															3
Kim Sae-byeok																						Yes	Yes		Yes											3
Kim Sang-kyung				Yes		Yes					Yes																									3
Kim Seung-yun																														Yes	Yes	Yes				3
Kim Tae-woo					Yes		Yes		Yes																											3
Kim Young-ho								Yes			Yes																Yes									3
Moon So-ri											Yes			Yes			Yes																			3
Yeon-ji Son															Yes								Yes	Yes												3
