= 72nd Berlin International Film Festival =

2022 film festival in Berlin, Germany

- Festival poster
- Opening film: Peter von Kant by François Ozon
- Closing film: Alcarràs by Carla Simón
- Location: Berlin, Germany
- Founded: 1951
- Awards: Golden Bear: Alcarràs by Carla Simón; Honorary Golden Bear: Isabelle Huppert
- Directors: Mariette Rissenbeek
- Artistic director: Carlo Chatrian
- No. of films: 229
- Festival date: Opening: 10 February 2022; Closing: 20 February 2022
- Website: www.berlinale.de

Berlin International Film Festival
- 73rd 71st

The 72nd annual Berlin International Film Festival, usually called the Berlinale (German pronunciation: [bɛʁliˈnaːlə]), took place from 10 to 20 February 2022 in person. On 15 December 2021, the first film of the festival was announced.

The festival opened with François Ozon's drama film Peter von Kant. Isabelle Huppert was awarded Honorary Golden Bear for lifetime achievement on 15 February 2022 at the Berlinale Palast award ceremony. Her new film by Laurent Larivière, About Joan was also screened.

The awards were presented on 16 February 2022 truncating the festival by 4 days. Alcarràs by Carla Simón won the Golden Bear award and The Novelist's Film by Hong Sang-soo won the Silver Bear Grand Jury Prize. The festival formally closed on 20 February 2022.

== Jury ==
=== Main Competition ===
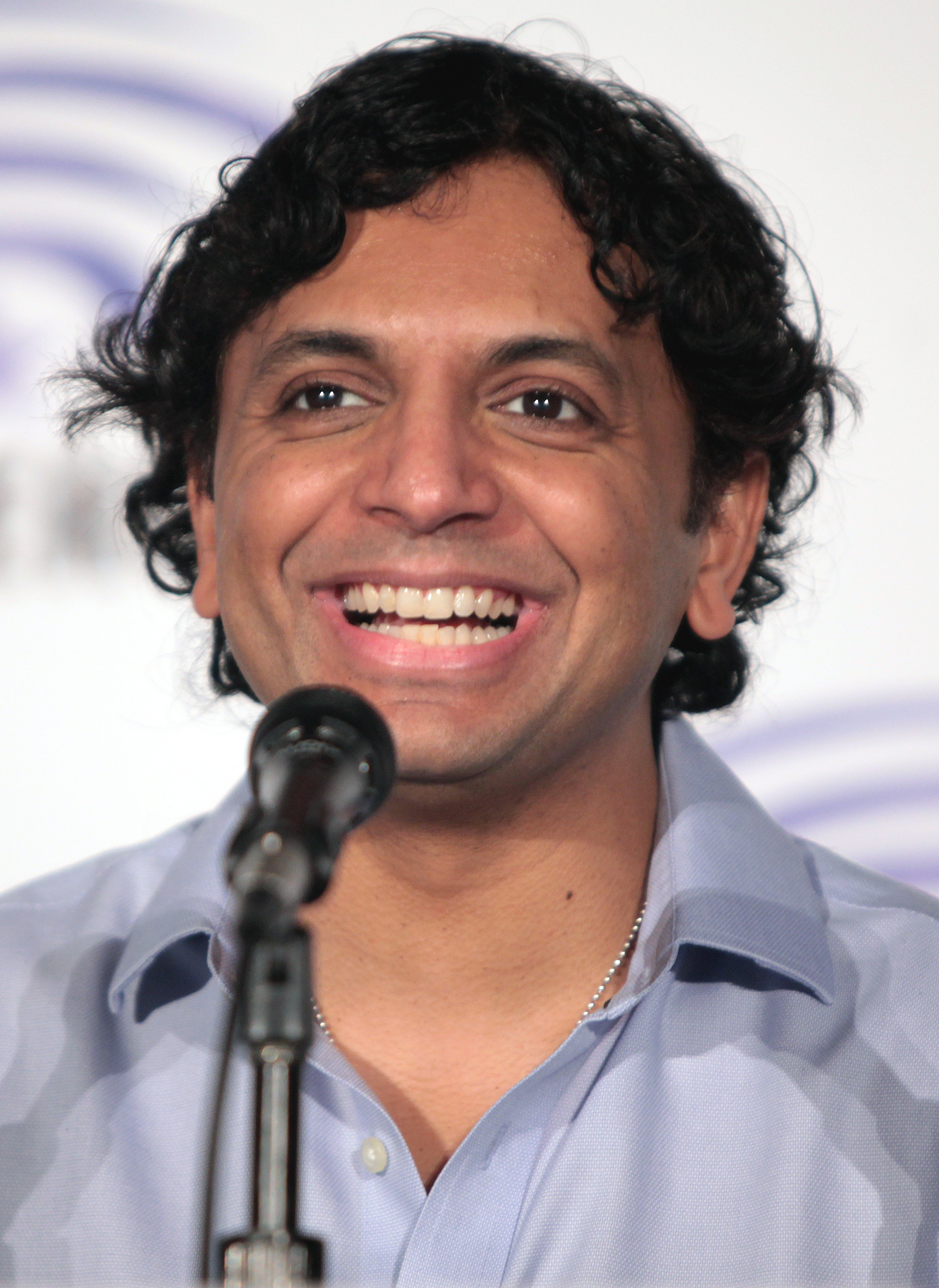
M. Night Shyamalan, Jury President (competition)

The following were on the jury for the Berlinale Competition section:

- M. Night Shyamalan, American filmmaker and producer - Jury President
- Karim Aïnouz, Brazilian filmmaker
- Saïd Ben Saïd, Tunisian producer
- Anne Zohra Berrached, German filmmaker
- Tsitsi Dangarembga, Zimbabwean novelist, playwright and filmmaker
- Ryusuke Hamaguchi, Japanese filmmaker
- Connie Nielsen, Danish actress

=== Encounters ===
The following people were on the jury for the Encounters Awards:

- Chiara Marañón
- Ben Rivers
- Silvan Zürcher

=== FIPRESCI Jury ===
The following people were on the jury for the FIPRESCI Awards:

Main Competition：

- René Marx (as Chair of the Jury)
- Hsin Wang
- Anna Maria Pasetti

Encounters：

- Andrei Vasilenko
- Lamia Fathy
- Anders E. Larsson

Panorama：

- Ron Fogel (absent)
- Berke Göl
- Pamela Jahn

Forum：

- Bettina Hirsch
- Hamed Soleimanzadeh
- Alexander Zwart

== Official sections ==
=== Main Competition ===
The following films are selected for the main competition for the Golden Bear and Silver Bear awards:

English title	Original title	Director(s)	Production country
A E I O U - A Quick Alphabet of Love	A E I O U - Das schnelle Alphabet der Liebe	Nicolette Krebitz	Germany, France
Alcarràs		Carla Simón	Spain, Italy
Before, Now & Then	Nana	Kamila Andini	Indonesia
Both Sides of the Blade	Avec amour et acharnement	Claire Denis	France
Call Jane		Phyllis Nagy	United States
Everything Will Be Ok		Rithy Panh	France, Cambodia
Leonora addio		Paolo Taviani	Italy
The Line	La ligne	Ursula Meier	Switzerland, France, Belgium
The Novelist's Film	소설가의 영화	Hong Sang-soo	South Korea
One Year, One Night	Un año, una noche	Isaki Lacuesta	Spain, France
The Passengers of the Night	Les passagers de la nuit	Mikhaël Hers	France
Peter von Kant		François Ozon	France
A Piece of Sky	Drii Winter	Michael Koch	Switzerland, Germany
Rabiye Kurnaz vs. George W. Bush	Rabiye Kurnaz gegen George W. Bush	Andreas Dresen	Germany, France
Return to Dust	隐入尘烟	Li Ruijun	China
Rimini		Ulrich Seidl	Austria, France, Germany
Robe of Gems	Manto de gemas	Natalia López Gallardo	Mexico, Argentina, United States
That Kind of Summer	Un été comme ça	Denis Côté	Canada

=== Berlinale Special ===
The following films were selected to receive special screenings:

English title	Original title	Director(s)	Production country
Berlinale Special Gala
Against the Ice		Peter Flinth	Iceland, United States, Denmark
About Joan	À propos de Joan	Laurent Larivière	France, Germany, Ireland
Dark Glasses	Occhiali neri	Dario Argento	Italy, France
The Forger	Der Passfälscher	Maggie Peren	Germany, Luxembourg
Gangubai Kathiawadi		Sanjay Leela Bhansali	India
Good Luck to You, Leo Grande		Sophie Hyde	United Kingdom
Incredible but True	Incroyable mais vrai	Quentin Dupieux	France, Belgium
The Outfit		Graham Moore	United States
Berlinale Special
1341 Frames of Love and War	1341 Framim Mehamatzlema Shel Micha Bar-Am	Ran Tal	Israel, United Kingdom, United States
A German Party	Eine deutsche Partei	Simon Brückner	Germany
Heart of Oak	Le chêne	Laurent Charbonnier, Michel Seydoux	France
Nest		Hlynur Pálmason	Denmark, Iceland
Nothing Lasts Forever		Jason Kohn	United States
North Terminal	Terminal norte	Lucrecia Martel	Argentina
This Much I Know to Be True		Andrew Dominik	United Kingdom

=== Short Films Competition ===
English title	Original title	Director(s)	Production country
Agrilogistics		Gerard Ortín Castellví	United Kingdom, Spain
Memories from the Eastern Front	Amintiri de pe Frontul de Est	Radu Jude, Adrian Cioflâncă	Romania
It’s Raining Frogs Outside	Ampangabagat Nin Talakba Ha Likol	Maria Estela Paiso	Philippines
Bird in the Peninsula		Atsushi Wada	France, Japan
By Flávio		Pedro Cabeleira	Portugal / France
Haulout	Выход	Evgenia Arbugaeva, Maxim Arbugaev	United Kingdom, Russian Federation
Sunday Morning	Manhã de Domingo	Bruno Ribeiro	Brazil
The Sower of Stars	El sembrador de estrellas	Lois Patiño	Spain
Trap		Anastasia Veber	Russian Federation, Lithuania
Will My Parents Come to See Me		Mo Harawe	Germany, Austria, Somalia

=== Encounters ===
The following films were selected for the Encounters section:

English title	Original title	Director(s)	Production country
American Journal	Journal d'Amérique	Arnaud des Pallières	France
Axiom		Jöns Jönsson	Germany
Brother in Every Inch	Brat vo vsyom	Alexander Zolotukhin	Russia
The City and the City	I Poli ke i Poli	Christos Passalis, Syllas Tzoumerkas	Greece
Coma		Bertrand Bonello	France
The Death of My Mother	Zum Tod meiner Mutter	Jessica Krummacher	Germany
Father's Day		Kivu Ruhorahoza	Rwanda
Flux Gourmet		Peter Strickland	United Kingdom, United States, Hungary
A Little Love Package		Gastón Solnicki	Austria, Argentina
Mutzenbacher		Ruth Beckermann	Austria
Queens of the Qing Dynasty		Ashley McKenzie	Canada
See You Friday, Robinson	À vendredi, Robinson	Mitra Farahani	France, Switzerland, Iran, Lebanon
Small, Slow But Steady	ケイコ 目を澄ませて	Shô Miyake	Japan
Sonne		Kurdwin Ayub	Austria
Unrest	Unrueh	Cyril Schäublin	Switzerland

=== Panorama ===
The following films were selected for the Panorama section:

English title	Original title	Director(s)	Production country
Love, Deutschmarks and Death	Aşk, Mark ve Ölüm	Cem Kaya	Germany
Talking About the Weather	Alle reden übers Wetter	Annika Pinske	Germany
Bettina		Lutz Pehnert	Germany
The Apartment with Two Women	같은 속옷을 입는 두 여자	Kim Se-in	South Korea
Brainwashed: Sex-Camera-Power		Nina Menkes	United States
Happiness	Baqyt	Askar Uzabayev	Kazakhstan
Beautiful Beings	Berdreymi	Guðmundur Arnar Guðmundsson	Iceland, Denmark, Sweden, Netherlands, Czech Republic
Swing Ride	Calcinculo	Chiara Bellosi	Italy, Switzerland
Dreaming Walls		Amélie van Elmbt, Maya Duverdier	Belgium, France, United States, Netherlands, Sweden
Northern Skies Over Empty Space	El norte sobre el vacío	Alejandra Márquez Abella	Mexico
Klondike		Maryna Er Gorbach	Ukraine, Turkey
A Love Song		Max Walker-Silverman	United States
Somewhere Over the Chemtrails	Kdyby radši hořelo	Adam Koloman Rybanský	Czech Republic
Lullaby	Cinco lobitos	Alauda Ruiz de Azúa	Spain
Myanmar Diaries		The Myanmar Film Collective	Netherlands, Myanmar, Norway
Into My Name	Nel Mio Nome	Nicolò Bassetti	Italy
Nelly & Nadine		Magnus Gertten	Sweden
No U-Turn		Ike Nnaebue	Nigeria, South Africa, France, Germany
Una Femmina: The Code of Silence	Una femmina	Francesco Costabile	Italy
We, Students!	Nous, Étudiants !	Rafiki Fariala	Central African Republic, France, Democratic Republic of the Congo, Saudi Arabia
Working Class Heroes	Heroji radničke klase	Miloš Pušić	Serbia
Until Tomorrow	Ta Farda	Ali Asgari	Iran, France, Qatar
Taurus		Tim Sutton	United States
Nobody's Hero	Viens je t'emmène	Alain Guiraudie	France

=== Perspektive Deutsches Kino ===
The following films were selected for the Perspektive Deutsches Kino section:

English title	Original title	Director(s)	Production country
Echo		Mareike Wegener	Germany
Forces	Gewalten	Constantin Hatz	Germany
Ladies Only		Rebana Liz John	Germany, India

=== Forum ===
The following films were selected for the Forum section:

English title	Original title	Director(s)	Production country
Afterwater		Dane Komljen	Germany, Spain, South Korea, Serbia
Beirut the Encounter	Beirut al lika	Borhane Alaouié	Lebanon, Tunisia, Belgium
Camouflage	Camuflaje	Jonathan Perel	Argentina
Come With Me to the Cinema – The Gregors	Komm mit mir in das Cinema – Die Gregors	Alice Agneskirchner	Germany
Dry Ground Burning	Mato seco em chamas	Adirley Queirós, Joana Pimenta	Brazil, Portugal
Europe	Place de l'Europe	Philip Scheffner	Germany, France
A Fine Day	Der schöne Tag	Thomas Arslan	Germany
For the Many: The Vienna Chamber of Labour	Für die Vielen – Die Arbeiterkammer Wien	Constantin Wulff	Austria
A Flower in the Mouth	Une Fleur à la bouche	Éric Baudelaire	France, Germany, South Korea
Geographies of Solitude		Jacquelyn Mills	Canada
Happer's Comet		Tyler Taormina	United States
Hot in Day, Cold at Night	Najeneun deopgo bameneun chupgo	Park Song-yeol	South Korea
Jet Lag		Zheng Lu Xinyuan	Switzerland, Austria
The Kegelstatt Trio	O trio em mi bemol	Rita Azevedo Gomes	Portugal, Spain
Memoryland	Miền ký ức	Kim Quy Bui	Vietnam, Germany
The Middle Ages	La edad media	Alejo Moguillansky, Luciana Acuña	Argentina
My Tongue Does Not Turn	Dilim dönmüyor (Meine Zunge dreht sich nicht)	Serpil Turhan	Germany
My Two Voices	Mis dos voces	Lina Rodriguez	Canada
Nuclear Family		Erin Wilkerson, Travis Wilkerson	United States, Singapore
Rewind & Play		Alain Gomis	France, Germany
Poet	Akyn	Darezhan Omirbaev	Kazakhstan
Scala		Ananta Thitanat	Thailand
Shall I Compare You to a Summer's Day?	Bashtaalak sa'at	Mohammad Shawky Hassan	Egypt, Lebanon, Germany
The State and Me	L'État et moi	Max Linz	Germany
Striking Land	Terra que marca	Raul Domingues	Portugal
Super Natural		Jorge Jácome	Portugal
This House	Cette maison	Miryam Charles	Canada
Three Tidy Tigers Tied a Tie Tighter	Três Tigres Tristes	Gustavo Vinagre	Brazil
The United States of America		James Benning	United States
The Veteran	El veterano	Jerónimo Rodríguez	Chile
We Haven't Lost Our Way	Nie zgubiliśmy drogi	Anka Sasnal, Wilhelm Sasnal	Poland
West Indies	West Indies ou les nègres marrons de la Liberté	Med Hondo	France, Algeria, Mauritania

=== Generation ===
The following films were chosen for the Generation section:

English title	Original title	Director(s)	Production country
Feature films
Rookies	Allons Enfants	Thierry Demaizière and Alban Teurlai	France
Beba		Rebeca Huntt	United States, Mexico
The Quiet Girl	An Cailín Ciúin	Colm Bairéad	Ireland
Comedy Queen		Sanna Lenken	Sweden
Kind Hearts		Olivia Rochette, Gerard-Jan Claes	Belgium
Knor	Oink	Mascha Halberstad	Netherlands
Millie Lies Low		Michelle Savill	New Zealand
My Father’s Truck		Mascha Mauricio Osaki	Vietnam, United States
Sublime		Mariano Biasin	Argentina
Girl Picture	Tytöt tytöt tytöt	Alli Haapasalo	Finland
Short films
An Invisible Apprentice	Una Aprendiz Invisible	Emilia Herbst	Argentina
Goodbye Jerome!	Au revoir Jérôme	Adam Sillard, Gabrielle Selnet, Chloé Farr	France
Blue Noise	Blaues Rauschen	Simon Maria Kubiena	Germany, Austria
Deer	Gavazn	Hadi Babaeifar	Iran
I’m Not Afraid!	Ich habe keine Angst!	Marita Mayer	Germany, Norway
Nothing to See Here	Nada para ver aqui	Nicolas Bouchez	Portugal, Belgium, Hungary
Spotless	Vlekkeloos	Emma Branderhorst	Netherlands

=== Generation Kplus ===
English title	Original title	Director(s)	Production country
Feature Films
The Hill of Secrets	Bimileui eondeok	Lee Ji-eun	South Korea
Waters of Pastaza	Juunt Pastaza entsari	Inês T. Alves	Portugal
Moja Vesna		Sara Kern	Slovenia, Australia
My Small Land		Emma Kawawada	Japan
Shabu		Shamira Raphaëla	Netherlands
The Realm of God	El reino de dios	Claudia Sainte-Luce	Mexico
The Apple Day	Rooz-e sib	Mahmoud Ghaffari	Iran
Short Films
Alma and Paz	Alma y Paz	Cris Gris	Mexico, United States
Luce and the Rock	Luce und der Felsen	Britt Raes	Belgium, France, Netherlands
To Vancouver	Vancouver	Artemis Anastasiadou	Greece

=== Generation 14plus ===
English title	Original title	Director(s)	Production country
Feature Films
Alis		Clare Weiskopf, Nicolas van Hemelryck	Colombia, Chile, Romania
Bubble	Baburu	Tetsurō Araki	Japan
The Land of Sasha	Strana Sasha	Yulia Trofimova	Russia
Kind Hearts		Olivia Rochette, Gerard-Jan Claes	Belgium
Kalle Kosmonaut		Günther Kurth, Tine Kugler	Germany
Scheme	Skhema	Farkhat Sharipov	Kazakhstan
Stay Awake		Jamie Sisley	United States
Short Films
At Sixteen	Aos dezasseis	Carlos Lobo	Portugal
Born in Damascus		Laura Wadha	United Kingdom
Fever	La fièvre	Matias Carlier	Switzerland
Funkele		Nicole Jachmann	Netherlands
Lay Me by the Shore		David Findlay	Canada
Memoir of a Veering Storm		Sofia Georgovassili	Greece
Meneath: The Hidden Island of Ethics		Terril Calder	Canada
Nothing to See Here	Nada para ver aqui	Nicolas Bouchez	Portugal, Belgium
Tinashé		Tig Terera	Australia
West by God		Scott Lazer	United States

=== The Homage films ===
This section in 72nd edition is dedicated to French film and stage actor Isabelle Huppert, who will also be awarded an Honorary Golden Bear for lifetime achievement.

Year	English title	Original title	Director(s)	Production country
1977	The Lacemaker	La Dentellière	Claude Goretta	France, FRG, Switzerland
1980	Every Man for Himself	Sauve qui peut (la vie)	Jean-Luc Godard	France, FRG, Switzerland, Austria
1995	La Cérémonie		Claude Chabrol	France, Germany
2001	The Piano Teacher	La Pianiste	Michael Haneke	France, Germany, Austria
2002	8 Women	8 Femmes	François Ozon	France, Italy
2016	Things to Come	L’Avenir	Mia Hansen-Løve	France, Italy
2016	Elle		Paul Verhoeven	France, Germany, Belgium

=== The Retrospective ===
This section opened on 11 February 2022, with screening in 4K of the 1936 film My Man Godfrey by Gregory La Cava.

Year	English title	Original title	Director(s)	Production country
1934	Belle of the Nineties		Leo McCarey	United States
1941	Design for Scandal		Norman Taurog	United States
1938	Every Day’s a Holiday		A. Edward Sutherland	United States
1938	Four's a Crowd		Michael Curtiz	United States
1935	Goin' to Town		Alexander Hall	United States
1936	Go West, Young Man		Henry Hathaway	United States
1935	Hands Across the Table		Mitchell Leisen	United States
1940	Hired Wife		William A. Seiter	United States
1940	His Girl Friday		Howard Hawks	United States
1933	I'm No Angel		Wesley Ruggles	United States
1936	Klondike Annie		Raoul Walsh	United States
1934	Lady by Choice		David Burton	United States
1941	Mr. & Mrs. Smith		Alfred Hitchcock	United States
1940	My Little Chickadee		Edward F. Cline	United States
1936	My Man Godfrey		Gregory La Cava	United States
1942	My Sister Eileen		Alexander Hall	United States
1932	Night After Night		Archie Mayo	United States
1932	No Man of Her Own		Wesley Ruggles	United States
1937	Nothing Sacred		William A. Wellman	United States
1933	She Done Him Wrong		Lowell Sherman	United States
1942	Take a Letter, Darling		Mitchell Leisen	United States
1941	This Thing Called Love		Alexander Hall	United States
1942	To Be or Not to Be		Ernst Lubitsch	United States
1937	True Confession		Wesley Ruggles	United States
1934	Twentieth Century		Howard Hawks	United States
1943	What a Woman!		Irving Cummings	United States
1939	The Women		George Cukor	United States

=== The Classics ===
The restored silent 1929 classic film Brüder (Brothers) by Werner Hochbaum, screened on 13 February 2022.

Year	English title	Original title	Director(s)	Production country
1929	Brothers	Brüder	Werner Hochbaum	Germany
1962	Mamma Roma		Pier Paolo Pasolini	Italy
1964	Pale Flower	乾いた花	Masahiro Shinoda	Japan
1969/1990	Larks on a String	Skřivánci na niti	Jiří Menzel	Czechoslovakia
1975	Tommy		Ken Russell	United Kingdom
2000	Suzhou River	苏州河	Lou Ye	China, Germany
2004	Our Music	Notre musique	Jean-Luc Godard	Switzerland, France

== Official Awards ==
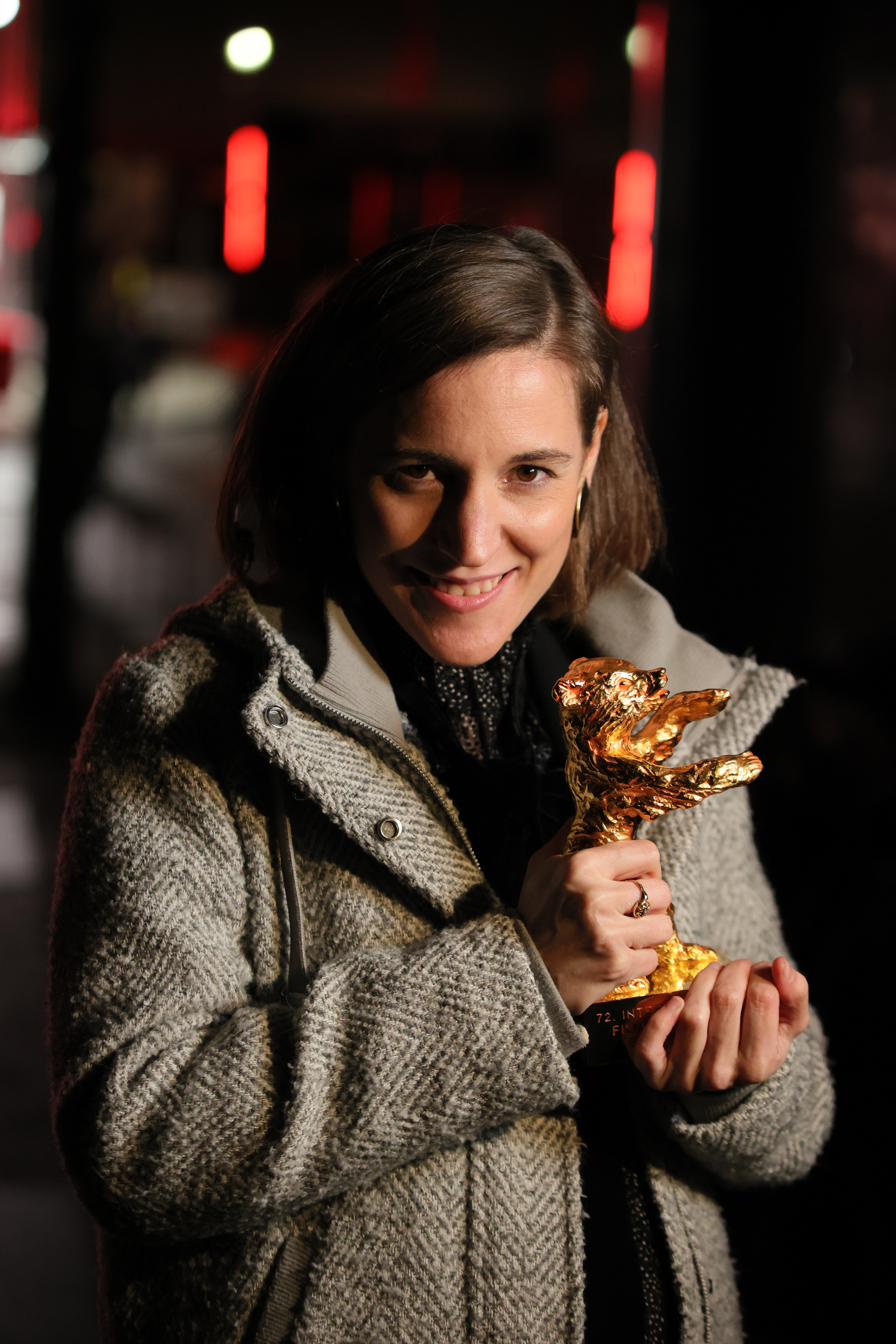
Carla Simón, winner of the Golden Bear for Best Film at the Berlinale 2022

=== Main Competition ===
- Golden Bear: Alcarràs by Carla Simón
- Silver Bear Grand Jury Prize: The Novelist's Film by Hong Sang-soo
- Silver Bear Jury Prize: Robe of Gems by Natalia López
- Silver Bear for Best Director: Claire Denis for Both Sides of the Blade
- Silver Bear for Best Leading Performance: Meltem Kaptan for Rabiye Kurnaz vs. George W. Bush
- Silver Bear for Best Supporting Performance: Laura Basuki for Before, Now & Then
- Silver Bear for Best Screenplay: Laila Stieler for Rabiye Kurnaz vs. George W. Bush
- Silver Bear for Outstanding Artistic Contribution: Rithy Panh and Sarit Mang for Everything Will Be Ok
- Special Mention: A Piece of Sky by Michael Koch

=== Honorary Golden Bear ===
- Isabelle Huppert

=== Encounters ===
- Best Film: Mutzenbacher by Ruth Beckermann
- Best Director: Cyril Schäublin for Unrest
- Special Jury Award: See You Friday, Robinson by Mitra Farahani

=== Short Films Competition ===
- Golden Bear for Best Short Film: Trap by Anastasia Veber
- Silver Bear Jury Prize: Sunday Morning by Bruno Ribiero
- Berlin Short Film Candidate for the European Film Awards: The Sower of Stars by Lois Patiño
  - Special Mention: Bird in the Peninsula by Atsushi Wada

=== Generation ===
==== Youth Jury Awards ====
- Crystal Bear for the Best Film: Alis by Clare Weiskopf
  - Special Mention: Stay Awake by Jamie Sisley
- Crystal Bear for the Best Short Film: Born in Damascus by Laura Wadha
  - Special Mention: Nothing to See Here by Nicolas Bouchez

==== Generation 14plus ====
- Grand Prix:
  - Kind Hearts by Olivia Rochette
  - Scheme by Farkhat Sharipov
- Special Prize for the Best Short Film: Goodbye Jérôme! by Adam Sillard, Gabrielle Selnet, Chloé Farr
  - Special Mention: Blue Noise by Simon Maria Kubiena and Tinashé by Tig Terera

==== Generation Kplus ====
===== Children’s Jury awards =====
- Crystal Bear for the Best Film: Comedy Queen by Sanna Lenken
  - Special Mention: The Quiet Girl by Colm Bairéad
- Crystal Bear for the Best Short Film:
  - Spotless by Emma Branderhorst
  - Luce and the Rock by Britt Raes

===== International Jury =====
- Grand Prix for the Best Film: The Quiet Girl by Colm Bairéad
  - Special Mention: Shabu by Shamira Raphaëla
- Special Prize for the Best Short Film: Gavazn by Hadi Babaeifar
  - Special Mention: To Vancouver by Artemis Anastasiadou

=== GWFF Best First Feature Award ===
- Sonne by Kurdwin Ayub

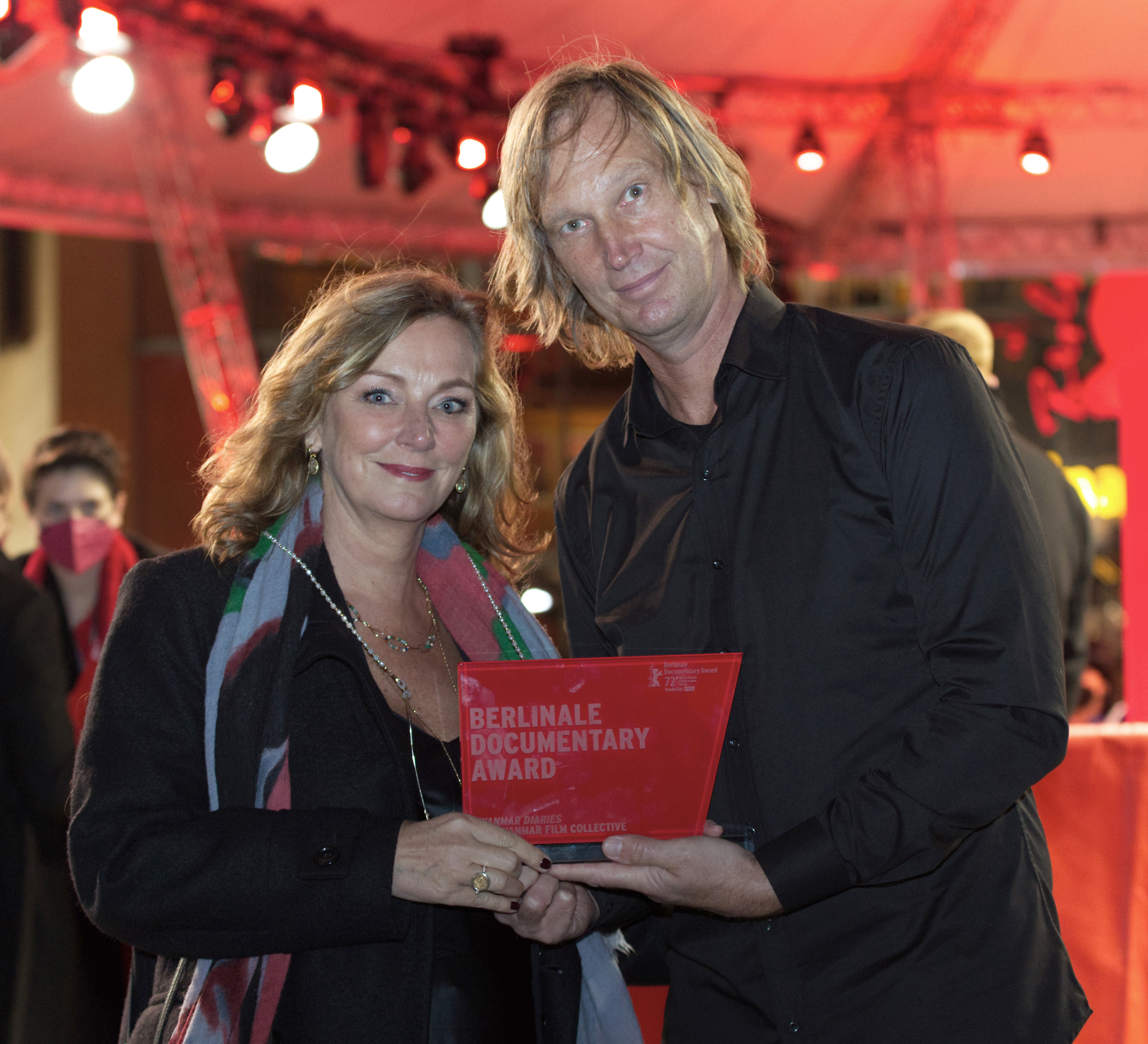
Corinne van Egeraat and Petr Lom winner of Berlinale Documentary Award for Myanmar Diaries

=== Berlinale Documentary Award ===
- Myanmar Diaries by The Myanmar Film Collective
  - Special Mention: No U-Turn by Ike Nnaebue

=== Panorama Audience Award Winner ===
- 1st Place: Baqyt (Happiness) by Askar Uzabayev
- 2nd Place: Klondike by Maryna Er Gorbach
- 3rd Place: Fogaréu by Flávia Neves

=== Panorama Documentary Audience Award Winner ===
- 1st Place: Aşk, Mark ve Ölüm (Love, Deutschmarks and Death) by Cem Kaya
- 2nd Place: Nel mio nome (Into My Name) by Nicolò Bassetti
- 3rd Place: Myanmar Diaries by The Myanmar Film Collective

=== Teddy Award ===
- Best Feature Film: Three Tidy Tigers Tied a Tie Tighter by Gustavo Vinagre
- Best Documentary Film: Alis by Clare Weiskopf and Nicolás van Hemelryck
- Jury Award: Nelly & Nadine by Magnus Gertten
- Best Short Film: Exalted Mars by Jean-Sébastien Chauvin

== Independent Awards ==
=== FIPRESCI Critics Award ===
- Leonora addio by Paolo Taviani
