= The Masked Singer (German TV series) season 12 =

The Masked Singer
- Season 12
- Starring: Verona Pooth; Chris Tall; Various guests
- Hosted by: Matthias Opdenhövel
- No. of contestants: 9
- Winner: Meltem Kaptan as "Muuhnika"
- Runner-up: Pietro Lombardi as "Rave-ioli"
- No. of episodes: 6

Release
- Original network: ProSieben
- Original release: 8 November – 13 December 2025

Season chronology
- ← Previous; Season 11 Next → Season 13

The twelfth season of the German singing competition The Masked Singer premiered on 8 November 2025 on ProSieben.

== Panelists and host ==
Season 12 main panelists and host

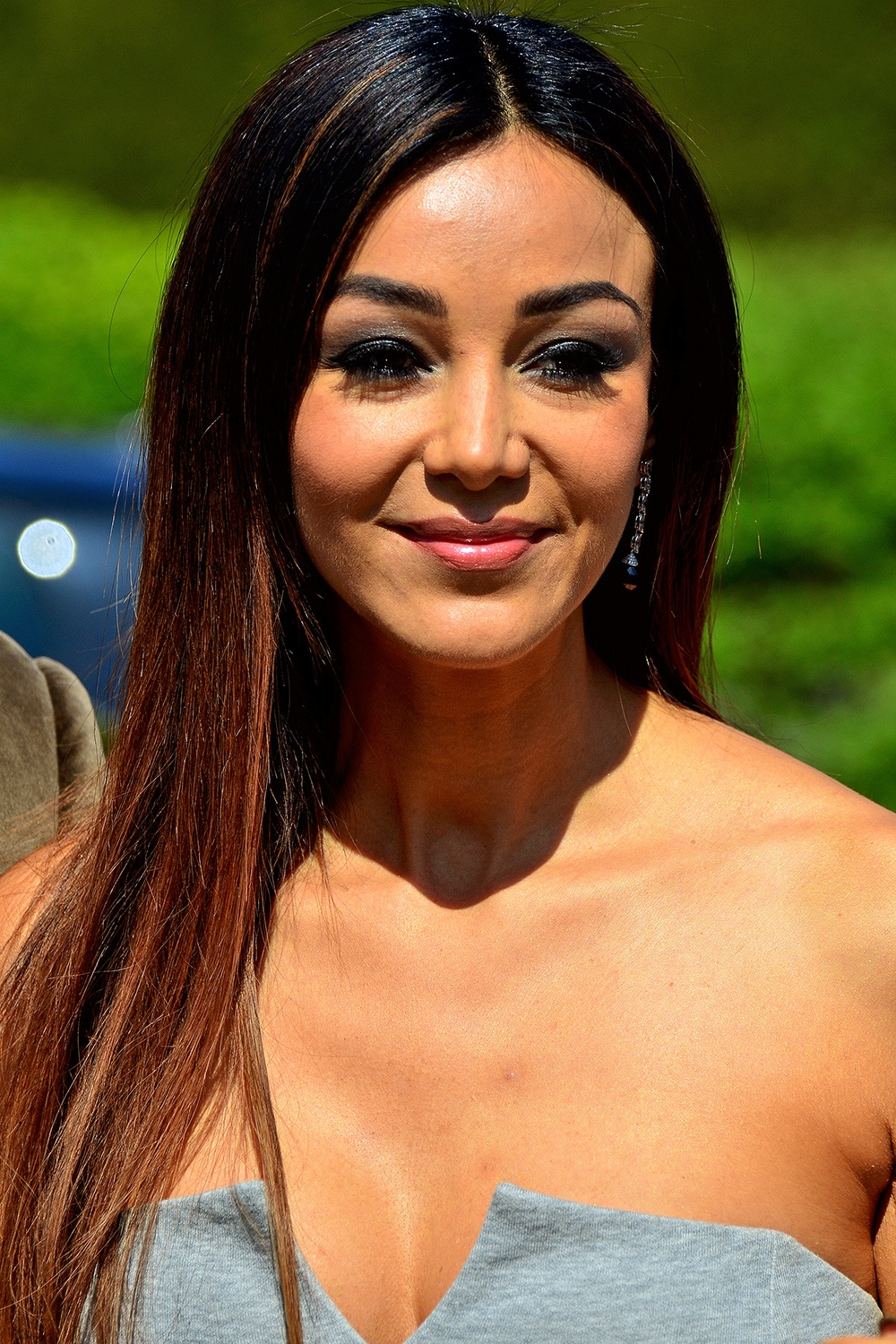
Verona Pooth

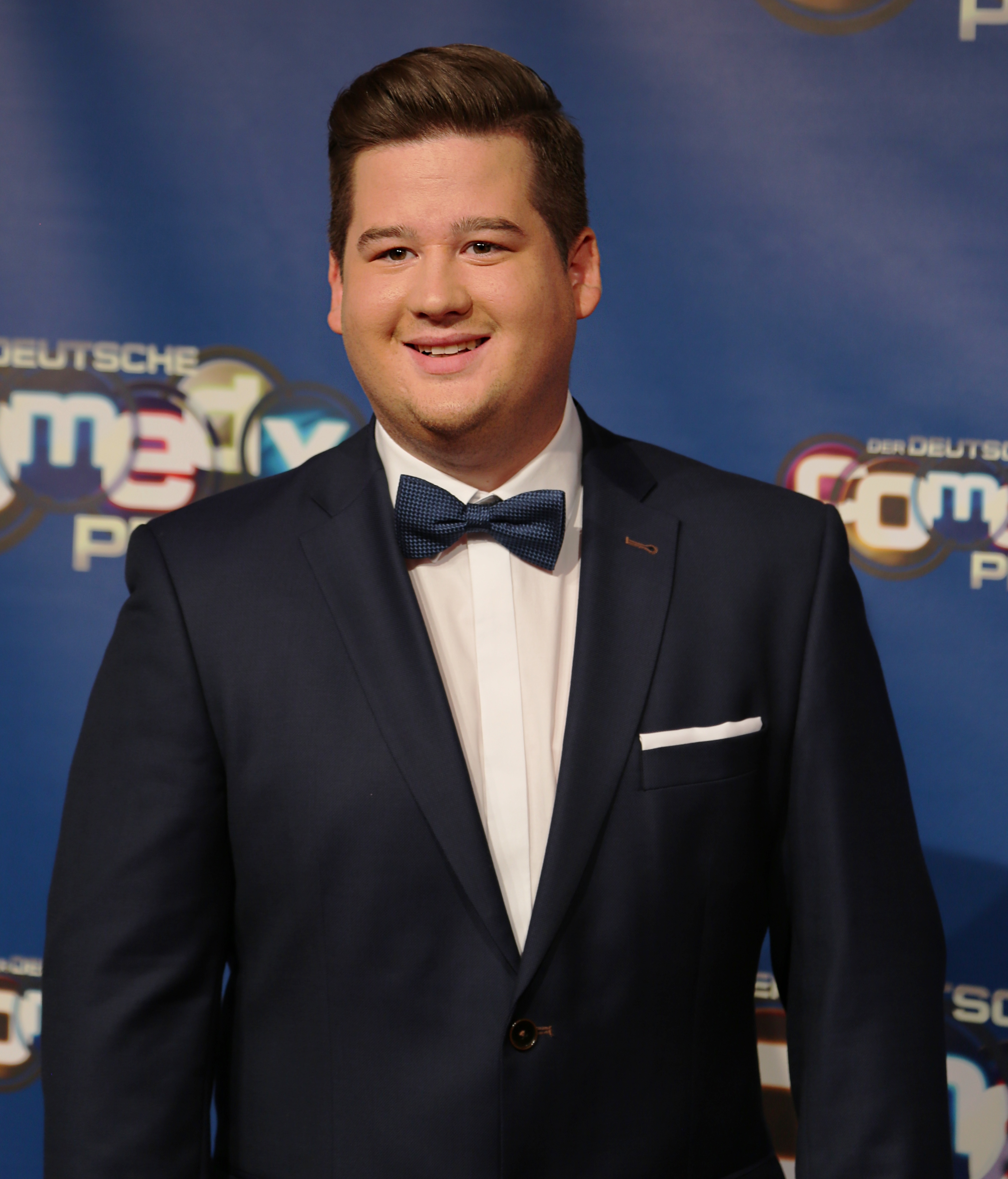
Chris Tall

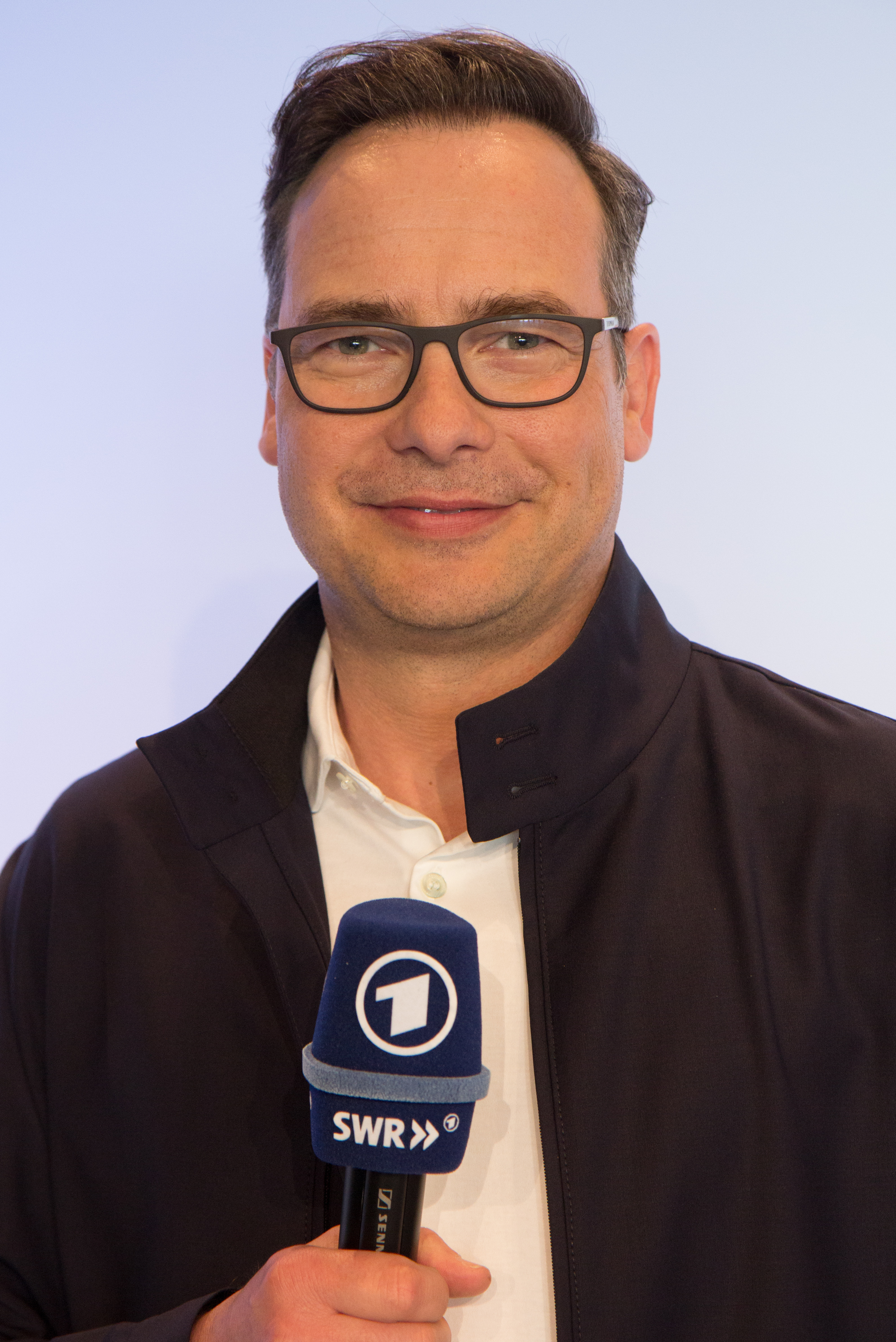
Matthias Opdenhövel

In this season, there are two new members on the guessing panel, actress and TV host Verona Pooth, and comedian Chris Tall. Matthias Opdenhövel returned for his twelfth season as host.

=== Guest panelists ===
Various guest panelists appeared as the third and fourth judge in the judging panel for one episode. These guest panelists included:

Episode	Panelist		Guest Panelist(s)	
1	Verona Pooth	Chris Tall	Edin Hasanović	
2	Verona Pooth	Chris Tall	Alec Völkel	Sascha Vollmar
3	Verona Pooth	Chris Tall	Sasha	
4	Verona Pooth	Chris Tall	Conchita Wurst	
5	Verona Pooth	Chris Tall	Álvaro Soler	
6	Verona Pooth	Chris Tall	Beatrice Egli	

Season 12 guest panelists

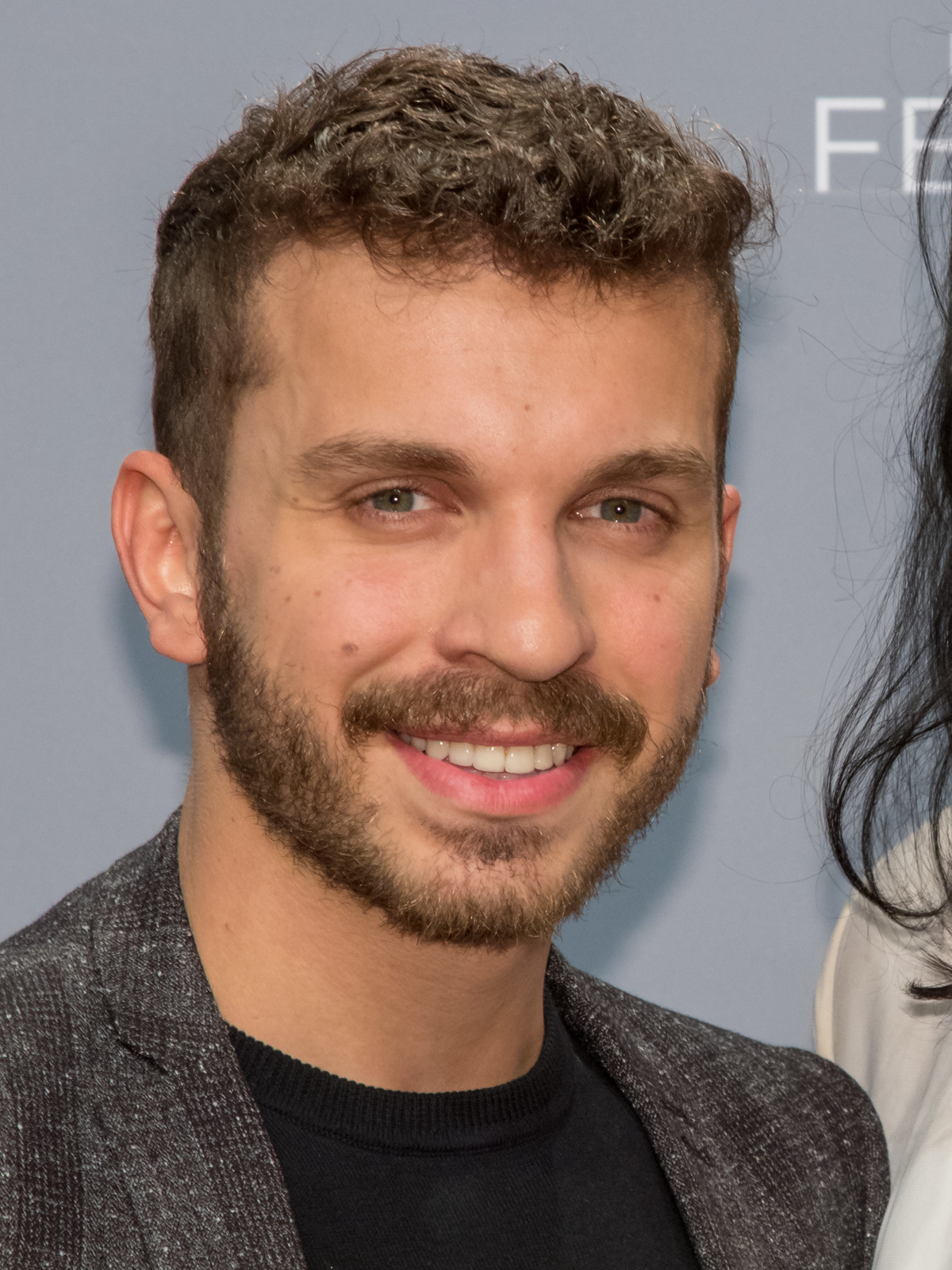
Edin Hasanović (episode 1)

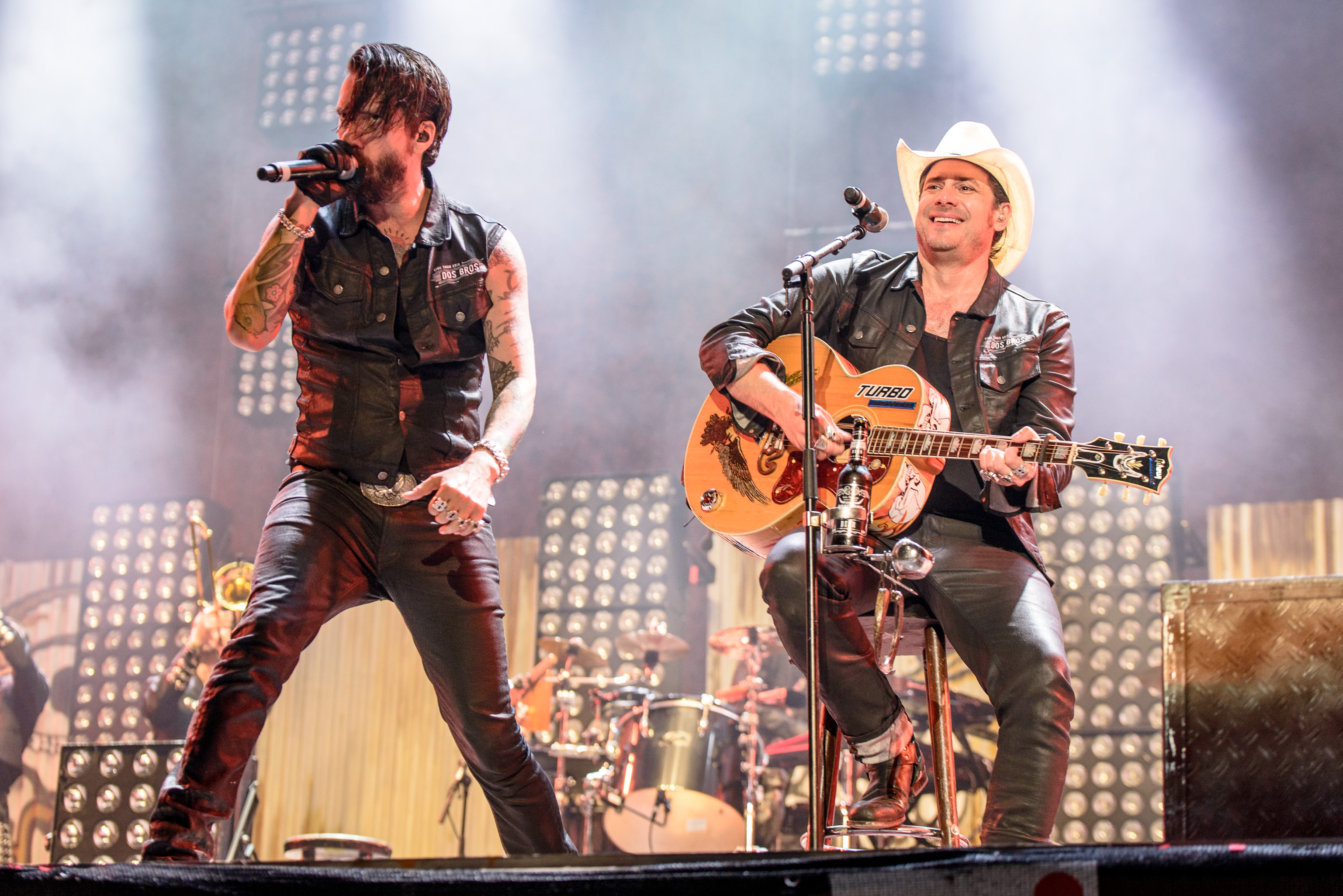
Alec Völkel and Sascha Vollmar (episode 2)

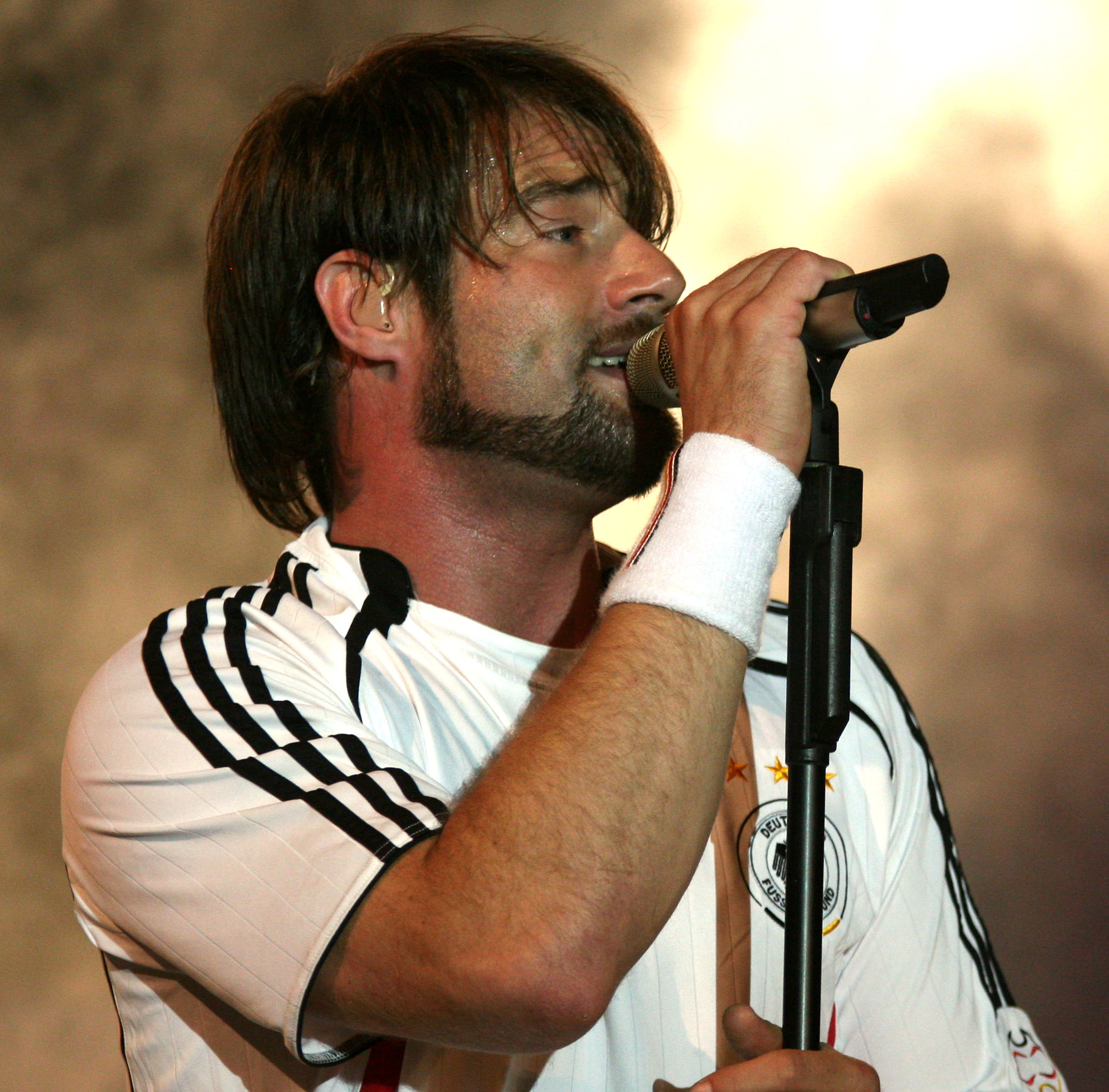
Sasha (episode 3)

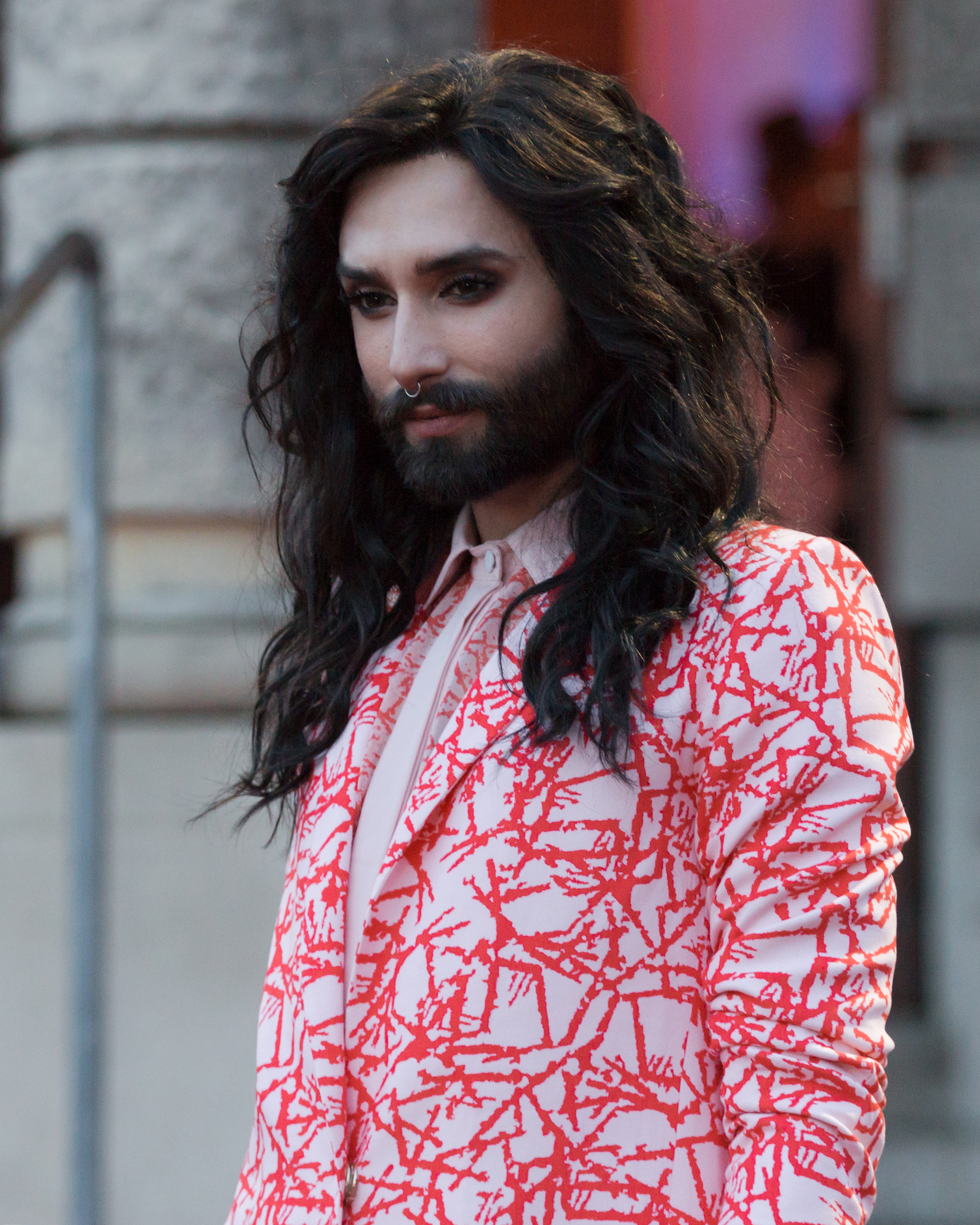
Conchita Wurst (episode 4)

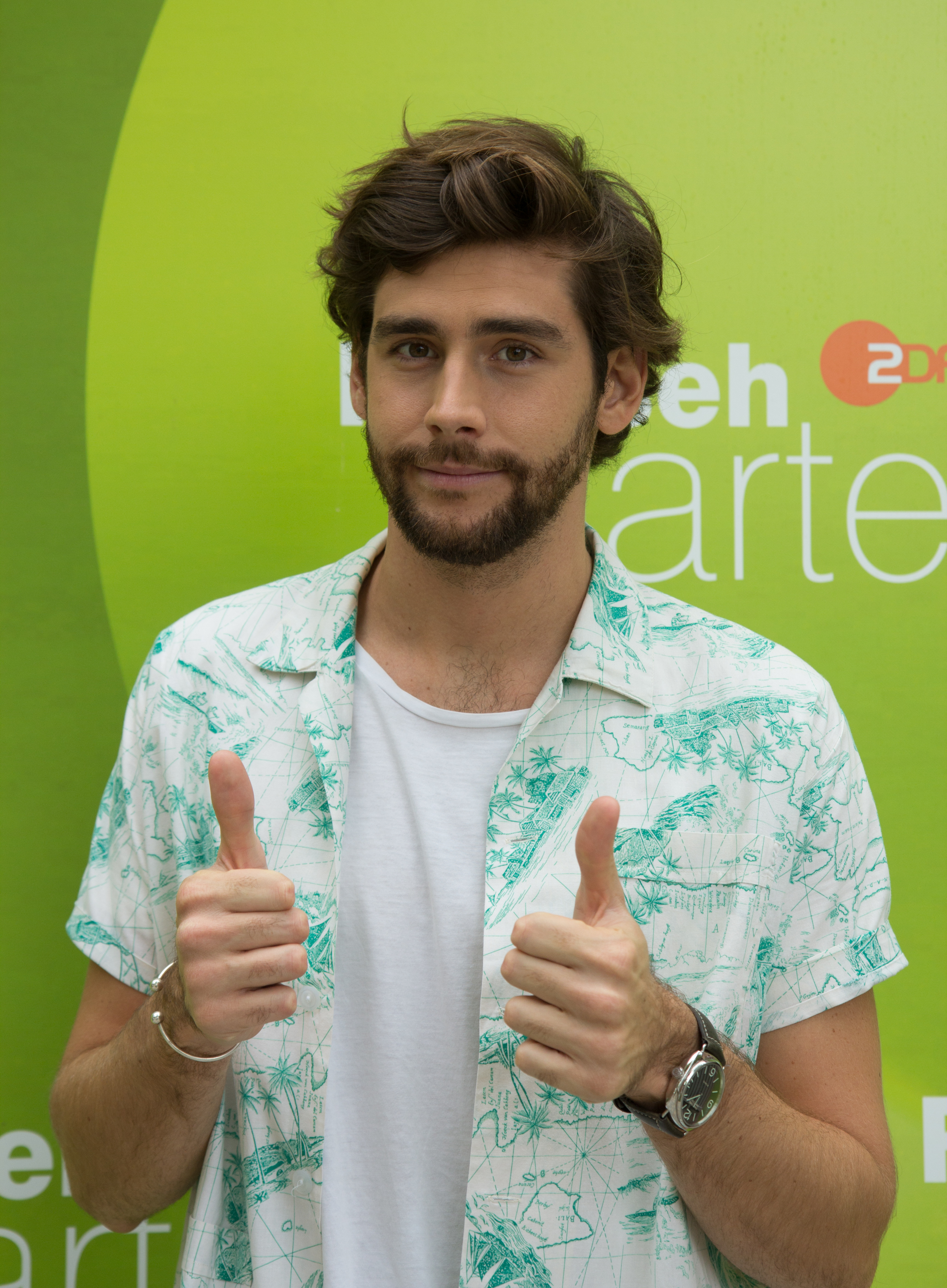
Álvaro Soler (episode 5)

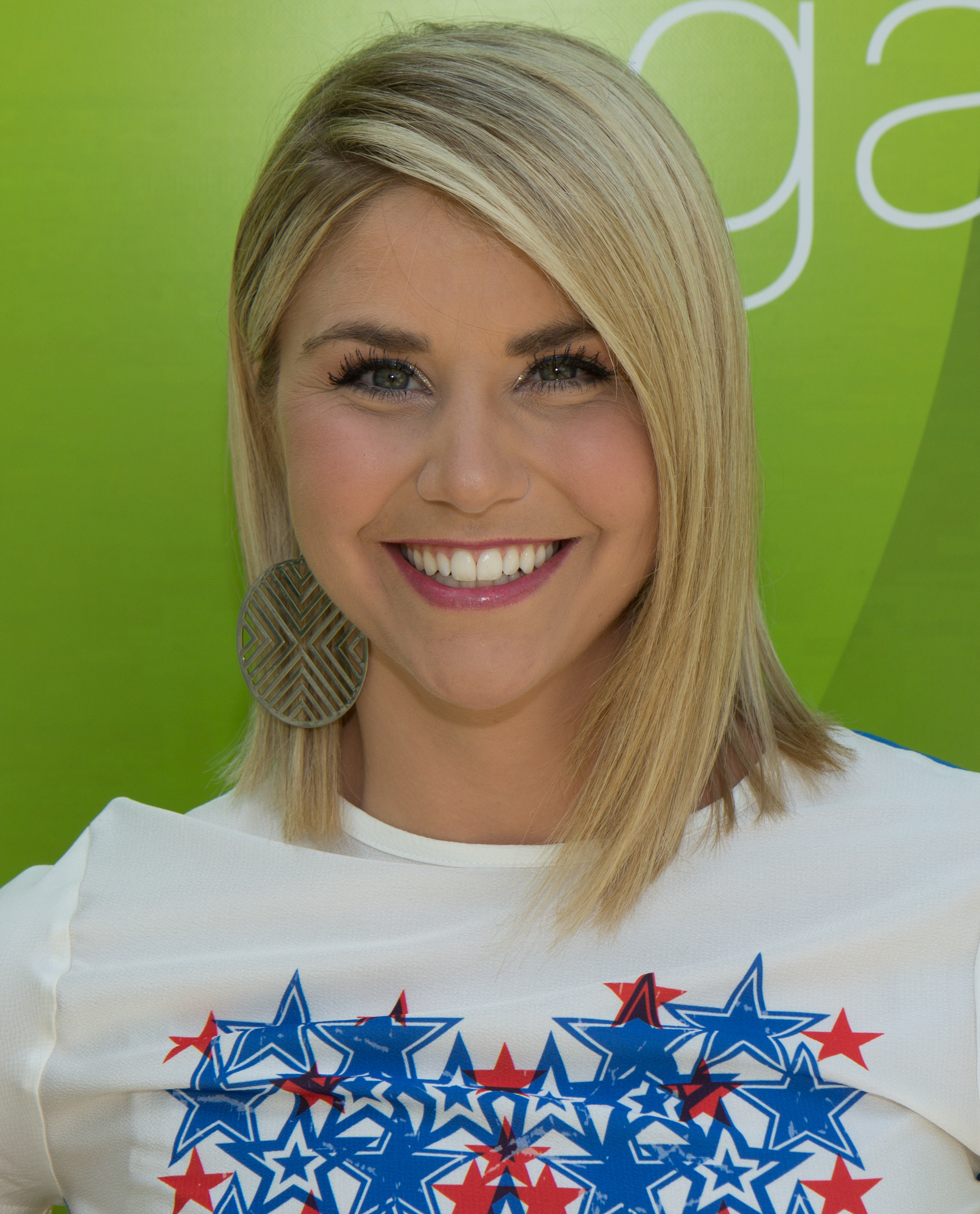
Beatrice Egli (episode 6)

== Contestants ==
The season features 9 contestants, which is less than the number of contestants in the previous season, as it featured 10 contestants.

Results
Stage name	Celebrity	Notability	Live Episodes							
Stage name	Celebrity	Notability	1	2	3	4	5	6		
Stage name	Celebrity	Notability	1	2	3	4	5	A	B	C
Muuhnika "Moonika"	Meltem Kaptan	Actress	SAFE	SAFE	SAFE	SAFE	SAFE	SAFE	SAFE	WINNER
Rave-ioli	Pietro Lombardi	Singer	SAFE	SAFE	SAFE	SAFE	SAFE	SAFE	SAFE	RUNNER-UP
King	Wayne Carpendale	Actor	SAFE	RISK	RISK	RISK	RISK	SAFE	THIRD	
Eggi	Amira Aly	Presenter	SAFE	SAFE	RISK	SAFE	RISK	OUT		
Harry Otter	Clemens Schick	Actor	RISK	SAFE	SAFE	SAFE	OUT			
Dude	Jared Hasselhoff	Musician	SAFE	RISK	SAFE	OUT				
Quietsch "Squeak"	Natalia Wörner	Actress/Writer	SAFE	SAFE	OUT					
Kiss	Brigitte Nielsen	Actress/Model	SAFE	OUT						
Smiley	Barbara Becker	Actress	OUT							

The masked singer lost their face-off and was in the bottom three/two, but was not eliminated.
The masked singer was safe from elimination.
The masked singer was eliminated from the competition and unmasked upon their elimination.
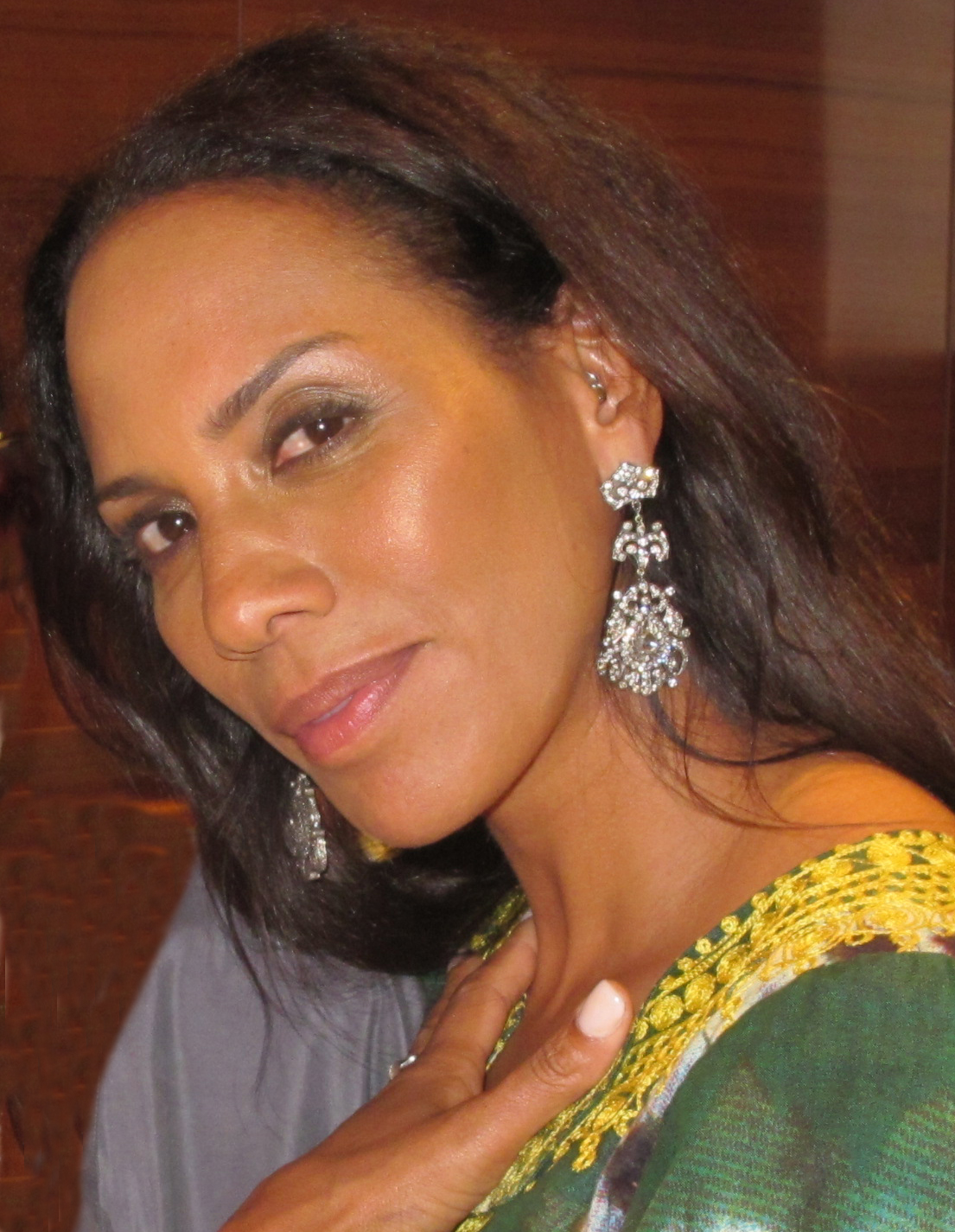
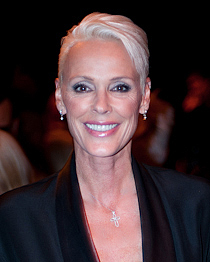
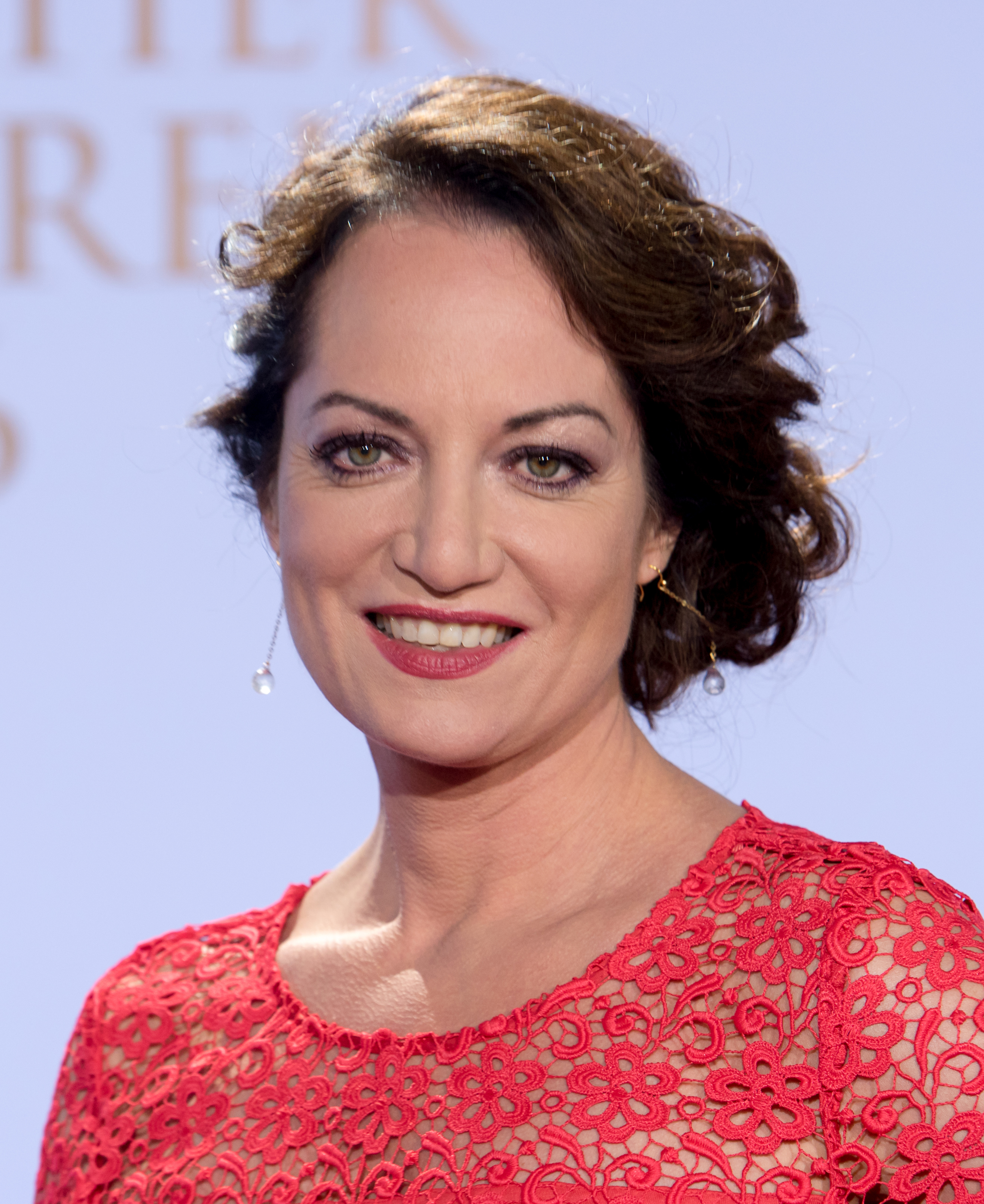
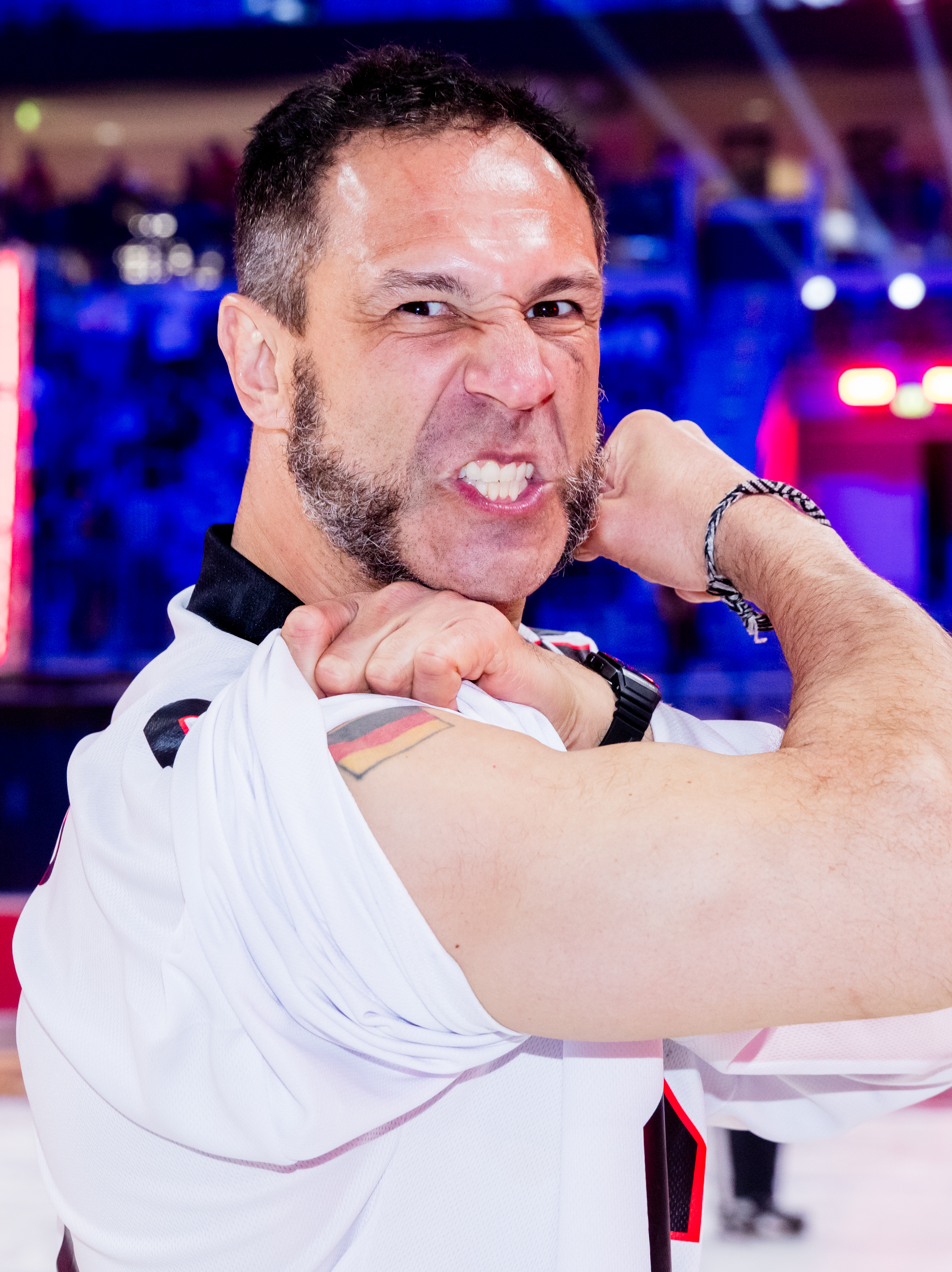
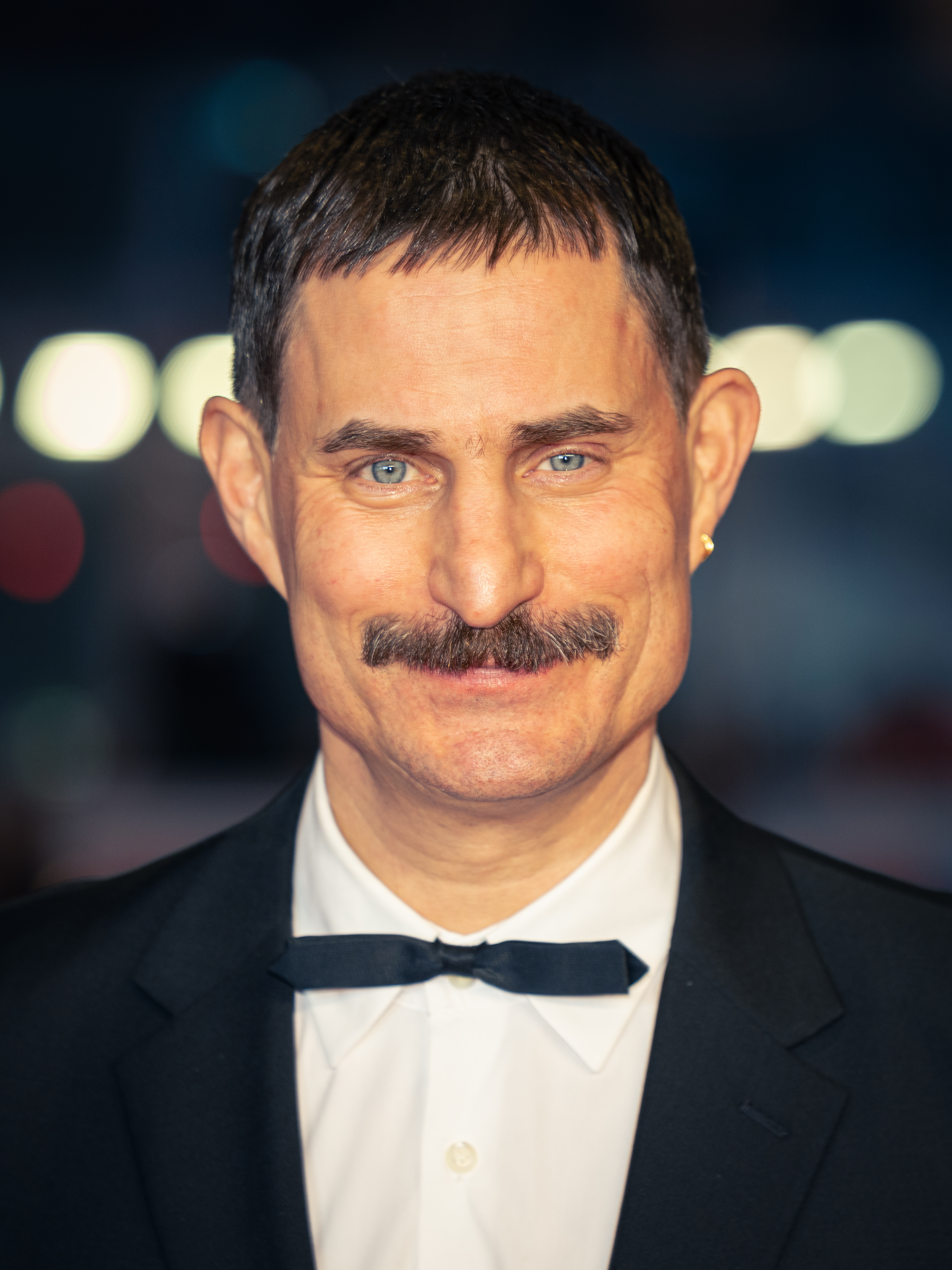
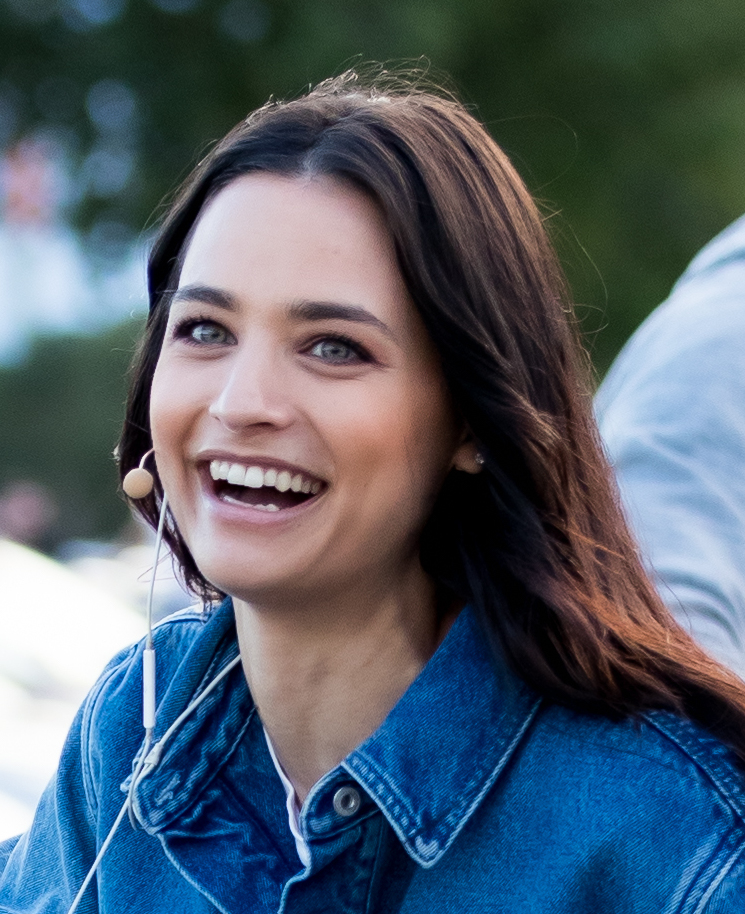
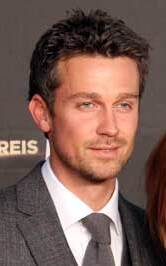
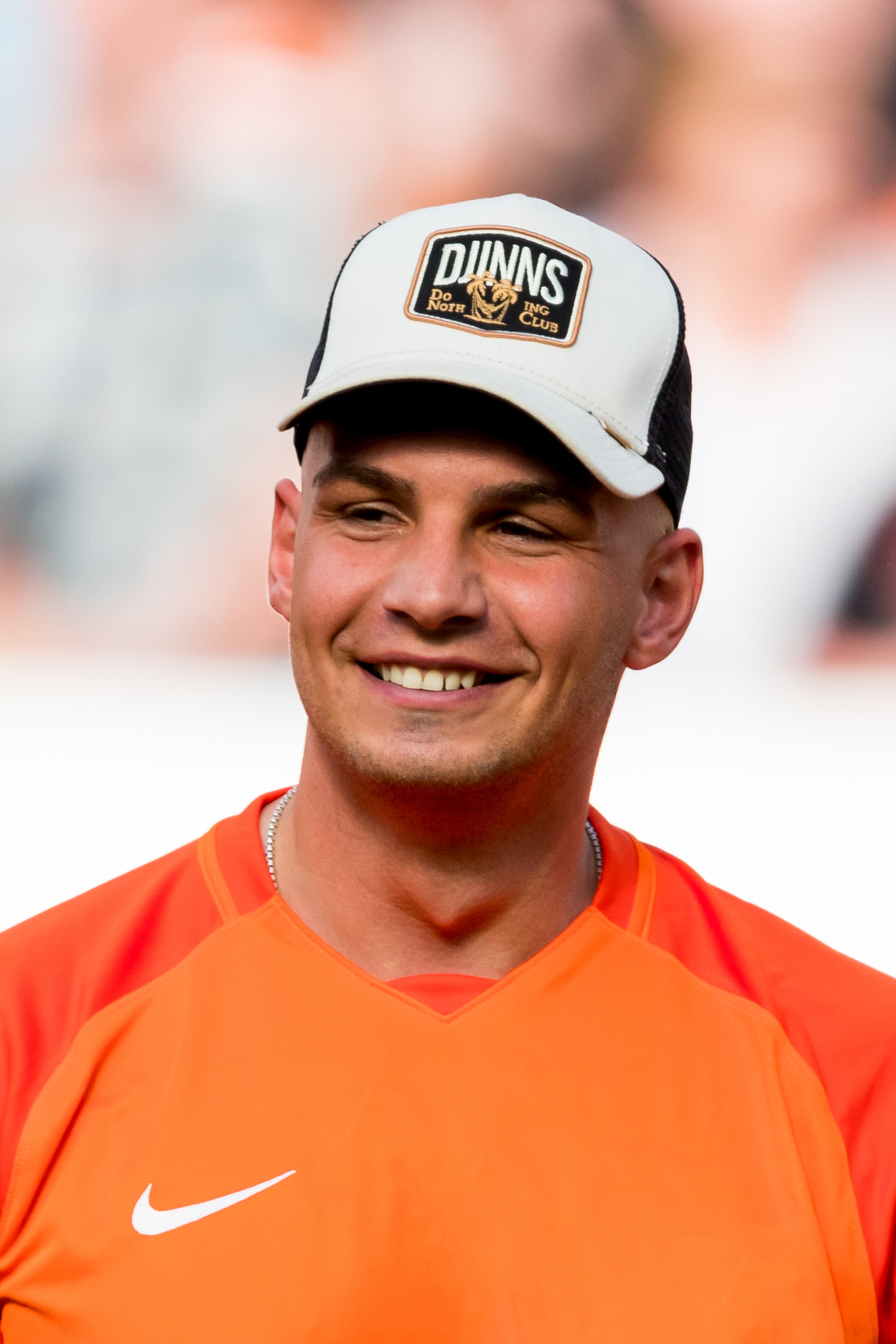
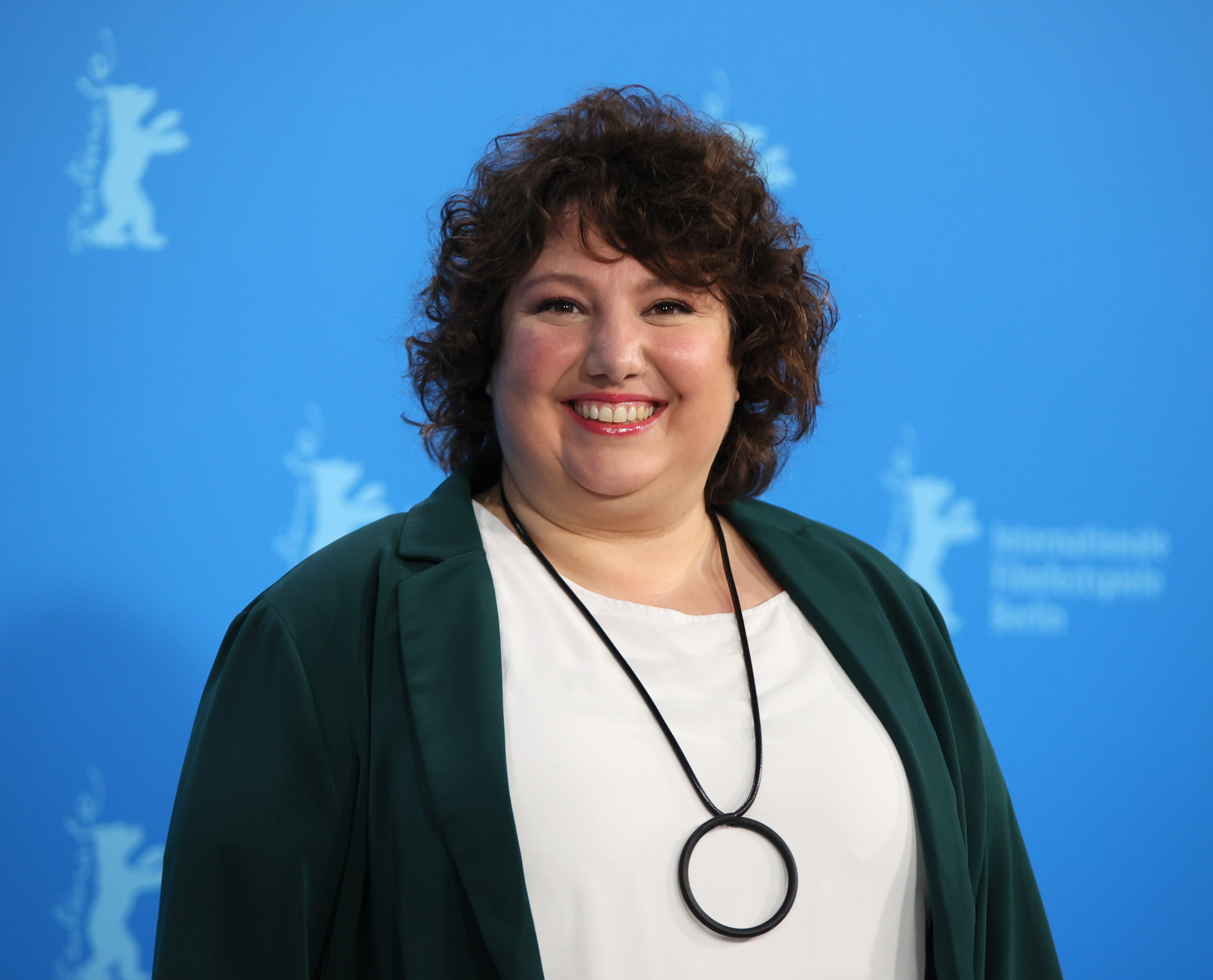
The celebrities who have competed in thetwelfth season of The Masked Singer, pictured in order of elimination (l-r):
Barbara Becker ("Smiley"), Brigitte Nielsen ("Kiss"), Natalia Wörner ("Quietsch"), Jared Hasselhoff ("Dude"), Clemens Schick ("Harry Otter"), Amira Aly ("Eggi"), Wayne Carpendale ("King"), Pietro Lombardi ("Rave-ioli"), Meltem Kaptan ("Muuhnika")

== Episodes ==
=== Week 1 (8 November) ===
Performances on the first live episode
#	Stage name	Song	Identity	Result
1	Kiss	"Lovefool" by The Cardigans	undisclosed	SAFE
2	Muuhnika	"9 to 5" by Dolly Parton/"Milkshake" by Kelis	undisclosed	SAFE
3	Dude	"Hot in Herre" by Nelly	undisclosed	SAFE
4	Quietsch	"You've Got a Friend in Me" by Randy Newman	undisclosed	SAFE
5	Harry Otter	"A Kind of Magic" by Queen	undisclosed	RISK
6	Rave-ioli	"In My Head" by Jason Derulo	undisclosed	SAFE
7	Eggi	"Hollaback Girl" by Gwen Stefani	undisclosed	SAFE
8	Smiley	"On Top of the World" by Imagine Dragons	Barbara Becker	OUT
9	King	"Rock DJ" by Robbie Williams	undisclosed	SAFE

=== Week 2 (15 November) ===
Performances on the second live episode
#	Stage name	Song	Identity	Result
1	Eggi	"Saturday Night" by Whigfield	undisclosed	SAFE
2	Dude	"All The Small Things" by Blink-182	undisclosed	RISK
3	Rave-ioli	"Sweat" by Inner Circle	undisclosed	SAFE
4	Harry Otter	"Poker Face" by Lady Gaga	undisclosed	SAFE
5	King	"A Little Less Conversation" by Elvis Presley	undisclosed	RISK
6	Quietsch	"Ella, elle l'a" by France Gall	undisclosed	SAFE
7	Kiss	"Espresso" by Sabrina Carpenter	Brigitte Nielsen	OUT
8	Muuhnika	"Still Loving You" by Scorpions	undisclosed	SAFE

- Before the Voting is official, The BossHoss sings: "I'll Be Back" by The BossHoss

=== Week 3 (22 November) ===
Performances on the third live episode
#	Stage name	Song	Identity	Result
1	King	"I See Fire" by Ed Sheeran	undisclosed	RISK
2	Eggi	"La Isla Bonita" by Madonna	undisclosed	RISK
3	Harry Otter	"Wake Me Up When September Ends" by Green Day	undisclosed	SAFE
4	Dude	"Time After Time" by Cyndi Lauper	undisclosed	SAFE
5	Muuhnika	"Abracadabra" by Lady Gaga	undisclosed	SAFE
6	Quietsch	"Le Freak" by Chic	Natalia Wörner	OUT
7	Rave-ioli	"A Whole New World" from Aladdin	undisclosed	SAFE

- Before the Voting is official, Sasha sings: "Beautiful Things" by Benson Boone

=== Week 4 (29 November) ===
Performances on the fourth live episode
#	Stage name	Song	Identity	Result
1	Eggi	"99 Luftballon" by Nena	undisclosed	SAFE
1	Eggi	"Uptown Girl" by Billy Joel	undisclosed	SAFE
2	Muuhnika	"Vogue" by Madonna	undisclosed	SAFE
2	Muuhnika	"Fame" by Irene Cara	undisclosed	SAFE
3	Dude	"Unbelievable" by EMF	Jared Hasselhoff	OUT
3	Dude	"Here I Go Again" by Whitesnake	Jared Hasselhoff	OUT
4	Harry Otter	"Blue Monday" by New Order	undisclosed	SAFE
4	Harry Otter	"Quit Playing Games" by The Backstreet Boys	undisclosed	SAFE
5	Rave-ioli	"You Are Not Alone" by Michael Jackson	undisclosed	SAFE
5	Rave-ioli	"Karma Chameleon" by Culture Club	undisclosed	SAFE
6	King	"Freedom! '90" by George Michael	undisclosed	RISK
6	King	"Summer of '69" by Bryan Adams	undisclosed	RISK

=== Week 5 (6 December) ===
Performances on the fifth live episode
#	Stage name	Song	Identity	Result
1	King	"The Cup of Life" by Ricky Martin	undisclosed	RISK
1	King	"Auf uns" by Andreas Bourani	undisclosed	RISK
2	Rave-ioli	"Titanium" by David Guetta & Sia	undisclosed	SAFE
2	Rave-ioli	"We Are the Champions" by Queen	undisclosed	SAFE
3	Eggi	"Gimme! Gimme! Gimme!" by ABBA	undisclosed	RISK
3	Eggi	"Too Lost in You" by Sugababes	undisclosed	RISK
4	Muuhnika	"One Moment in Time" by Whitney Houston	undisclosed	SAFE
4	Muuhnika	"Let's Get Loud" by Jennifer Lopez	undisclosed	SAFE
5	Harry Otter	"Sweet Caroline" by Neil Diamond	Clemens Schick	OUT
5	Harry Otter	"Major Tom (Völlig losgelöst)" by Peter Schilling	Clemens Schick	OUT

- Before the Voting is official, Álvaro Soler sings: "Jardín de los Recuerdos" by Álvaro Soler and Jared Hasselhoff sings: "Seven Nation Army" by The White Stripes

=== Week 6 (13 December) - Final ===
- Group number: "Forever Young" by David Guetta, Alphaville and Ava Max

==== Round One ====
Performances on the final live episode – Round one
#	Stage name	Song	Identity	Result
1	Rave-ioli	"Fresh" by Kool & the Gang	undisclosed	SAFE
2	Eggi	"Ex's & Oh's" by Elle King	Amira Aly	OUT
3	King	"Stand by Me" by Ben E. King	undisclosed	SAFE
4	Muuhnika	"I Was Made For Lovin' You" by Yungblud	undisclosed	SAFE

==== Round Two ====
Performances on the final live episode – round two
#	Stage name	Song	Identity	Result
1	King	"Fly Me to the Moon" by Frank Sinatra	Wayne Carpendale	THIRD
2	Rave-ioli	"We Are The World" by USA for Africa	undisclosed	SAFE
3	Muuhnika	"Lovely" by Billie Eilish & Khalid	undisclosed	SAFE

==== Round Three ====
Performances on the final live episode – round three
#	Stage name	Song	Identity	Result
1	Rave-ioli	"You Are Not Alone" by Michael Jackson	Pietro Lombardi	RUNNER-UP
2	Muuhnika	"Abracadabra" by Lady Gaga	Meltem Kaptan	WINNER

- Before the final round, Beatrice Egli sings: "Hör nie auf damit" by Beatrice Egli and Loi sings: "Hurt" by Christina Aguilera

== Reception ==
=== Ratings ===
Episode	Original airdate	Timeslot	Viewers (in millions)		Share (in %)		Source
Episode	Original airdate	Timeslot	Household	Adults 14–49	Household	Adults 14–49	Source
1	8 November 2025	Saturday 8:15 pm	1.29	0.43	6.6	12.6	
2	15 November 2025	Saturday 8:15 pm	1.26	0.39	6.4	10.8	
3	22 November 2025	Saturday 8:15 pm	1.05	0.27	5.5	7.5	
4	29 November 2025	Saturday 8:15 pm	1.01	0.35	5.1	10.1	
5	6 December 2025	Saturday 8:15 pm	0.87	0.28	4.5	7.9	
6	13 December 2025	Saturday 8:15 pm	1.17	0.33	6.2	9.9	
Average			1.11	0.34	5.7	9.8	
