= Silver Bear for Best Leading Performance =

Award presented annually by the Berlin International Film Festival

- Silberner Bär/Bester Schauspielerische Leistung in einer Hauptrolle (German)
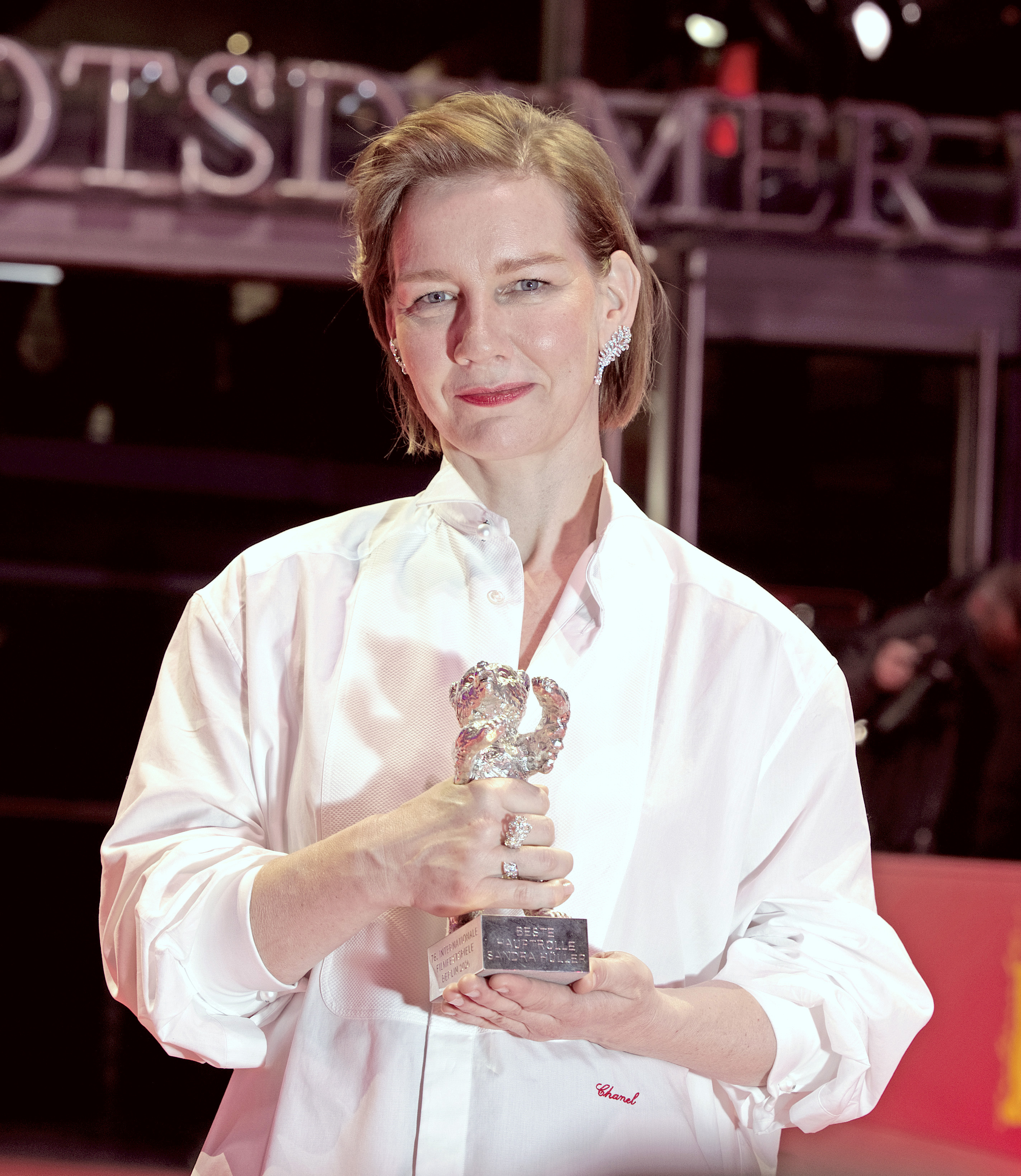
- 2026 recipient: Sandra Hüller
- Awarded for: Best Leading Performance
- Country: Germany
- Presented by: Berlin International Film Festival
- First award: 2021
- Currently held by: Sandra Hüller; Rose (2026)
- Website: www.berlinale.de

The Silver Bear for Best Leading Performance (German: Silberner Bär/Beste Schauspielerische Leistung in einer Hauptrolle) is an award presented at the Berlin International Film Festival for an outstanding performance in a leading role and chosen by the jury from the films in main competition at the festival.

== History ==
At the 2021 Berlin International Film Festival, the Festival organization announced it would retire the Best Actor and Best Actress categories, adopting gender neutral categories alongside a Best Supporting Performance category. The move was met with controversy, but intensified the gender neutral categories debate in other awards shows and festivals.

Maren Eggert was the first recipient of this award for her role as Alma Felser in I'm Your Man (2021). Sandra Hüller is the most recent winner of this award for her performance in Rose (2026).

In 2023, Sofía Otero became the prize's youngest winner for 20,000 Species of Bees, at nine years old.

== Winners ==
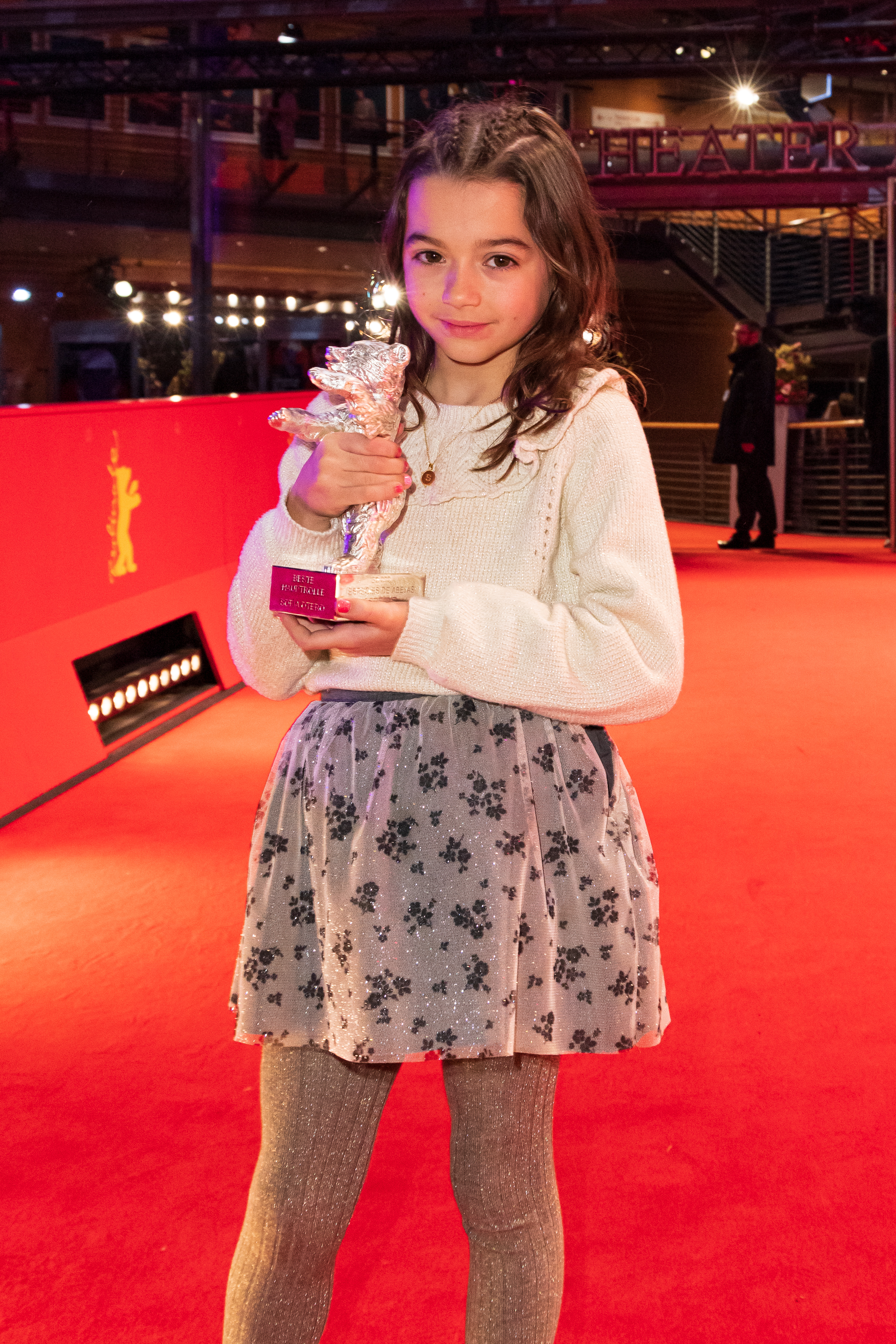
Sofía Otero won for 20,000 Species of Bees (2023).

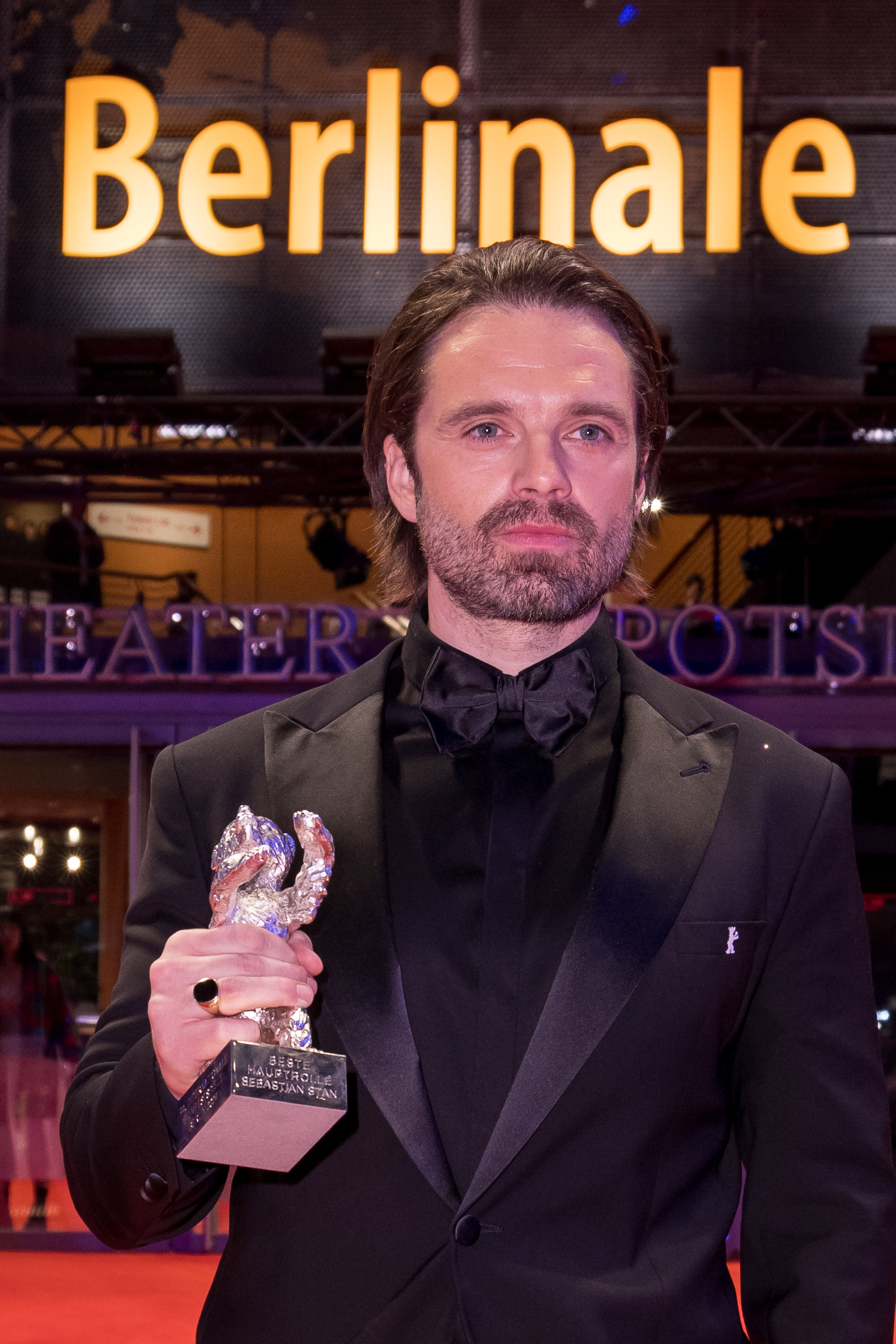
Sebastian Stan won for A Different Man (2024).

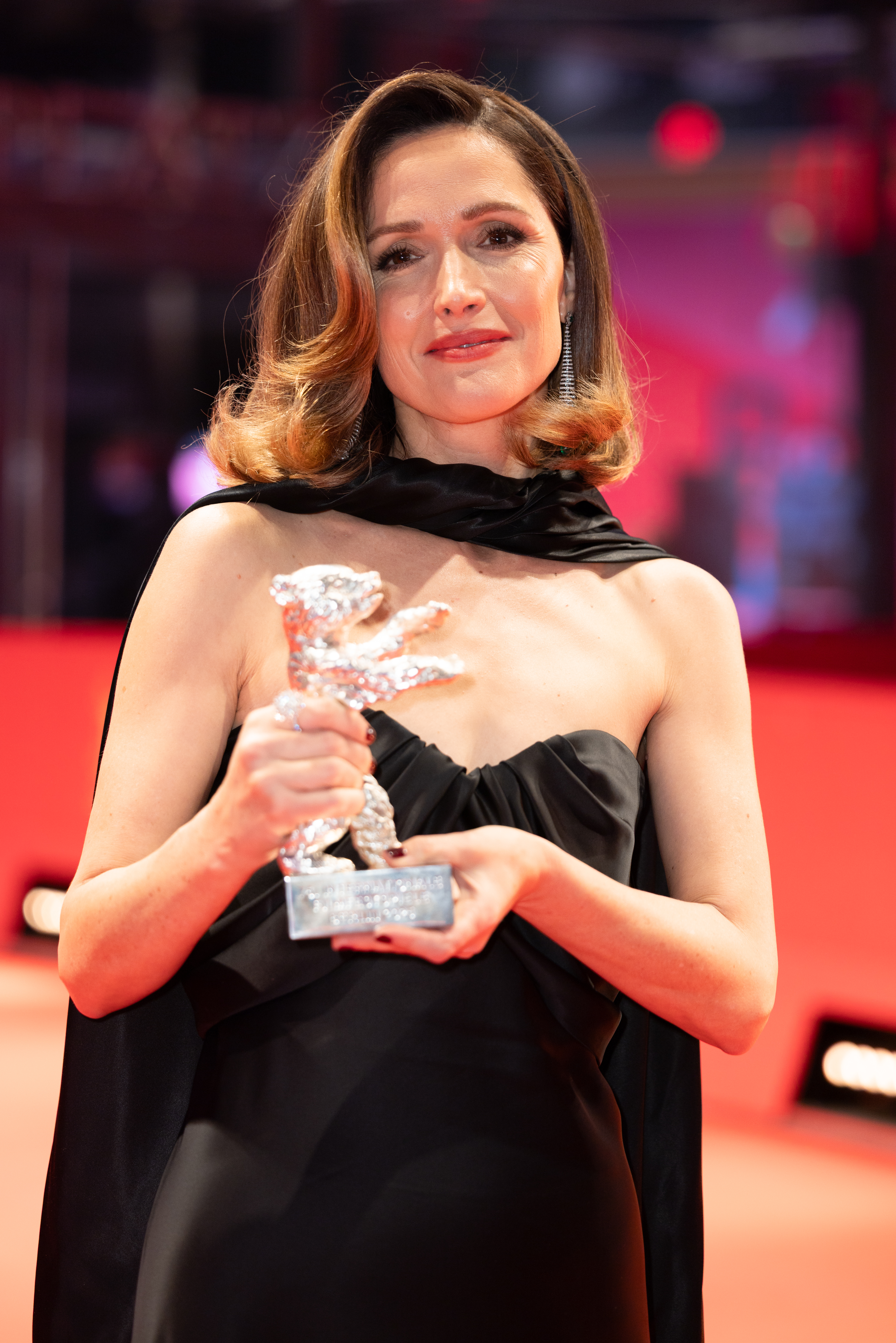
Rose Byrne won for If I Had Legs I'd Kick You' (2025).

=== 2020s ===
Year	Actor	Role	English Title	Original Title	Ref.
2021	Maren Eggert	Alma Felser	I'm Your Man	Ich bin dein Mensch	
2022	Meltem Kaptan	Rabiye Kurnaz	Rabiye Kurnaz vs. George W. Bush	Rabiye Kurnaz gegen George W. Bush	
2023	Sofía Otero	Lucía	20,000 Species of Bees	20.000 especies de abejas	
2024	Sebastian Stan	Edward	A Different Man		
2025	Rose Byrne	Linda	If I Had Legs I'd Kick You		
2026	Sandra Hüller	Rose	Rose		

== See also ==
- Silver Bear for Best Actor (1956-2020)
- Silver Bear for Best Actress (1956-2020)
- Silver Bear for Best Supporting Performance (2020-present)
