= Ike Nnaebue =

Nigerian film director and producer

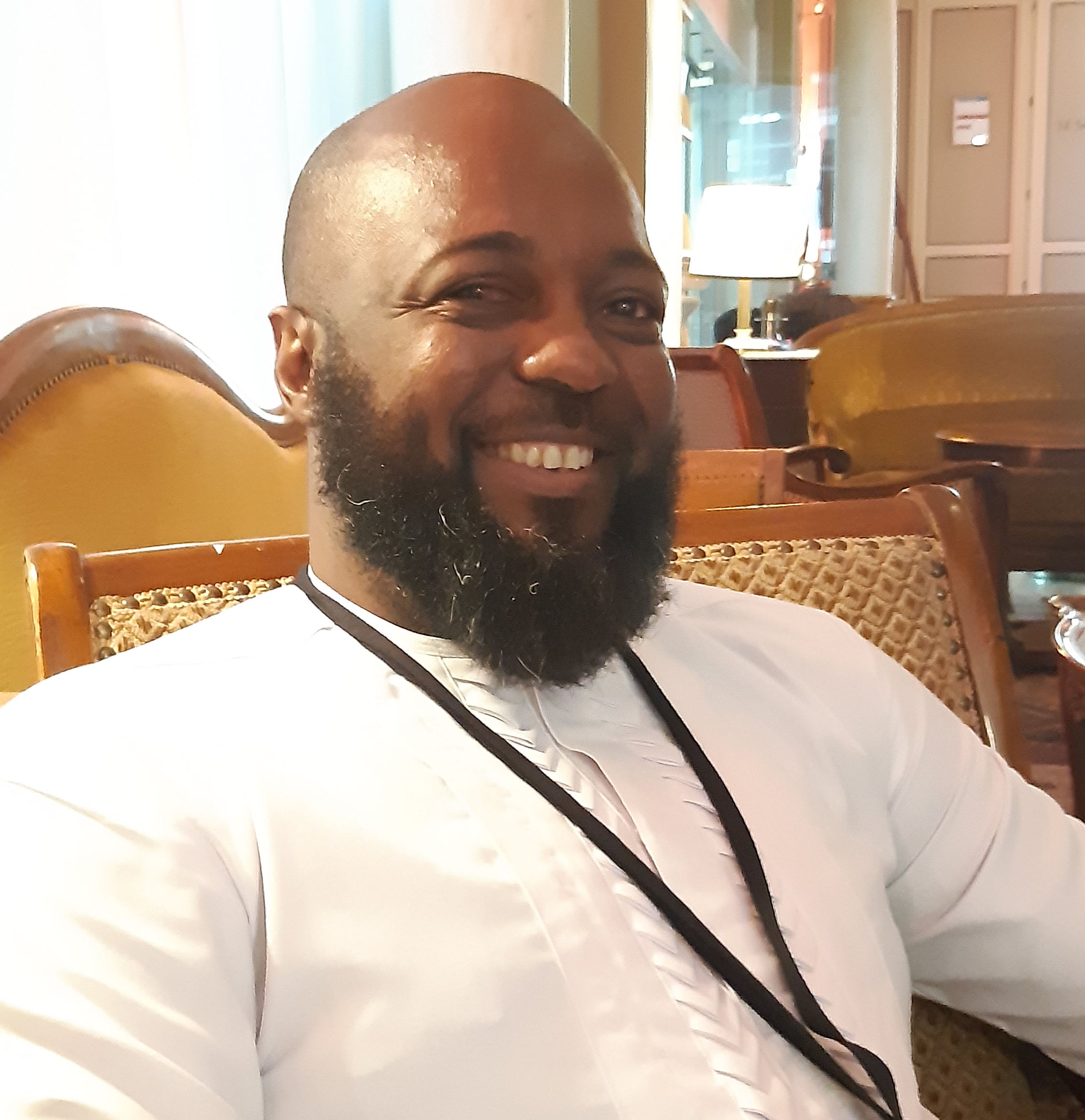
- Born: June 19, 1975 (age 51); Ojoto, Anmabra
- Years active: 2000 - Present
- Notable work: No U-Turn; Loving Daniella; Sink or Swim; False; Besieged

Ike Nnaebue (born June 19, 1975) is a Nigerian filmmaker, producer, screenwriter, and director. He is best known for the documentary film No U-turn (2022), the film received Special Mention Award at Berlinale 2022, won the Best Documentary category at the Africa Movie Academy Awards (AMAA), won the Artistic Bravery Award at the Durban International Film Festival and nominated for the Best Documentary Feature Film at the 2022 Next Generation Indie Film Awards.

He also directed False (2013), which won Golden Icon Academy Award in 2013 and the most nominated Nollywood film of 2013, and also Sink or Swim (2017), which won Best Narrative Feature at the 2017 Newark International Film Festival.

== Early life and education ==
Nnaebue was born in Ojoto, Anambra State, south-eastern Nigeria on the 19th of June 1975.

He began his formal education at the Ojoto Central Primary School and later entered an apprenticeship to learn the trade of auto spare parts. However, after completing the six-year apprenticeship, his master was unable to provide him with the customary seed funding, he then left Nigeria in an attempt to migrate to Europe by road. It was during this journey that he discovered his passion for filmmaking. Upon returning to Nigeria two years later, following a failed attempt to reach Europe via the trans-Sahara highway, he went to Jos. There, he began a new two-year apprenticeship in filmmaking under the mentorship of Sani Muazu, a lecturer at the Nigerian Film Institute in Jos.

== Career ==
Nnaebue's filmmaking career began with his first commercial move False in 2013 which he wrote and directed and won the Golden Icon Academy Award out of three nominations.

His movie, Sink or Swim won Best Narrative Feature at the 2017 Newark International Film Festival and was nominated at the Africa Movie Academy Awards. In 2017, he wrote and directed Loving Daniella, a movie which explores love and mental illness starring Joseph Benjamin, Theresa Edem earned three nominations at the Las Vegas Black Film Festival and claimed the Best Actress trophy.

His debut documentary feature 'No U-Turn', which retraces his own perilous migration journey from Lagos to Europe in the 1990s, shedding light on the hopes, dreams, and desperation of young Africans seeking better opportunities was premiered in 2022 and earned many awards which include the Artistic Bravery Award at the Durban International Film Festival, Best Film on ECOWAS Integration at FESPACO, Best Documentary Film at the El Ojo Cojo International Film Festival, as well as Best Documentary Film at the African Movie Academy Awards (AMAA) and the Africa International Film Festival (AFRIFF).

He is the founder and CEO of LP House of Creatives, an initiative aimed at building a network of creative hubs across Africa where he aims to foster artistic growth and cultural exchange on the continent. And the co-founder of Eastern Nigeria Film and Arts Initiative where he supports young filmmakers.

== Filmography ==
Year	Film	Role			Notes
Year	Film	Producer	Director	Writer	Notes
2013	False	No	Yes	Yes	Got 12 nominations and one win
2014	A Long Night	Yes	Yes	Yes	Got two nominations at AMAA
2015	The Other Side	Yes	Yes	Yes	Starring Actor won an award at AMVCA
2022	Loving Daniella	Yes	Yes	No	got nominated at AMVCA in 2023
2022	First Class	Yes	Yes	Yes	got two nominations and actress was nominated at AMVCA
2022	No U-Turn	No	Yes	Yes	Got 5 awards
