= Three Tidy Tigers Tied a Tie Tighter =

2022 Brazilian film

- Portuguese: Três Tigres Tristes
- Directed by: Gustavo Vinagre
- Written by: Tainá Muhringer; Gustavo Vinagre
- Produced by: Luiza Ramos
- Starring: Isabella Pereira; Jonata Vieira; Pedro Ribeiro
- Cinematography: Cris Lyra
- Edited by: Rodrigo Carneiro
- Music by: João Marcos de Almeida; Marco Dutra; Caetano Gotardo
- Production companies: Carneiro Verde Filmes; Tempero Filmes do Brasil
- Distributed by: Olhar Distribuição
- Release date: February 15, 2022 (Berlinale)
- Running time: 86 minutes
- Country: Brazil
- Language: Portuguese

Three Tidy Tigers Tied a Tie Tighter (Portuguese: Três Tigres Tristes, lit. "Three Sad Tigers") is a 2022 Brazilian drama film directed by Gustavo Vinagre. The film centres on three young queer people in São Paulo who are exploring the city, against the context of a viral pandemic that infects the brain and impairs memory.

The cast includes Isabella Pereira, Jonata Vieira, Pedro Ribeiro, Gilda Nomacce, Carlos Escher, Julia Katharine, Ivana Wonder, Cida Moreira, Everaldo Pontes, Nilceia Vicente.

The film premiered in the Forum program at the 72nd Berlin International Film Festival, where it was the winner of the Teddy Award for best LGBTQ-themed feature film. The film was the winner of the Pink Dragon Jury Award at the 38th Ljubljana LGBT Film Festival.

== Cast ==
- Isabella Pereira
- Jonata Vieira
- Pedro Ribeiro
- Gilda Nomacce
- Carlos Escher
- Julia Katharine
- Ivana Wonder
- Cida Moreira
- Everaldo Pontes
- Nilceia Vicente
- Inês Brasil
