= No U-Turn (film) =

2022 Nigerian film

- Directed by: Ike Nnaebue
- Produced by: Okechukwu Omeire
- Cinematography: Jide Akinleminu
- Edited by: Matthieu Augustin
- Music by: Ikwan Onkha
- Production companies: Generation Africa; Social Transformation and Empowerment Projects (STEPS); Passion 8 Communications; Elda Production
- Release date: 20 February 2022
- Running time: 94 minutes
- Countries: Nigeria; South Africa; France
- Languages: English; French; Igbo; Bambara; Pidgin

No U-Turn is a 2022 Nigerian biographical documentary film written and directed by Ike Nnaebue. The film reflects the real issues regarding migration and the difficulties confronted by the African immigrants.

== Synopsis ==
The film revolves around the director's personal life as he undertakes a mission to trace back his journey that he made 27 years ago when he left Nigeria as a young man in order to try and reach Europe by road, taking the route via Benin, Mali, and Mauritania to Morocco. He meets those who are taking the same trip, just as he did over the years in pursuit of a better life, and through conversations with them, he tries to understand the aspirations of young people in West Africa.

== Production ==
The film was produced by Generation Africa and it was one of the 25 films which was selected for the Generation Africa project. The film project marked the maiden feature-length documentary directorial venture for filmmaker Ike Nnaebue. The film is a co-production between Nigeria, France, South Africa and Germany. The film was also produced in collaboration with Passion 8 Communications, Elda Production and Social Transformation, Arte France and Empowerment Projects (STEPS).

== Release ==
The film was screened as a world premiere in the Panorama section at the 72nd Berlin International Film Festival on 20 February 2022. It was also premiered at the 2022 Durban International Film Festival and was also screened at the Encounters South African International Documentary Festival. The film was also screened at the 2022 Sole Luna Doc Film Festival, DocFest 2022, HRW Film Festival, 2022 Docs Against Gravity and 2022 African Diaspora International Film Festival. The film was also screened by the French-German public broadcaster Arte TV in early summer 2022.

== Accolades ==
The film was nominated along with 17 other films for the Berlinale Documentary Award. Sussane Schüle who was one of the three members as part of the international jury for the Berlinale Documentary Award honored the film with a special mention indicating the brilliant execution and filmmaking skills of the director.
