= Somewhere Over the Chemtrails =

2022 Czech comedy drama film

- Movie poster
- Directed by: Adam Koloman Rybanský
- Screenplay by: Adam Koloman Rybanský; Lukáš Csicsely
- Produced by: Pavel Vácha; Eva Pavlíčková
- Starring: Michal Isteník; Miroslav Krobot
- Cinematography: Matěj Piňos
- Edited by: Alan Sýs
- Production company: Bratři
- Distributed by: Bontonfilm
- Release date: 16 June 2022
- Running time: 87 minutes
- Country: Czech Republic
- Language: Czech
- Box office: 1,908,728 CZK

Somewhere Over the Chemtrails (Czech: Kdyby radši hořelo) is a 2022 Czech comedy-drama film co-written and directed by Adam Koloman Rybanský in his directorial debut. It was presented at 72nd Berlin International Film Festival.

== Plot ==
During the Easter market in a Czech village, a delivery van drives into the crowd, hits a resident and the driver flees. The village's volunteer fire brigade now wants to prove that they care about safety in the village. This event puts Broňa and Standa's friendship in danger: Firefighter Broňa is immediately sure that it is a terrorist attack committed by a migrant. Standa, on the other hand, approaches the incident from a different perspective. A laconic film about the causes of prejudice, racism and exclusion.

== Cast ==
- Michal Isteník as Standa
- Miroslav Krobot as Broňa
- Anna Polívková as Standa's wife
- Vladimír Škultéty
- Jiří Vymětal
- Martin Šesták
- Václav Hrzina
- Marek Pospíchal

== Production ==
Filming took a half of a year and concluded in March 2022. It took place primarily in Chvalnov-Lísky.
