= Rabiye Kurnaz vs. George W. Bush =

2022 German film by Andreas Dresen

- Film poster
- German: Rabiye Kurnaz gegen George W. Bush
- Directed by: Andreas Dresen
- Written by: Laila Stieler
- Produced by: Claudia Steffen; Christoph Friedel
- Starring: Meltem Kaptan; Alexander Scheer
- Cinematography: Andreas Höfer
- Edited by: Jörg Hauschild
- Music by: Johannes Repka; Cenk Erdoğan
- Release dates: 12 February 2022 (Berlinale); 28 April 2022 (German)
- Running time: 119 minutes
- Country: Germany
- Languages: German; Turkish; English
- Box office: $172,574

Rabiye Kurnaz vs. George W. Bush (German: Rabiye Kurnaz gegen George W. Bush) is a 2022 German-French biographical film directed by Andreas Dresen which premiered in completion at the 72nd Berlin International Film Festival on 12 February 2022. It is based on the true story of Murat Kurnaz, a young German of Turkish descent, who was unlawfully detained in Guantanamo Bay in 2001, and his mother's legal battle for his release.

== Plot ==
The film follows the titular Rabiye Kurnaz, a Turkish housewife from Bremen, Germany, as she discovers her eldest son, Murat, has been detained in Pakistan by the United States government. He is held in Guantanamo Bay detention camp, Cuba, for over five years, during which the rather temperamental Rabiye and the more reserved human rights lawyer, Bernhard Docke, launch a legal dispute in his name.

Their campaign for a fair trial takes them all the way to the Supreme Court, finally securing Murat's release in 2006, after which it comes to light that the German government had attempted to prevent his return by revoking his right of entry. Murat has been systematically tortured during his extrajudicial detainment and, as of the film's airing, has yet to receive any form of compensation or apology for his treatment.

== Cast ==
- Meltem Kaptan as Rabiye Kurnaz
- Mert Dincer as Cem Kurnaz
- Alexander Scheer as Bernhard Docke
- Charly Hübner as Marc Stocker
- Nazmi Kirik as Mehmet
- Sevda Polat as Nuriye
- Abdullah Emre Öztürk as Murat Kurnaz
- Şafak Şengül as Fadime
- Anthony Cook as Reporter

== Release ==
The film had its world premiere in competition at the 72nd Berlin International Film Festival on 12 February 2022. It had a limited international release in theaters beginning in Germany on 28 April 2022.

== Reception ==
=== Box office ===
Rabiye Kurnaz vs. George W. Bush grossed $0 in North America, and $172,574 in other territories.

=== Critical response ===
On review aggregator website Rotten Tomatoes, the film holds an approval rating of 50% based on 6 reviews from critics, with an average rating of 5.8/10.

The film was compared to similar David-and-Goliath stories such as Erin Brockovich or The Blind Side. Peter Bradshaw for The Guardian criticised its often jovial tone, while other reviewers have praised its tendency toward lightheartedness in the face of such gruelling subject matter.

=== Accolades ===
Writer Laila Stieler and actor Meltem Kaplan received awards for best screenplay and best actress in a starring role respectively at the 2022 Berlin International Film Festival.

The director, screenwriter, and cast of the film also received several nominations for the German Film Awards.
