= Travis Wilkerson =

American film director

Travis Wilkerson is an American independent film director, screenwriter, producer and performance artist. Named the "political conscience of 21st century American independent cinema," by Sight & Sound magazine, Wilkerson is heavily influenced by the Third Cinema movement, and known for films that combine "maximalist aesthetics and radical politics." This is owed, in part, to his meeting Cuban filmmaker Santiago Álvarez. Following the meeting, Wilkerson made the feature documentary Accelerated Under-Development about it.

== Films ==
Wilkerson's best known film, An Injury to One (2003), was called a "political-cinema landmark" in the Los Angeles Times. The film is an experimental documentary exploring the turn-of-century lynching of union organizer Frank Little, an I.W.W. union leader combating injustice against the Anaconda Copper Mining Company in Butte, Montana.

In 2007, Wilkerson presented the first performance art at the Sundance Film Festival: Soapbox Agitation #1: Proving Ground. The expanded cinema performance was described as "a scabrous assault on American imperialism inspired by the theoretical writings of Brecht and Lenin that featured Travis Wilkerson speechifying in between rockabilly protest songs as interpreted by "death folk" Los Angeles band Los Duggans," and "one of the only Sundance products that wasn't for sale."

His narrative-documentary hybrid, Machine Gun or Typewriter? (2015), premiered at the Locarno International Film Festival. As translated from Il Manifesto, it is a "digression on the possible dissolution of life and love in a tragicomically apocalyptic Los Angeles, a delirium that ranges between the analog and the digital by very cleverly bypassing the image itself."

The documentary Distinguished Flying Cross (2011) screened at the Yamagata International Documentary Film Festival

In January 2017, Wilkerson presented the premiere of a new "live" documentary in the New Frontier section of the Sundance Film Festival, Did You Wonder Who Fired the Gun? The Village Voice wrote, ""It's hard not to experience Did You Wonder Who Fired the Gun? and not get shivers up your spine - from fear, from anger, and from the beauty of Wilkerson's filmmaking." The same publication named it one of "The Ten Best Films at Sundance 2017." Writing in Artforum, Amy Taubin wrote: "this performance strategy had a powerful effect on both him and the audience. The power has to do with it being a personal story, told in the first-person; in sharing it with an audience, Wilkerson doesn’t let anyone, including himself, off the hook. 'This isn’t a white savior story. This is a white nightmare story….' one of the strongest works in a chilling Sundance Film Festival."

In 2021, Wilkerson premiered the film, Nuclear Family, co-directed with Erin Wilkerson, at the Berlinale.

== Other work ==
In addition to his longer works, Wilkerson has produced the short films National Archive V.1 (2001) and Pluto Declaration (2011). The former was screened at both the Toronto International Film Festival and the Musée du Louvre, and the latter was included in the Sundance Film Festival before sharing the prize for "Funniest Film" at the 50th Ann Arbor Film Festival. He also contributed a segment to the omni-bus film Far From Afghanistan (2012).

Wilkerson is the founding editor of the filmmaking journal Now! In addition to his work as a practitioner, he also teaches filmmaking, practice, and criticism. He was a visiting assistant professor in the Department of Film at Vassar College. He has previously taught at Pomona College, CalArts, and University of Colorado, Boulder.

Wilkerson is currently Associate Professor of Documentary Filmmaking at Duke Kunshan University, a liberal arts & sciences university in China.

== Honors and awards ==
- Machine Gun or Typewriter? Best International Feature Dokufest (2015)
- Creative Capital award (2015)
- Pluto Declaration 50th Ann Arbor Film Festival's Prix de Varti Funniest Film (2012)
- Distinguished Flying Cross Cinéma du réel's international Competition SCAM Prize (2011)
- Distinguished Flying Cross Yamagata International Documentary Film Festival's Special Prize in International Competition (2011)
- Nuclear Family (2021), Menciòn Especial at the 36th Edition of Mar del plata International Film Festival
- Guggenheim Fellowship (2025)
- UNDO Fellowship (2024-5)

== Filmography ==
| Year | Fim | Director | Producer | Writer |
|---|---|---|---|---|
| 1999 | Accelerated Under-development: In the Idiom of Santiago Alvarez | Yes | Yes | Yes |
| 2002 | An Injury to One | Yes | Yes | Yes |
| 2005 | Who Killed Cock Robin? | Yes | Yes | Yes |
| 2007 | Soapbox Agitation #1: Proving Ground | Yes | Yes | Yes |
| 2011 | Distinguished Flying Cross | Yes | Yes | Yes |
| 2012 | Far From Afghanistan | Yes | | Yes |
| 2013 | Los Angeles Red Squad | Yes | Yes | Yes |
| 2015 | Machine Gun or Typewriter? | Yes | Yes | Yes |
| 2017 | Did You Wonder Who Fired the Gun? | Yes | Yes | Yes |
| 2021 | Nuclear Family | Co- | Yes | Yes |
| 2024 | Through the Graves the Wind Is Blowing | Yes | Yes | Yes |
