= Erin Wilkerson =

American filmmaker (born 1982)

Erin Wilkerson (born 1982; Los Angeles) is an American filmmaker. She is the co-founder of Creative Agitation, with her partner, Travis Wilkerson. Best known for their co-directed film, Nuclear Family (2021, Berlinale premiere), which "articulates an ongoing narrative of apocalypse and the human obsession with war". And a 2025 Full Film Retrospective in Spain. She also known for her solo work, including The Second Burial (2023), which works to "interrogate power, memory, and resistance through cinematic language", that premiered at DOKUFEST and streamed on MUBI. Her work often includes analog and handmade components which have exibited at Foundación Luis Seoane. She is a scholar as well. As part of her PhD from Liverpool John Moores University as a cinematic study of invasive species, she developed the idea of 'feral filmmaking' as an expansion of Third Cinema practices. She is currently a lecturer in film/art research and practice at Duke Kunshan University.

== Honors and awards ==
- Machine Gun or Typewriter (2015), Best International Feature Dokufest (2015)
- Nuclear Family (2021), Menciòn Especial at the 36th Edition of Mar del plata International Film Festival

== Filmography ==
| Date | Name | Role | Medium | Duration |
|---|---|---|---|---|
| 2013 | Los Angeles Red Squad | Sound | Documentary Essay Film, Color | 60 min. |
| 2015 | Machine Gun or Typewriter | Writing + Cinematography | Documentary Essay Film, color | 71 min. |
| 2020 | Scents That Carry Through Walls | Director | Found Footage Essay Film, color | 8 min. |
| 2021 | Nuclear Family | Co-Director | Documentary Essay Film | 93 min. |
| 2021 | The Full Benefits of Aboriginal Equality | Director | Found Footage Film, color | 3 min. |
| 2021 | I Am Present | Director + Performer | Film of Performance | 13 min. |
| 2022 | Smoke Rides on the Wind | Director | Documentary Essay Film | 13 min. |
| 2023 | The Second Burial | Director | Documentary Essay Film | 19 min. |
| 2025 | Strange Flower | Director | Hybrid Documentary | 30 min. |
