= Meltem Kaptan =

German-Turkish comedian and author

Meltem Kaptan at the 76th Berlin International Film Festival

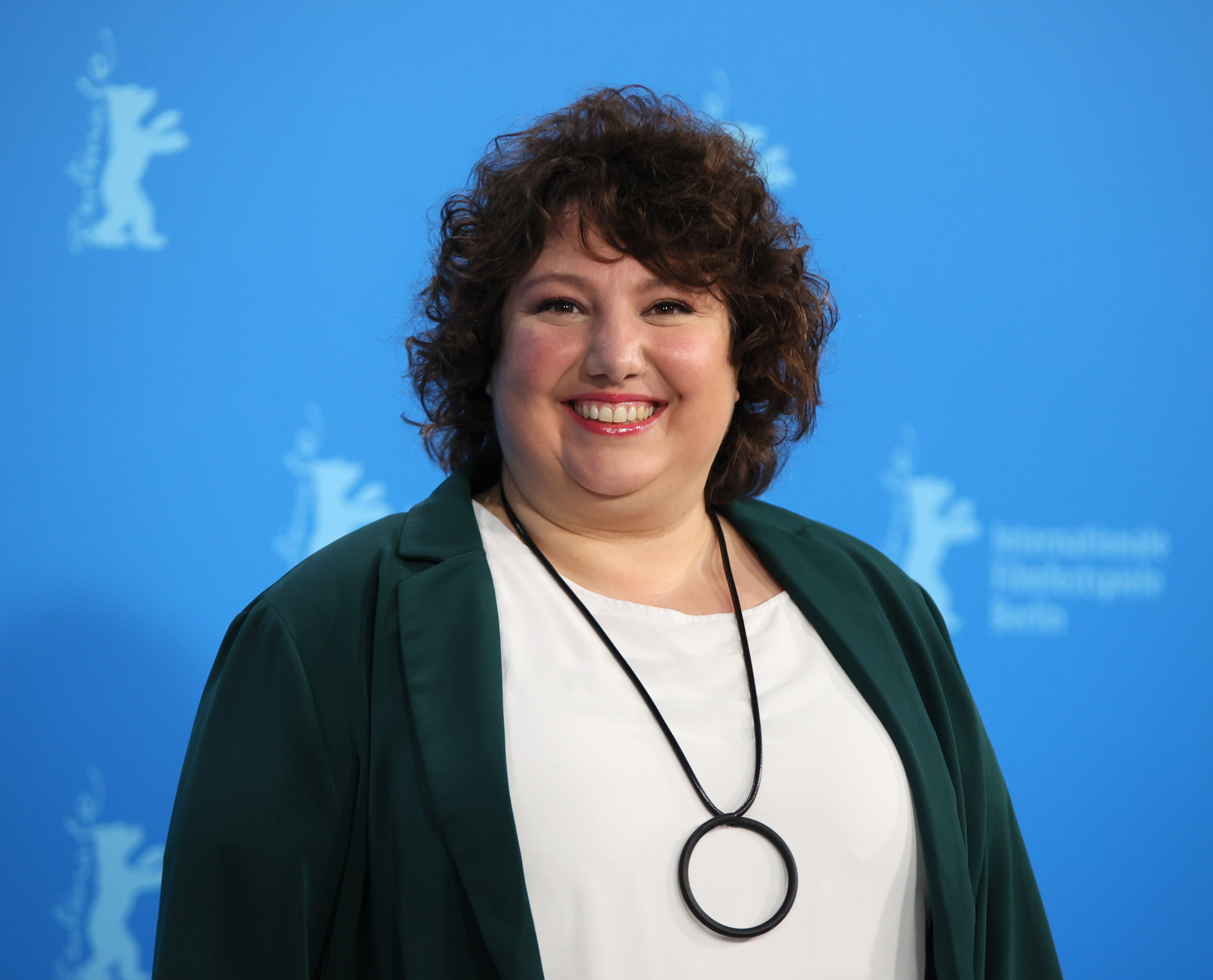
Kaptan at the 2022 Berlinale

Meltem Kaptan (born 8 July 1980 Gütersloh) is a Turkish German actress and comedian. She won a Silver Bear for Best Leading Performance at the 2022 Berlin International Film Festival.

== Life ==
She studied at Philipps University, Marburg, Boğaziçi Üniversitesy, and Western Washington University. She hosted Das große Backen (The great Bake) in 2013, and Ladies Night in 2019.

== Filmography ==
- Mortal World 2018
- Rabiye Kurnaz vs. George W. Bush 2021
