= Park Jung-hoon (cinematographer) =

South Korean filmmaker (born 1982)

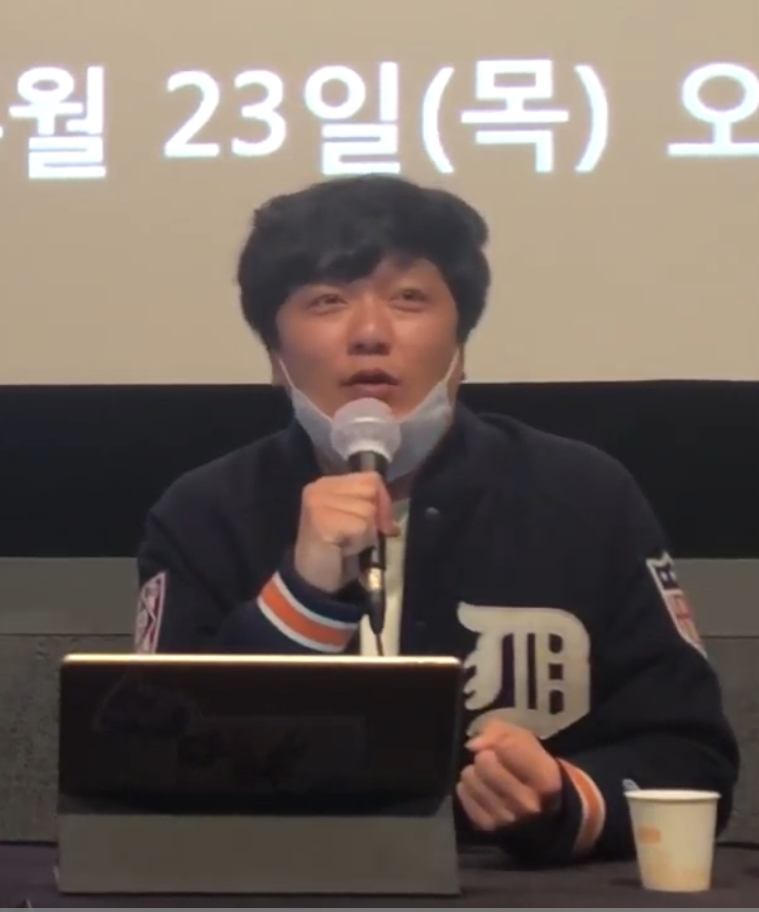
- Park Jung-hoon 2019
- Born: June 21, 1982 (age 44); Taean, South Korea
- Occupations: Cinematographer and film director
- Years active: 2002 - present
- Spouse: unknown (married 2013-present)
- Children: 1

Korean name
- Hangul: 박정훈
- Hanja: 朴正勳
- RR: Bak Jeonghun
- MR: Pak Chŏnghun

Park Jung-hoon (Korean: 박정훈, born June 21, 1982) is a South Korean cinematographer and film director. Park gained international recognition with the action thriller The Villainess, which premiered at the Cannes Film Festival in 2017. The film earned him four award nominations as Director of Photography. He has worked in the film industry for almost two decades across a variety of genres, including low-budget films, independent films, and documentaries.

== Career ==
=== Early years ===
Park Jung-hoon was born and raised in Taean, South Chungcheong Province, South Korea. His parents own a small video rental shop, so he had many opportunities to watch movies from an early age. He dreamt of working in the movie industry, but due to the high passing grade score for the Department of Film at university, going to the film department seemed like a day dream. He prepared for the entrance exam in the art major until the second grade. However, he couldn't hold his passion for movies in his heart and eventually gave up going to college.

Park moved to Seoul from his hometown of Taean to pursue a career in the film industry. At 19 years old (Korean Age), he became the youngest member of the filming team for Im Kwon-taek's 2002 movie Painted Fire or Chihwaseon.

In 2003, he worked as a filming staff of Kim Eui-suk's movie Cheongpung myeongwol, also known as Sword in the Moon. He then worked as filming staff for Im Kwon-taek's movie Low Life a.k.a. Haryu Insaeng (2004). He enlisted in mandatory military service three days after filming for Low Life. After finishing his service in 2006, he joined the crank-in for the movie Beyond the Years or Cheonnyeonhak, directed by Im Kwon-taek.

He worked as a staff member for director Zhang Lu for two movies, Desert Dream (2007) and Iri (2008). He also worked for Director Jeon Soo-il on low-budget art films such as Himalaya, Where the Wind Dwells (2008) and I Came from Busan (2010), also called Youngdo Bridge.

=== A career as director of photography ===
After building a career as a member of cinematographer teams for various works, Park made his debut as director of photography in the second work of director Kim Hee-jung, "Green Grape Candy: A Promise 17 Years Ago" in 2011. The movie was a project to commemorate the 10th anniversary of the residence at the Cannes Film Festival. The movie also won an award at the 13th Seoul International Women's Film Festival in 2011.

In the following year, Park worked as director of photography in two low-budget movies: Chubby Revolution (2012) directed by Min Doo-sik and Norigae (2012) directed by Choi Seung-ho.

He worked as director of photography on Mizo (2013) and Snowpath (2015).

In 2017, Park gained international recognition with his first commercial feature film, The Villainess. This South Korean action thriller was directed by Jung Byung-gil and stars Kim Ok-vin. The film had its world premiere at the 70th Cannes Film Festival in May 2017, where it received a four-minute standing ovation He won four awards as Director of Photography for this movie.

=== Debut as director ===
Vistari, Himalaya was Park's first feature-length film. The documentary movie was screened at the 2016 Jeonju International Festival. The movie tells the story about four musicians' trip to Nepal, people they met there, their experiences and challenges they faced, and the small but precious realizations they made.

=== Ventured into small screen ===
In 2021 Park was currently developing his first foray into television. He joined director Yoo Je-won in remake project of 2004 South Korean film Mr. Handy, Mr. Hong. Hometown Cha-Cha-Cha was a romance drama starring Shin Min-a, Kim Seon-ho and Lee Sang-yi. The 16-episode drama aired on tvN from August 28 to October 17, 2021. As a simulcast Netflix Original, it was also available for streaming on Netflix.

== Other activities ==
In the 48th Seoul Independent Film Festival of 2022, Park and cinematographers Lee Seon-yeong were selected as judges for the CGK Cinematography Award category. This award recognizes outstanding cinematographers who took part in the screenings of both the short film competition and the feature film competition. The CGK Cinematography Award is a recently established category that was introduced last year and, in 2022, received support from the Korean Cinematographers Guild.

In July 2025, Park was appointed as Cinematography Mentors of The CHANEL X BIFF ASIAN FILM ACADEMY, with director Kim Jee-woon as dean and Mattie Do named Directing Mentor. The 2025 academy received a record 625 applications from 40 countries, showing the highest national diversity since its 2005 inception. Applications and selections from female filmmakers, alongside interest from Pakistan and China, also significantly increased from the previous year. Participants will undergo a 20-day intensive training and mentoring program from September 7 to 26, producing eight short films set to premiere at the 30th Busan International Film Festival.

== Filmography ==
=== Short film ===
Short film credit(s)
Year	Title		Credited as		Note	Ref.
Year	English	Korea	Director	DoP	Note	Ref.
2006	Fact	사실	Zhang Lu	Yes (Note: with Kim Sung tae, Kim Hong-gi, and Jeon Hong-gyu)		
2008	Child of Darkness	어둠의 자식들	Song Jong-hoon	Yes		
2010	Two Nights	두개의 밤	Kim Mi-young	Yes		
2010	Moment	모멘츠	Kim Hyeon-ho	Yes		
2011	Fixed Date (Giil)	기일	Yes	No	Debut as director	
2012	Moral of My Time	내 시절의 모럴	Kim Hee-jung	Yes		
2020	Yellow Sea	황해	Yes	Yes	Produced by Zeiss Cinematography	
2020	Moraenae Fantasy YELLOW	모래내 판타지 옐로우	Yes	Yes	Produced by Canon Korea	
2023	Face that Face (Hwajang)	화장	Yes	Yes		

=== Feature films ===
Feature film credit(s)
Year	Title		Credited as			Ref.
Year	English	Korea	Director	DoP	DoP Crew	Ref.
2002	Painted Fire	취화선	Im Kwon-taek	Jeong Il-seong	Yes	
2002	Sex is Zero	색즉시공	Youn Je-kyoon	Kim Yung-chul	Yes (Note: Cinematography Dept. - Shooting team B)	
2002	The Garden of Heaven	하늘 정원	Lee Dong-hyun	Lee Seung-u	Yes	
2003	Sword in the Moon	청풍명월	Kim Eui-suk	Mun Yong-shik	Yes	
2004	Low Life	하류인생	Im Kwon-taek	Jeong Il-seong	Yes	
2006	Beyond the Years	천년학	Im Kwon-taek	Jeong Il-seong	Yes	
2006	The Bicycle Thief	자전거 도둑	Yu Geol-ki	Yun Seong-won	Yes	
2007	The Obese Family	비만가족	Kim Jung-wook	Kim Hong-gi	Yes	
2007	Little Prince	최종현	Choi Jong Hyeon	Kim Hong-min	Yes	
2007	Desert Dream	경계	Zhang Lu	Kim Sung-tae	Yes	
2008	Iri	이리	Zhang Lu	Kim Sung-tae	Yes	
2008	Himalaya, Where the Wind Dwells	히말라야, 바람이 머무는 곳	Jeon Soo-il	Kim Sung-tae	Yes	
2009	Tidal Wave or Haeundae	해운대	Yoon Je-kyoon	Kim Yeong-ho	Yes	
2010	I Came from Busan or Youngdo Bridge	영도다리	Jeon Soo-il	Kim Sung-tae	Yes	
2010	End of Animal	짐승의 끝	Jo Sung-hee	Baek Moon-soo	Yes	
2010	The Cane	회초리	Park Kwang-woo	Yoo Byung-jae	Yes	
2011	Pink	헤드 핑크	Jeon Soo-il	Kim Sung-tae	Yes	
2011	HEAD	조운	Cho-un	Kim Gi-tae	Yes	
2011	Grape Candy (Cheongpodo Satang)	청포도 사탕: 17년 전의 약속	Kim Hee-jung	Yes	No	
2012	Chubby Revolution	통통한 혁명	Min Doo-sik	Yes	No	
2012	Norigae	노리개	Choi Seung-ho	Yes	No	
2013	The Punisher	신동엽	Jai Ho-shin	Kim Hong-gi	Yes (Note: Cinematography Dept - Filming Support)	
2013	Mizo (film)	미조	Nam Ki-wong	Yes	No	
2014	Rosa	로사	Maeng Gwan-Pyo	Kim Hong-gi	Yes	
2015	Snowpath	설행_눈길을 걷다	Kim Hee-jung	Yes	No	
2017	Hakuna Matata Pole Pole or Beautiful Voice	뷰티풀 보이스	Kim Sun-ung	Kim Hong-gi	Yes	
2017	The Villainess	악녀	Jung Byung-gil	Yes	No	
2018	Door Lock	도어락	Lee Kwon	Yes	No	
2018	Herstory	허스토리	Min Kyu-dong	Yes	No	
2018	Vistari, Himalaya	비스타리, 히말라야	Yes	Yes	No	
2019	A French Woman (2019 film)	프랑스 여자	Kim Hee-jung	Yes	No	
2019	Fukuoka	후쿠오카	Zhang Lu	Yes	No	
2020	Samjin Company English Class	삼진그룹 영어토익반	Lee Jong-pil	Park Se-seung	Yes	
2020	Voice of Silence	소리도 없이	Hong Eui-jung	Yes	No	
2021	Yanagawa	야나가와	Zhang Lu	Yes	No	
2022	Confidential Assignment 2: International	공조2: 인터내셔날	Lee Seok-hoon	No	Yes	
2022	Excellent	우수	Oh Se-hyeon	Yes (Note: with Ha Ji-kyun)	No	
2023	Where Would You Like to Go?	어디로 가고 싶으신가요	Kim Hee-jung	Yes	No	
2024	Mission: Cross	크로스	Lee Myeong-hun	Yes	No	
2024	In the Realm of Ripley	아파트: 리플리의 세계	Chae Soo-eung	Yes	No	
2024	Victory	빅토리	Park Beom-soo	Yes	No	
2024	Dirty Money	더러운 돈에 손대지 마라	Kim Min-soo	Yes	No	
2025	Nocturnal	브로큰	Kim Jin-hwang	Yes	No	

=== Television ===
Television series credit(s)
Year	Title		Network	Credited as		Note	Ref.
Year	English	Korea	Network	Director	DoP	Note	Ref.
2021	Hometown Cha-Cha-Cha	갯마을 차차차	tvN; Netflix	Yoo Je-won	Yes	1st television drama series	

== Awards and recognitions ==
List of awards and nominations
Award		Year	Category	Recipient	Result	Ref.
38th	Blue Dragon Film Awards	2017	Best Cinematography and Lighting (Note: with Lee Hae-won)	The Villainess	Nominated	
26th	Buil Film Awards	2017	Best Cinematography	The Villainess	Won	
30th	Buil Film Awards	2020	Best Cinematography	Voice of Silence	Nominated	
18th	Busan Film Critics Awards	2017	Technical Award (Note: with Kwon Ki-daek)	The Villainess	Won	
54th	Grand Bell Awards	2017	Best Cinematography	The Villainess	Won	
8th	Wildflower Film Awards	2021	Best Cinematography	A French Woman	Won	
