= The King's Letters =

- Theatrical release poster
- Hangul: 나랏말싸미
- RR: Naranmalssami
- MR: Naranmalssami
- Directed by: Jo Chul-hyun
- Written by: Lee Song-won; Geum Jung-yeon
- Starring: Song Kang-ho; Park Hae-il; Jeon Mi-seon
- Production company: Doodoong Pictures
- Distributed by: Megabox Plus M
- Release date: July 24, 2019
- Running time: 110 minutes
- Country: South Korea
- Languages: Korean; Japanese
- Box office: $6.5 million

The King's Letters (Korean: 나랏말싸미; RR: Naranmalssami; lit. 'Language of the Country') is a 2019 South Korean historical drama film released on 24 July 2019. Set in the early Joseon Dynasty, it depicts Sejong the Great and Shinmi as main characters in creating Hangul. The film was directed by Jo Chul-hyun, and stars Song Kang-ho, Park Hae-il, Jeon Mi-seon, Choi Deok-moon, and Jung Hae-kyun. It grossed US$6.5 million worldwide.

== Plot ==
In mid-15th century C.E., the king of Joseon, Sejong the Great, wants to create a simple writing system so the general population can obtain literacy. Up to this point, the Joseon dynastic kingdom has been using Chinese characters.

Sejong calls upon a Buddhist monk, Shinmi, and his fellow monks to develop a new alphabet. The monks have unique insights due to their knowledge of Sanskrit and other languages that use phonetic writing systems. Sejong promises to build a Buddhist temple if the monks accomplish the task. Queen Soheon is secretly a Buddhist and welcomes the monks to the palace. Due to the tensions between Buddhists and the dominant Confucians, the servants are sworn to secrecy and the monks are disguised as court eunuchs.

The difficult project worsens Sejong's fragile health, as he suffers from diabetes. He loses sight in his right eye and is urged by his doctors to avoid stress. The king relocates to a health spa in the mountains. In the remote location, he simultaneously receives eye treatments and the monks continue to work in total secrecy. They soon complete the writing system, now known as the Hangul or Chosŏn'gŭl.

The king returns to the palace and contends with the power struggle between Buddhists and Confucians. Both groups want credit for the writing system's creation within a published manual. The Buddhists expect Sejong to hold up his end of their deal. The Confucians are desperate to keep their power and remain on good terms with China. The king gives in to the Confucians and sends the Buddhist monks away.

In order to reunite the Sejong and Shinmi, the queen starves herself to death. Sejong is grief-stricken and decides to fulfill his wife's final wishes. Shinmi is recalled to the royal palace and there is a reconciliation. The king builds the promised Buddhist temple and Shinmi leads a funeral for the late Queen Soheon.

King Sejong notes he has been king for thirty years and will leave only one book as his legacy. Shinmi replies with an allegory that suggests Sejong's one book will have an incalculable effect upon Korean society.

== Cast ==
- Song Kang-ho as King Sejong the Great
- Park Hae-il as Buddhist monk Shinmi
- Jeon Mi-seon as Queen Soheon
- Choi Deok-moon as Jung In-ji
- Nam Moon-chul as Choe Man-ri
- Jung Hae-kyun as Go Yak-hae
- Jung In-kyum as Kim Moon
- Kim Joon-hak as King Munjong
- Cha Rae-hyung as Grand Prince Suyang
- Yoon Jung-il as Grand Prince Anpyeong
- Tang Jun-sang as Hak-jo
- Keum Sae-rok as Lee Jin-ah
- Im Sung-jae as Hak-yul
- Oh Hyun-kyung as Noh-seung
- Park Dong-hyuk as Jung Chang-son
- Song Sang-eun as Pyung-nyu

== Controversy ==
Upon release, the film was subject to criticism and review bombing in Korea, as the official account taught in Korean history textbooks is that King Sejong was the sole creator of Hangul. The film was therefore accused of distorting history, by downplaying the role of King Sejong who is deeply revered in the country.

== See also ==
- Forbidden Dream
- Hunminjeongeum
