= Mi Kwan Lock =

French actress

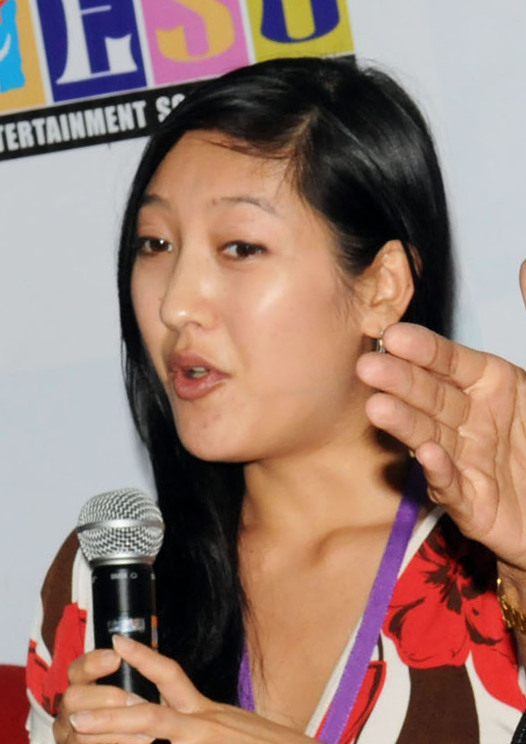
- Lock at the IFFI (2010)
- Born: Mulhouse, France
- Occupation: Actress
- Notable work: Actress in film, A Korean in Paris

Mi Kwan Lock is a French actress.

== Biography ==
Lock was born in Mulhouse, France. She is of Chinese desecent and from the age of 10 grew up in Madagascar. She resides in Paris, France. She lived in Los Angeles, USA, from 2017 to 2020. She won the "Artist of the year" Award at the UP(st)ART Awards 2018.

She plays the female lead in the 2015 film A Korean in Paris directed by Jeon Soo-il which screened at the 20th Busan International Film Festival and at the Palm Springs Film Festival.

She plays the leading female role in several films by director Christian Lara including The Legend featuring Barry Primus, Summer in Provence which screened at the Pan African Film Festival and Esclave et Courtisane which screened at the FESPACO and on TV5 Monde.

Lock has studied with Blanche Salant in Paris, France as well as with Jack Waltzer from the Actors Studio. She made her directorial, producer, and scriptwriter debut with the award-winning short film “Red Karma”.

She hosted the 2015 Paris Shanghai Film Festival (France), was a member of the jury at the 3rd Film Festival of the Lagoons (Ivory Coast), was president of the jury at cal of Carros (France) in 2015, then a judge of the 2021 Future Drifter Screenwriting contest, jury of the 2022 Festival du Film Merveilleux under the patronage of UNESCO, the 2023 Paris International Film Festival and most recently, Mi Kwan was a jury member at the 2023 Fantasy Film Festival (Paris, France).

== Filmography ==
- Noce de muguet – Laetitia (2023)
- Le nouveau jouet – Cadre (2022)
- Le pangolin – Hui (2021)
- Rat Trap – Chef (2019)
- Extra Ordinary – Dr Edi (2019)
- Trivial Pursuit – Sheehy (2019)
- Meta – Xiao Li (2018)
- Red Karma – Elle (2018)
- A Korean in Paris – Chang (2015)
- Mooncake – La soeur (2014)
- Summer in Provence – Lilly Chang (2012)
- The Legend – Benedicte Coen Schneidre (2012)
- Un Mari Idéal – Carine (2012)
