= Glittering Days =

Glittering Days may refer to:

- Glittering Days (TV series) (東方之珠), 2006 Hong Kong TV series
- Glittering Days (film) (万家灯火), 2009 Chinese film
- The Glittering Days (星光灿烂), 2010 Malaysian-Singaporean TV series
