= Confession of Murder =

2012 South Korean film

- Theatre release poster
- Hangul: 내가 살인범이다
- Hanja: 내가 殺人犯이다
- Lit.: I Am the Murderer
- RR: Naega sarinbeomida
- MR: Naega sarinbŏmida
- IPA: [nɛka salinpʌmita]
- Directed by: Jung Byung-gil
- Screenplay by: Jung Byung-gil
- Produced by: Lee Yong-hee; Jang Won-seok; Yoo Jeong-hoon
- Starring: Jung Jae-young; Park Si-hoo; Bae Seong-woo; Jung Hae-kyun; Kim Young-ae; Choi Won-young; Jo Eun-ji
- Cinematography: Kim Ki-tae; Jeong Yong-geon
- Edited by: Nam Na-yeong
- Music by: Kim Woo-geun
- Production companies: Dasepo Club; Showbox / Mediaplex
- Distributed by: Showbox / Mediaplex
- Release date: 8 November 2012 (South Korea)
- Running time: 119 minutes
- Country: South Korea
- Language: Korean
- Box office: US$21,701,525

Confession of Murder (Korean: 내가 살인범이다; lit. 'I Am the Murderer') is a 2012 South Korean action thriller film written and directed by Jung Byung-gil. Inspired by the Hwaseong serial murders. The film stars Jung Jae-young, Park Si-hoo, Bae Seong-woo, Jung Hae-kyun, Kim Young-ae, Choi Won-young and, Jo Eun-ji.The film depicts a man who claims responsibility on a book I Am the Murderer he publishes for a serial murder case 15 years ago which have fallen out of the statute of limitations, and a police officer who failed to capture the criminal of its case.

Produced by Dasepo Club and Showbox under presented by Showbox, the film is Jung's first mainstream feature; he first drew notice for his 2008 documentary film about Korean stunt men, Action Boys. It was released on November 8, 2012 distributed by Showbox.

== Plot ==
In 1990, detective Choi Hyeong-goo hunts down a serial killer who has killed 10 women since 1986, and whom he suspects is responsible for the kidnapping of another. He managed to hunt down the killer. After a fierce fight that leaves Choi nearly dead and permanently scarred, the killer escapes, but not before Choi shoots him in the shoulder.

In 2005, 15-year after the last victim's murder, the expiration date for the statute of limitations approaches, which will render prosecution impossible. Choi is an alcoholic, haunted by his failure to solve the case. He receives a call from Jung Hyun-sik, a family member of one of the victims. Choi rushes to his apartment, only to see Jung throw himself off a roof and crash through the windshield of a passing bus.

Two years later, a man called Lee Doo-seok releases a book titled I Am the Murderer, claiming responsibility for the 10 murders. His book contains detailed descriptions of the crimes, and he has a gunshot scar on his shoulder. The book becomes a bestseller because of the author's charming looks, the vicious nature of the crimes, and his claims of repentance. Lee stages public visits to the homes of family members to beg for forgiveness and even visits Choi at his precinct. Choi, however, dismisses Lee as an imposter.

As the media frenzy surrounding Lee increases, family members of the victims gather to plot their revenge, led by Han Ji-soo, whose daughter Soo-yeon was the still-missing 11th victim. They release snakes into Lee's hotel swimming pool, resulting in him getting bitten. The family members then pose as a paramedic unit sent to take Lee to the hospital. They are pursued by members of Lee's security unit, as well as Choi, but eventually get away with an unconscious Lee.

Choi recognizes the kidnappers but doesn't inform his colleague. Instead, he tracks down their safehouse and stages a daring rescue, much to the consternation of the family members. Choi leaves Lee in a motel room with a note warning him against making a fuss about the incident. Lee tells the media that the kidnappers were overzealous fans and that he will not press charges.

A television station invites Choi and Lee to be on a debate show to discuss the case. During the show, a man calling himself J speaks to Lee over the phone and reveals many personal facts about Choi. J then claims he is the real killer. Choi traces the call. Lee leaves the station and is shot by another family member, resulting in him being hospitalized again. The phone call is traced to Choi's mother's house. There, Choi finds a videotape of the 11th victim Soo-yeon, who was also his girlfriend, being tied up and killed.

After scrutinizing the tape, Choi announces in a press conference that it is unclear whether Lee or J is the killer. Lee continues to insist that he is the real killer, and another television debate is arranged between him, Choi, and J to settle the matter. The debate draws thousands of protestors and fans, as well as Han, who carries a pen filled with snake venom, intent upon using it on the real killer.

J arrives and directs everyone's attention to a camera crew who finds his 11th victim, Soo-yeon, proving he is the real killer. Lee makes his own revelation, admitting that he is not the killer and he also did not write the book. Lee is actually Jung Hyun-sik, who faked his death with Choi's help and underwent plastic surgery to assume a new identity. They worked together to lure out the real killer, with Choi writing the book with his knowledge of the crimes, and Lee acting as the "face."

Although surprised at the elaborate scheme, J claims that Choi cannot do anything to him, as the statute of limitations has long expired. Choi plays the tape of Soo-yeon's demise, revealing the footage was shot in that exact date in 1992, and that he has 14 minutes before the statute of limitations expires.

J taunts Choi by saying Soo-yeon carries J's child before her death. The enraged Choi attempts to kill J, but J escapes the TV station, leading to another intense chase scene. Choi finally catches up to J and is stopped short from killing him. As J is escorted away in handcuffs, both Hyun-sik and Ji-soo try to kill him, but Choi stabs J with the pen preventing another person from committing murder. In 2012, Choi is released from prison, greeted by the media and the victims's grateful family members. Due to the case, the statute of limitations was extended to 25 years.

== Cast ==
- Jung Jae-young as Choi Hyeong-goo, a police detective
- Park Si-hoo as Lee Doo-seok / Jung Hyun-sik
- Bae Seong-woo as Detective Gwang-Soo
- Jung Hae-kyun as J
- Kim Young-ae as Han Ji-soo, the mother of one victim
- Choi Won-young as Jeong Tae-seok, the brother of one victime
- Jo Eun-ji as Choi Kang-sook, the daughter of one victim
- Min Ji-ah as Kang Soo-yeon, Hyeong-goo's girlfriend and Ji-soo's daughter
- Kim Jong-goo as Mr. Choi, Kang-sook's father and the husband of one victim
- Oh Yong as Kang Do-hyuk, the son of one victim
  - Han Sa-myung as young Do-hyuk
- Lee Bong-ryun as High School girl
- Jang Gwang as a chief producer in the TV broadcasting company
- Lee Jae-goo as Director Park as a TV program director
- Kim Min-sang as Jeong Min-kwon
- Ryoo Je-seung as Jung Hyun-sik
- Cha Chung-hwa as Jang Jin-gak

== Reception ==
The film received positive review ratings on local Internet portals, and sold 1.2 million tickets in its first week of release. Despite being rated 18, it sold two million tickets by its 18th day of release. It was scheduled to be released in Japan in 2013.

The film ranked second and grossed ₩5,458,263,251 in its first week of release, and grossed a total of ₩19,955,985,636 domestically after six weeks of screening.

== Remakes ==
The film was remade in 2017 as Memoirs of a Murderer by Yu Irie, starring Hideaki Itō and Tatsuya Fujiwara in the lead roles.

The film was remade as a South Indian Malayalam film Angels directed by Jean Markose starring Indrajith. It was a moderate success and hit.

An American remake is in development at Universal Pictures.

== Awards and nominations ==
2013 Baeksang Arts Awards

- Best Screenplay – Jung Byung-gil

2013 Grand Bell Awards

- Best New Director – Jung Byung-gil
- Nomination – Best New Actor – Park Si-hoo
- Nomination – Best Cinematography – Kim Ki-tae
- Nomination – Best Editing – Nam Na-yeong

2013 Brussels International Fantastic Film Festival

- Thriller Competition Winner

2014 Golden Cinema Festival

- Silver Medal for Cinematography – Kim Ki-tae
