= Christian Lara =

Christian Lara may refer to:

- Christian Lara (footballer) (born 1980), Ecuadorian footballer
- Christian Lara (film director) (born 1939), Guadeloupean/French film director, writer, cinematographer and producer
