= Carter (film) =

South Korean action thriller Netflix film

- Promotional poster
- Hangul: 카터
- RR: Kateo
- MR: K'at'ŏ
- Directed by: Jung Byung-gil
- Written by: Jung Byung-gil; Jung Byeong-sik
- Produced by: Jung Byung-gil; Jung Byeong-sik
- Starring: Joo Won; Lee Sung-jae; Jeong So-ri; Kim Bo-min
- Distributed by: Netflix
- Release date: August 5, 2022
- Running time: 132 minutes
- Country: South Korea
- Languages: Korean; English
- Budget: ₩30 billion

Carter (Korean: 카터) is a 2022 South Korean action thriller film directed by Jung Byung-gil, who co-wrote the film with Jung Byeong-sik. The film stars Joo Won, Lee Sung-jae, Jeong So-ri and Kim Bo-min.

Carter was released on August 5, 2022 by Netflix, where it received mixed to negative reviews from critics who praised the action sequences, cinematography and Joo Won's performance, but criticized its plot and screenwriting.

== Plot ==
In the midst of a deadly pandemic caused by a virus that makes the infected patients violent and zombie-like, which originates from the DMZ and which has already devastated the U.S. and North Korea, a man awakes in a blood-soaked bed at a motel room in Seoul with a cross-shaped scar on the back of his head. CIA agents arrive and demand he reveal the location of Dr. Jung Byung-ho. With no recollections of his past, the man doesn't know his or Dr. Jung's identity. A female voice inside his ear tells him that his name is Carter and he needs to accept her directions if he wants to live.

Following the female voice's instructions, Carter escapes the room and enters a public bath where nearly a hundred gangsters attack and try to kill him but Carter survives their assault with his lethal fighting skills. Inside a van of NIS agents, the female voice reveals herself as Han Jung-hee who works for North Korea's Labor Party, which has partnered with South Korea to create a treatment for the virus. Dr. Jung Byung-ho, who successfully cured his own infected daughter Ha-na, leads the project using one of her antibodies. On the way to a lab in North Korea Ha-na went missing and was presumably kidnapped by the CIA.

Carter's mission is to rescue Ha-na and bring her back to the North Korean facility where the production of a vaccine is underway. When questioned about his identity and involvement in this mission, Carter is told that he is a South Korean-born naturalized citizen of North Korea who has decided to take part in the mission to save his own infected daughter but the CIA agents approach him and claim that he is actually a former spy named Michael Bane who was believed to have died during a mission in Syria. After a series of fights against numerous adversaries, Carter manages to arrive in North Korea with Ha-na where they meet Han Jung-hee and her superior North Korean General Kim Jong-hyeok.

Before Carter can complete his mission and get his memories back, General Kim betrays Jung-hee and Carter to launch a military coup against the North Korean government. While Ha-na is a captive of Kim's forces and Kim works to convince Jung-hee to join the coup, Carter escapes from the soldiers assigned to kill him and follows Kim and Jung-hee to a biomedical facility where Ha-na has been imprisoned but has also been reunited with her father, Dr. Jung. Carter learns that Jung-hee is his wife and shoots Kim who threatens Jung-hee with a gun. At the same facility, they rescue their infected daughter, Yoon-hee, who behaves violently and attacks Jung-hee. Dr. Jung injects Yoon-hee with an antidote, which makes her temporarily unconscious. After fighting against the infected patients and Kim's soldiers, they escape the facility in a jeep.

Carter, Jung-hee, Yoon-hee, Dr. Jung and Ha-na hope to catch a train, operated by the Chinese government, that is carrying infected people to Dandong. On the way, Jung-hee and Dr. Jung restore Carter's memories by activating a device implanted in the back of his head. Carter remembers that he agreed to this mission in exchange for his family's freedom and that he suggested blocking his memories to ensure that he couldn't betray North Korea. Following a chase and combat with Kim's forces, the five finally manage to board the Chinese train. Yoon-hee wakes up, apparently cured from the disease. As the train is crossing a bridge, a bomb blast occurs, which makes the train head for a fall.

== Cast ==
- Joo Won as Carter Lee / Michael Bane
- Lee Sung-jae as Kim Jong-hyuk
- Jeong So-ri as Han Jung-hee
- Kim Bo-min as Jung Ha-na
- Byeon Seo-yun as Choi Yu-jin
- Jung Jae-young as Jung Byung-ho
- Jung Hae-kyun as Kim Dong-gyu
- Camilla Belle as Agnes
- Mike Colter as Smith
- Christina Donnelly as Agent 3

== Production ==
In March 2021, Joo Won was confirmed to be starring in the film. In May 2021, Lee Sung-jae confirmed his appearance.

Filming took place in Osong, North Chungcheong Province in late June 2021.

== Reception ==
=== Viewership ===
Within three days of release Carter recorded 27.3 million hours viewed and ranked first in Netflix's global Top 10 movie (non-English) category for the week of August 1 to 7, entering the Top 10 list in a total of 90 countries. At one point, the movie ranked in the global all-time top 10 but fell out with 65.39 million hours watched in the first 28 days.

=== Critical response ===
On the review aggregator website Rotten Tomatoes, 35% of 23 critics' reviews are positive, with an average rating of 5.0/10. Kim Na-yeon of Star News praised the direction of the action scenes, such as making the helicopter aerial battle and skydiving fight scene in live action rather than CG, and the intense action performance of Joo Won. Kim Bo-ram in her review for Yonhap News Agency praised the director for creatively weaving "breath-taking action sequences of physical combat, gun fights and large-scale helicopter stunts" but stated that the "latter part of the movie, when the true story of Carter's mission is revealed, makes the majority of the parts, including the fast-paced action scenes, almost tiring." YTN's Kang Nae-ri stated that the film fails to immerse the audience, and the tension decreases towards the second half, but praised Joo Won for his splendid action performance and digesting title role. Writing for Sports Kyunghyang, Lee Da-won criticised the director for using Joo Won's efforts in a crude way. Lee stated that the only good thing about this movie is Joo Won's action sequences but his power lasts less than 20 minutes due to the tattered story and senseless directing.

In his review for South China Morning Post, James Marsh wrote [the film's] "action feels weightless and simulated, even when propped up by Won's insanely physical performance", described the film as "dizzyingly ridiculous" and rated it 2 out of 5 stars. Rohan Naahar, writing for The Indian Express, rated the film 1 out of 5, describing it as "an action film so ridiculous that you'll often wish that you were among the scores of faceless villains whose heads are smashed to a pulp by the film's protagonist", and criticizing the film's resemblance to a video game. Writing for Mashable, Sam Haysom described the opening sequence as "dizzying, fantastically choreographed, ultra-violent, and impressively filmed" so that it "leaves you feeling sea sick and a bit drained" and stated: "The quantity and scale of action is both Carter's greatest strength and its greatest weakness. It's all very well done, but there's just too much of it." Concluding his review, Haysom wrote that the audience is "barely given time to draw a breath — and the film suffers for it."
