= Park Hae-il =

South Korean actor (born 1977)

- Park in 2026
- Born: 26 January 1977 (age 49); Seoul, South Korea
- Education: Namseoul University – English
- Occupation: Actor
- Years active: 2000–present
- Agent: Makestar
- Spouse: Seo Yoo-sun (m. 2006)
- Children: 2

Korean name
- Hangul: 박해일
- RR: Bak Haeil
- MR: Pak Haeil

Park Hae-il (Korean: 박해일; born 26 January 1977) is a South Korean actor. He began his acting career in theater, but soon gained the film industry's attention in 2003 with Scent of Love and Memories of Murder. Park's film career took off, with leading roles in notable films, including Rules of Dating (2005), The Host (2006), Moss (2010), Eungyo (2012), Whistle Blower (2014), The Last Princess (2016), The Fortress (2017), and Hansan: Rising Dragon (2022).

For his performances in the historical drama War of the Arrows (2011) and romantic thriller Decision to Leave (2022), Park received multiple Best Actor honors including the Blue Dragon Film Awards and the Grand Bell Awards.

== Career ==
Park Hae-il began appearing in theatre productions ever since childhood, and he first established himself on stage rather than on the screen. In 2000 he was awarded the Best New Actor award in the theatre category of the Baeksang Arts Awards for his role in the play Cheongchun-yechan ("Ode to Youth"). His film debut was in a minor role in Yim Soon-rye's Waikiki Brothers, however he left a major impression in his second film Jealousy Is My Middle Name, in which he played a conflicted young man who develops a fascination/hatred for his boss, who has stolen two women from him. The film won the top prize at the Busan International Film Festival in 2002, and was released commercially the following spring.

Throughout his career, Park has been cast in two different types of roles: innocent-looking, boyish characters, or else men who hide a dark streak under a nice-looking exterior. After Jealousy, Park would take on his darkest role of all in the acclaimed smash hit Memories of Murder, where he portrayed a man suspected of committing serial murder. Yet the following year he was just as effective appearing in a romantic role opposite Jeon Do-yeon in time-travel drama My Mother, the Mermaid.

In 2005, he once again played characters of completely opposite temperament. In Rules of Dating, he plays a dirty-minded, scheming high school instructor who sets his mind on a pretty student teacher played by Kang Hye-jung, while in Boy Goes to Heaven he plays a young boy who suddenly finds himself an adult one day, like Tom Hanks in Big.

2006 saw him return to work with acclaimed director Bong Joon-ho in the big-budget monster movie The Host which went on to become the best-selling Korean film of all time.

Murder mystery Paradise Murdered was a surprise hit in 2007, with Kyu Hyun Kim of Koreanfilm.org calling Park "an inspired choice for the ostensible protagonist, projecting fatigued compassion and cold calculation in equal measure, his obsidian pupils glistening with streaks of chilling obsession."

In 2008, he starred in the period drama Modern Boy, a dramatic love story set in 1930s Gyeongseong or old Seoul, when Korea was under Japanese colonization (1910–45). Park played the role of a rich, hedonistic playboy who does not care that his country was colonized, then falls head over heels in love with a beautiful and mysterious independence fighter (Kim Hye-soo).

After small supporting roles in Shim's Family (also known as Skeletons in the Closet), and Good Morning, President, Park joined the ensemble cast of A Million as one of eight participants who take part in a TV reality show in Perth, Australia but discover that they must literally survive to win the prize of 1 million dollars.

In 2010, Park headlined Kang Woo-suk's blockbuster mystery thriller Moss, playing a young man who comes to a rural village after hearing about his father's death and later becomes embroiled in its hidden secrets. Park's casting was received enthusiastically by fans of the source material, Yoon Tae-ho's hugely popular online graphic novel series.

Heartbeat explores a familial love battle of wills, as Yeon-hee (played by Yunjin Kim of Lost fame) whose daughter is in desperate need of a heart transplant, tries to convince a brain-dead patient's son (Park) to sign off on the transplant, but he refuses and instead investigates his mother's fall. He then appeared in the low-budget indie End of Animal, because he found the script "very interesting."

Park next starred in War of the Arrows, a fictional tale set in the Joseon period, which follows Nam-yi (Park) on his search for younger sister Ja-in after she is kidnapped by Qing Dynasty soldiers during an invasion. As he slays enemy soldiers with his bow and arrow, he is confronted by Jushinta, a Manchu enemy commander also well known for his archery prowess. Arrow made headlines by selling to distributors from six countries at the Cannes film market and becoming the highest-grossing Korean film of 2011. Park won Best Actor honors at the prestigious Grand Bell Awards and Blue Dragon Film Awards.

He returned to the big screen in A Muse, a film adaptation of celebrated author Park Bum-shin's sensational novel about an old poet who ends up falling for a 17-year-old girl named Eun-gyo. Upon realizing his love for the teenager, the poet goes through emotional turmoil and self-destruction, while willing to give up his fame as one of the nation's most respected literary figures. The 35-year-old actor took on the challenge of nearly eight hours of makeup daily, on top of learning the weary gait and gesture of a man in his 70s.

After Yim Pil-sung's Weekend Prince was delayed, Park starred instead in Song Hae-sung's ensemble black comedy Boomerang Family (2013), and Zhang Lu's introspective romance drama Gyeongju (2014).

In December 2022, Park decided not to renew his contract with the former agency. In April 2023, Park signed with Makestar.

In 2023, Park became a member of the Academy of Motion Picture Arts and Sciences.

== Personal life ==
Park married his longtime girlfriend Seo Yoo-seon on 11 March 2006; they have two children. Seo is a playwright and has also written an episode of KBS Drama Special titled Ji-hoon, Born in 1982.

== Filmography ==
=== Film ===
Year	Title	Role	Notes	Ref.
2001	Waikiki Brothers	young Sung-woo		
2002	Who R. U.?	Man in photograph	Bit part	
2003	Scent of Love	Seo In-ha		
2003	Jealousy Is My Middle Name	Lee Won-sang		
2003	Memories of Murder	Park Hyeon-gyu		
2004	My Mother, the Mermaid	Kim Jin-guk		
2005	Rules of Dating	Lee Yoo-rim		
2005	Boy Goes to Heaven	Bae Ne-mo		
2006	The Host	Park Nam-il		
2007	Skeletons in the Closet	Kyung-ho	Cameo	
2007	Paradise Murdered	Jae Woo-sung		
2008	Modern Boy	Lee Hae-myeong		
2009	A Million	Han Ki-tae		
2009	Good Morning, President	Man requesting a transplant	Cameo	
2010	Moss	Ryu Hae-guk		
2010	Second Half	Director Bong	Voice Cameo	
2011	Heartbeat	Lee Hwi-do		
2011	End of Animal	Baseball cap		
2011	War of the Arrows	Choi Nam-yi		
2012	Doomsday Book	RU-4 robot (voice)	Segment: "The Heavenly Creature"	
2012	A Muse	Lee Jeok-yo		
2012	Dangerously Excited	Dae-hee's brother	Cameo	
2012	The Winter of the Year Was Warm	Radio critic	Voice cameo	
2013	Boomerang Family	Oh In-mo		
2014	Gyeongju	Choi Hyeon		
2014	Santa Barbara	Reporter	Voice cameo	
2014	Whistle Blower	Yoon Min-cheol		
2014	My Dictator	Tae-sik		
2015	Love and...	1st lighting technician		
2016	The Last Princess	Kim Jang-han		
2017	The Fortress	King Injo		
2018	High Society	Jang Tae-joon		
2018	Ode to the Goose	Yoon-young		
2019	The King's Letters	Shinmi		
2021	Heaven: To the Land of Happiness	Nam-sik		
2022	Decision to Leave	Hae-jun		
2022	Hansan: Rising Dragon	Yi Sun-sin		
2026	The Assassin(s)	Jae-hwan		

Short film

Year	Title	Role
2003	Audition	Yoon Ji-seok
2009	The End	Hae-il
2011	Endless Joke	

=== Television series ===
Year	Title	Role	Notes	Ref.
1997	The Third Man		Special appearance	
2004	How to Paint the Portrait of a Bird		Span Drama episode (TV, MBC)	
2014	Plus Nine Boys	Nine victims	Cameo	

=== Music video appearances ===
Year	Song title	Artist
2000	"Dan"	Kim Don-gyu
2002	"Forever"	G. Gorilla
2003	"Did We Really Love"	Brown Eyed Soul
2019	"Light"	Bek Hyun-jin

== Theater ==
Year	Title	Role
2000	Ode to Youth	
2003	Othello	
	Family Baguette	
2003	Generation After Generation	

== Accolades ==
=== Awards and nominations ===
Year presented, name of the award ceremony, award category, nominated work and the result of the nomination
Year	Award	Category	Nominated work	Result	Ref.
2000	36th Baeksang Arts Awards	Best New Actor (Theater)	Ode to Youth	Won	
2003	40th Grand Bell Awards	Best New Actor	Scent of Love	Nominated	
2003	26th Golden Cinematography Awards	Best New Actor	Scent of Love	Won	
2003	4th Busan Film Critics Awards	Best New Actor	Jealousy Is My Middle Name	Won	
2003	11th Chunsa Film Art Awards	Best New Actor	Jealousy Is My Middle Name	Won	
2003	23rd Korean Association of Film Critics Awards	Best New Actor	Jealousy Is My Middle Name	Won	
2003	6th Director's Cut Awards	Best New Actor	Jealousy Is My Middle Name	Won	
2003	24th Blue Dragon Film Awards	Best New Actor	Jealousy Is My Middle Name	Nominated	
2003	8th Women Viewers Film Awards	Best Actor	Jealousy Is My Middle Name	Won	
2003	2nd Korean Film Awards	Best New Actor	Jealousy Is My Middle Name	Won	
2003	2nd Korean Film Awards	Best Supporting Actor	Memories of Murder	Nominated	
2004	3rd Korean Film Awards	Best Actor	My Mother, the Mermaid	Nominated	
2005	26th Blue Dragon Film Awards	Best Leading Actor	Rules of Dating	Nominated	
2005	4th Korean Film Awards	Best Actor	Rules of Dating	Nominated	
2006	42nd Baeksang Arts Awards	Best Actor – Film	Rules of Dating	Nominated	
2006	9th Director's Cut Awards	Best Actor	The Host	Won	
2007	3rd Andre Kim Best Star Awards	Best Star Award	—N/a	Won	
2008	16th Korean Culture and Entertainment Awards	Best Actor	Modern Boy	Won	
2011	15th Bucheon International Fantastic Film Festival	Actor's Award	—N/a	Won	
2011	27th Korea Best Dressed Swan Awards	Best Dressed	—N/a	Won	
2011	48th Grand Bell Awards	Best Actor	War of the Arrows	Won	
2011	32nd Blue Dragon Film Awards	Best Leading Actor	War of the Arrows	Won	
2011	19th Korean Culture and Entertainment Awards	Grand Prize (Daesang)	War of the Arrows	Won	
2012	6th Asian Film Awards	Best Actor	War of the Arrows	Nominated	
2012	48th Baeksang Arts Awards	Best Actor – Film	War of the Arrows	Nominated	
2012	7th Asia Model Awards	Asia Special Award	—N/a	Won	
2014	51st Grand Bell Awards	Best Actor	Whistle Blower	Nominated	
2014	35th Blue Dragon Film Awards	Best Leading Actor	Whistle Blower	Nominated	
2014	23rd Buil Film Awards	Best Actor	Gyeongju	Nominated	
2015	2nd Wildflower Film Awards	Best Actor	Gyeongju	Nominated	
2017	37th Golden Cinema Festival	Best Actor	The Last Princess	Won	
2017	1st Korean Screenwriter Association	Best Actor	The Last Princess	Won	
2022	27th Chunsa Film Art Awards	Best Actor	Decision to Leave	Won	
2022	31st Buil Film Awards	Best Actor	Decision to Leave	Won	
2022	58th Grand Bell Awards	Best Actor	Decision to Leave	Won	
2022	43rd Blue Dragon Film Awards	Best Leading Actor	Decision to Leave	Won	
2022	Asian Journalists Association	AJA Awards	Hansan: Rising Dragon, Decision to Leave	Won	
2022	23rd Busan Film Critics Awards	Best Actor	Decision to Leave	Won	
2022	27th Florida Film Critics Circle Awards	Best Actor	Decision to Leave	Runner-up	
2022	Cine21 Awards	Actor of the Year	Decision to Leave	Won	
2022	42nd Golden Cinematography Awards	Best Actor	Decision to Leave	Won	
2022	2022 Kinolights Awards	Actor of The Year (Domestic)	Hansan: Rising Dragon, Decision to Leave	1st	
2023	21st Director's Cut Awards	Best Actor	Decision to Leave	Won	
2023	16th Asian Film Awards	Best Actor	Decision to Leave	Nominated	
2023	59th Baeksang Arts Awards	Best Actor – Film	Decision to Leave	Nominated	
2026	47th Blue Dragon Film Awards	Best Leading Actor	The Assassin(s)	Pending	

=== Listicles ===
Name of publisher, year listed, name of listicle, and placement
Publisher	Year	Listicle	Rank	Ref.
The Screen	2009	1984–2008 Top Box Office Powerhouse Actors in Korean Movies	43rd	
The Screen	2019	2009–2019 Top Box Office Powerhouse Actors in Korean Movies	21st	
