= Baek Hyun-jin =

South Korean actor (born 1972)

- Born: Baek Hyun-jin; June 29, 1972 (age 54); Mapo District, Seoul, South Korea
- Occupations: Actor; musician; artist
- Years active: 1995–present
- Agent(s): Doodo Artists Company, Nua Entertainment
- Website: Official site

Baek Hyun-jin (Korean: 백현진; born June 29, 1972) is a South Korean actor, musician, and artist.

== Filmography ==
=== Film ===
Year	Title	Role	Ref.
2011	The Day He Arrives	Composer	
2012	Venus in Fur	—	
2012	The Heaven Is Only Open to the Single!	Director Jeon	
2012	Eungyo	Critic	
2014	Santa Barbara	Director Baek	
2014	Gyeongju	Professor Park	
2015	Love and...	Male Nurse	
2015	The Exclusive: Beat the Devil's Tattoo	Painter Kim	
2016	A Quiet Dream	Photographer	
2016	Yourself and Yours	Jin-Young	
2016	Love, Lies	Park Il-Sung	
2018	Ode to the Goose	Speaker	
2018	High Society	Writer Park	
2018	Sunset in My Hometown	Bang-Baek	
2018	Keys to the Heart	Dong-Soo	
2020	Samjin Company English Class	Managing Director Oh Tae-Young	
2021	Ten Months	Ong-Joong	
2022	Highway Family	Do-Hwan	
2022	Seoul Vibe	General Jeon	
2022	The Policeman's Lineage	Kwon Ki-An	
2022	Broker	Detective Choi	

=== Television ===
Year	Title	Role	Ref.
2017	Tomorrow, with You	Kim Yong-Jin	
2018–2019	Children of Nobody	Sung-Hwan	
2019	Welcome 2 Life	Kim Tae-Suk	
2019	My Fellow Citizens!	Baek Chang-Jin	
2021	Political Fever	Kim Sung-Nam	
2021	Happiness	Oh Joo-Hyeong (#601)	
2021	The Devil Judge	Heo Joong-Se	
2021	Taxi Driver	Chairman Park Yang-Jin	
2021–2022	The One and Only	Ha Yong-Geun	
2022	Gaus Electronics	Ki Sung-Nam	
2023	The Good Bad Mother	Baek Hoon-Ah	
2023	Moving	Jung Sang-Jin (Jincheon)	
2024	The Auditors	Yang Jae-Seung	
2024	Crash	Koo Kyung-Mo	
2024	Goodbye Earth	Cho Gwang-Hyun	
2025	Nine Puzzles	Lee Gang-Hyun	
2025	Mary Kills People	Gu Gwang-Chul	
2026	Dead-End Job	Byeon Min-su	

=== Producer ===
- The End (short, 2009)
- Eternal Joke (short, 2011)

=== Screenwriter ===
- The End (short, 2009)
- Eternal Joke (short, 2011)

== Discography ==
- Skin Graft (1996) – title track: "Underwater City"
- Impossible Operation (1996) – title track: "Shuphonke – Intro"
- Urban Break-even Point (1997) – title track: "Blanket World"
- Lunchbox Commando (1997) – title track: "Food Addiction – Hwang Shin-hye Band"
- Dog, Lucky Star (1998) – title track: "Declaration/Confession"
- 21C New Hair (2000) – title track: "Surreal Mom"
- Sympathy for Mr. Vengeance (2002) – title track: "Digging"
- A Bizarre Love Triangle (2002) – title track: "For the Bizarre Love Triangle..."
- Acacia (2003) – title track: "Work A-1"
- Tuna World (2004) – title track: "Korean Citizen"
- The Complete Best 1995–1997 (2004) – title track: "Bad Movie"
- The Box (2005) – title track: "Give Me Water"
- Crying Fist (2005) – title track: "Dream of Blue Sky"
- A Bittersweet Life (2005) – title track: "A Bittersweet Life III"
- Dasepo Naughty Girls (2006) – title track: "Birds Waltz"
- Step One (2007) – title track: "Spring"
- Time of Reflection (2008) – title track: "Lap Pillow"
- Father, Marie and I (2008) – title track: "Red River Valley"
- Give Me Water (2008) – title track: "Give Me Water"

=== Music contributions ===
- Sympathy for Mr. Vengeance (2002)
- Dasepo Naughty Girls (2006)
