= Wind Echoing in My Being =

1997 film

- US film poster
- Directed by: Jeon Soo-il
- Written by: Jeon Soo-il
- Starring: Choi Hu-gon
- Cinematography: Hwang Cheol-hyeon
- Edited by: Park Gok-ji
- Production company: Dongnyuk Film
- Release date: May 1997
- Running time: 40 minutes
- Country: South Korea
- Language: Korean

Wind Echoing in My Being (Korean: 내 안에 우는 바람; RR: Nae ane uneun baram) is a 1997 South Korean short film directed by Jeon Soo-il. It was screened in the Un Certain Regard section at the 1997 Cannes Film Festival.

== Cast ==
- Choi Hu-gon as Crazy man
- Cho Jae-hyun as Young man
- Kim Myung-gon as Tramp
- Kim Myung-jo as Young girl
- Lee Choong-in as Child
