= Boy Goes to Heaven =

- Theatrical release poster
- Hangul: 소년, 천국에 가다
- Hanja: 少年, 天國에 가다
- RR: Sonyeon, cheonguge gada
- MR: Sonyŏn, ch'ŏn'guge kada
- Directed by: Yoon Tae-yong
- Written by: Park Seong-kyeong; Park Chan-wook; Lee Moo-yeong; Choi Dong-hoon; Yoon Tae-yong
- Produced by: Cha Seung-jae; Kim Mi-hee; Kim Yeong-dae; Kim Sun-ho
- Starring: Yum Jung-ah; Park Hae-il
- Cinematography: Lee Jun-gyu
- Edited by: Kim Sang-bum; Kim Jae-bum
- Music by: Dalpalan; Jang Young-gyu
- Production companies: Sidus FNH; Christmas Entertainment
- Distributed by: Showbox; Chungeorahm
- Release date: November 11, 2005
- Running time: 114 minutes
- Country: South Korea
- Language: Korean
- Box office: US$949,293

Boy Goes to Heaven (Korean: 소년, 천국에 가다), also known as A Boy Who Went to Heaven, is a 2005 South Korean fantasy romantic comedy film directed by Yoon Tae-yong, and starring Yum Jung-ah and Park Hae-il.

== Plot ==
Ne-mo is a thirteen-year-old boy growing up in 1980s South Korea, and is the only child of a single mother who runs a watch repair shop in their small town. Having never met his father, Ne-mo resolves to marry a single mother when he is older. Following the suicide of his mother, Ne-mo becomes acquainted with Bu-ja, who opens a comic shop in his town. Bu-ja is also a single mother with a young son of her own, and Ne-mo instantly falls in love with her. Despite their age difference he proposes to her in a movie theater, but a fire breaks out and Ne-mo is killed saving Bu-ja's son.

Waking up in Heaven, Ne-mo finds himself in the middle of an argument between two angels, who can't agree whether his life was supposed to end at the age of thirteen or ninety-three. As a compromise they return him to Earth several days after he died, except he is now thirty-three years old and will age one year every day until he reaches ninety-three. Now an adult and with just sixty days left to live, Ne-mo poses as his own father and resumes his pursuit of Bu-ja.

== Cast ==
- Yum Jung-ah as Bu-ja
- Park Hae-il as Ne-mo
  - Kim Kwan-woo as young Ne-mo
- Oh Kwang-rok as Ne-mo's father
- Park Eun-soo as police
- Jeong Jin-gak
- Hong So-yeon
- Jo Min-su as Ne-mo's mother (cameo)

== Release ==
Boy Goes to Heaven opened in South Korea on 11 November 2005, and was ranked fourth at the box office on its opening weekend with 109,186 admissions. The film went on to accumulate a total of 242,053 admissions nationwide.

== Critical response ==
In a review for The Korea Herald, Yang Sung-jin praised the performance of child actor Kim Kwan-woo as "impressive and believable" and found Park Hae-il "true to form" as one of South Korea's leading actors, but criticized Yum Jung-ah for her "hackneyed" and overemphasised sexuality. Yang also regarded the relationship between the two main characters as inappropriate, noting that Bu-ja promises to marry Ne-mo when he is still a child and later has sex with him falsely believing that he is an adult, saying that while the character "is not a pedophile... she clearly—and at least initially—doesn't have motives as pure-hearted as Nae-mo's." Love HK Film.com described Boy Goes to Heaven as a "cute, fairly entertaining, but wholly inconsequential fantasy melodrama", and was critical of the director for a lack of attention to detail, in particular a reference to the age gap between the characters despite the film's 1980s setting.
