= Love And... =

Love and...
- Theatrical poster
- Directed by: Zhang Lu
- Screenplay by: Zhang Lu
- Produced by: Laila Jo
- Starring: Park Hae-il; Ahn Sung-ki; Moon So-ri; Han Ye-ri
- Cinematography: Cho Young-jik
- Edited by: Lee Hak-min
- Music by: Zhang Lu
- Production companies: Smile Ent. Lu Film
- Release dates: September 2015 (Seoul Senior Film Festival); October 22, 2015 (South Korea)
- Running time: 70 minutes
- Country: South Korea
- Language: Korean

Love and... (Korean: 필름시대사랑; RR: Pilleumsidaesarang) is a 2015 South Korean drama film written and directed by Korean-Chinese filmmaker Zhang Lu and stars Park Hae-il, Ahn Sung-ki, Moon So-ri and Han Ye-ri. Commissioned by Seoul Senior Film Festival's support program, it consists of four parts – "Love," "Film," "Them" and "Love Again" – is a story within a story. It made its premiere as the opening film of the 8th Seoul Senior Film Festival in September 2015.

== Cast ==
- Park Hae-il as 1st lighting technician
- Ahn Sung-ki as Grandfather
- Moon So-ri as Hospital janitor
- Han Ye-ri as Granddaughter
- Nam Myung-ryul as Elder
- Baek Hyun-jin as Nurse
