= The Legend (2012 film) =

2012 film by Christian Lara

The Legend is a 2012 film directed and written by Christian Lara.

== Plot ==
Benedicte, a Vietnamese child abandoned by her biological mother, was adopted by a couple who live in Geneva. She becomes a violin virtuoso and gets engaged to Steve, a young doctor.

On the wedding day, Steve abandons her at the altar, sending a cryptic text message as the only explanation: Don't wait for me.

Two years later, Benedicte learns that Steve is living in French Polynesia. She journeys to the island to finally get an explanation and, possibly, to try and win her former fiancé back, whom she thinks she's still in love with.

However, when Benedicte encounters Steve things do not unfold the way that she imagined. Upset, exhausted by the long trip, and irritated by the presence of a woman, Laurence, Benedicte attempts to find a way to leave the island.

Alas, the boat that had brought her has already left the harbor. Laurence, who has followed her to the harbor, tells Benedicte that the only way to leave the island, will be in three days by plane or in two weeks by boat.

Suddenly, a mysterious sailboat appears in the lagoon. Intrigued by the presence of this vessel, Benedicte sets about to meet the lonely sailor, David. On board she discovers a strange medallion that seems to hold a mysterious secret...

== Release ==
Released in 2012, the film was shot in French Polynesia and was inspired by the legend of the "Flying Dutchman." The film screened at the Festival Cinemator.

== Cast ==
- Barry Primus as Arnold
- Thierry Helaine as David
- Mi Kwan Lock as Benedicte Coen Schneidre
- Ray Reboul as Steve
- Paris Benjamin as Laurence
