= Fukuoka (film) =

- Film poster
- Directed by: Zhang Lü
- Written by: Zhang Lü
- Produced by: Zhang Lü; Oh Sehyeon; Kaoru Nishitani
- Starring: Kwon Hae-hyo; Yoon Je-moon; Park So-dam
- Cinematography: Park Jung-hoon
- Edited by: Lee Hak-min
- Production company: Lu Film
- Release dates: February 2020 (Berlinale); August 27, 2020 (South Korea)
- Running time: 85 minutes
- Country: South Korea
- Languages: Korean; Japanese; Mandarin

Fukuoka (Korean: 후쿠오카) is a 2020 South Korean drama film written and directed by Zhang Lü, and starring Kwon Hae-hyo, Yoon Je-moon and Park So-dam. It premiered at the 70th Berlin International Film Festival in February 2020. The film was released in South Korea on 27 August.

== Plot ==
Je-moon and Hae-hyo were good friends in college but fell out after falling in love with the same girl, Soon-yi. Now 28 years later and approaching middle age, his memory of his college days starts to haunt him frequently. One day, a strange girl, So-dam, appears and urges him to look for Hae-hyo, who lives in Japan.

== Cast ==
- Kwon Hae-hyo as Hae-hyo
- Yoon Je-moon as Je-moon
- Park So-dam as So-dam
- Yamamoto Yuki as Yuki
