= Homeland (Chinese TV series) =

- Chinese: 河山
- Hanyu Pinyin: Heshan
- Genre: Historical, military drama
- Written by: Han Fei; Fang Zhan
- Directed by: Wang Xinjun
- Starring: Wang Xinjun; Qin Hailu; Han Li; Wang Wenqi
- Country of origin: China
- Original language: Mandarin
- No. of seasons: 1
- No. of episodes: 50

Production
- Executive producer: Qin Hailu
- Production companies: Perfect World; Beijing Qimei Film and Television Studio; Hunan Television

Original release
- Network: Beijing Television
- Release: November 6, 2019

Homeland (Chinese: 河山) is a 2019 Chinese military drama television series directed by Wang Xinjun and produced by Qin Hailu. It stars Wang Xinjun, Qin Hailu, Han Li, and Wang Wenqi. The series premiered on Beijing Television on November 6, 2019. The series focuses on the life of Wei Dahe, a commander of the Counter-Japanese Guerrillas, dies bravely to defend China during the Second Sino-Japanese War.

== Cast ==
=== Main ===
- Wang Xinjun as Wei Dahe
- Qin Hailu as Jiang Yazhen
- Han Li as Gao Xiaoshan
- Wang Wenqi as Cui Gu

=== Supporting ===
- Li Xuejian as Wei Xiluo, father of Wei Dahe.
- Wei Qing as Mother
- Zhang Jiayi as Jian Xiuzhang
- Xin Baiqing as Fu Yang
- You Yong as Commander Song
- Liu Xiaoning as Commander Wei
- Shen Junyi as Jiang Huaizhu
- Wang Hui as Duan Dewu
- Zhao Liang as Fan Chengzhang
- Shi Zhaoqi as Division Commander Feng
- Sang Mingsheng as Ye Xianzhi
- Xu Leizhi as Xu Peizong
- Sun Dachuan as Li Daqiao
- Gao Xinsheng as Wang Sanxi
- Jin Tiefeng as Japanese military officer.

== Soundtrack ==
No.	Title	Lyrics	Music	Singer(s)	Length
1.	"Homeland (河山)" (Opening theme)	Liu Chang	Tan Xuan	Jin Runji
3.	"Feelings on the Grassland (原上情)" (Interlude)	Liu Chang	Tan Xuan	Mi Jing

== Production ==
Shooting began on September 9, 2018 in Yuci, Shanxi and ended on April 3, 2019.
