= Gyeongju (film) =

- Theatrical poster
- Directed by: Zhang Lu
- Written by: Zhang Lu
- Produced by: Na Gyeong-chan; Kim Dong-hyun; Zhang Lu
- Starring: Park Hae-il; Shin Min-ah
- Cinematography: Cho Young-jik
- Edited by: Kim Hyeong-ju
- Music by: Kang Min-guk
- Distributed by: Invent D (South Korea); M-Line Distribution (worldwide)
- Release date: June 12, 2014
- Running time: 149 minutes
- Countries: South Korea; China
- Language: Korean

Gyeongju (Korean: 경주) is a 2014 South Korean slice-of-life film written and directed by Zhang Lu, starring Park Hae-il and Shin Min-ah.

== Plot ==
Choi Hyeon visits Korea to pay his respects to his recently deceased friend, Kim Chang-hee. He sees his other friend Kang. Hyeon is a history professor in China, but people often mistake him for a weirdo. When people try to connect with him, he snubs them, but maintains an outwardly close relation. After paying his respects, he roams around Gyeongju, capital of the Silla Kingdom, now famous for tombs and tumuli. He visits a teahouse that he, Kim, and Kang had visited seven years earlier. Hyeon gets curious about an erotic piece of art that had been displayed there and has since vanished, and shows an interest in the current owner of the teahouse, Gong Yun-hee. They start to spend the day together. She invites him to her bed, but he is preoccupied with his thoughts and the picture. He leaves in the morning, knowing that some people whom he saw yesterday have died. He wanders more. The next morning at the teahouse, Gong Yun-hee is curious about the erotic art which she has covered with wallpaper. A flashback follows in which Hyeon and his friends seated at the teahouse table comment on the erotic painting, which displays the words "Lets have a drink and then each other". Kim Chang-hee's widow appears to have been the previous owner of the teahouse.

== Cast ==
- Park Hae-il as Choi Hyeon
- Shin Min-a as Gong Yoon-hee
- Yoon Jin-seo as Yeo-jeong
- Kim Tae-hoon as Detective Lee Young-min
- Kwak Ja-hyeong as Lee Choon-won
- Shin So-yul as Da-yeon
- Baek Hyun-jin as Professor Park
- Ryoo Seung-wan as Teacher Kang
- Lee Na-ra as Kim Chang-hee's wife
- Jeong In-seon as young receptionist
- Lee Hyeon-jeong as mother
- Kim Soo-ahn as little kid
- Kim Hak-sun as Kim Chang-hee

== Awards and nominations ==
Year	Award	Category	Recipient	Result
2014	23rd Buil Film Awards	Best Film	Gyeongju	Nominated
2014	23rd Buil Film Awards	Best Director	Zhang Lu	Nominated
2014	23rd Buil Film Awards	Best Actor	Park Hae-il	Nominated
2014	23rd Buil Film Awards	Best Supporting Actor	Baik Hyun-jhin	Nominated
2014	23rd Buil Film Awards	Best Cinematography	Cho Young-jik	Nominated
2014	34th Korean Association of Film Critics Awards	Best Director	Zhang Lu	Won
2014	34th Korean Association of Film Critics Awards	Critics' Top 10	Gyeongju	Won
2014	15th Busan Film Critics Awards	Best Film	Gyeongju	Won
2014	15th Busan Film Critics Awards	Technical Award	Cho Young-jik	Won
2015	20th Chunsa Film Art Awards	Best Director (Grand Prix)	Zhang Lu	Nominated
2015	2nd Wildflower Film Awards	Best Director (Narrative Film)	Zhang Lu	Nominated
2015	2nd Wildflower Film Awards	Best Actor	Park Hae-il	Nominated
2015	2nd Wildflower Film Awards	Best Actress	Shin Min-ah	Nominated
2015	2nd Wildflower Film Awards	Best Cinematography	Cho Young-jik	Nominated
2015	2nd Wildflower Film Awards	Special Jury Prize	Shin Min-ah	Won
2015	51st Baeksang Arts Awards	Best Director	Zhang Lu	Nominated
2015	51st Baeksang Arts Awards	Best Actress	Shin Min-ah	Nominated
