= Dooman River =

- Film poster
- Directed by: Zhang Lu
- Screenplay by: Zhang Lu
- Produced by: Guillaume de Seille; Lee Jeong-jin; Woo Hye-kyung
- Starring: Cui Jian; Yin Lan
- Cinematography: Xu Wei
- Edited by: Francois Quiquere
- Production companies: Lu Films; Arizona Films
- Release dates: August 25, 2010 (France); March 17, 2011 (South Korea)
- Running time: 93 minutes
- Countries: South Korea; France
- Languages: Korean; Mandarin

Dooman River (French: La Rivière Tumen; Korean: 두만강; Chinese: 图们江; also known as Tumen River) is a 2010 French-South Korean co-production directed by Korean-Chinese filmmaker Zhang Lu.

It received a Special Mention from the Generation 14Plus Youth Jury at the 60th Berlin International Film Festival, and won the Jury Prize at the 8th Festival Paris Cinéma, the NETPAC Award at the 15th Busan International Film Festival, Best Director (for Zhang) and Best Actress (for Yin Lan) at the 3rd International Film Festival East-West in Orenburg, and Best Film in the International Feature Competition of the 47th International Antalya Golden Orange Film Festival.

== Premise ==
In Yanbian near the Tumen River, which serves as the border between North Korea and China's Jilin Province, two teenage boys from opposite sides of the river become friends.

== Cast ==
- Cui Jian as Chang-ho
- Yin Lan as Soon-hee
- Lin Jinlong as Grandfather
- Li Jingjing
- Xin Xhuangshen
- Jin Xinyan
- Yuan Yonglan
