= The Villainess =

2017 film by Jung Byung-gil

- Theatrical release poster
- Hangul: 악녀
- Hanja: 惡女
- RR: Angnyeo
- MR: Angnyŏ
- Directed by: Jung Byung-gil
- Written by: Jung Byung-gil; Jung Byeong-sik
- Produced by: Moon Young-hwa
- Starring: Kim Ok-vin; Shin Ha-kyun; Sung Joon; Kim Seo-hyung; Jo Eun-ji
- Cinematography: Park Jung-hoon
- Edited by: Heo Sun-mi
- Music by: Koo Ja-wan
- Production company: Independent Filmmakers Group BFG
- Distributed by: Next Entertainment World
- Release dates: May 21, 2017 (Cannes); June 8, 2017 (South Korea); August 25, 2017 (United States)
- Running time: 129 minutes
- Country: South Korea
- Language: Korean
- Box office: US$8.8 million

The Villainess (Korean: 악녀; RR: Angnyeo) is a 2017 South Korean action thriller film directed by Jung Byung-gil, starring Kim Ok-vin. The film had its world premiere at the 70th Cannes Film Festival in May 2017.

According to Jung, the movie was inspired by La Femme Nikita by Luc Besson, which he had seen at the age of 10. This is the third time stars Kim Ok-vin and Shin Ha-kyun have worked together, following Thirst from 2009 and The Front Line from 2011.

== Plot ==
Sook-Hee, a 7-year-old girl, witnesses her father's death but does not get a look at the killer's face; she only hears a whistled tune. Jang-Chun, a former friend of her father's who was jealous of a stolen jewel that her father had acquired, is present during the murder and finds the hiding Sook-hee. He kidnaps her and eventually sells her to a child prostitution ring. She is about to be assaulted by a client when assassin Lee Joong-sang saves her. Joong-sang kills the client, and she kills a henchman in the door just before the latter can shoot Joong-sang. Joong-sang takes Sook-hee with him and trains her to be an assassin.

While getting older, Sook-Hee becomes more and more devoted to Joong-sang, and tells him that she is willing to let go of her revenge if he were to marry her. He hesitantly agrees. While on their honeymoon, he fakes saving gang member Choi Chun-Mo and stages his own death. Later, Sook-hee is shown a mangled corpse and told it to be Joong-sang's. She goes on a rampage, taking out the gang Choi Chun-Mo says to have been his target, so her husband's murderers.

Cops eventually surround her. Impressed, South Korea's intelligence agency selects her for recruitment as an asset. They provide her with plastic surgery, fake her death, assign her the new identity of Yeon-soo, and train her and other women in physical and social skills.

Yeon-soo soon learns that she is pregnant. The agency offers her and her child freedom if she is willing to work for them for ten years. She accepts and while in training gives birth to a daughter, Eun-hye. After exceeding her fellow trainees in combat skill, she is assigned her first assassination, in which she accidentally kills her target in front of his daughter. Yeon-soo is later given an apartment to share with Eun-hye. Unknown to Yeon-soo, Kwon-sook, the agency's chief, places agent Jung Hyun-soo in the apartment next door; he is to befriend Yeon-soo and keep tabs on her.

While on a mission with assassin Min-ju, Yeon-soo is caught stealing a phone. Min-ju is badly injured in the ensuing fight, and as punishment for her lackluster performance, Kwon-sook refuses to drive her to an emergency room, letting Min-Ju bleed out in the car. The stolen data contains documents about Choi Chun-Mo. Yeon-soo and Hyun-soo eventually decide to get married; Yeon-soo argues to Kwon-sook that this is to make sure that Eun-hye will not be alone if she were to die. During the ceremony, Kwon-sook calls Yeon-soo, giving her her next target, a man across the street from the venue. Aiming her rifle out a window, Yeon-soo recognizes her target as Joong-sang and, shocked, misses her shot.

Joong-sang eventually identifies Yeon-soo as Sook-hee. He confronts her in a restaurant, and they exchange threats. Later, Joong-sang sends Yeon-soo an audio file that reveals Hyun-soo to be an undercover agent.

Meanwhile, Hyun-soo returns to the apartment with Eun-hye and is attacked by Joong-sang's gang. Hyun-soo reveals to them that Eun-hye is Joong-sang's daughter, hoping for the killings to stop. However, Joong-sang does not care and blows up the apartment, killing Hyun-soo and Eun-hye. Furious, Yeon-soo confronts Kwon-sook, believing the agency to be responsible. Kwon-sook shows her video recordings, revealing Joong-sang's gang to be the murderers. Kwon-sook also plays a recording showing Hyun-soo asking her for permission to marry Yeon-soo "for real", revealing that he was genuinely in love.

Yeon-soo tracks down Joong-sang to a parking garage and kills many of his men. Joong-sang and some of his remaining henchmen eventually speed off in a shuttle bus. Yeon-soo chases after them, crashes the bus and, badly wounded, holds an axe over Joong-sang's head. Joong-sang then whistles the same tune Yeon-soo heard when her father was murdered. Recognizing Joong-sang as her father's murderer, Yeon-soo kills him. The police once again surround her, but she smiles and laughs.

== Cast ==
- Kim Ok-vin as Sook-hee / Chae Yeon-soo
  - Min Ye-ji as young Sook-hee
- Shin Ha-kyun as Lee Joong-sang
- Sung Joon as Jung Hyun-soo
- Kim Seo-hyung as Kwon-sook
- Jo Eun-ji as Kim Sun
- Lee Seung-joo as Choon-mo
- Son Min-ji as Min-joo
- Kim Yeon-woo as Eun-hye

=== Cameo ===
- Jung Hae-kyun as Jang Chun
- Park Chul-min as Sook-hee's father
- Kim Hye-na as training female rookie

== Release ==
The Villainess was released in South Korean cinemas on June 8, 2017.

According to the distributor Next Entertainment World the film was sold prior to the local release to 115 countries including North America, South America, France, Germany, Spain, Italy, Australia, Taiwan and the Philippines. Later it was sold to additional territories which includes Japan, China, Singapore, India increasing to a total of 136 countries worldwide.

== Reception ==
The Villainess received a four-minute standing ovation at Cannes Film Festival.

The film was also screened at the 16th New York Asian Film Festival which was held from June 30 to July 16, 2017. At the festival, the film received the Daniel E. Craft Award for Excellence in Action Cinema.

On review aggregator website Rotten Tomatoes, the film has an approval rating of 84% based on 85 reviews with an average rating of 6.84/10. The site's critical consensus reads, "The Villainess offers enough pure kinetic thrills to satisfy genre enthusiasts -- and carve out a bloody niche for itself in modern Korean action cinema." Review aggregator website Metacritic gave the film a rating of 64 out of 100, indicating "generally favorable reviews".

== Awards and nominations ==
Award	Category	Recipient	Result	Ref.
16th New York Asian Film Festival	Daniel E. Craft Award for Excellence in Action Cinema	The Villainess	Won	
21st Fantasia International Film Festival	GURU Prize for Best Action Feature Film	The Villainess	Silver	
26th Buil Film Awards	Best Actress	Kim Ok-vin	Nominated	
26th Buil Film Awards	Best Cinematography	Park Jung-hoon	Won	
1st The Seoul Awards	Best Actress	Kim Ok-vin	Nominated	
1st The Seoul Awards	Best Supporting Actress	Kim Seo-hyung	Nominated	
54th Grand Bell Awards	Best Actress	Kim Ok-vin	Nominated	
54th Grand Bell Awards	Best Lighting	Lee Hae-won	Nominated	
54th Grand Bell Awards	Best Cinematography	Park Jung-hoon	Won	
54th Grand Bell Awards	Best Editing	Heo Sun-mi	Nominated	
54th Grand Bell Awards	Technical Award	The Villainess	Won	
38th Blue Dragon Film Awards	Best Cinematography and Lighting	Park Jung-hoon & Lee Hae-won	Nominated	
38th Blue Dragon Film Awards	Best Technical Achievement - Stunts	Kwon Ki-deok	Won	
38th Blue Dragon Film Awards	Best Actress	Kim Ok-vin	Nominated	
18th Busan Film Critics Awards	Technical Award	Park Jung-hoon	Won	
18th Busan Film Critics Awards	Technical Award	Kwon Kwi-deok	Won	
54th Baeksang Arts Awards	Best Actress	Kim Ok-vin	Nominated	
23rd Chunsa Film Art Awards	Best Actress	Kim Ok-vin	Won	

== TV series ==
In July 2021, it was announced a TV series based on the film is in development with Amazon with writer Francisca Hu writing and executive producing the pilot.
