= Yanagawa (film) =

- Promotional poster
- Chinese: 漫长的告白
- Hanyu Pinyin: Màncháng de gàobái
- Directed by: Zhang Lü
- Screenplay by: Zhang Lü
- Produced by: Nai An; Cao Liuying Cao; Deng Cilin
- Starring: Ni Ni; Zhang Luyi; Xin Baiqing
- Cinematography: Park Jung-hoon
- Edited by: Sun Yixin; Liu Xinzhu
- Music by: Xiao He
- Production companies: Midnight Blur; Hishow Entertainment
- Distributed by: Hishow Entertainment; Foggy (Japan); Iha Films (Japan)
- Release dates: October 12, 2021 (PYIFF); August 12, 2022 (China)
- Running time: 113 minutes
- Country: China
- Languages: Chinese; Japanese; English

Yanagawa (Chinese: 漫长的告白, lit. A Lasting Confession) is a 2021 Chinese romantic drama film written and directed by Korean-Chinese filmmaker Zhang Lü and stars Ni Ni, Zhang Luyi and Xin Baiqing. It was screened as opening film of Pingyao International Film Festival and invited for "ICONS" section at the 26th Busan International Film Festival on October 12, 2021. It was also premiered in competition at the 25th Tallinn Black Nights Film Festival on November 17, 2021. The film won the highest award Golden Cyclo at the 28th Vesoul International Film Festival of Asian Cinema. It had been a theatrical release in China on August 12, 2022.

== Plot ==
Li Dong (Zhang Luyi) in his youth had once admired a woman named A Chuan (Ni Ni), but one day A Chuan's sudden disappearance became a knot in his heart that he could not solve for more than ten years. In order to resolve their thoughts, Li Dong and his brother Li Chun (Xin Baiqing) went to Liu Chuan, who has the same name as A Chuan, just to see her again. As they met again, the truth of many past stories surfaced, and Li Dong also knew the real reason for A Chuan's departure back then, but his deep love for A Chuan was in this affectionate confession of going to "her" hometown intensifying...

== Cast ==
- Ni Ni as A Chuan
- Zhang Luyi as Li Dong
- Xin Baiqing as Li Chun
- Sosuke Ikematsu as Daiki Nakayama
- Ryoko Nakano as Bar proprietress (an old woman in Yanagawa)
- Ninon as Nakayama's daughter
- Wang Jiajia as Li Chun's wife
- Nai An as a smoking woman
- Mao Le as a Japanese grocery store owner
- Xiao He
- Lee Jun-dong

== Awards and nominations ==
Year	Award	Category	Recipients	Result
2021	25th Tallinn Black Nights Film Festival	Grand Prix for Best Film	Yanagawa	Nominated
2022	28th Vesoul International Film Festival of Asian Cinema	Golden Cyclo	Yanagawa	Won
2022	26th Changchun Film Festival	Best Music	Xiao He	Nominated
2022	16th Chinese American Film Festival	Golden Angel Award Film	Yanagawa	Won
2022	16th Chinese American Film Festival	Best Screenplay	Zhang Lü	Won
2022	35th Golden Rooster Awards	Best Low/Medium-budget Feature	Yanagawa	Won
2022	35th Golden Rooster Awards	Best Writing	Zhang Lü	Nominated
2022	35th Golden Rooster Awards	Best Actress	Ni Ni	Nominated
2022	35th Golden Rooster Awards	Best Supporting Actor	Xin Baiqing	Won
2023	14th China Film Director's Guild Awards	Best Film	Yanagawa	Nominated
2023	14th China Film Director's Guild Awards	Special Jury Award	Yanagawa	Won
2023	14th China Film Director's Guild Awards	Best Director	Zhang Lü	Shortlisted
2023	14th China Film Director's Guild Awards	Best Screenplay	Zhang Lü	Nominated
2023	14th China Film Director's Guild Awards	Best Actress	Ni Ni	Shortlisted
2023	14th China Film Director's Guild Awards	Best Actor	Xin Baiqing	Nominated
2023	14th China Film Director's Guild Awards	Best Actor	Zhang Luyi	Shortlisted
