= The Shadowless Tower =

2023 Chinese drama film

- Film poster
- Traditional Chinese: 白塔之光
- Literal meaning: Light of the White Tower
- Directed by: Zhang Lü
- Written by: Zhang Lü
- Produced by: Xu Jiahan; Peng Jin; Zhang Jian; Huang Yue; Lu Sheng
- Starring: Xin Baiqing; Huang Yao; Tian Zhuangzhuang
- Cinematography: Piao Songri
- Edited by: Liu Xinzhu
- Music by: Xiao He
- Production companies: Lu Films; Emei Film Investment; Great Luck Films; La Fonte; KO Media
- Distributed by: Films Boutique
- Release date: 18 February 2023 (Berlinale)
- Running time: 144 minutes
- Country: China
- Language: Mandarin

The Shadowless Tower (Chinese: 白塔之光) is a 2023 Chinese drama film written and directed by Zhang Lü, and starring Xin Baiqing, Tian Zhuangzhuang and Huang Yao. The film depicts the warm story of people healing and accompanying each other, exhibiting family bond and love.

It is selected to compete for the Golden Bear at the 73rd Berlin International Film Festival, where it had its world premiere on 18 February 2023.

== Plot ==
The name of film is from a landmark of a 13th-century Buddhist temple in the Xicheng District of Beijing, the White Pagoda. The eccentric design of the temple makes it hard to see its shadow. This has given rise to the local legend that its shade can actually be found some two thousand miles away in Tibet, the temple’s spiritual home. It is used as a metaphor for a life stage of the protagonist, hence the name: The Shadowless Tower.

A middle-aged man living alone in Beijing meets a young photographer at work. He learns the whereabouts of his father, with whom he had lost contact for more than 40 years. Encouraged by the photographer, he faces his father and regains their long-lost father-son relationship.

== Cast ==
- Xin Baiqing as Gu Wentong
- Huang Yao as Ouyang Wenhui, photographer
- Tian Zhuangzhuang as Gu Yunlai
- Nanji as Nanji
- Li Qinqin as Gu Wenhui
- Wang Hongwei as Li Jun
- Wang Yiwen as Xiao Xiao

== Release ==
The Shadowless Tower had its world premiere on 18 February 2023 at the 73rd Berlin International Film Festival. It was invited at the 2023 New York Film Festival in the Main Slate, and was screened on 30 September 2023. It was also invited at the 28th Busan International Film Festival in 'Icon' section and was screened on 8 October 2023; and at the 68th Valladolid International Film Festival in 'Official Section Feature Films (2023)' on 26 October.

The Berlin- and Lyon-based international sales agent Film Boutique has sales right for the film.

== Reception ==
On the review aggregator Rotten Tomatoes website, the film has an approval rating of 88% based on 17 reviews, with an average rating of 7.4/10. On Metacritic, it has a weighted average score of 78 out of 100 based on 4 reviews, indicating "Generally Favorable Reviews".

Jessica Kiang reviewing at Berlin Film Festival, for Variety praised the cinematography and music writing, "The warmth of Piao Songri's photography is a constant, as is his facility for the offbeat framing of even the most everyday encounter, using doorways or reflections or a quickly shifting focus." Kiang added, "And the soundtrack is equally witty, composer Xiao's delicately used score has a signature flourish". Concluding Kiang wrote, "The film ambles onward, it reveals its arcs of change not in dramatic showdowns or sudden revelations, but in ellipses, in the occasional mysterious fold in chronology and, most rewardingly, in the casual, unforced repetition of certain motifs." David Rooney of The Hollywood Reporter calling the film a contemplative film of quiet rewards, stated, "Piao Songri's loose, fluid camerawork trails the protagonist, played with soulful intelligence by Xin, there’s both a haunting sense of all that he’s lost and a newfound self-knowledge that perhaps might propel him forward with greater openness." Lee Marshall for ScreenDaily wrote in review that "The film’s delicacy of touch comes through not only in the bittersweet love story at its centre, but in a wealth of seemingly marginal details."

== Accolades ==
Award	Date	Category	Recipient	Result	Ref.
Berlin International Film Festival	16–26 February 2023	Golden Bear	The Shadowless Tower	Nominated	
Golden Rooster Awards	4 November 2023	Golden Rooster Award for Best Actress	Huang Yao	Nominated	
