= Xin Baiqing =

Chinese actor

- 辛柏青
- Born: June 20, 1973 (age 53); Chaoyang District, Beijing, China
- Education: Central Academy of Drama
- Occupation: Actor
- Years active: 1995–present
- Agent: Bona Film Group
- Notable work: Legend of the Demon Cat; Four Generations under One Roof
- Spouse: Zhu Yuanyuan (m. 2004; died 2025)
- Children: 1

Xin Baiqing (Chinese: 辛柏青; pinyin: Xīn Bǎiqīng; born 20 June 1973) is a Chinese actor best known for portraying Li Bai in Legend of the Demon Cat (2017) and Guan Xiaohe in Four Generations under One Roof (2010), which garnered him a Best Performance Award at the 2012 Golden Lion Award.

== Early life and education ==
Xin was born in Chaoyang District, Beijing, on June 20, 1973. He entered the Central Academy of Drama in 1993, majoring in acting, where he graduated in 1997. At that same year, he was assigned to the National Theatre Company of China.

== Acting career ==
Xin's first screen acting credit was Going into the Light and subsequently appearing on shows such as Up and Down of a Century (1997), Red Rock (1998), In the End (1999), My Dear Country (1999), and Deadly Encounter (1999).

His first film role was uncredited appearance in the film Because of Love (2000).

In October 2005, Xin starred with Sun Li, Deng Chao and Yin Tao in Happiness As Flowers, a romantic comedy television series directed by Gao Xixi. He portrayed Jiaqing Emperor in the biographical television series Jiaqing Emperor, based on the real life of Jiaqing Emperor in the Qing dynasty.

Xin starred as Zhao Jianping, a 35-year-old designer in Beijing, reuniting him with co-star Shirley Dai, who played his wife, a 30-year-old factory staff, in the drama film Hutong Days (2007). In the following year, he was cast in the film Glittering Days, playing the husband of Wu Yue's character.

From 2007 to 2012, he starred in many television series, such as Snowwolf (2007), Qiu Haitang (2007), Chinese Band of Brothers (2008), Marry and Settle Down (2009), Happy Memories of the Ma's (2010), The Password Of Happiness (2011), and Great Declaration of Wife (2012).

In 2012, Xin had a cameo appearance in The Last Tycoon, a period drama film starring Chow Yun-fat, Sammo Hung, Francis Ng and Huang Xiaoming.

Xin had a minor role as a school leader in Coming Home (2014), which premiere at the 2014 Cannes Film Festival.

In 2017, he had a supporting role in Chen Kaige's fantasy mystery film Legend of the Demon Cat, in which he played Li Bai, the most exceptional poet in the Tang dynasty.

On television in 2018, Xin played the lead role opposite Zhang Jiayi, Li Xiaoran, Song Dandan, and Niu Li in the romantic television series Beautiful Life.

== Personal life ==
Xin married his university schoolmate Zhu Yuanyuan, who was also an actress. Their daughter was born in August 2008.

== Filmography ==
=== Film ===
Year	English title	Chinese title	Role	Ref.
2000	Because of Love	因为有爱	Zhou Yuan	
2001	Spring in a Small Town	小城之春	Zhang Zhichen	
2006	On Red Manzhouli	红色满洲里	Liu Ping'an	
2007	Hutong Days	胡同里的阳光	Zhao Jianping	
2008	Glittering Days	万家灯火	He Laosan	
2011		情归陶然亭	Gao Junyu	
2012	The Last Tycoon	大上海	Chen Zhaimei	
2014	Coming Home	归来	school leader	
2017	Legend of the Demon Cat	妖猫传	Li Bai	
2019	My People, My Country	我和我的祖国	Zhao Pengfei	
2019	The Guilty Ones	你是凶手	Captain Zhang	
2019	The Eight Hundred	八佰	Fang Xingwen	
2021	Yanagawa	漫长的告白	Li Chun	
2021	Water Boys	五个扑水的少年	old Yuan	
2023	The Shadowless Tower	白塔之光	Gu Wentong	
2023	The Volunteers: To the War	志愿军：雄兵出击	Li Moyin	

=== Television ===
Year	English title	Chinese title	Role	Ref.
1995	Going into the Light	走进阳光	Zhang Lichen	
1997	Up and Down of a Century	百年沉浮	Pei Zhuyou	
1998	Red Rock	红岩	Zheng Kechang	
1999	In the End	九九归一	Yuan Dewang	
1999	Deadly Encounter	致命邂逅	Zhang Mai	
1999	My Dear Country	我亲爱的祖国	Gao Yuancheng	
2000	Sun Yat-sen	孙中山	Hu Hanmin	
2001	Rredemption	救赎	Fang Zhou	
2002		新刀马旦	Bai Liju	
2002	Crisis of Hackers	黑客危机	Liang Zheng	
2003	Zero Distance	零距离	Luo Fang	
2003	Early Spring	早春二月	Xiao Jianqiu	
2004		反黑使命	Huang Jiangqian	
2004	Happy Planet	快乐星球	Magistrate	
2005	Jiaqing Emperor	嘉庆皇帝	Jiaqing Emperor	
2005	Marry in Chinese Fashion	中国式结婚	Ding Hao	
2005	Happiness As Flowers	幸福像花儿一样	Lin Bin	
2006	Peacock River	孔雀河	He Guangquan	
2007	Snowwolf	雪狼	Liu Dongliang	
2007	Qiu Haitang	秋海棠	Qiu Haitang	
2008	Chinese Band of Brothers	中国兄弟连	Yuan Xueyong	
2009		人活一张脸	Jia Baowen	
2009	Marry and Settle Down	成家立业	Xu Zhixiang	
2010	Happy Memories of the Ma's	老马家的幸福往事	Ma Ming	
2011	The Password Of Happiness	幸福密码	Shi Xiangnan	
2012	Great Declaration of Wife	媳妇的美好宣言	Yu Kuai	
2013	My Parents	我的父亲母亲	Chen Zhi	
2014	Follow Me Home	跟我回家	Men Jiaxiang	
2015	Family Honor	家族荣誉	Huang Piao	
2015	For a Sentence	为了一句话	Yang Baishun	
2016		养个孩子不容易	Han Chao	
2018	Beautiful Life	美好生活	Bian Zhijun	
2018	Homeland	河山	Jian Xiuzhang	

=== Drama ===
Year	English title	Chinese title	Role	Ref.
1997	My Father	俺爹我爸	Xiao Qiang	
2010	Four Generations under One Roof	四世同堂	Guan Xiaohe	
2001	Charles III	查理三世	Clarence	
2001	Cyclonus	狂飙	Tian Han	
2007	Red Rose White Rose	红玫瑰与白玫瑰	Tong Zhenbao	
2012	Green Snake	青蛇	Master Fahai	

== Awards ==
Year	Nominated work	Award	Category	Result	Ref.
2012	Four Generations under One Roof	Golden Lion Award	Best Performance Award	Won	
2018	Legend of the Demon Cat	32nd Golden Rooster Awards	Best Supporting Actor	Nominated	
2022	Yanagawa	35th Golden Rooster Awards	Best Supporting Actor	Won	
2023	The Shadowless Tower	13th Beijing International Film Festival	Best Actor	Won	
