= A Quiet Dream =

- Film poster
- Directed by: Zhang Lu
- Written by: Zhang Lu
- Produced by: Laila Jo
- Starring: Han Ye-ri; Yang Ik-june; Park Jung-bum; Yoon Jong-bin
- Cinematography: Cho Young-jik
- Edited by: Lee Hak-min
- Music by: Baek Hyun-jin; Kim Soo-chul
- Production companies: Lu Film; Prain Global; Storm Pictures Korea
- Release dates: October 6, 2016 (BIFF); October 13, 2016 (South Korea)
- Running time: 101 minutes
- Country: South Korea
- Language: Korean
- Box office: US$102,304

A Quiet Dream (Korean: 춘몽; RR: Chunmong) is a 2016 South Korean drama film written and directed by Zhang Lu and starring Han Ye-ri alongside several Korean directors playing her potential suitors, including Park Jung-bum, Yoon Jong-bin and Yang Ik-june. It made its world premiere as the opening film of the 21st Busan International Film Festival on October 6, 2016.

== Synopsis ==
A story about a young woman Ye-ri (Han Ye-ri) who runs a bar and takes care of her unconscious paralyzed father, and three men (Yang Ik-june, Park Jung-bum, Yoon Jong-bin) who frequent the bar trying without much success to win her heart. This strange trio's interactions with Ye-ri offer funny moments and barbed quips galore, as the men compete feebly for the woman's attention.

== Cast ==
- Han Ye-ri as Ye-ri
- Yang Ik-june as Ik-june, a gang member
- Park Jung-bum as Jung-bum, a North Korean defector
- Yoon Jong-bin as Jong-bin, an epileptic man
- Lee Joo-young as Joo-young
- Lee Joon-dong as Ye-ri's father
- Choi Si-hyung as Boy

=== Special appearances ===
- Shin Min-a as Min-ah
- Yoo Yeon-seok as Motorcycle man
- Kim Eui-sung as President
- Kim Tae-hoon as Tae-hoon
- Jo Dal-hwan as Thug 1
- Kang San-ae as Fortune Teller
