= A Korean in Paris =

- Film poster
- Directed by: Jeon Soo-il
- Written by: Agnès Feuvre; Jeon Soo-il
- Production companies: Dong Nyuk Film; Neon Productions
- Distributed by: Neon Productions
- Release date: October 4, 2015 (Busan)
- Countries: France; South Korea
- Language: Korean

A Korean in Paris (Korean: 파리의 한국남자) is a film directed by Jeon Soo-il.

== Plot ==
Korean newlyweds are on their honeymoon in Paris. Strolling in the Pigalle area, the young bride sees in a red dress in a store window and she enters the shop. Her husband goes to buy cigarettes while he waits for her. When the man comes back his wife has disappeared. Not speaking a word of French he desperately searches for her. A search that will turn into a free fall into a world ruled by illegality, prostitution, drugs, a universe with its own codes and punishments.

== Cast ==
- Cho Jae-hyun as Sang-ho
- Pang Ji-in as Yeon-Wha
- Mi Kwan Lock as Chang

== Release and reception ==
The film premiered at the 20th Busan International Film Festival in October 2015. The film had its North American premiere in January 2016 at the Palm Springs Film Festival.

Variety magazine described the film as "a steadily absorbing portrait of a man trawling the ugly lower depths of one of the world's most beautiful cities."
