= Sinmi =

Korean monk (fl. 14th–15th centuries)

Sinmi (Korean: 신미; Hanja: 信眉), born Kim Su-seong (Korean: 김수성; Hanja: 金守省) from the Yeongdong Kim clan, was a Seon Buddhist monk active in the early Joseon dynasty. He played a significant role in the revival of Buddhism under the patronage of Kings Sejong, Munjong, and Sejo, overseeing the translation, printing, and dissemination of Buddhist texts, many in the newly created Hangul. Sinmi was depicted in the 2019 film The King's Letters (Korean: 나랏말싸미; lit. The King's Words) as a key collaborator with King Sejong in the invention of Hangul, though historical accounts highlight his contributions to its early promotion through Buddhist publications rather than its creation.

In the Yeongdong Kim genealogy records, it was said that Sinmi was active as a scholar before his death, but there is no such record in the Annals of the Joseon Dynasty. Meanwhile, in Sejong Sillok, it was recorded that his younger brother, Kim Su-on (김수온) helped Grand Prince Suyang and Grand Prince Anpyeong in translating some of the Buddhist scriptures.
