= Desert Dream =

- Film poster
- Directed by: Zhang Lu
- Screenplay by: Zhang Lu
- Produced by: Park Jin-weon; Guillaume de Seille
- Starring: Suh Jung; Bat-Ulzii; Shin Dong-ho
- Cinematography: Kim Sung-tae
- Edited by: Kim Hyung-joo
- Production companies: G21M; Arizona Films; CNC; Korean Film Council
- Release dates: 2006 (Asian Summer Film Festival); 8 November 2007 (South Korea)
- Running time: 123 minutes
- Countries: South Korea; France; Mongolian People's Republic
- Languages: Korean; Mongolian

Desert Dream (Korean: 경계; RR: Gyeonggye), also known as Hyazgar, is a 2006 drama film written and directed by Korean-Chinese filmmaker Zhang Lu. It is a co-production between Korea, Mongolia and France. The film opened the 2006 Asian Summer Film Festival in Barcelona.

== Cast ==
- Suh Jung as Choi Soon-hee
- Bat-Ulzii as Hungai
- Shin Dong-ho as Chang-ho
- Munkhjiin as Jorick
- Enkhtuul as Oyona
- Bayasgalan as Sarnai
