= Glittering Days (film) =

- Traditional Chinese: 萬家燈火
- Simplified Chinese: 万家灯火
- Hanyu Pinyin: Wànjiā Dēnghuǒ
- Directed by: An Zhanjun
- Written by: Li Longyun; Niu Fuzhi
- Produced by: Xu Jianhai; Qian Zhongyuan
- Starring: Jin Yaqin; Liu Hua; Xin Baiqing; Liu Lin; Feng Qian; Wu Yue
- Cinematography: Li Li
- Edited by: Wang Jing
- Production companies: Beijing Forbidden City Film Co., Ltd. CCTV-6
- Distributed by: Huaxia Film Distribution Co., Ltd.
- Release date: 1 September 2009 (China)
- Running time: 103 minutes
- Country: China
- Language: Mandarin

Glittering Days (Chinese: 万家灯火) is a 2009 Chinese comedy-drama film directed by An Jianjun and starring Jin Yaqin, Liu Hua, Xin Baiqing, Feng Qian, Liu Lin, and Wu Yue. It is produced jointly by Beijing Forbidden City Film Co., Ltd. and CCTV-6. It is a remake of the 2002 drama of the same name by Li Longyun. The film tells about the housing dispute between three brothers and their mother in Beijing. The film premiered in China on September 1, 2009 to mark the 60th anniversary of the People's Republic of China.

== Cast ==
- Jin Yaqin as Mother He, a 70-years-old woman who has three sons.
- Feng Qian as He Laoda, the oldest son of Mother He, the adviser of a craft enterprise, he has a daughter named He Yue.
- Liu Hua as He Lao'er, the second son of Mother He, he loves to collect antiques.
- Xin Baiqing as He Laosan, the third son of Mother He.
- Liu Lin as Liu Yulan, a shop assistant and the wife of He Lao'er.
- Wu Yue as Zhang Meng, a literary editor and the wife of He Laosan.
- Liu Jinshan as Rou Gulu, an idler.
- Huang Haibing as Jia Ming, an artist.
- Wang Changli as Tian Zhengfu
- Wu Chao as Yang Qiulin
- Wu Xiaodan as He Yue, a white collar worker and the daughter of He Laoda.
- Gao Dongping as Mao Zi, a Taxi driver.
- Naren Hua as Ya Zhen
- An Chengtao as Xiao Wei
- Song Chunli as the district chief
- Li Tiejun as the director
- Shao Bo as the developer
- Li Jianjun as the policeman

== Soundtrack ==
No.	Title	Lyrics	Music	Singer(s)	Length
1.	"Whether or Not (是否)" (Interlude)	Jia Peng	Jia Peng	Jia Peng
2.	"The Blue Sky (蔚蓝的天空)" (Interlude)	Zhao Qiang	Jia Peng	Jia Peng

== Production ==
An Jianjun was signed to direct the film from a script by Li Longyun and Niu Fuzhi. It is based on the 2002 drama of the same name by Li Longyun.

Production started on 13 December 2008 and ended in July 2008.

== Release ==
Glittering Days was released on September 1, 2009 in China.
