= Zhang Lü =

South Korean-Chinese filmmaker

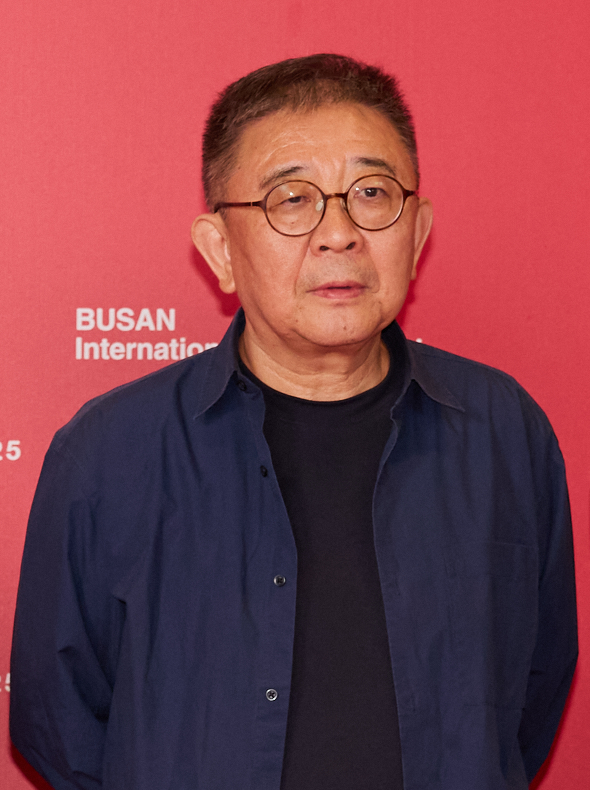
- Zhang at the 30th Busan International Film Festival in 2025
- Born: May 30, 1962 (age 64); Yanbian, Jilin, China
- Education: Yanbian University - Chinese literature
- Occupations: Film director; screenwriter; novelist
- Years active: 2001–present

Korean name
- Hangul: 장률
- Hanja: 张律
- RR: Jang Ryul
- MR: Chang Ryul

Zhang Lü or Jang Ryul (Chinese: 张律; pinyin: Zhāng Lǜ; Korean: 장률; born May 30, 1962) is a Korean Chinese filmmaker. Zhang was originally a novelist before embarking on a career in cinema. His arthouse films have mostly focused on the disenfranchised, particularly ethnic Koreans living in China; these include Grain in Ear (2006), Desert Dream (2007), Dooman River (2011), and Scenery (2013). His later works include Gyeongju (2014), A Quiet Dream (2016), Ode to the Goose (2018), Fukuoka (2019), and The Shadowless Tower (2023).

== Career ==
Zhang Lü is a third-generation ethnic Korean born in Yanbian, Jilin, China in 1962. He first became known in his native land China as a respected author of novels and short stories, such as Cicada Chirping Afternoon (1986).

Zhang was then a 38-year-old professor of Chinese Literature at Yanbian University when an argument with a film director friend led him to take a bet that "anyone can make a film." With no technical training but with the support of film industry friends such as Lee Chang-dong, he set out to direct his first short film Eleven (2001), a fourteen-minute nearly silent vignette of an eleven-year-old boy's encounter with a group of soccer players his own age set in a post-industrial wasteland. Eleven was invited to compete at the 58th Venice International Film Festival and several other international film festivals, and this unexpected success made Zhang decide to become a full-time filmmaker. He later said, "Conveying emotion through text and through images are two very different things. If I were able to convey my views fully through text, I wouldn't have to bother with making films, right? I don't like it when I smell some sort of literature-based narrative in films." [...] "I tell people that I got divorced from literature and married the cinema."

Eleven paved the way for Zhang's first feature film Tang Poetry, financed with Korean capital. Shot in 2003 during the SARS epidemic in only three interior locations to convey the feelings of loneliness and claustrophobia, it depicts the life of a middle-aged male pickpocket with a hand tremor. The film's style was influenced by the metrics of Tang dynasty poetry that prescribe verses of only seven or five characters.

Zhang then won a grant from the Pusan Promotion Plan to direct his second feature. Like Tang Poetry, Grain in Ear (2005) was filmed in China while the post-production process was done in Korea. The film is centered on a Sino-Korean single mother who makes her living by selling kimchi on the streets of a small town in Northern China. Grain in Ear gained acclaim in the international film festival circuit. It screened at the 44th International Critics' Week section of the 2005 Cannes Film Festival where it won the ACID prize. It also won the Grand Prize at the 41st Pesaro Film Festival in Italy, the New Currents Award at the 10th Busan International Film Festival, the Karibu Award at the 23rd Cinema Novo Film Festival in Belgium, Best Direction for Zhang and Best Actress for Liu Lianji at the 27th Durban International Film Festival, Special Jury Prize at the 32nd Seattle International Film Festival, the Province of Tyrol Award at the International Film Festival Innsbruck, and the Golden Cyclo Award at the 12th Vesoul International Film Festival of Asian Cinema.

For his third feature, Zhang set Desert Dream (2007) in a small, drought-threatened village on the Chinese-Mongolian border where the lives of a farmer obsessed with tree planting to stave off desertification, a woman North Korean defector and her child, and a wandering soldier cross paths (the film's original title Hyazgar means "boundary" in Mongolian). Co-produced by Korea, Mongolia and France, it was invited to compete at the 57th Berlin International Film Festival. Desert Dream won Best Picture at the 9th Osian's Cinefan Festival of Asian and Arab Cinema in New Delhi, and Zhang was nominated for Best Director at the 2nd Asian Film Awards.

Iri was filmed in the industrial city of Iksan, making it Zhang's first movie set in South Korea. It starred Uhm Tae-woong and Yoon Jin-seo as a taxi driver and his mentally challenged sister who are still struggling thirty years later with the aftermath of the Iri Station Explosion in 1977. Iri competed at the 3rd Rome Film Festival, and was released in South Korean theaters in 2008 together with its companion piece Chongqing, about a young woman who barely scrapes by as a language teacher and lives with her unemployed father in populous Chongqing.

In 2011, France's Arizona Films and South Korea-based Lu Films co-produced Dooman River, Zhang's coming-of-age film about two teenage boys, one a Chinese-born Korean and the other a North Korean defector, who live on opposite sites of the Tumen River, the border between China and North Korea where human trafficking and illegal border crossing are common. Aside from a Special Mention from the Generation 14Plus Youth Jury at the 60th Berlin International Film Festival, Dooman River won the Jury Prize at the 8th Festival Paris Cinéma, the NETPAC Award at the 15th Busan International Film Festival, and Best Film in the International Feature Competition of the 47th International Antalya Golden Orange Film Festival. Zhang also won Best Director at the 3rd International Film Festival East-West in Orenburg.

Zhang moved to South Korea in 2012, and began teaching at Yonsei University. He then wrote the first draft of the screenplay for Kim Dong-ho's directorial debut Jury, a short film about the comic intrigue and infighting within a panel of film festival jurors (Kim was the founder and former festival director of the Busan International Film Festival). Jury was the opening film of the 2012 Asiana International Short Film Festival.

In 2013, Zhang was chosen (along with Masahiro Kobayashi and Edwin) to take part in the 14th Jeonju Digital Project commissioned annually by the Jeonju International Film Festival. In line with the theme "Strangers," Zhang directed his first non-fiction work with the 30-minute documentary short Over There. He later expanded Over There into a feature-length documentary film titled Scenery, which probes the experiences and dreams of 14 migrant workers in South Korea and the spaces they inhabit. Scenery won the Critics' Prize at the 15th Black Movie International Independent Film Festival in Geneva, as well as Best Documentary at the 1st Wildflower Film Awards.

Zhang returned to narrative filmmaking with Gyeongju (2014), his most lighthearted film to date. Though tonally different from his earlier films, it continued Zhang's fascination with outsiders and his languid, introspective pacing. Zhang said he chose the quaint city of Gyeongju as the setting because "just like the curves of the tomb, life and death are inextricably intertwined." He wanted to explore "what didn't happen mixed in with what happened" in a story about a Beijing-based Korean professor searching for an erotic painting in a teahouse who forms a connection with the teahouse proprietress (played by Park Hae-il and Shin Min-a). Zhang won Best Director at the 34th Korean Association of Film Critics Awards, and received several nominations.

In 2015, he cast Ahn Sung-ki, Moon So-ri, Park Hae-il and Han Ye-ri in the 70-minute film Love and..., titled in Korean Love in the Era of Film. Divided into four segments "Love," "Film," "Them" and "Love Again," it premiered as the opening film of the 8th Seoul Senior Film Festival.

== Filmography ==
- Eleven (short film, 2001) - director
- Tang Poetry (2003) - director, screenwriter
- Grain in Ear (2005) - director, screenwriter
- Desert Dream (2007) - director, screenwriter
- Life Track (2008) - producer
- Chongqing (2008) - director, screenwriter
- Iri (2008) - director, screenwriter
- Dooman River (2011) - director, screenwriter
- Jury (short film, 2013) - screenwriter
- Over There (documentary short, 2013) - director
- Scenery (documentary, 2013) - director, screenwriter, executive producer
- Gyeongju (2014) - director, screenwriter, executive producer
- Love and... (2015) - director, screenwriter
- A Quiet Dream (2016) - director, screenwriter
- Ode to the Goose (2018) - director, screenwriter, producer
- Fukuoka (2019) - director, screenwriter
- Yanagawa (2021) - director, screenwriter
- The Shadowless Tower (2023) - director, screenwriter
- Gloaming in Luomu, 罗目的黄昏 (2025), Winner Busan Awards: Best Film at Busan
- Mothertongue (2025), in International competition at TIFF

== Awards ==
- 2005 Cannes Film Festival, The 44th International Critics' Week: Prix ACID du meilleur (Grain in Ear)
- 2005 Pusan International Film Festival: New Currents Awards (Grain in Ear)
- 2006 27th Durban International Film Festival: Best Direction (Grain in Ear)
- 2007 57th Berlin International Film Festival, Competition (Desert Dream)
- 2010 60th Berlin International Film Festival, Special Mention from the Generation 14Plus Youth Jury (Dooman River)
- 2010 3rd International Film Festival East-West: Best Director (Dooman River)
- 2014 67th Locarno Film Festival, Competition (Gyeongju)
- 2014 34th Korean Association of Film Critics Awards: Best Director (Gyeongju)
- 2019 69th Berlin International Film Festival, Forum Section (Fukuoka)
- 2022 28th Vesoul International Film Festival of Asian Cinema: Golden Cyclo (Yanagawa)
- 2023 33rd Fukuoka Arts and Culture Prize 2023|Fukuoka Prize
