= Pink (2011 film) =

2011 film by Jeon Soo-il

- Korean theatrical release poster
- Hangul: 핑크
- RR: Pingkeu
- MR: P'ingk'ŭ
- Directed by: Jeon Soo-il
- Written by: Kim Gyeong-ro; Jeon Soo-il
- Produced by: Park Joong-rae
- Starring: Seo Gap-sook; Lee Seung-yeon; Park Hyeon-woo; Kang San-eh
- Cinematography: Kim Seong-tae
- Edited by: Jeon Soo-il
- Music by: Kang San-eh
- Production companies: Dongnyeok Films; Mountain Pictures
- Distributed by: Mountain Pictures
- Release dates: October 10, 2011 (BIFF); March 15, 2012 (South Korea)
- Running time: 97 minutes
- Country: South Korea
- Language: Korean

Pink (Korean: 핑크) is a 2011 South Korean drama film directed by Jeon Soo-il.

== Cast ==
- Seo Gap-sook as Ok-ryeon
- Lee Seung-yeon as Soo-jin
- Park Hyeon-woo as Sang-kook
- Kang San-eh as a wanderer
- Lee Won-jong as Kyeong-soo, a policeman
