= Jung Byung-gil =

South Korean filmmaker (born 1980)

- Born: August 7, 1980 (age 46); South Korea
- Education: Chung-Ang University
- Occupations: Film director, screenwriter
- Years active: 2006–present

Korean name
- Hangul: 정병길
- RR: Jeong Byeonggil
- MR: Chŏng Pyŏnggil

Jung Byung-gil (Korean: 정병길; born August 7, 1980) is a South Korean film director and screenwriter. Jung was trained at the Seoul Action School. He graduated from Chung-Ang University, majoring in film, before making his directorial debut with a documentary about stuntmen, Action Boys, in 2008. Jung gained international recognition with the action thriller The Villainess, which premiered at the Cannes Film Festival in 2017.

== Filmography ==
- Three Important Components for Rock'n Roll (2006, documentary short) - director, screenwriter, executive producer, cinematographer, producer
- Action Boys (2008) - director, screenwriter, cinematographer, editor, actor
- Bandhobi (2009) - actor (passerby)
- Confession of Murder (2012) - director, screenwriter
- The Villainess (2017) - director, screenwriter, executive producer
- Carter (2022) - director, screenwriter

== Awards and nominations ==
Year	Award	Category	Nominated work	Result
2008	Director's Cut Awards	Best Independent Film Director	Action Boys	Won
2008	Jeonju International Film Festival	Audience Award	Action Boys	Won
2008	Jeonju International Film Festival	CGV Korean Independent Feature Distribution Award	Action Boys	Won
2009	Max Movie Awards	Best Independent Film	Action Boys	Won
2013	49th Baeksang Arts Awards	Best Screenplay	Confession of Murder	Won
2013	Camerimage	Best Directorial Debut	Confession of Murder	Won
2013	50th Grand Bell Awards	Best New Director	Confession of Murder	Won
