= Action Boys =

- Theatrical poster
- Hangul: 우린 액션 배우다
- Hanja: 우린 액션 俳優다
- RR: Urin aeksyeon baeuda
- MR: Urin aeksyŏn paeuda
- Directed by: Jung Byung-gil
- Written by: Jung Byung-gil; Jeong Byeong-sik; Kim Dong-gyoo
- Produced by: Lee Ji-yeon; Lee Yong-hee
- Starring: Kwon Kwi-deok; Kwak Jin-seok; Shin Seong-il; Jeon Se-jin; Kwon Moon-cheol
- Cinematography: Jung Byung-gil
- Edited by: Jung Byung-gil
- Music by: Lee Hyeon-ho
- Production company: Independent Filmmakers Group BFG
- Distributed by: KT&G Sangsangmadang
- Release date: 28 August 2008
- Running time: 110 minutes
- Country: South Korea
- Language: Korean

Action Boys (Korean: 우린 액션 배우다; RR: Urin aeksyeon baeuda) is a 2008 South Korean documentary film directed by Jung Byung-gil. The film follows a handful of students-turned-graduates of the Seoul Action School as they try to find regular work as film stuntmen, with varying success. Released in South Korea on 28 August 2008, the film made its western debut at the Vancouver International Film Festival on 29 September 2008.
