= Christian Lara (film director) =

Guadeloupean film director (1939–2023)

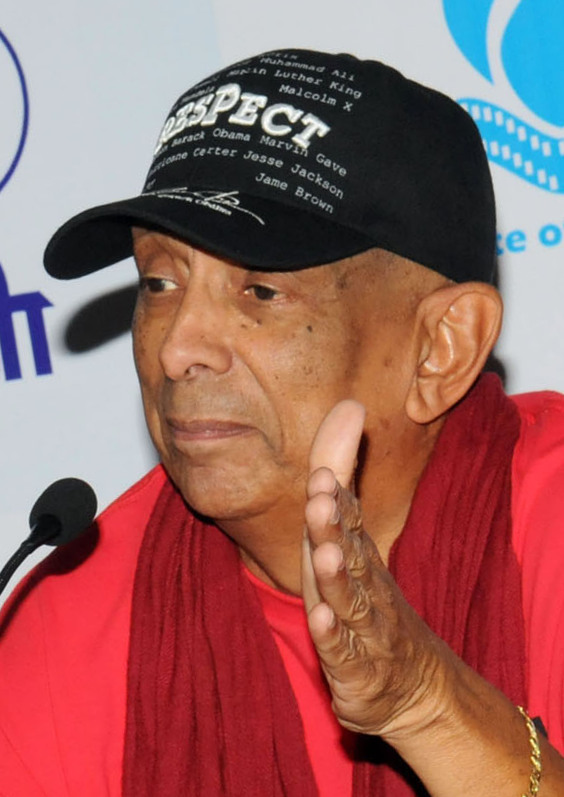
- Lara, in 2010
- Born: 25 January 1939; Pointe-à-Pitre, Guadeloupe (France)
- Died: 9 September 2023 (aged 84); Fort-de-France, Martinique (France)
- Occupations: Film director and producer, screenwriter, cinematographer
- Years active: 1973–2023

Christian Lara (25 January 1939 – 9 September 2023) was a Guadeloupean film director and producer, screenwriter and cinematographer. Having shot more than twenty feature films in the Caribbean, France, Canada, and Africa, he is regarded by many as "the Father of French Antilles cinema".

== Career ==
Lara began his professional career in Paris, France as a journalist for Le Figaro, a French daily newspaper. As of 1973, he turned filmmaker, directing his first movie, Jeu de dames (en: Dames play), starring Georges de Caunes. That same year, following a then Parisian trend for erotic films, Lara directed Les Infidèles (en: The unfaithfulls), from a screenplay written by French erotic films director Daniel Daërt (born Jacques Godaert). The two men renewed their collaboration a year after, Lara working as camera operator on Daërt's ninth porn film, Cours du soir pour monsieur seul (en: Night classes for lonely men).

Lara produced a more personal project with French actor Jacques Weber and newcomer Anne Parillaud: Un Amour de sable (en: Sandy Love), released in 1976.

Aware of the lack of visibility of his fellow Creole people on French movie screens, Lara soon engaged in creating a truly Antillean cinema. In this, he was following the advice legendary cinematographer Ingmar Bergman once gave him, at the time of a three-month stay in Sweden: "Only film what you truly know!"

For the first feature of his series of Guadeloupean films, Lara wrote a storyline set during election time in his home island, calling upon Guadeloupean actors Greg Germain (at the time the new star of Médecins de nuit, a French medical drama television series) and Robert Liensol (an experienced movie actor) to star in the film. Overcoming ambient scepticism and the many difficulties attached to its production, Coco la Fleur, candidate was released on 14 February 1979, and received acclaim both in continental France and its overseas dependencies.

Several films followed, among them Mamito, the portrayal of a grandmother caught in the social inadequacies of a former French overseas colony that became a full-fledged department of France. Released in 1980, the movie was already raising issues that would be brought up 30 years later during Guadeloupe's 2009 general strike.

Lara was deliberately striving to follow in the footsteps of his grandfather, Oruno Lara (1879–1924), who was Guadeloupe's first historian of African descent, in featuring the history of the Caribbean, as is apparent from Christian Lara's subsequent historical feature films. First, in Vivre libre ou mourir (en: Live Free or Die Hard), Oruno Lara is credited as original screenwriter. Secondly, Lara himself acknowledges his grandfather's heritage in 1998 when Sucre amer (en: Bittersweet) is released; and again in 2004, when 1802, l'Épopée guadeloupéenne premiered in France on 10 May, the very day of the National Celebration of the Abolition of Slavery. Several of his recent films, such as The Legend and Summer in Provence feature French actress Mi Kwan Lock in the leading roles.

== Death ==
Lara died on 9 September 2023, at the age of 84.

== Filmography as a director ==
=== Cinema ===
- 1973: Jeu de dames
- 1973: Les Infidèles
- 1976: Corps brûlants (as Bart Caral)
- 1977: Un amour de sable
- 1977: Déchaînements charnels (Make Love With Me)
- 1979: Coco la Fleur, candidate
- 1980: Mamito
- 1980: Chap'la
- 1980: Vivre libre ou mourir
- 1982: Une glace avec deux boules...
- 1983: Adieu foulards
- 1987: Black
- 1993: Une Sacrée chabine
- 1998: Sucre amer
- 2004: 1802, l'Épopée guadeloupéenne
- 2004: Cracking Up
- 2010: Héritage perdu
- 2011: Tout est encore possible
- 2011: Pani pwoblem
- 2012: The Legend
- 2012: Summer in Provence
- 2016: Esclave et courtisane
- 2024: L'homme au âton (released posthumously)

=== Television ===
- 2009: Le Mystère Joséphine

== Awards, nominations and distinctions ==
- 1999 – FESPACO's Paul Robeson African Diaspora best film award for Sucre Amer, (Burkina Faso).
