= I Came from Busan =

- Theatrical release poster
- Directed by: Jeon Soo-il
- Screenplay by: Jeon Soo-il
- Produced by: Seo Young-Woo
- Starring: Park Ha-sun; Kim Jung-tae; Kim Min-jae; Yoo Soon-chul
- Distributed by: Mountain Pictures
- Release dates: September 2009 (San Sebastian); 1 July 2010
- Running time: 83 minutes
- Country: South Korea
- Language: Korean

I Came from Busan (Korean: 영도다리; RR: Yeongdodari), also known as Yeongdo Bridge, is a 2009 South Korean film written and directed by Jeon Soo-il. It tells the story of teenaged In-hwa, who gives her newborn baby up for adoption but soon regrets the decision and embarks on a journey to find the child. The Yeongdo Bridge is a key symbol in the film; In-hwa collapses on the bridge before giving birth, and the site remains a prominent part of the backdrop for the story. The Yeongdo Bridge, which connects Yeongdo to Busan, is a place where families and friends separated during the Korean War would wait to reunite; it is also a place that symbolizes the pain of loss. In-hwa is also an orphan who remembers growing up at an orphanage, which plays a part in her decision to find her child. The film focuses on the lives of young and underprivileged people who live amidst a turbulent backdrop.

The film was made on a limited budget and shot mostly in Seoul, with the later scenes filmed in Chamonix, a mountainous region in eastern France.

== Plot ==
Eighteen-year-old In-hwa gives birth after collapsing on Yeongdo Bridge. Her best friend, Sang-min, persuades her to give the baby up for adoption, but In-hwa soon regrets the decision. She returns to the adoption center to ask for her baby. In-hwa is repeatedly turned away, but eventually obtains the address of her baby's adoptive parents, who live overseas. She embarks alone on a trip to France in search of her child.

== Cast ==
- Park Ha-sun as In-hwa
- Kim Jung-tae as Sang-mi
- Kim Min-jae as Woo-chan
- Yoo Soon-chul as old man

== Release and reception ==
The film was selected to participate in the 2009 San Sebastian Film Festival and was released on July 7, 2010. Variety Magazine described I Came from Busan as a despair-ridden story that is "grimly repetitive."
