= Ode to the Goose =

2018 film by Zhang Lu

- Film poster
- Hangul: 군산: 거위를 노래하다
- RR: Gunsan: geowireul noraehada
- MR: Kunsan: kŏwirŭl noraehada
- Directed by: Zhang Lü
- Written by: Zhang Lü
- Produced by: Zhang Lü; Oh Sehyeon
- Starring: Park Hae-il; Moon So-ri
- Cinematography: Cho Young-jik
- Edited by: Zhang Lü; Lee Hak-min
- Production company: Lu Film
- Release dates: October 5, 2018 (BIFF); November 8, 2018 (South Korea)
- Running time: 122 minutes
- Country: South Korea
- Languages: Korean; Mandarin; Japanese
- Box office: US$67,821

Ode to the Goose (Korean: 군산: 거위를 노래하다; RR: Gunsan: geowireul noraehada) is a 2018 South Korean drama film written, directed and produced by Zhang Lü. The film stars Park Hae-il and Moon So-ri. The film had its world premiere at the Busan International Film Festival in October 2018. It was theatrically released on November 8, 2018.

== Plot ==
Yoon-young has been secretly in love with Song-hyun, the wife of a friend. When Yoon-young finds out that Song-hyun is divorced, he decides to take her on a trip to Gunsan. There, they found accommodation at an inn where the owner lives with his autistic daughter who does not leave her room.

== Cast ==
- Park Hae-il as Yoon-young
- Moon So-ri as Song-hyun
- Jung Jin-young as Innkeeper
- Park So-dam as Innkeeper's daughter
- Jo Young-min as Lee-hyun
- Jo Kwang-min as Lee-hyun's younger brother
- Moon Sook as Lily
- Myung Gye-nam
- Jung Eun-chae
- Han Ye-ri
- Lee Mi-sook
- Yoon Je-moon

== Reception ==
Screen Daily's Wendy Ide said of Ode to the Goose: "It's a beguiling, if sometimes bewildering, enigma of a movie. Viewers will likely be intrigued by a formal playfulness and an agility of storytelling which evokes the work of Hong Sang-soo.
