= Jeon Soo-il =

South Korean filmmaker (born 1959)

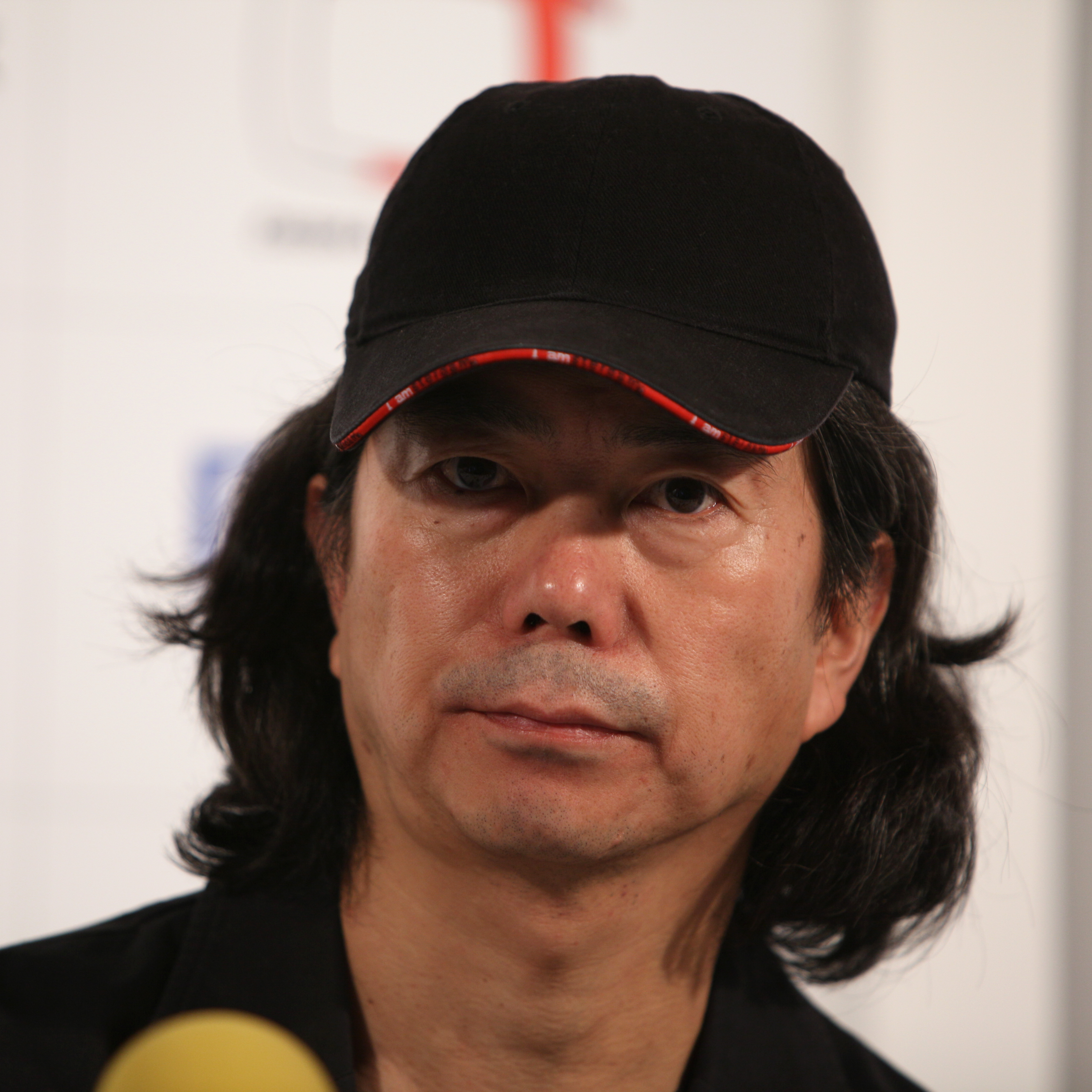
- Jeon Soo-il in Karlovy Vary (2009)
- Born: Jeon Soo-il; September 25, 1959 (age 66)
- Occupations: Film director, producer, screenwriter

Korean name
- Hangul: 전수일
- Hanja: 全秀一
- RR: Jeon Suil
- MR: Chŏn Suil

Jeon Soo-il (born September 25, 1959) is a South Korean film director, film producer and screenwriter. After graduating from the Department of Theatre & Film of Kyungsung University in Busan, he studied Film Direction at Ecole Supérieure de Réalisation Audiovisuelle (E.S.R.A) in France from 1988 to 1992. He completed his master and doctorate degrees in Film Science at the Paris Diderot University in Paris, France. He is currently an associate professor of the Department of Theatre & Film of Kyungsung University and the president of Dongnyuk Film.

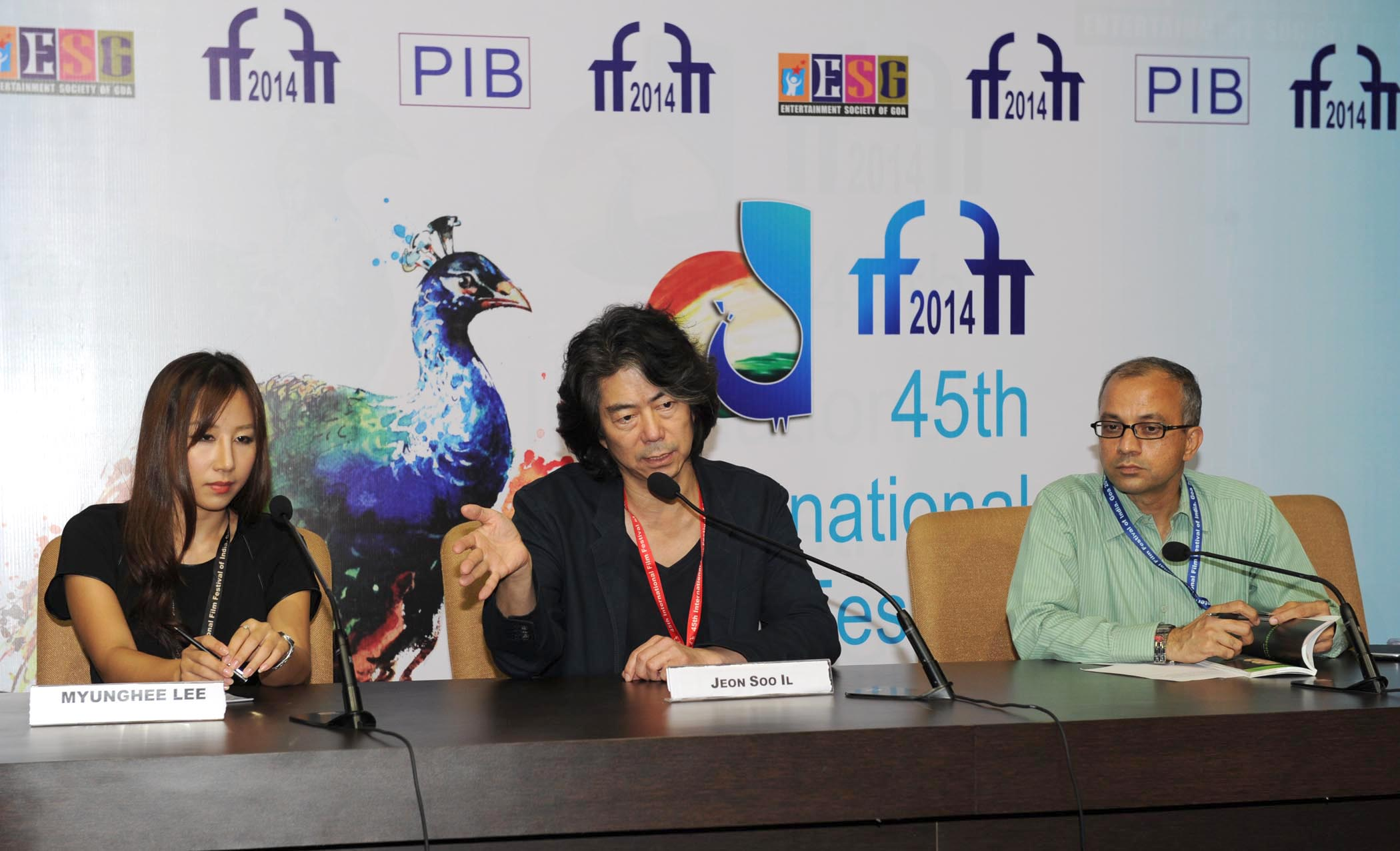
Jeon Soo-il (center) addressing a press conference at IFFI (2006)

== Filmography ==
Director

- 2015: A Korean in Paris
- 2012: El Condor Pasa
- 2011: Pink
- 2008: I Came from Busan (Yeong-do Da-ri)
- 2008: Himalaya, Where the Wind Dwells (Himalayaeui sonyowa)
- 2007: With a Girl of Black Soil (Geomen tangyi sonyeo oi)
- 2006: Time Between Dog and Wolf (Gae oi neckdae sa yiyi chigan)
- 2003: My Right to Ravage Myself (Naneun nareul pagoehal gwolliga itda)
- 1999: The Bird Who Stops in the Air (Saeneun pyegoksuneul keruinda)
- 1997: Wind Echoing in My Being

Writer

- 2008: Himalaya: The Place Wind Blows (Himalayaeui sonyowa)
- 2006: Time Between Dog and Wolf (Gae oi neckdae sa yiyi chigan)
- 2003: My Right to Ravage Myself (Naneun nareul pagoehal gwolliga itda)
- 1999: The Bird Who Stops in the Air (Saeneun pyegoksuneul keruinda)
- 1997: Wind Echoing in My Being

Producer:

- 2008: Himalaya: The Place Wind Blows (Himalayaeui sonyowa)
- 1999: The Bird Who Stops in the Air (Saeneun pyegoksuneul keruinda)

== Awards and nominations ==
- Karlovy Vary International Film Festival 2009: nominated for Crystal Globe Award for Himalaya: The Place Wind Blows
- 27th Fajr International Film Festival 2009: won Crystal Simorgh Award for Best Film (in Eastern Vista section): With a Girl of Black Soil
- Las Palmas de Gran Canaria International Film Festival 2008: won Audience Award (Soo-il Jeon) and Best Cinematography (Sung-tai Kim) for With a girl of Black Soil
- Deauville Asian Film Festival 2008: nominated for Best Film for With a girl of Black Soil
- Pusan International Film Festival 2007: won Netpac Award for With a girl of Black Soil
- Venice Film Festival 2007: won C.I.C.A.E Award and Lina Mangiacapre Award for With a girl of Black Soil
- International Film Festival of Marrakech 2007: nominated for the Golden Star Award for With a girl of Black Soil
- Fribourg International Film Festival 2000: won the Grand Prix for The Bird Who Stops in the Air
- Pusan International Film Festival 1999: won the Netpac Award for The Bird Who Stops in the Air
- Pusan International Film Festival 1996: won the Woonpa Award for Wind Echoing in My Being

== See also ==
List of Korean film directors
