= Jung Hae-kyun =

South Korean actor

- Born: August 16, 1968 (age 58); Seoul, South Korea
- Education: Seoul Institute of the Arts
- Occupation: Actor
- Years active: 2000–present
- Height: 175 cm (5 ft 9 in)

Korean name
- Hangul: 정해균
- Hanja: 鄭海均
- RR: Jeong Haegyun
- MR: Chŏng Haegyun

Jung Hae-kyun (Korean: 정해균; Hanja: 鄭海均; born August 16, 1968) is a South Korean actor. He is known for his roles in The Villainess, Along with the Gods: The Two Worlds and Confession of Murder. He has appeared in many films and television series in a supporting role

== Filmography ==
=== Films ===
Key
†	Denotes films that have not yet been released

Year	Title	Role	Ref.
2000	Terror Taxi	OK	
2004	Shin Suk-khi blues	Man next door	
2012	Confession of Murder	Jay	
2013	Montage	Detective Choi	
2014	The Divine Move	Adhari	
2016	Missing You	Detective Yoo	
2016	The Villainess	Jang-chun	
2017	Along with the Gods: The Two Worlds	God of murder hell	
2018	Along with the Gods: The Last 49 Days	God of murder hell	

=== Television series ===
Key
†	Denotes television productions that have not yet been released

Year	Title	Role	Notes	Ref.
2014	Healer	Hwang Jae-kook		
2015	Save the Family	Man at the Park	Cameo	
2015	Orange Marmalade	Jo Joon-goo		
2016	Signal	Ahn Chi-soo		
2016	The Doctors	Yoo Min-ho		
2016	Love in the Moonlight	Hong Kyung-rae		
2017	The Emperor: Owner of the Mask	Lee Sun's father		
2017	Save Me	Im Joo-ho		
2017	Two Cops	Ma Jin-kook		
2018	My Mister	Director Park Dong-un		
2018	100 Days My Prince	Hong-sim's adoptive father		
2018	The Smile Has Left Your Eyes	Detective	Cameo, episode 8	
2019	Black Dog: Being A Teacher	Moon Soo-ho		
2019	Kill It	Do Jae-hwan		
2019	Melting Me Softly	Kim Hong-seok		
2019	Psychopath Diary	Kim Myeong-guk	Guest, episode 1–2	
2021	Navillera	Shim Sung-san		
2022	Eve	Kim Jung-chul		
2025	When Life Gives You Tangerines	Oh Han-moo		
2026	Dream to You	Woo Cheol-Gyu		
2026–2027	Nine to Six †	Song Byung-je		

=== Web shows ===
Year	Title	Role	Ref.
2022	I Want to See You	Cast Member	
