= Rūdninkai Forest =

Forest in eastern Lithuania

Rūdninkai Forest Rūdninkų giria
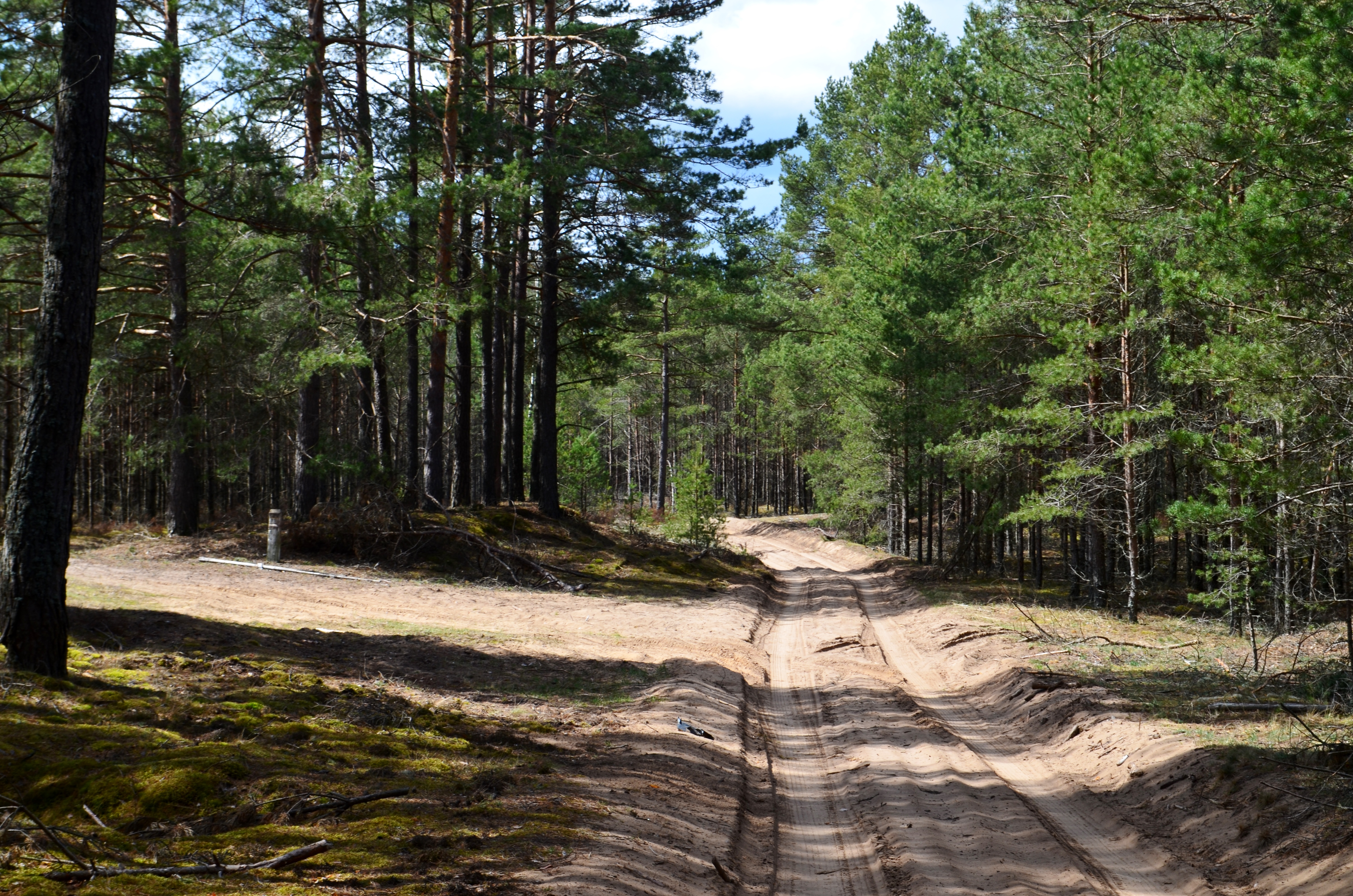
- Large uninhabited areas of Rūdninkai forest. Žygmantiškės geomorphological reserve.

- Location within Lithuania
- Interactive map of Rūdninkai Forest

Geography
- Location: Vilnius County, Lithuania
- Coordinates: 54°23′N 25°5′E
- Area: 37 500 ha

Administration
- Governing body: Lithuanian State Forest Enterprise, State Service for Protected Areas, Ministry of National Defence

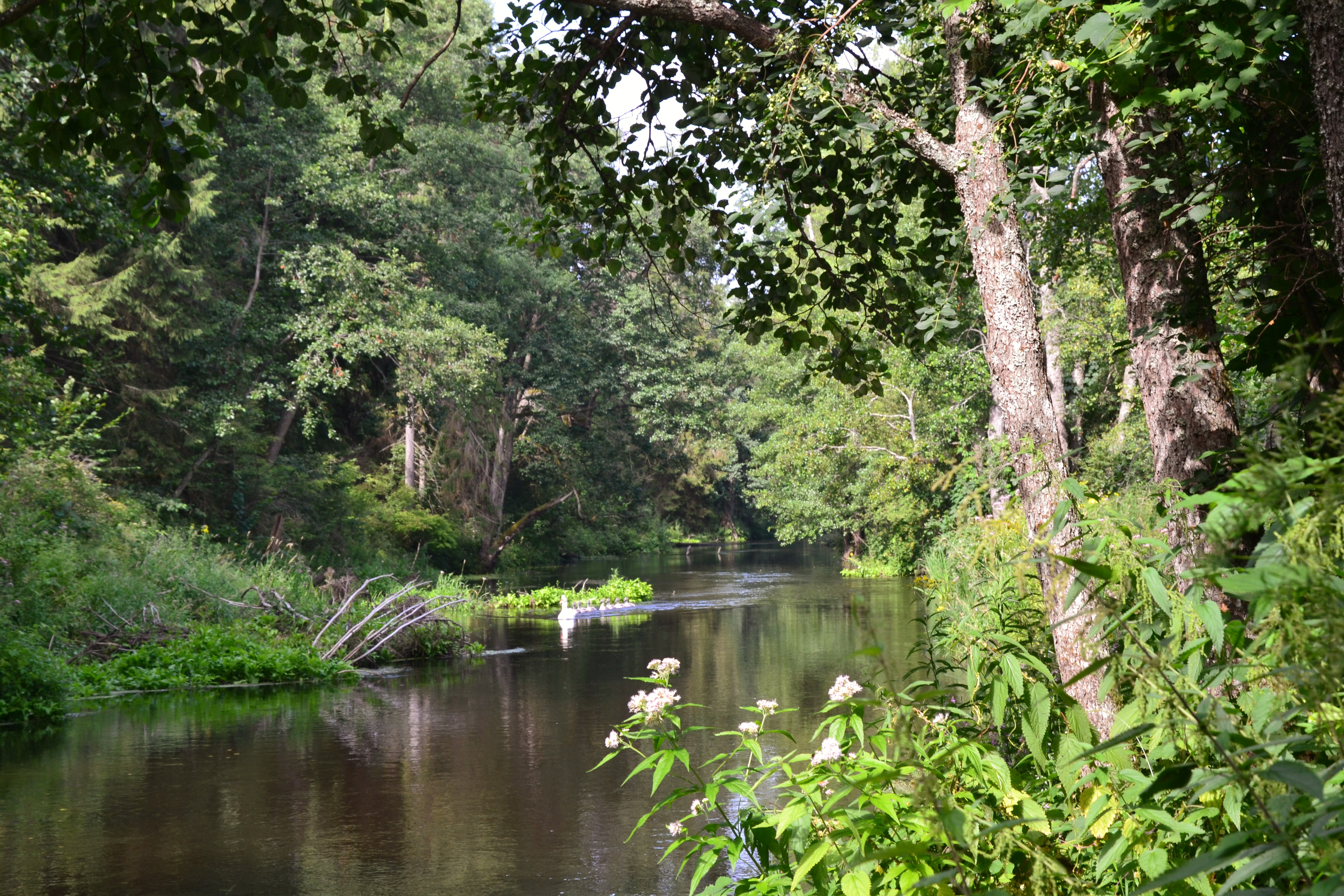
Šalčia in the Rūdninkai forest

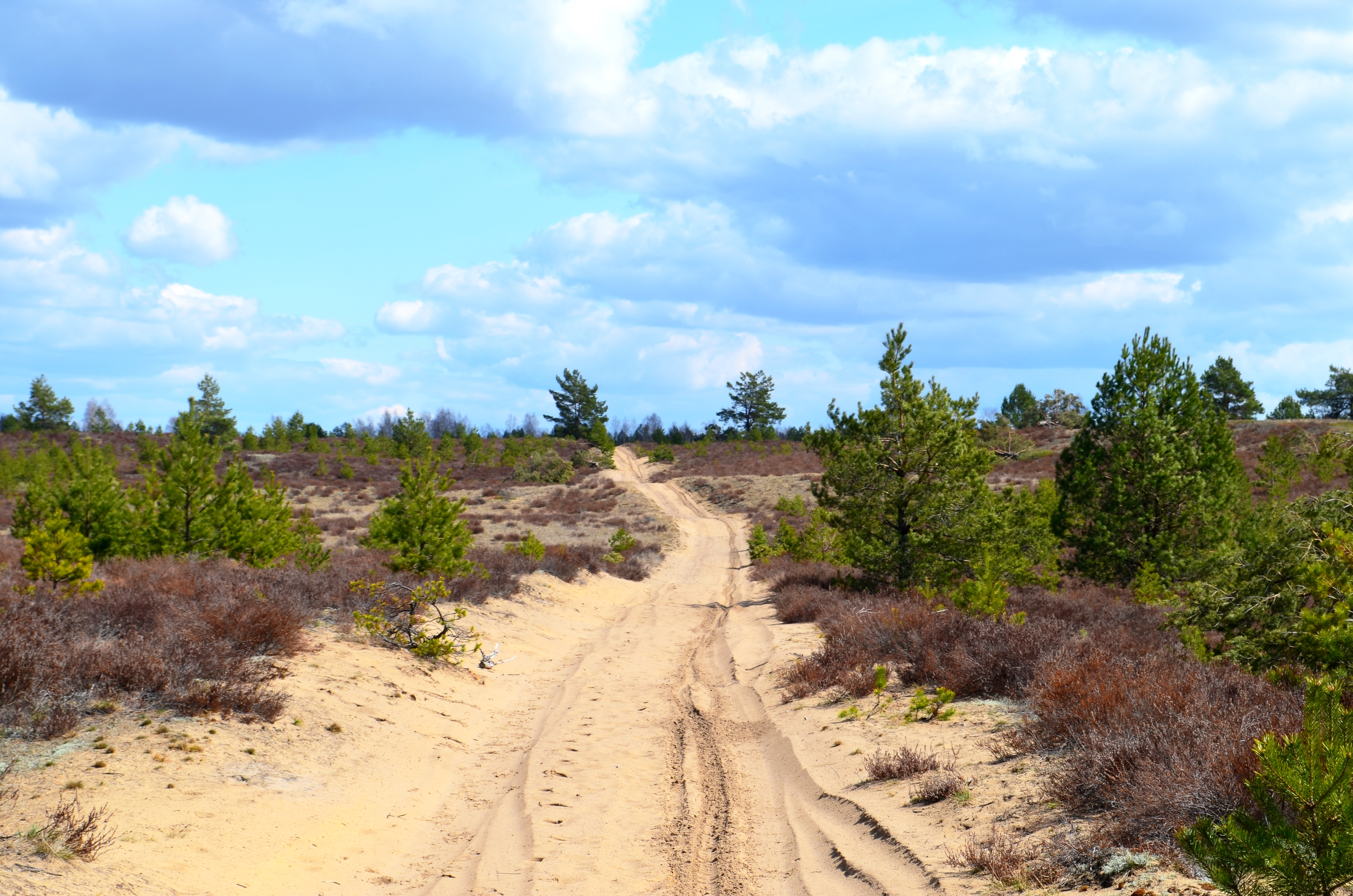
Wilderness in the Rūdninkai polygon

Rūdninkai Forest (Lithuanian: Rūdninkų giria) is the fifth-largest forest in Lithuania. This old-growth forest in southeastern Lithuania is 23 kilometres (14 mi) south of Vilnius. The forest is within the Vilnius, Šalčininkai and Varėna district municipalities.

The forest stretches over 37,500 hectares (375 km^{2}), of which 26,000 hectares (260 km^{2}) is covered with trees. The KK105 Pirčiupiai-Eišiškės road crosses the forest's western part, while the KK176 Pirčiupiai-Jašiūnai road goes through the northern part. In the forest's north is the town of Baltoji Vokė and roughly 7 kilometres (4.3 mi) to the southeast is Šalčininkai.

== Geography ==
The Rūdninkai forest consists of 23 smaller forests, of which the biggest are the following: Dargužiai, Jašiūnai, Giria, Nevainionys, Pirčiupiai, Rakliškės, Rūdninkai, Mažosios Sėlos and Didžiosios Sėlos, Valkininkai, Žygmantiškės and more. Two-thirds of the forest is considered to be of state importance, of which a part belongs to the Ministry of National Defence, while the rest is privately owned.

The forest stretches 26 kilometres (16 mi) from east to west. In the south, the Šalčia river separates the Rūdninkai forest from the Šalčia–Tetėnai forests. The Merkys (and its small tributaries Raudonėlė, Špigulė, Didysis Pirčiupis, Mažasis Pirčiupis, Upėsė) flows along the forest's northern and western edge, and in the southern part the Šalčia (tributary of the Merkys) and its tributary Visinčia (its tributaries Kernavė, Didelis Cudykas).

The forest stretches along the southern part of the sandy southeast plain, which consists of Merkys old valley. In the west and northwest, it reaches the eastern edge of the Merkys middle stream - the Vokė outwash plain, which gradually transitions to the Merkys terraced plain towards the east. In the vicinity of Pirčiupiai and Rūdninkai, the terraced plain is about 135 metres (443 ft) in absolute height and very wet. There are large marshes, those of Maceliai, Raudonelė, Rūdninkai, Šakos, Žygmantiškės; the tributaries of the Merkys begin in them.

A stretch of inland dunes stretches from the northeast to the southwest in the middle of the Rūdninkai forest. On the eastern edge of the dune in large thermokarst hummocks which have the marshes of Kernavas, Skersbalė, Gulbinai, Visinčia-Samanynė and the lakes of Kernavas and Šulnis. The dune has an absolute height of 150 metres (490 ft)−160 metres (520 ft) in some places, with the highest point being the Kuliamas mountain with 161.5 metres (530 ft). Groundwater is located shallow; it is rich in iron.

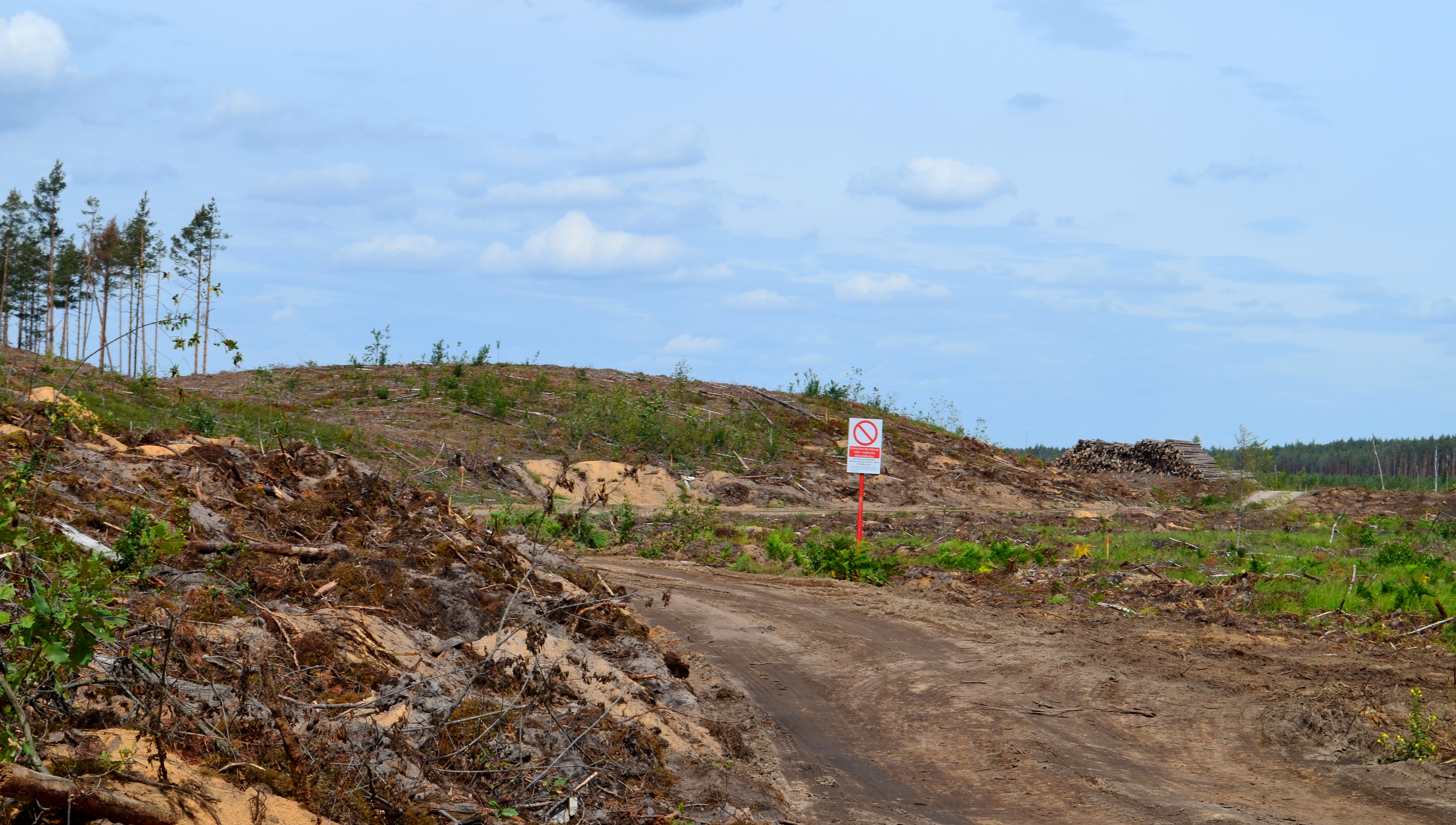
Woodland areas deforested in 2023 to set up a military training ground

Rūdninkai Training Area operates in the northern part of the forest, where open sands and heaths predominate.

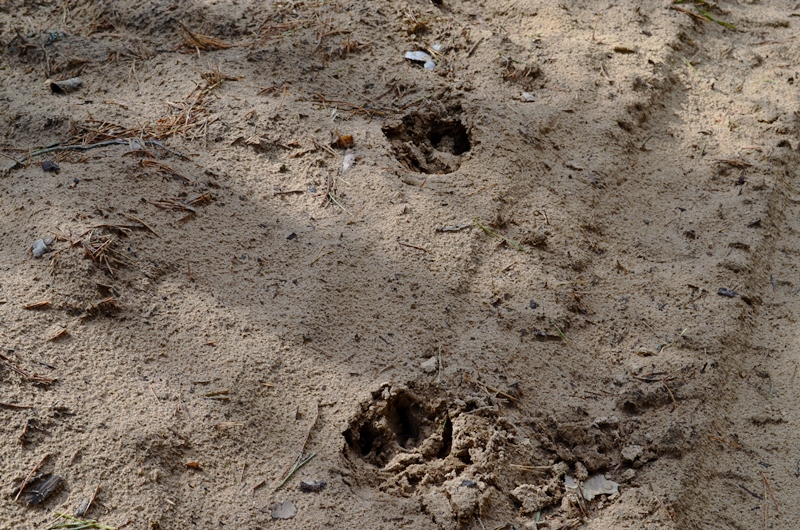
Wolf tracks on the forest path

== Tree type ==
Forest vegetation is barren or fertile, usually normally moist, but sometimes temporarily soaked. Part of the swamps and wet stands have been drained.

Type of tree	Lithuanian name	Percentage of the forest
pine forests	Pušynas	62%
birch	Beržynas	15%
fir	Eglynas	14%
alfalfa	Alder carr	8%
tremors	Drebulynas	1%

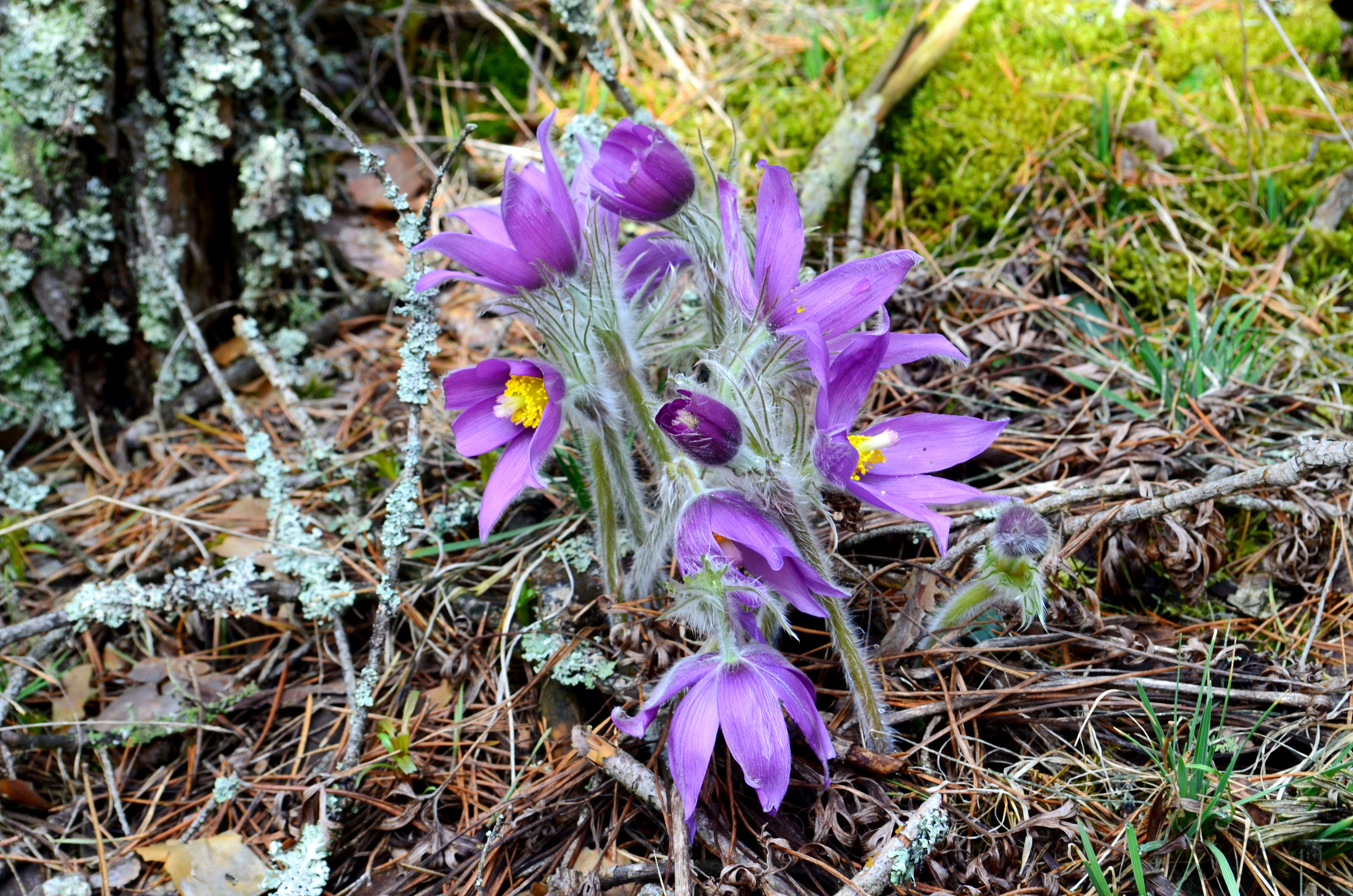
Pulsatilla patens in the forest

Young trees make up 30% of the woods, middle-aged trees 45%, maturing trees 13%, mature trees 12%. The average age of the stands is 54 years, rating II.2, fineness 0.75, volume 207 m³/ha, annual growth 6 m³/ha.

== Animals ==
Moose, wild boars, roe deer, wolves, red foxes, lynxes, common raccoon dogs, European hares, red squirrels, European pine martens, European badgers, beavers, otters, and muskrats live in the forest. There is a variety of birds (black grouse, western capercaillies, hazel grouse, Eurasian woodcocks, waterfowl and birds of prey). Rare birds are protected: grouse, western capercaillies, European honey buzzards, boreal owls, European nightjars, woodlarks, Eurasian three-toed woodpeckers, tawny pipit.

== History ==
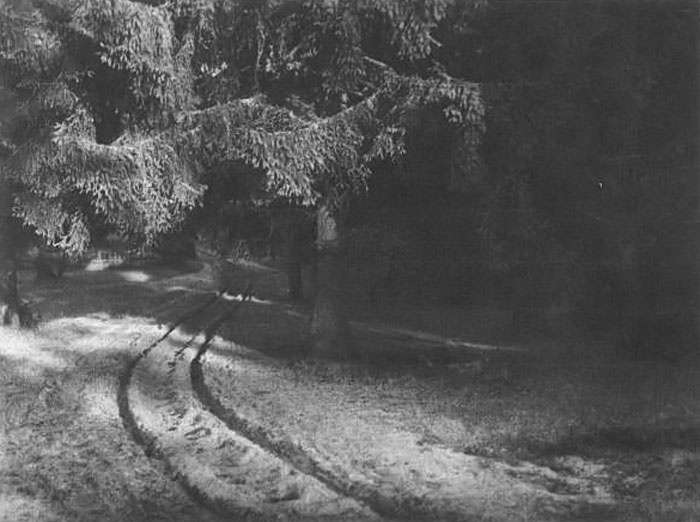
The forest in the winter of 1910

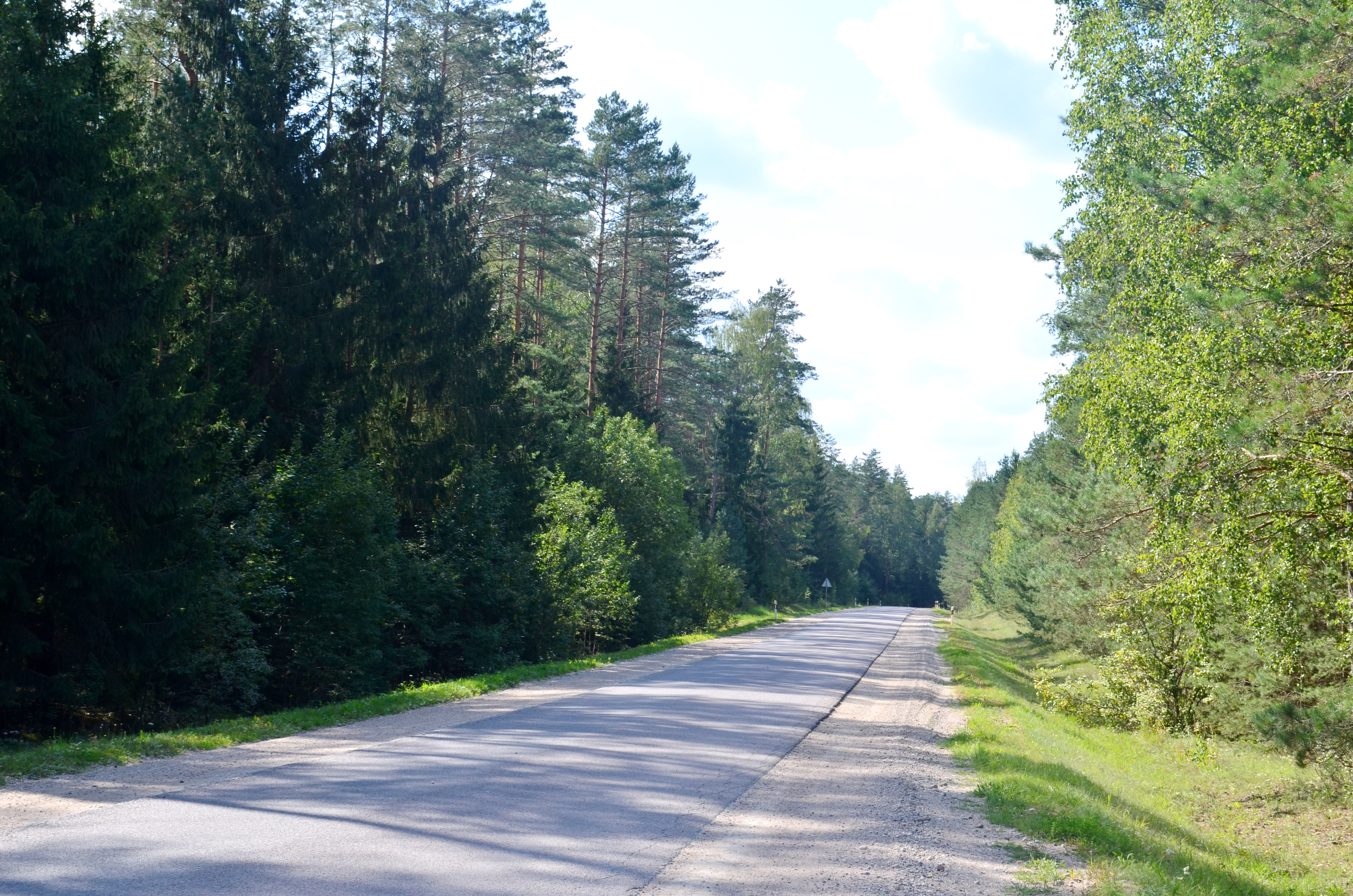
Jašiūnai-Pirčiupiai road through Rūdninkai forest

=== In the Grand Duchy of Lithuania ===
In the 15th century, the Rūdninkai forest was part of a huge forest massif that extended south from Vilnius and covered almost all southeastern Lithuania.

There were small deposits of iron ore in the forest, which have been used since ancient times. The place names Rudnia, Rūdninkai, Geluža show the former iron foundries.

European bison, aurochs, and bears bred in the forest. In 1470, Casimir IV Jagiellon founded a hunting estate and a menagerie in the forest. The hunting lodges and menageries of the Lithuanian grand dukes existed until the 17th century, when they were destroyed during the Deluge.

=== In the Russian Empire ===
In 1795, as a result of the Third Partition of Poland–Lithuania, the greater part of the forest went to the treasury of the Russian Empire. In the 18th–19th centuries, many forests were distributed to private owners. Forests were intensively cut down, hunting fauna was destroyed. The last bear in Lithuania was shot in this forest in 1885

==== Uprising of 1831 ====
During the uprising of 1831, the Vilnius University's Students' Legion was formed.

==== Uprising of 1863 ====
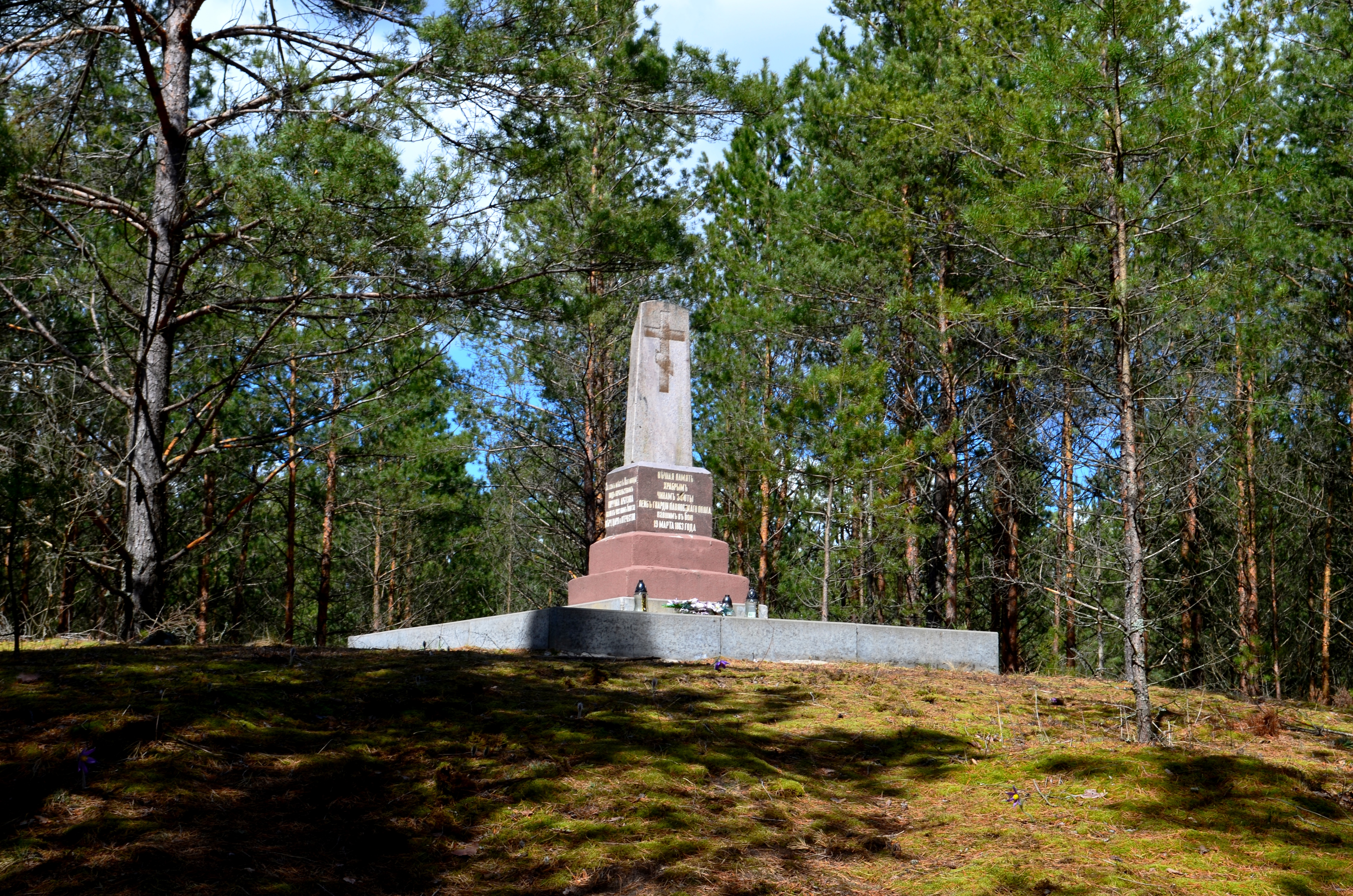
Monument to the Imperial Russian army Lieutenant Arbuzov

Several engagements of the uprising of 1863 happened in the Rūdninkai forest. More than one monument was built in the forest to commemorate this event. One of them was built in 1975 on the northern outskirts of Rūdninkai village, on the right bank of Merkys, near the cemetery.

Also, at the place of a battle between the insurgents and the Imperial Russian army, a monument to the Tsarist army's lieutenant Arbuzov was built, while a monument to the rebels was built nearby later.

There is also a wooden cross for the fallen rebels in the Senieji Maceliai cemetery. Here, 22 rebels were killed while fighting with the enemy. The villagers buried them and built a tall oak cross.

=== 20th century ===
==== Interwar ====
During the interwar, the forest belonged to the Second Polish Republic. Ignacy Mościcki, the president of Poland from 1926 to 1939, used to come here to hunt. Forester Włodzimierz Korsak, who worked in the old Rūdninkai Forestry, wrote the book "Rūdninkai Forest".

==== World War II ====
During the war, the Germans burned several villages in the forest. On 3 June 1944, German soldiers, in revenge for the killing of several of their comrades by Soviet partisans, burned the village of Pirčiupiai together with 119 inhabitants. On 9 April 1944, they surrounded the village of Gumbas, 12 people were shot dead by a sniper near the former Beiteranas estate, another 18 people were killed in farmer Godlevskis' barn. At the same time, the village's inhabitants and the people who fled from Belarus that stayed in the estate were killed. The Germans also burned the villages of Kernavė and Gudeliai, which were in the forest.

===== Soviet partisans =====
During World War II, Soviet partisans were active in the forest, who established a base in the Rūdninkai forest. During the postwar Soviet occupation, this base was turned into a museum after the war (a branch of the LSSR Revolution Museum).

===== Polish partisans =====
Polish Home Army (AK) units also existed in the Rūdninkai Forest. A cross was erected for the fallen AK insurgents, the inscription of which indicates the burial location of 25 Home Army members, who died in an unequal struggle against the NKVD on 1945 January 6–7.

===== Lithuanian partisans =====
Since 1944, the Lithuanian partisans of the Dainava military district's Kazimieraitis territorial unit were active in Rūdninkai forest. In this forest, there was no large-scale organized resistance like elsewhere in Lithuania, both due to the forest's geographical location and the local population's attitudes.

=== During the Soviet occupation ===
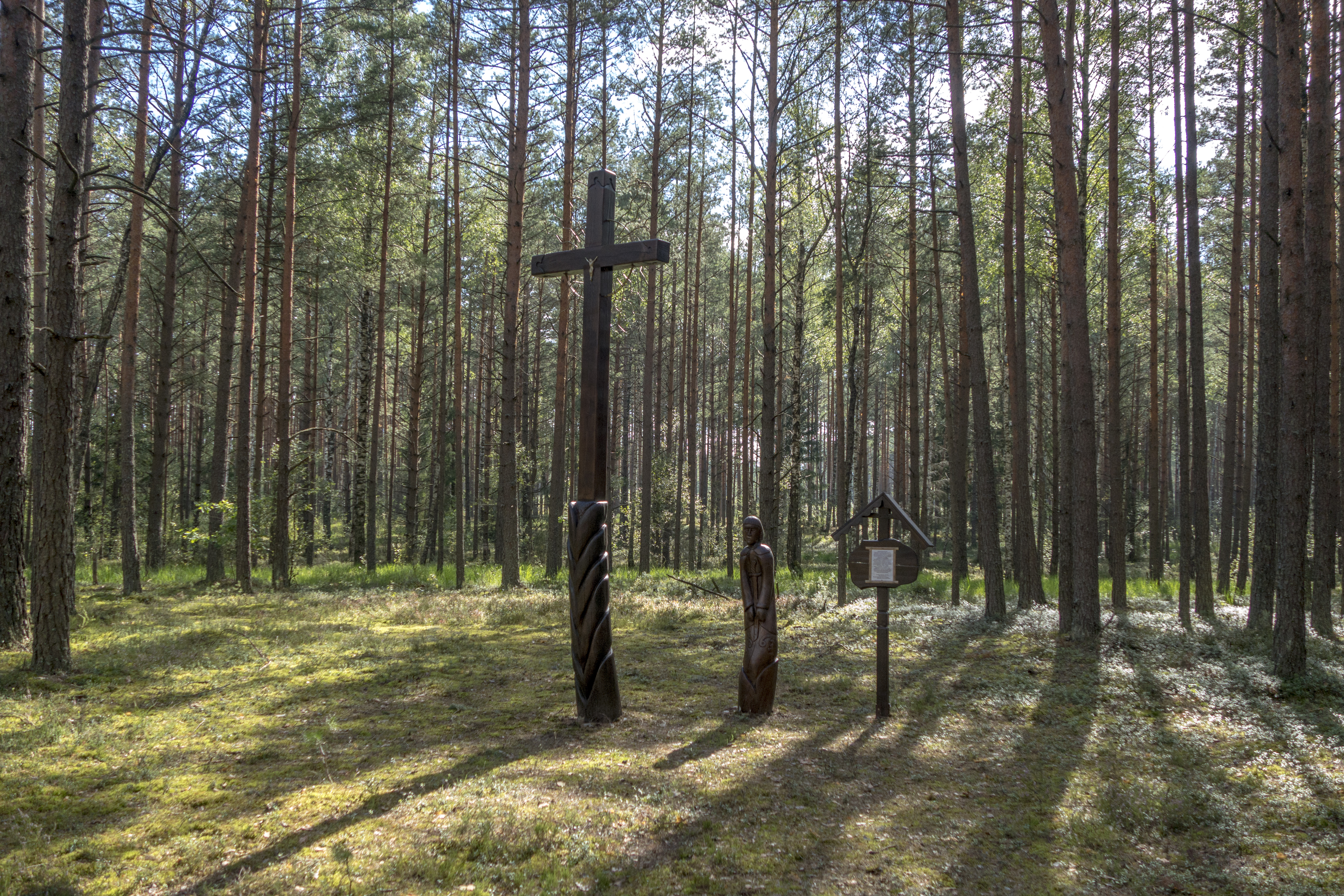
Bažnyčios Hill

During the Soviet occupation of Lithuania, a military training area was set up in the Rūdninkai forest, where bombing exercises took place, leaving holes and sand dunes full of explosives. Unexploded charges are still found in the forest.

=== After restoration of independence ===
After the restoration of Lithuanian independence, a battalion of the Lithuanian Land Forces was stationed in Rūdninkai forest. Later, the training center of the Public Security Service was located here.

In 2022, the Rūdninkai Training Area facility was reopened for active use by the Lithuanian Armed Forces.

== Space ==
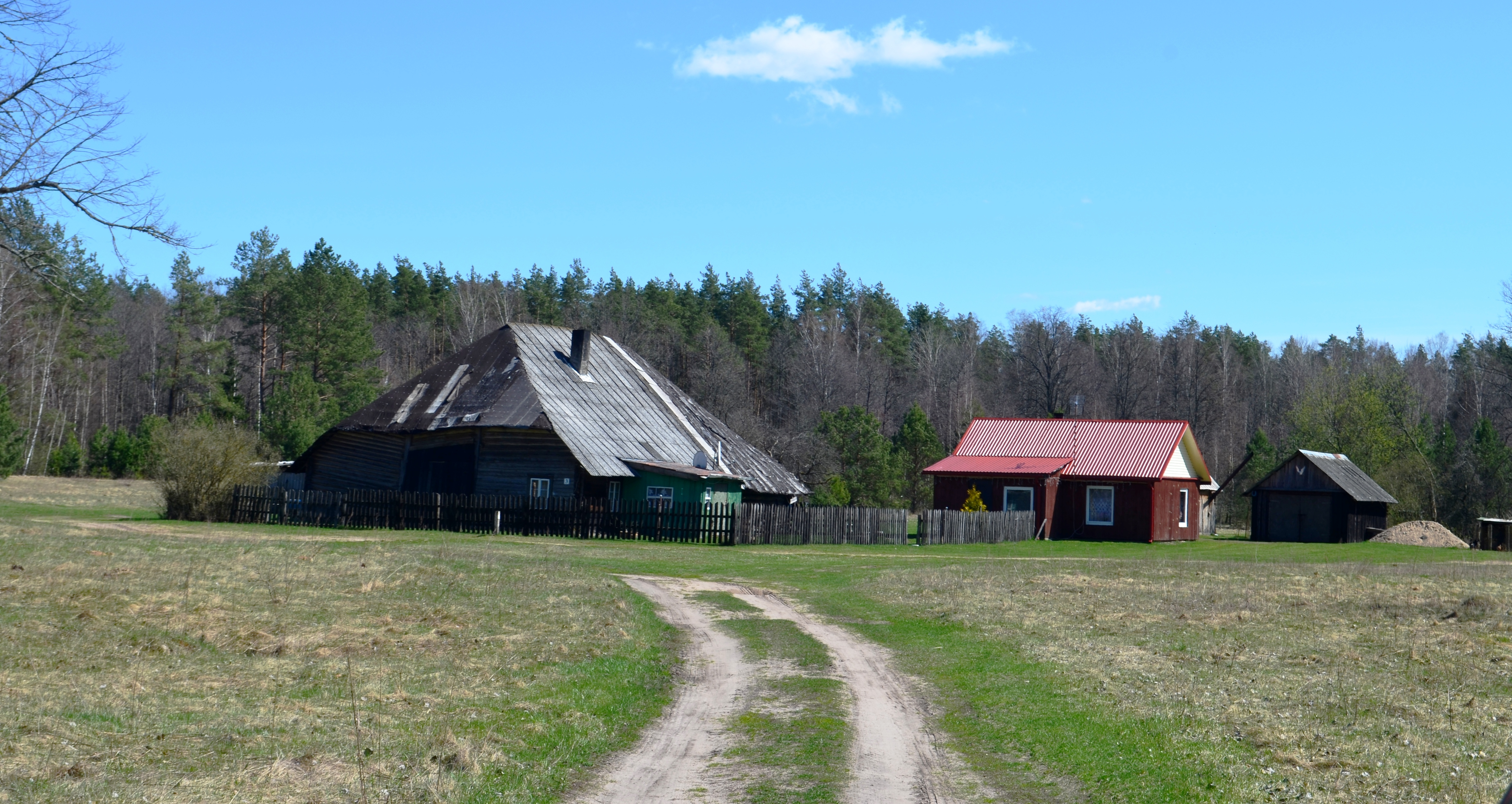
Visinčia village, deep in the Rūdninkų forest

In block 98 of the Rūdninkai forest, there is a burial mound of Senieji Maceliai, in block 21, there are the graves of the rebels of the uprising of 1863. In block 68, there is the Šilėnai forest - the Jundiliškės burial mound, as well as the Žygmantiškės burial mound, Bažnyčios hill, Kuršiai stones with footprints, memorials of the burnt villages of Pirčiupiai and Gumbas.

A large part of the forest has been declared a protected area: Rūdninkai Biosphere Reserve, Rūdninkai Landscape Reserve, Zygmantiškės Geomorphological Reserve, Kernavas Thermological Reserve, Šalčia Hydrographic Reserve, Visinčia Hydrographic Reserve, Visinčia Landscape Reserve. Areas important for the protection of natural habitats are distinguished: Rūdninkai heaths, Visinčia river valley near Gudelai, Kernavas marsh, Šalčia and Visinčia river valleys.

Roads KK105 Pirčiupiai–Eišiškės, KK176 Pirčiupiai–Jašiūnai, A4 Vilnius–Varėna–Grodno, Vilnius–Lida railway pass along the forest's outskirts. The entire central part of the forest is uninhabited. Baltoji Vokė, Rūdninkai, Senieji Maceliai, Ilgalaukis, Rudnia are located in the northern part, Dainava, Kidarai, Gudeliai, Skerdimai, Didžiosios Sėlos, Gumbas in the east, Pirčiupiai, Maceliai, Žygmantiškės, Užuperkasis, Dargužiai, Valkininkai in the south, the small village of Visinčia, Ūta, Kalitonys.

== Sources ==
- Brukas, Algirdas; Žygelis, Dalius (2018). "Rūdninkų giria". Visuotinė lietuvių enciklopedija (in Lithuanian).
- turizmas.lt (2024). "Rūdninkų giria". Lietuvos turizmas (in Lithuanian).
- Prašmantaitė, Aldona (2013). "Rūdninkų girios epizodas 1863 metų sukilime". Lietuvos Meno Kūrėjų Asociacija (in Lithuanian).
- kariuomene.lt (2022). "Atidarytas Rūdninkų karinis poligonas". Lietuvos kariuomenė (in Lithuanian).
