= Irina Miroshnichenko =

Soviet and Russian actress (1942–2023)

- Иpина Миpoшничeнкo
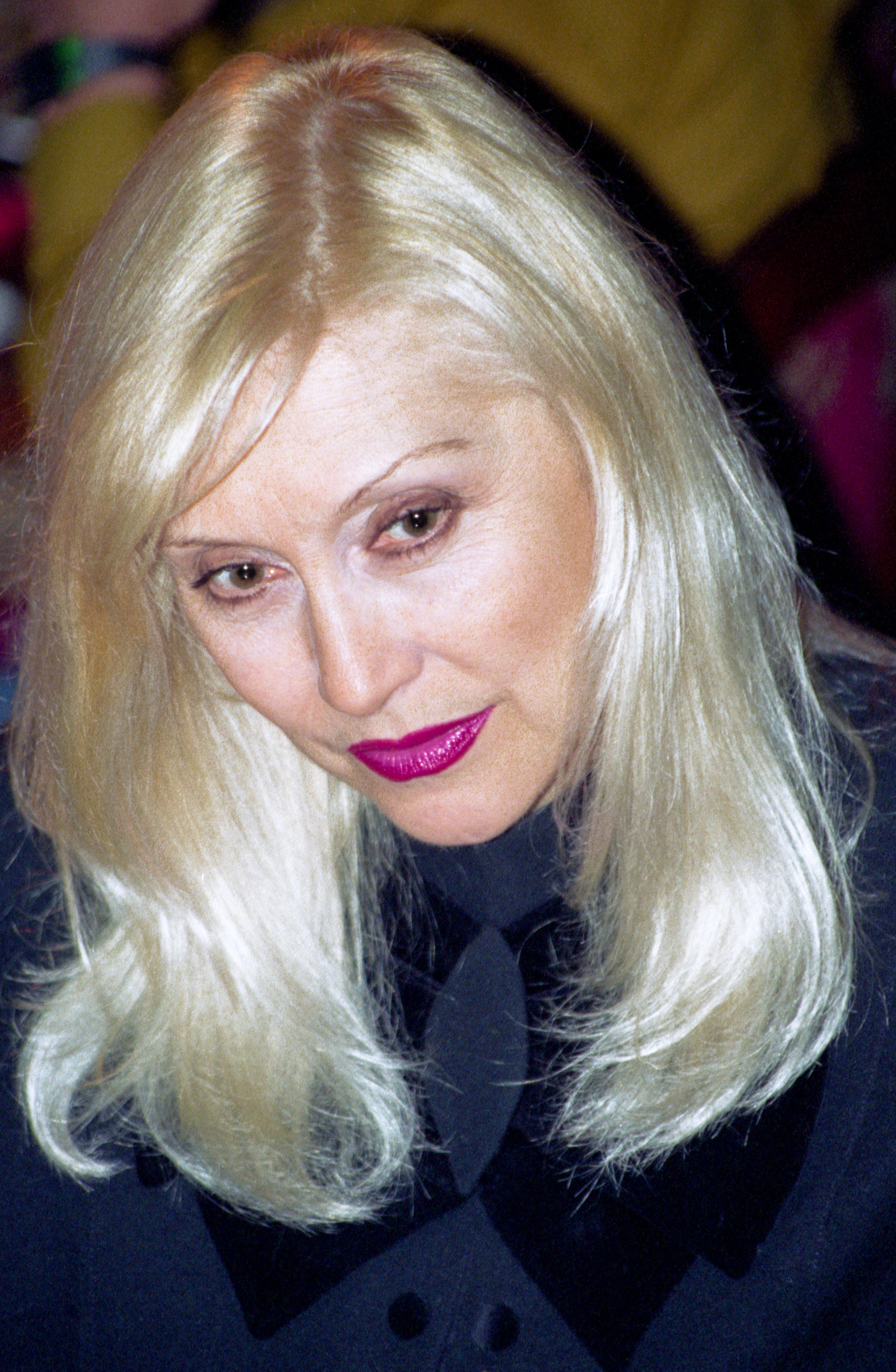
- Miroshnichenko in 1997
- Born: Irina Petrovna Miroshnichenko; 24 July 1942; Barnaul, Russian SFSR, USSR
- Died: 3 August 2023 (aged 81); Moscow, Russia
- Education: Moscow Art Theatre
- Occupations: actress singer
- Years active: 1959–2023
- Spouses: Mikhail Shatrov (m. 1960; div. 1972) Vytautas Žalakevičius (m. 1972; div. 1972) Igor Vasiliev (m. 1975; div. 1980)
- Parents: Pyotr Weinstein (father); Yekaterina Miroshnichenko (mother)

Irina Petrovna Miroshnichenko (Russian: Иpина Пeтpoвна Миpoшничeнкo; 24 July 1942 – 3 August 2023) was a Soviet and Russian film and theatre actress, People's Artist of the RSFSR (1988).

In 1961 she entered the Moscow Art Theater School (course of Vasily Markov). In her third year, she made her film debut in Georgy Danelia's film Walking the Streets of Moscow.

Miroshnichenko died on 3 August 2023, at the age of 81.

== Selected filmography ==
- 1964 Walking the Streets of Moscow as Katya
- 1966 Andrei Rublev as Mary Magdalene
- 1966 Royal Regatta as Violetta
- 1967 Nikolay Bauman as Nadezhda Bauman
- 1968 The Secret Agent's Blunder as Rita
- 1970 Uncle Vanya as Yelena Serebryakova
- 1970 Mission in Kabul as Marina Arkadyevna Luzhina
- 1971 A Soldier Came Back from the Front as Vera Kurkina
- 1973 That Sweet Word: Liberty! as Maria
- 1976 Trust as Maria Andreyeva
- 1976 ...And Other Officials as Inna
- 1981 Could One Imagine? as Lyudmila Sergeevna
- 1981 The Old New Year as Klava Poluorlova
- 1983 Plead Guilty as Viktoria Pavlovna
- 1990 Winter Cherry 2 as Julia
