= Lithuanian Film Studios =

Lithuanian film studio

Lithuanian Film Studio
- Type: Corporation
- Industry: Motion pictures Animated films
- Founded: 1940
- Fate: Dormant
- Headquarters: Vilnius, Lithuania
- Products: Motion pictures Television programs

Lithuanian Film Studio (Lithuanian: Lietuvos kino studija) is a Lithuanian film production company based in Vilnius and founded in 1940 on the basis of the earlier private film companies. In 1948, the Vilnius Documentary Film Studio was founded. It was one of the oldest film studios in Lithuania.

In 1970–80, the company produced 15-20 films a year, providing work for 1,000 employees.

Currently, there are no major filmings. The studio earns by leasing its facilities, offering expert services, and licensing films to distribution in Vilnius.

== History ==
In 1940 a studio was founded in Soviet-occupied Lithuania. The Soviet regime from then on was responsible for the production of newsreels. This studio produced a first feature film in 1953, Aušra prie Nemuno, but still in co-production with Lenfilm. In 1956 it was renamed Lietuvos kino studija and from then on served as the headquarters for the state film industry. The studio produced its first independent feature film Žydrasis horizontas in 1957. It was a children's film directed by Vytautas Mikalauskas.

== Notable films ==
Year	English title	Original title	Director
1964	The Girl and the Echo	Paskutinė atostogų diena	Arūnas Žebriūnas
1966	Nobody Wanted to Die	Niekas nenorėjo mirti	Vytautas Žalakevičius
1966	The Little Prince	Mažasis princas	Arūnas Žebriūnas
1968	Feelings	Jausmai	Algirdas Dausa and Almantas Grikevičius
1969	The Beautiful Girl	Gražuolė	Arūnas Žebriūnas
1972	Northern Crusades	Herkus Mantas	Marijonas Giedrys
1972	That Sweet Word: Liberty!	Tas saldus žodis – laisvė	Vytautas Žalakevičius
1977	Walnut Bread	Riešutų duona	Arūnas Žebriūnas
1981	Faktas	Fakt	Almantas Grikevicius
1984	My Little Wife	Mano mažytė žmona	Raimundas Banionis

== See also ==
- List of Lithuanian films
- Riga Film Studio
- Tallinnfilm
