= Mission in Kabul =

- Russian: Миссия в Кабуле
- Directed by: Leonid Kvinikhidze
- Written by: Pavel Finn; Vladimir Vaynshtok
- Starring: Oleg Zhakov; Irina Miroshnichenko; Gleb Strizhenov; Emmanuil Vitorgan; Oleg Vidov; Mikhail Gluzsky
- Cinematography: Vladimir Chumak
- Edited by: Lyudmila Butuzova
- Music by: Leonid Garin; Vladislav Uspensky
- Production company: Lenfilm
- Release date: 1970
- Running time: 128 minutes
- Country: Soviet Union
- Language: Russian

Mission in Kabul (Russian: Миссия в Кабуле, romanized: Missiya v Kabule) is a 1970 Soviet mystery drama film directed by Leonid Kvinikhidze.

== Plot ==
The film takes place in Afghanistan in 1919. The film tells about the struggle of the mission in Kabul with representatives of the West for signing a cooperation agreement.

== Cast ==
- Oleg Zhakov as Pyotr Petrovich Sorokin
- Irina Miroshnichenko as Marina Arkadyevna Luzhina
- Gleb Strizhenov as Gedeonov
- Emmanuil Vitorgan as Kalnin
- Oleg Vidov as Skazkin (voiced by Alexander Demyanenko)
- Mikhail Gluzsky as Garri
- Aleksandr Demyanenko as Smykov
- Vladimir Zamansky as Aleksey Repin
- Vladimir Zeldin as Major Stein
- Vladimir Etush as Abdulla-Khan
- Otar Koberidze as Mohammed Nadir Shah
- Algimantas Masiulis as Gerhard Epp
- Gennadi Nilov as Soviet diplomat Ivan Kolokoltsev

== Interesting facts ==
Famous Buddhas of Bamiyan can be seen in the movie.
