= Vytautas Žalakevičius =

Lithuanian film director and screenwriter

- Born: 14 April 1930; Kaunas, Lithuania
- Died: 12 November 1996 (aged 66); Vilnius, Lithuania
- Occupations: Film director, screenwriter
- Years active: 1956–1992

Vytautas Žalakevičius (14 April 1930 – 12 November 1996) was a Lithuanian film director and screenwriter. His 1973 film That Sweet Word: Liberty! won the Golden Prize at the 8th Moscow International Film Festival.

== Biography ==
Vytautas Žalakevičius studied mathematics and engineering at Kaunas University for two years. From 1951 to 1956 he studied film directing under Mikheil Chiaureli and Grigori Aleksandrov at VGIK in Moscow. He shot to fame with his 1956 film Adam wants to be a man starring Donatas Banionis and his teacher, Juozas Miltinis. His best known film, Nobody Wanted to Die, starring Lithuanian and Latvian actors, brought him international recognition. From 1974 to 1980, Žalakevičius was a staff director at Mosfilm. However, his Moscow period was less productive, so he returned to Lithuania. Žalakevičius devoted himself to establishing an independent Lithuanian film industry, and still worked with an international cast of Lithuanian, Russian, and Latvian actors. He also taught directing and writing and worked for television.

== Recognition ==
Vytautas Žalakevičius was Artistic Director of the Lithuanian Film Studio. He was designated People's Artist of the Lithuanian SSR (1981) and People's Artist of the RSFSR (1980). He was co-chairman of the Lithuanian State Committee for Cinematography and member of the Lithuanian Writers' Union and the Union of Soviet Writers.

- 1962 LSSR State Prize, for the film "Adam Wants to Be a Man"
- 1965 Honored Artist of the LSSR
- 1966 Lenin Komsomol Prize
- 1967 USSR State Prize, for the film "Nobody Wanted to Die"
- 1980 People's Artist of the RSFSR
- 1981 People's Artist of the LSSR
- 1984 LSSR State Prize (with others)
- 1995 Commander's Cross of the Order of the Lithuanian Grand Duke Gediminas

== Filmography ==
- 1956: Skenduolis [The Drowned Man] (graduation work, short)
- 1959: Adam Wants to Be a Man
- 1963: A Chronicle of One Day
- 1965: Nobody Wanted to Die (Niekas nenorėjo mirti)
- 1968: Feelings, Lithuanian Film Studios
- 1970: The Whole Truth about Columbus (Visa teisybė apie Kolumbą)
  The first film of the "Latin American Trilogy" (sequels: That Sweet Word: Liberty!, Centaurs)
- 1973: That Sweet Word: Liberty! (Это сладкое слово — свобода!)
- 1974: Breakdown (Авария) TV film
- 1978: Centaurs (Kentaurai)
- 1980: Story of an Unknown Man (Рассказ неизвестного человека)
- 1981: Faktas (screenplay)
- 1982: Apology (Atsiprašau)
- 1987: Sunday in hell (Savaitgalį pragare)
- 1991: Tale of a non-turned-off Moon (Žvėris, išeinantis iš jūros)
