= Žalakevičius =

- Lithuanian surname
- m.: Žalakevičius
- f.: (unmarried): Žalakevičiūtė
- f.: (married): Žalakevičienė

Žalakevičius is a Lithuanian-language surname. Notable people with the surname include:

- Mečislovas Žalakevičius (born 1949), award-winning Lithuanian scientist, habilitated doctor in ecology
- Vytautas Žalakevičius (14 April 1930 – 12 November 1996) was a Lithuanian film director and screenwriter
