= Liudas Vilimas =

Lithuanian painter

- Born: September 15, 1912; Kušlėnai, Russian Empire (now Lithuania)
- Died: October 22, 1966; Cleveland, Ohio

Liudas Vilimas (September 15, 1912 in Kušlėnai, Russian Empire (now Lithuania) – August 22, 1966 in Cleveland, Ohio) was a Lithuanian painter. His works included book illustrations, theatrical decorations, paintings, postal stamps, window showcases. His earlier works are expressionist, while later have features of abstractionism. While in Lithuania, he favored watercolors later transitioning to oil paintings and figure compositions.

In 1935, he graduated from Kaunas School of Arts. In 1938 he continued his studies in the Academy of Applied Arts Vienna, Austria. In 1940, he helped to establish Panevėžys Drama Theatre and was its chief decorator. After moving to Vilnius, he lectured at Vilnius Academy of Art and became director of Museum of Red Terror, which collected evidence of Soviet persecutions during the first Soviet occupation of Lithuania. To avoid retaliation, he retreated to Germany ahead of the advancing Red Army in 1944. He helped Vytautas Kazimieras Jonynas establish a Lithuanian art institute in Freiburg im Breisgau, and his works were featured at an art exhibit in the United States in 1948. In 1949, he immigrated to the United States, where he was involved in the Lithuanian emigrant community. He worked as the display designer for H. & S. Pogue Company in Cincinnati, Ohio. He died in Cleveland, Ohio, 1966.
