= Forests in Lithuania =

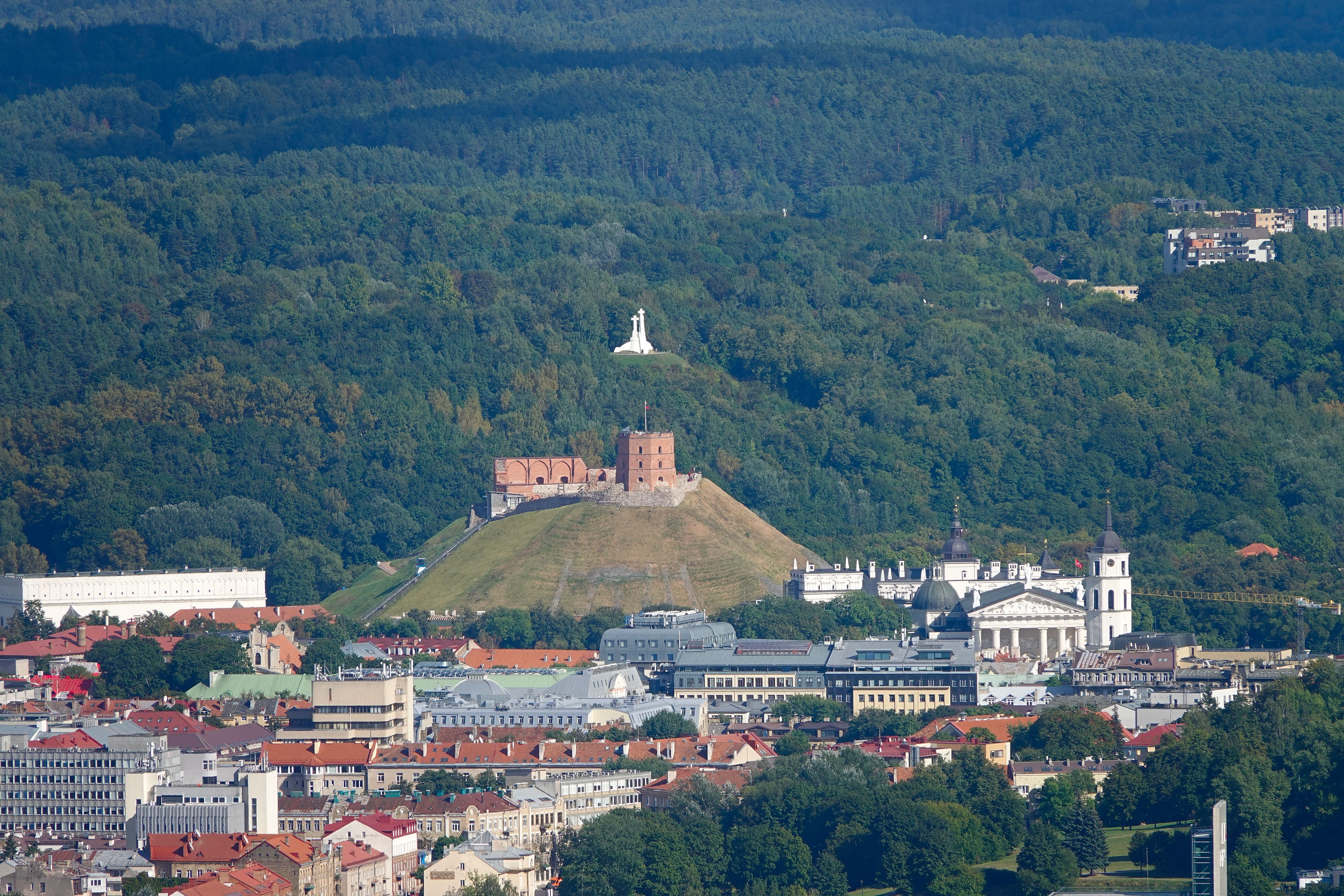
Forests in Vilnius (Kalnai Park)

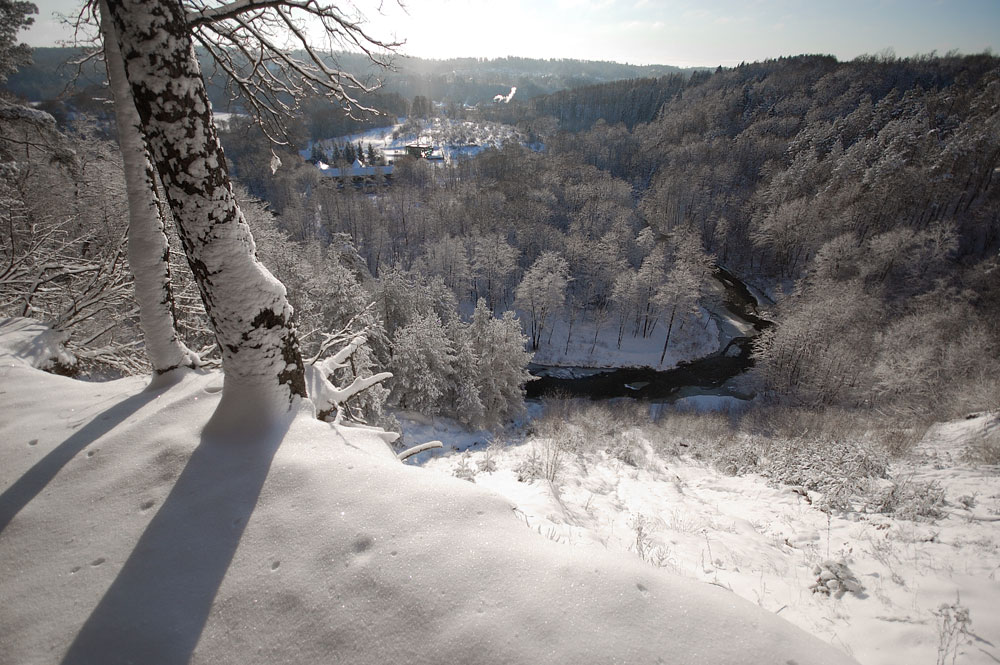
Pavilniai Regional Park

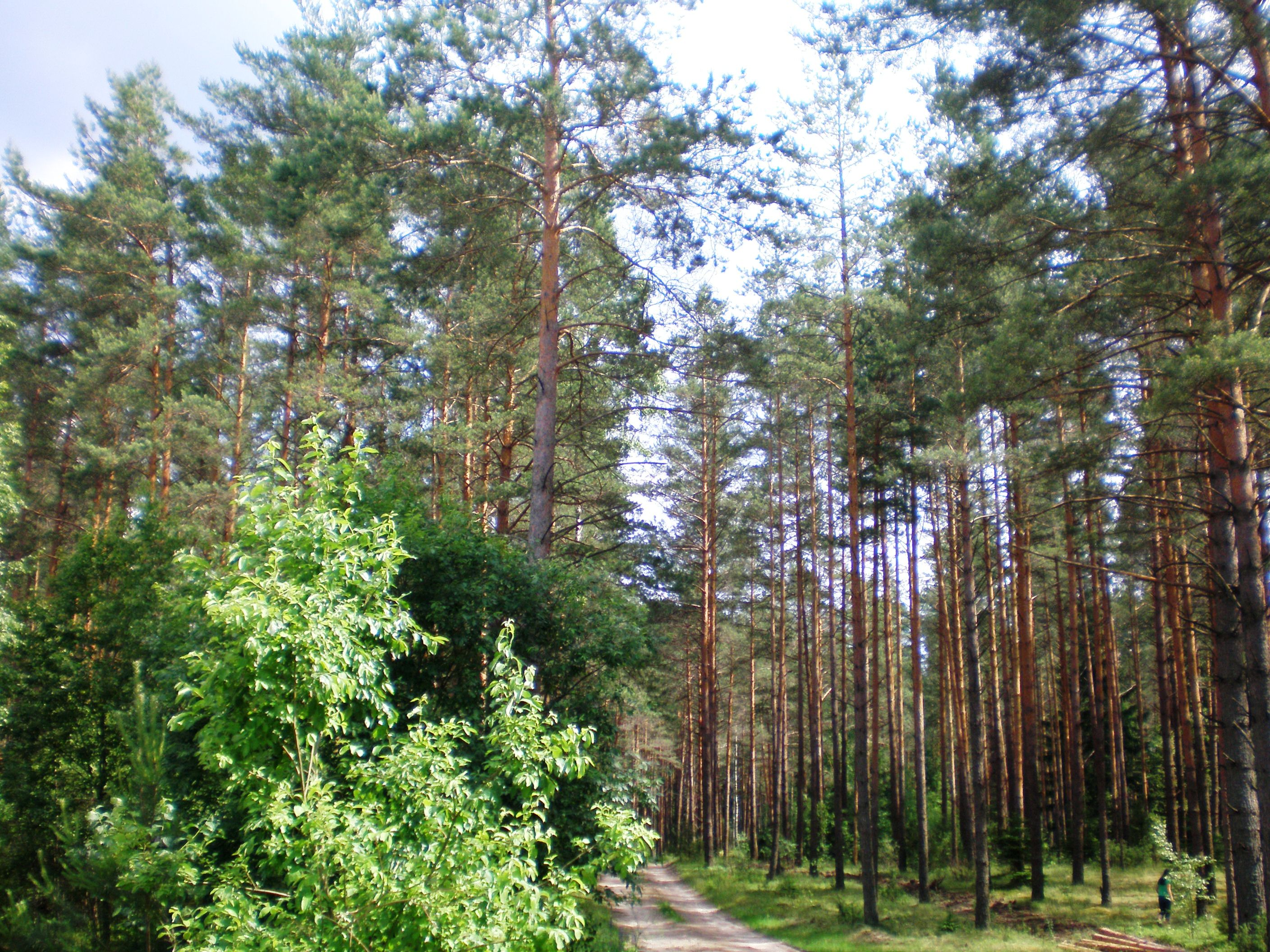
Dainava Forest

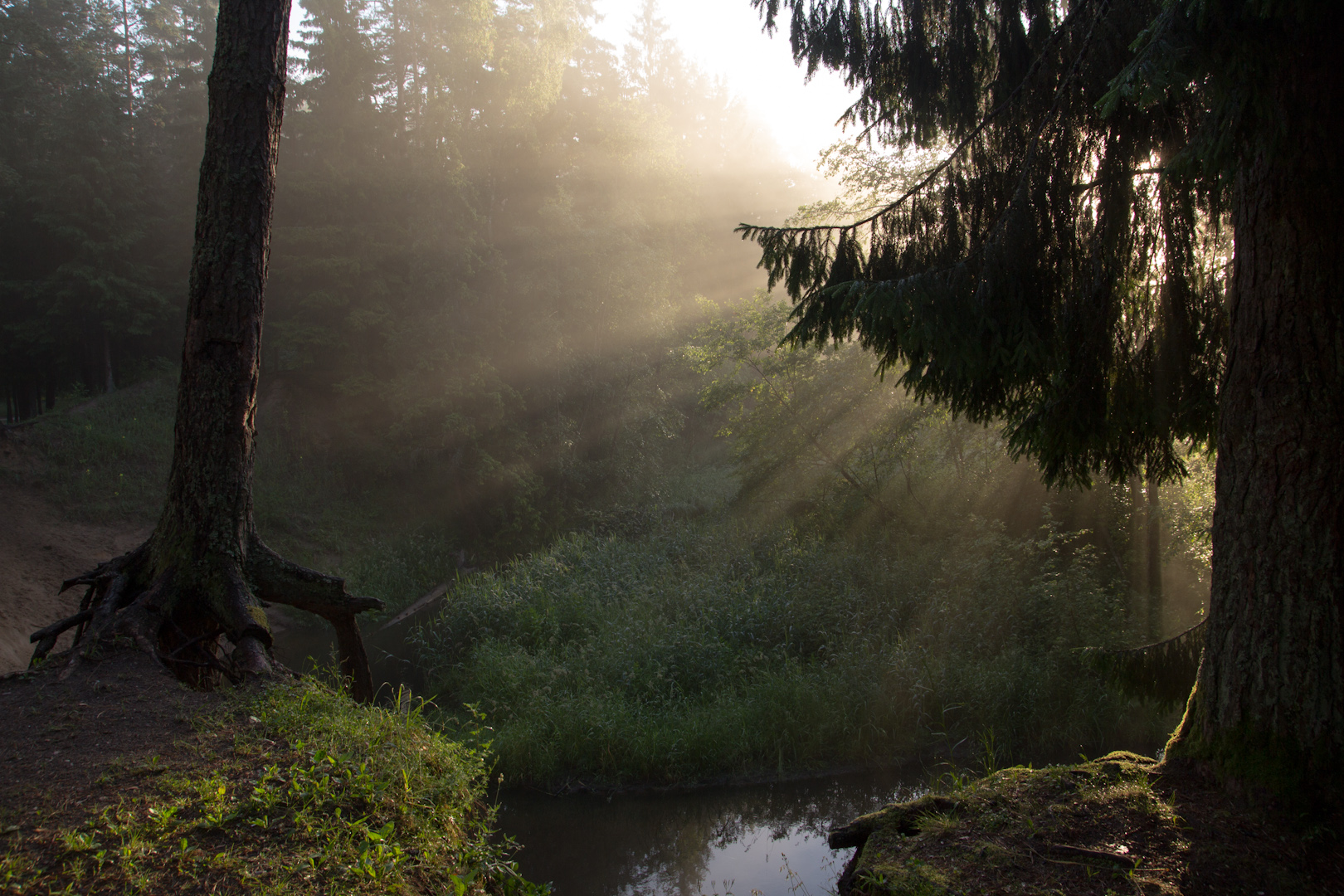
Bubiai-Padubysis-Forest, Šiauliai

Forests in Lithuania cover approximately one third of Lithuania's territory. Of these, around half are publicly owned, and one third are privately owned; the remainder is reserved for possible future privatization. The dominant species are Scots pine (Pinus sylvestris) (42%) and spruce (Picea abies) (22.8%). The average age of the forest stands is 53 years. The largest forest is Dainava Forest at 1,290 km^{2}.

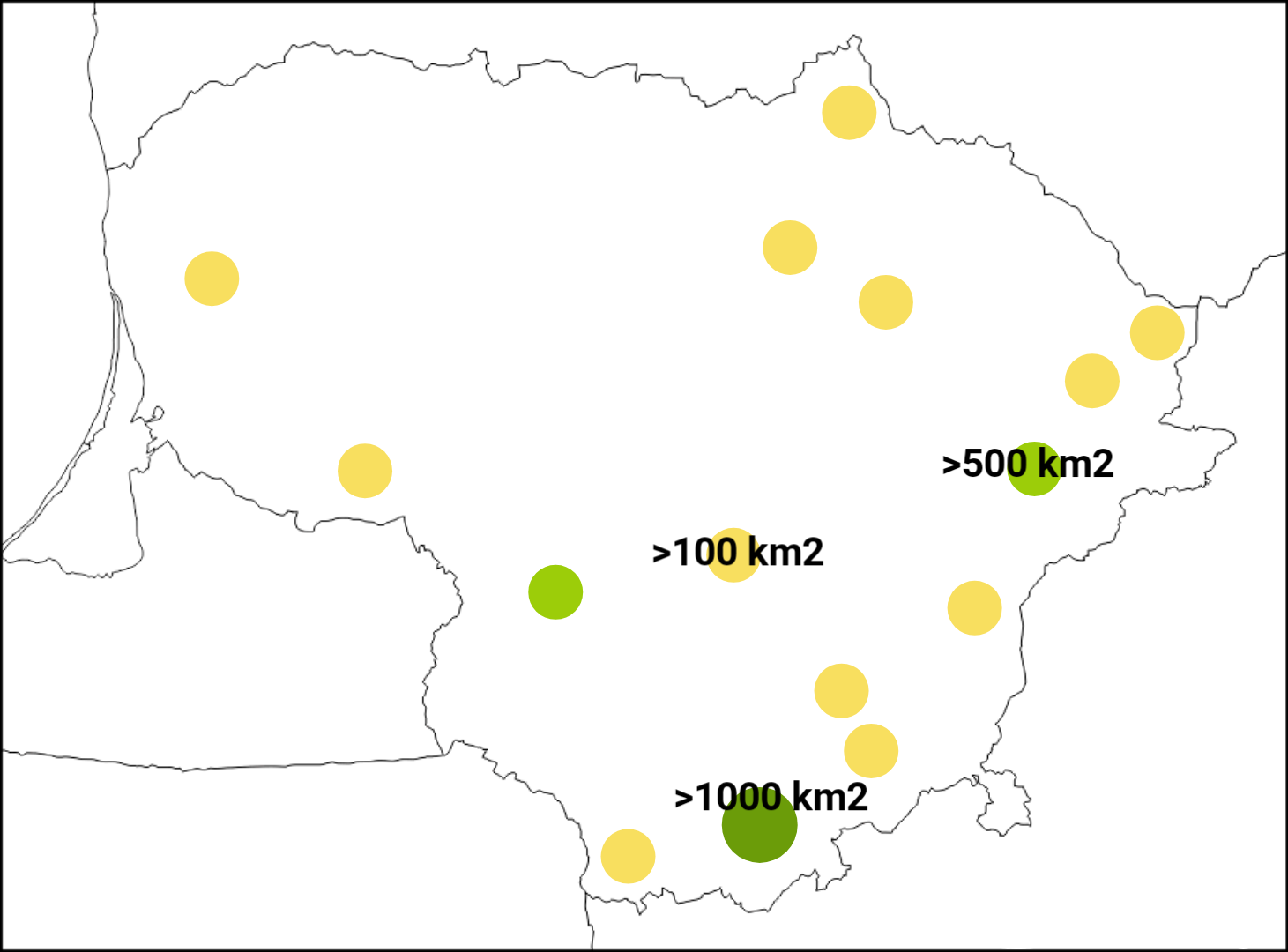
Largest forests in Lithuania

== List ==
Largest forests	Location	Forest area (km^{2})
Dainava Forest (Druskininkai–Varėna Forest)	Alytus County	1,290
Labanoras Forest (Labanoras–Pabradė Forest)	Vilnius County/ Utena County	738
Kazlų Rūda Forest	Marijampolė County/ Kaunas County	470
Karšuva Forest (Smalininkai–Viešvilė Forest)	Tauragė County	359
Rūdninkai Forest	Vilnius County/ Alytus County	329
Lavoriškės Forest (Lavoriškės–Nemenčinė Forest)	Vilnius County	275
Gaižiūnai Forest (Rumšiškės–Gaižiūnai Forest)	Kaunas County	239
Ažvinčiai-Minčia Forest	Utena County	239
Kapčiamiestis Forest	Alytus County	238
Rūdiškiai Forest (Inkleriškės–Rūdiškiai Forest)	Vilnius County/ Alytus County	195
Biržai Forest	Panevėžys County	154
Šimonys Forest	Utena County; Panevėžys County	135
Kuliai Forest	Telšiai County; Klaipėda County	127
Žalioji Forest	Panevėžys County	126
Sausašilis-Tumiškė Forest	Utena County	99
Taujėnai Forest	Vilnius County	83
Gitėnai Forest	Panevėžys County	80
Pažižmė-Tryškiai Forest	Šiauliai County; Telšiai County	70
Troškūnai–Dabužiai Forest	Utena County	69
Tauragė–Batakiai Forest	Tauragė County	68
Girkančiai-Tyrelis Forest	Šiauliai County	67
Ramuldava Forest	Utena County	67
Begėdžiai-Radvietis Forest	Klaipėda County/ Tauragė County	67
Gustoniai–Jakuboniai Forest	Panevėžys County	66
Dusmena Forest	Alytus County/ Vilnius County	65
Tyrelis Forest	Tauragė County	64
Plokštinė-Stirbaičiai Forest	Telšiai County	64
Klusiškiai Forest	Šiauliai County	63
Prienai Forest	Kaunas County	63
Žagarė Forest	Šiauliai County	57
Latveliškiai-Agailiai Forest	Šiauliai County	56
Raguva–Alančiai Forest	Panevėžys County	54
Laukžemė–Palanga Forest	Klaipėda County	54
Subartonys Forest	Alytus County	53
Žalgiris-Pamarkija Forest	Telšiai County	52
Rietavas Forest (Judrėnai–Lėgai Forest)	Telšiai County/ Klaipėda County/ Tauragė County	50
Dubrava Forest	Kaunas County	50
Lančiūnava-Šventybrastis Forest	Kaunas County	50
Kazokiškės-Kaugonys Forest	Vilnius County/ Kaunas County	48
Varluva–Babtai Forest	Kaunas County	47
Tytuvėnai Forest	Kaunas County; Šiauliai County	45
Varnabūdė Forest	Marijampolė County	44
Gražutė Forest	Utena County	42
Šešuoliai Forest	Vilnius County	40
Adutiškis Forest	Vilnius County	39
Liaudiškiai–Mažuoliai Forest	Šiauliai County	36
Pernarava-Šaravai Forest	Kaunas County	33
Pagramantis Forest (Pagramantis–Didkiemis Forest)	Tauragė County	33
Balbieriškis Forest	Marijampolė County/ Kaunas County	32
Medingėnai-Milašaičiai Forest	Telšiai County	31
Josvainiai Forest	Kaunas County	30
Krakės-Dotnuva Forest	Kaunas County	29
Lapkalnys-Paliepiai Forest	Kaunas County	28
Bukta Forest	Marijampolė County	28
Kamanos Forest	Šiauliai County	28
Tverai–Patyris Forest	Telšiai County	28
Alsėdžiai-Pagermantė Forest	Telšiai County	28
Alionys Forest	Kaunas County	26
Punia Forest	Alytus County	25
Vainutas Forest	Klaipėda County/ Utena County	17
Taujėnai Forest	Vilnius County/ Panevėžys County	15
Labūnava Forest	Kaunas County	13
Paupys–Knyzlaukis Forest	Vilnius County	12
Paupys Forest	Kaunas County/ Tauragė County	12
Kurtuvėnai Forest	Šiauliai County	12
Klišiai–Tyrai Forest	Klaipėda County	11
Gruzdžiai–Gubernija Forest	Šiauliai County	10

Lithuania encompasses about 65,200 square km. Based on an estimated average of 100 trees per hectare, there are over 200 million trees in Lithuania.

== Literature ==
- Edvardas Riepšas. Lietuvos miškai. Visuotinė lietuvių enciklopedija, T. XII (Lietuva). – Vilnius: Mokslo ir enciklopedijų leidybos institutas, 2007. 66 psl.
