= Bruno O'Ya =

Estonian-Polish actor

- Born: Bruno Oja; 12 February 1933; Tallinn, Estonia
- Died: 9 October 2002 (aged 69); Tartu, Estonia
- Occupations: Actor, musician

Bruno O'Ya (born Bruno Oja; 12 February 1933 – 9 October 2002) was an Estonian-Polish actor. In 1974 he starred in the Academy Award-nominated film The Deluge under Jerzy Hoffman. He also appeared in the 1978 film Centaurs. He released a folk album with 12 songs in 1973.

== Biography ==
Born on February 12, 1933, in Tallinn, O'Ya was born to Verner and Hilda Oja; his brother was Kenno Oja. He was married four times, and has a daughter, Dominika. O'Ya studied piano with the Estonian composer Eugen Kapp. He was part of a pop music group in Tartu in 1951 and the Riga Teacher's House dance orchestra from 1956–1964. From the late the 1960s, he mainly lived and worked in Wrocław, Poland, but did not renounce his Soviet citizenship, as that was how he was able to visit Estonia. In 1967, he changed his Estonian surname to a foreign one, henceforth writing the surname with a y and adding an apostrophe after the first letter in order to simplify foreign contact.

== Later years ==
After Estonia regained its independence, O'Ya returned to Estonia, where he supervised a youth theater. On the initiative of Foreign Minister Trivim Velliste, O'Ya became the cultural attaché and honorary consul of the Republic of Estonia in Poland. In 1998 he suffered a stroke. He died on October 9, 2002, in Tartu. He is buried at the Metsakalmistu Cemetery.

== Partial filmography ==
- Tava laime (1960)
- 49 dney (1962) – Amerikanskiy matros
- The Road to Berth (1962) – Bruno
- Generali da zizilebi (1963) – Vladec Lekhovski
- Vystrel v tumane (1964) – Binkley attache
- The Lark (1965) – Obersturmbannfuhrer
- Pomni, Kaspar! (1965)
- Time, Forward! (1965) – Thomas Bicksby
- Nobody Wanted to Die (1965) – sunus Bronius
- Na odnoy planete (1965) – American journalist
- The Hyperboloid of Engineer Garin (1965) – Captain Yansen
- Kiedy milosc byla zbrodnia (1968) – American Prisoner
- Wilcze echa (1968) – chorazy Piotr Slotwina
- The Red Tent (1969) – Norwegian Radio Operator (uncredited)
- Tödlicher Irrtum (1970) – Hank Jackson
- Pulapka (1971) – Anton
- Chyornye sukhari (1972)
- Copernicus (1973) – Chorazy niosacy sztandar (uncredited)
- Opetanie (1973) – Wlasciciel kawalerki
- The Deluge (1974) – Józwa Butrym
- Svatbite na Yoan Asen (1975) – Knyaz Yuriy
- Kazimierz Wielki (1976) – Spytek z Melsztyna
- Tuntematon ystävä (1978) – Bruno Lindén / 'Furman' / 'priest'
- Centaurs (1979) – Nilson
- Poslední propadne peklu (1982) – Hoff
- Ostrze na ostrze (1983) – Jacek Dydynski
- Glowy pelne gwiazd (1983) – Oficer radzieski
- Wedle wyroków twoich... (1984)
- Czas dojrzewania (1984) – Swede Haakon
- Na calosc (1986) – Scandinavian
- Rykowisko (1987) – Senator Mickey Caposta
- Pociag do Hollywood (1987)
- Pan Kleks w kosmosie (1988) – (final film role)
