= Surdegis =

- Town
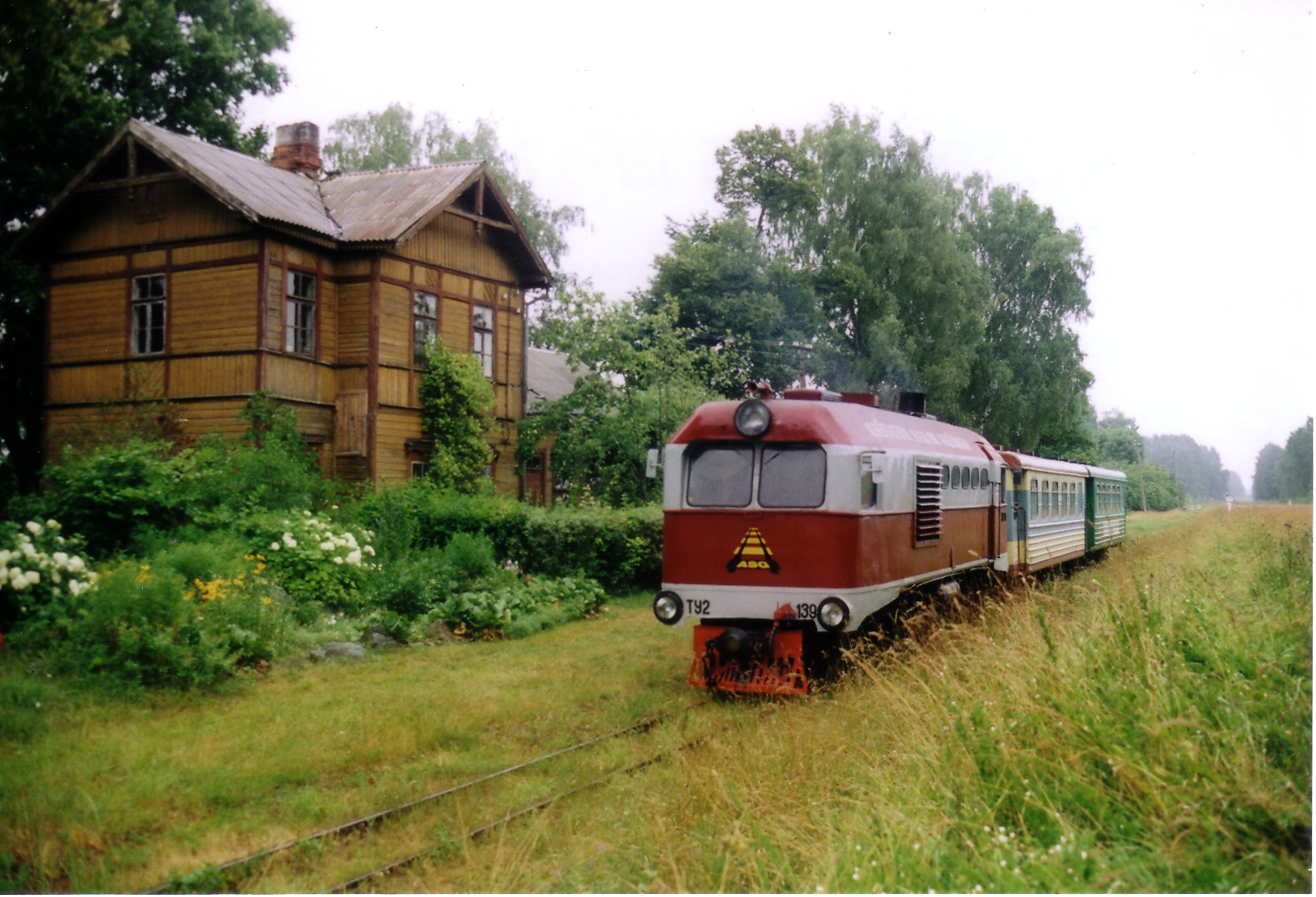

- Location within Lithuania
- Coordinates: 55°40′10″N 24°48′30″E
- Country: Lithuania
- County: Utena County
- Municipality: Anykščiai

Population (2011)
  - Total: 158
- Time zone: UTC+2 (EET)
  - Summer (DST): UTC+3 (EEST)

Surdegis is a town in Anykščiai district municipality, in Utena County, in northeast Lithuania. According to the 2011 census, the town had a population of 158 people.

== Notable residents ==
- Algimantas Masiulis (1931–2008), actor
