= That Sweet Word: Liberty! =

1972 film by Vytautas Žalakevičius

- Directed by: Vytautas Žalakevičius
- Written by: Valentin Yezhov; Vytautas Žalakevičius
- Starring: Lorents Arushanyan; Regimantas Adomaitis; Irina Miroshnichenko
- Cinematography: Vladimir Nakhabtsev
- Music by: Vyacheslav Ovchinnikov
- Production companies: Mosfilm; Lithuanian Film Studio
- Release date: 1972
- Running time: 154 minutes
- Country: Soviet Union
- Language: Russian

That Sweet Word: Liberty! (Russian: Это сладкое слово — свобода!, translit. Eto sladkoye slovo — svoboda!) is a 1972 Soviet thriller film co-written and directed by Vytautas Žalakevičius. The second part of the "Latin American trilogy", of which the first film was The Whole Truth about Columbus and the final one Centaurs. It was entered into the 8th Moscow International Film Festival where it won the Golden Prize. The film was shot in Chile shortly before the 1973 Chilean coup d'état. The basis for the plot is a real story: the escape from San-Carlos prison in Venezuela of three political prisoners — Guillermo García Ponce, Pompeyo Márquez and Teodoro Petkoff.

== Plot ==
In an unnamed Latin American country after a coup d'état, a military junta comes to power. The army deployed to the streets, the civilian population is exposed to hard terror. A wave of arrests follows, some former senators - liberals and communists - are sent to prison.

Some patriots that have gone underground try to figure a plan for their release. They buy a small shop opposite the prison in the name of Francisco and Maria Vardes. From its basement they plan to build a 90-meter tunnel.

Three years of enormous effort, deaths and nervous breakdowns are not spent in vain. The inmates run away, but while at large, the oldest of them, Senator Miguel Carrera suffers a heart failure. He dies in a safe house on the eve of a meeting with journalists.

== Cast ==
- Lorents Arushanyan as Walter Conde, senator
- Regimantas Adomaitis as Francisco "Pancho" Vardes'
- Bronius Babkauskas as Miguel Carrera, senator (voiced by Valentin Gaft)
- Juozas Budraitis as Felicio, blackmailer (voiced by Valentin Nikulin)
- Irina Miroshnichenko as Maria
- Rodion Nakhapetov as Benedicto
- Ion Ungureanu as Alberto Ramirez
- Vytautas Paukštė as prison doctor
- Mihai Volontir as Carlos
