= Centaurs (film) =

1978 film

- Directed by: Vytautas Žalakevičius
- Written by: Vytautas Žalakevičius
- Starring: Donatas Banionis; Regimantas Adomaitis; Margit Lukach; Yevgeni Lebedev
- Cinematography: Pavel Lebeshev
- Music by: Roland Kazarian
- Production companies: Mosfilm; Mafilm; Barrandov Studios
- Release date: 1978
- Running time: 140 minutes
- Countries: Soviet Union; Hungary; Czechoslovakia; Colombia
- Language: Russian

Centaurs (Russian: Кентавры, romanized: Kentavri) is a 1978 political drama film directed by Vytautas Žalakevičius. The film was the final part of the "Latin American trilogy" (The Whole Truth about Columbus, That Sweet Word: Liberty!).

== Plot ==
The action takes place in an unnamed state in a Latin American county (implied to be Chile). In the military circles a conspiracy is forming, fired up by foreign special services. The action, codenamed "Centaur", is conceived in Washington. The people believe in the president, but the conspirators, headed by General Pin, are gaining strength to organize a coup.

== Cast ==
- Donatas Banionis – President (voiced by Igor Kvasha)
- Regimantas Adomaitis – Orlando, director of the Bureau of Investigations (voiced by Vyacheslav Shalevich)
- Margit Lukács – president's wife
- Yevgeni Lebedev – General Pin
- Gyula Benkő– General Catalan
- Elena Ivochkina – Anna Maria
- Irén Sütő – mother of Anna Maria
- Gennadi Bortnikov – Anibal
- Itka Zelenogorskaya – Julie
- Valentin Gaft – Andres, conspirator
- Ion Ungureanu – Minister of Toroa
- Mihai Volontir – Evaristo
- Bruno O'Ya – Nilsson, Swedish Journalist
- Valery Anisimov – Captain Grets
- Kakhi Kavsadze – Ugo, the barman
- Valery Kuzin – General
- Nodar Mgaloblishvili – Minister Miguel
- Juozas Budraitis – Raymond
- Dumitru Fusu
