= Faktas =

1981 film

- Film poster
- Directed by: Almantas Grikevičius
- Written by: Vytautas Zalakevicius
- Starring: Regimantas Adomaitis; Donatas Banionis; Juozas Budraitis
- Release date: 1981
- Running time: 91 minutes
- Country: Soviet Union
- Languages: Russian, Lithuanian

Faktas (English: "Fact", alternative Russian title: Группа крови „Ноль“, romanized: Gruppa krovi nol, "Blood Group Zero") is a 1981 Soviet Lithuanian-language war film directed by Almantas Grikevičius.

The film is a recreation based on documents of an actual historical fact from World War II, the Pirčiupiai massacre: on June 3, 1944, German soldiers burned the village of Pirčiupiai with all 119 of its inhabitants.

== Cast ==
- Regimantas Adomaitis as Jonas Buckus
- Vaiva Mainelytė, Kazia, Jonas's wife
- Donatas Banionis, Colonel Titelis
- Juozas Budraitis
- Uldis Dumpis, Šmidermanas
- Aleksandr Kaidanovsky
- Irena Leonavičiūtė, Teklė, daughter of Peciukonis
- Arnis Līcītis
- Algimantas Masiulis, Peciukonis
- Laimonas Noreika "Džanas-amerikonas" ("John the American")
- Yelena Solovey
- Leonid Obolensky, shepherd Aleksandras
- Eugenija Pleskyte
- Kostas Smoriginas, investigator's voice

== Awards ==
- Main Prize at the 14th All-Union Film Festival (1981).
- The film was entered into the 1981 Cannes Film Festival under the title Gruppa krovi nol, where Yelena Solovey won the award for Best Supporting Actress in Feature Films.
