= Lyudmila Senchina =

Russian singer (?-2018)

Background information
- Born: Lyudmila Petrovna Senchina; 13 December 1950; Kudryavtsy, Ukrainian SSR, Soviet Union
- Died: 25 January 2018 (aged 67) Saint Petersburg, Russia
- Genres: Soviet estrada, traditional pop, synthpop
- Occupation(s): Singer, actress
- Years active: 1970–2018
- Labels: Melodiya
- Website: ludmilasenchina.ru

Lyudmila Petrovna Senchina (Russian: Людми́ла Петро́вна Се́нчина; 13 January 1948 or 13 December 1950, – 25 January 2018) was a Soviet and Russian singer (soprano). In 1979 she was awarded the title of Meritorious Artist of the RSFSR and in 2002 the title of People's Artist of Russia. Merited Artist of Ukraine (2003). She made popular such songs as Cinderella (Russian: Золушка), Stones (Russian: Камушки), Love and Separation (Russian: Любовь и разлука), White Acacia (Russian: Белая акация), Birthday (Russian: День рождения), White Dance (Russian: Белый танец), Field Flowers (Russian: Полевые цветы).

Senchina also acted in several movies. Her most famous film was Armed and Dangerous (Russian: Вооружён и очень опасен), in which she played the lead female role.

Senchina died on January 25, 2018, in a hospital in St. Petersburg after a long illness.

== Discography ==
Studio albums

- 1975 — Поет Людмила Сенчина (English: Lyudmila Senchina Sings)
- 1981 — Людмила Сенчина (English: Lyudmila Senchina)
- 1984 — Любовь и разлука (English: Love and Separation)
- 2008 — Хоть поверьте, хоть проверьте... (English: At Least Believe Me, at Least Check It Out...)

Singles

- "Ты хочешь со мною расстаться" (1975) (feat. Gennadiy Boyka)
- "Людмила Сенчина и группа Стаса Намина" (1982)
- "Аист на крыше" (1986)

Compilations

- 2001 — А любовь смеётся и поёт
- 2004 — Любовное настроение
- 2008 — Золотая коллекция ретро
- 2008 — Поёт Людмила Сенчина
