= Nobody Wanted to Die =

- Directed by: Vytautas Žalakevičius
- Written by: Vytautas Žalakevičius
- Starring: Regimantas Adomaitis; Juozas Budraitis; Algimantas Masiulis; Donatas Banionis
- Cinematography: Jonas Gricius
- Edited by: Izabelė Pinaitytė
- Music by: Algimantas Apanavicius
- Production company: Lithuanian Film Studios
- Release date: December 24, 1965
- Running time: 100 minutes
- Country: Soviet Union
- Language: Lithuanian

Nobody Wanted to Die (Lithuanian: Niekas nenorėjo mirti, Russian: Никто не хотел умирать) is a 1965 Lithuanian film made in Soviet Lithuania and directed by Vytautas Žalakevičius. Žalakevičius, actor Donatas Banionis, and cinematographer Jonas Gricius were awarded USSR State Prize for the film in 1967. It is recognized as the first Soviet film to portray the lives of the Lithuanian partisans.

== Plot ==
Set in 1947, during the establishment of Soviet authority in Lithuania, the story takes place in a rural village torn by postwar struggles. Residents face difficult choices, caught between supporting Soviet rule or the resistance led by the Forest Brothers. Lokis, the chairman of the village council, is assassinated by Domovoi’s supporters—marking him as the fifth chairman killed that year. Lokis' sons vow to avenge his death.

To replace Lokis, Vaitkus, a former member of the Forest Brothers resistance group, is forcibly appointed as the new chairman. The tension between villagers and the Forest Brothers escalates, culminating in an assault on the village by resistance fighters. The Lokis brothers, determined to defend their home and ideals, successfully repel the attack, defeating the assailants.

== Production ==
The film was shot at the Toliūnai Manor in Pasvalys District and featured additional scenes filmed at the Maslauskiškiai Watermill in Raseiniai District.

The black-and-white, widescreen film runs for 107 minutes (1 hour 47 minutes).

== Significance and reception ==
The film received critical acclaim and is considered a significant work in the history of Lithuanian cinema. However, as it was created during the Soviet occupation of Lithuania, the film remains controversial due to its ideological portrayal of important historical events. Critics have noted its propagandistic undertones and ideological framing of the events.

== Awards ==
- 1966 – Grand Prize at the All-Union Film Festival in Kyiv.
- 1966 – Lenin Komsomol Prize.
- 1967 – USSR State Prize awarded to screenwriter and director Vytautas Žalakevičius, cinematographer Jonas Gricius, and actors Donatas Banionis and Bruno Oja.
- 1967 – Voted the best Soviet film of 1966 by readers of the magazine Soviet Screen.
