= Pirčiupiai =

- Village
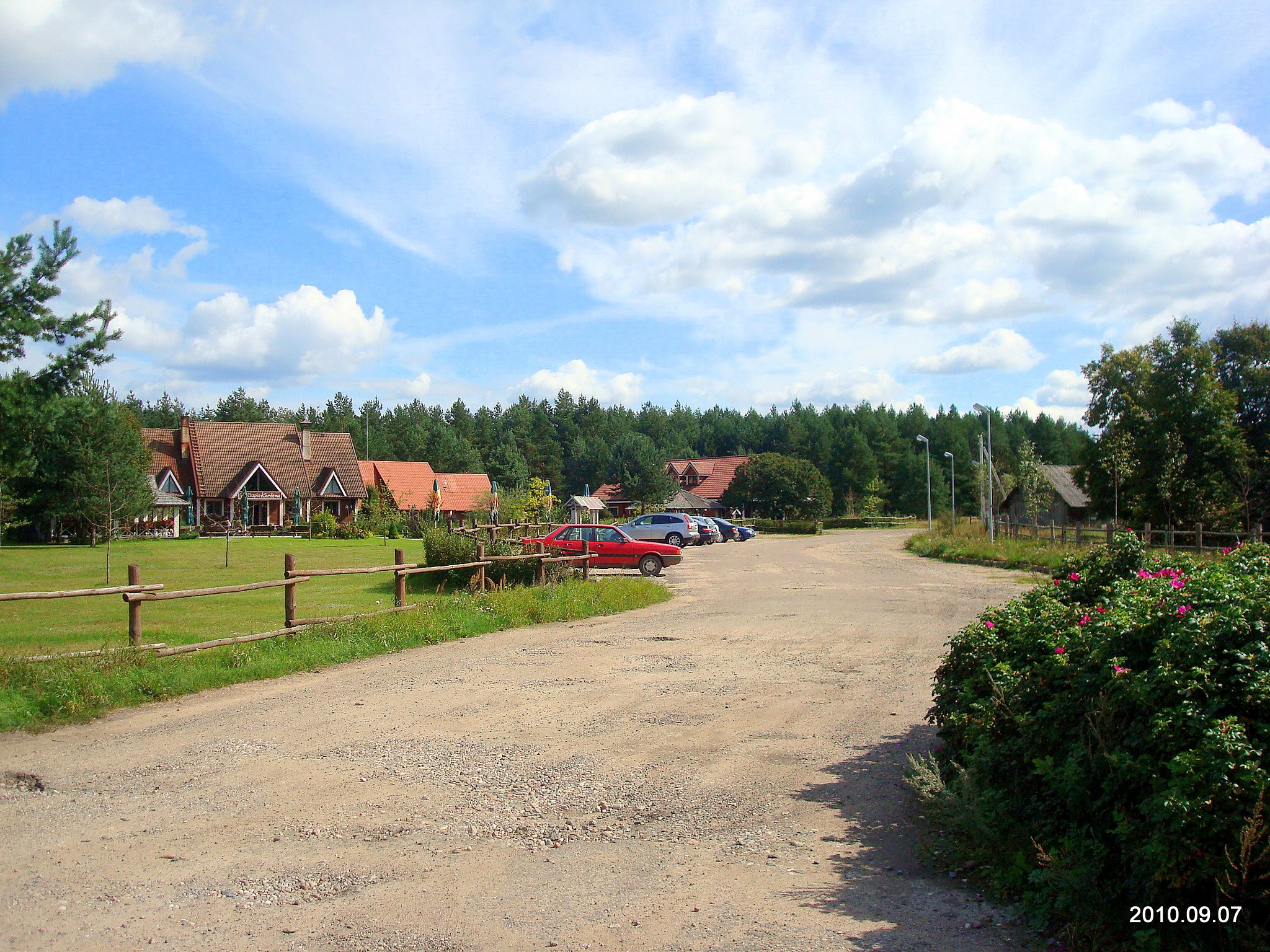

- Location within Varėna District Municipality Location within Lithuania
- Coordinates: 54°24′N 24°57′E
- Country: Lithuania
- Ethnographic region: Dzūkija
- County: Alytus County
- Municipality: Varėna district municipality
- Eldership: Valkininkų (Valkininkai)

Population (2011 Census)
  - Total: 75
- Time zone: UTC+2 (EET)
  - Summer (DST): UTC+3 (EEST)

Pirčiupiai is a village in Valkininkų (Valkininkai) eldership, Varėna district municipality, Alytus County, Dzūkija region, Lithuania. According to the 2001 census, the village had a population of 103 people. At the 2011 census, the population was 75.

The village is in the Rudninkai Forest. The Pirčiupis Rivulet flows through the village. The village is known since the 16th century, when the grand dukes of Lithuania used it as hunting grounds.

== Pirčiupiai massacre ==
On the morning of June 3, 1944, near Pirčiupiai, Soviet partisans placed mines in the path of two trucks carrying SS men, then fired on the survivors. Only a few Germans escaped the ambush.

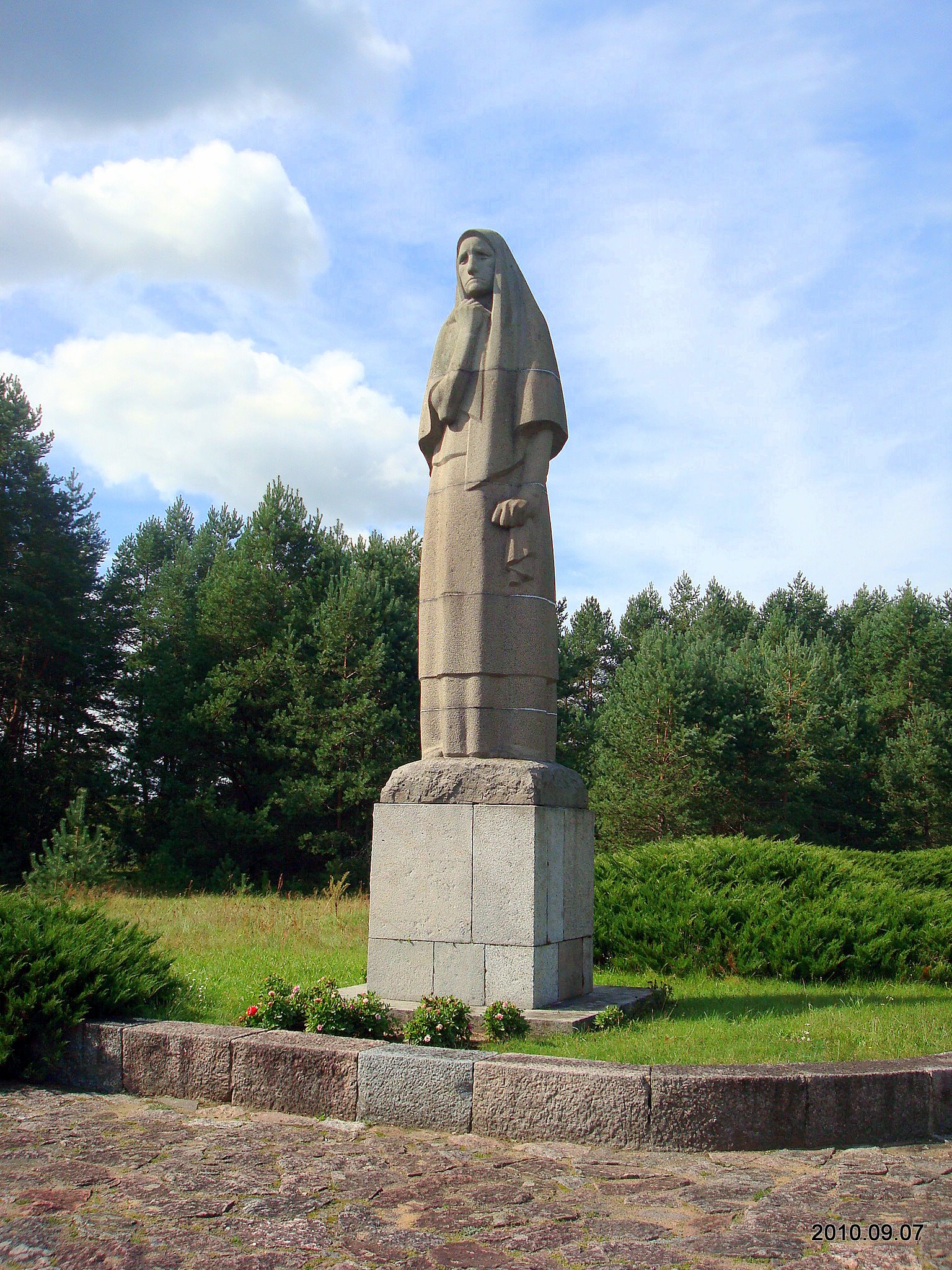
"Mother of Pirčiupiai"

The Germans sent a punishment squadron and burned alive almost all inhabitants of Pirčiupiai. On that day 119 people (including 49 children under age of 16) were killed and only 9 escaped from the Pirčiupiai massacre. The SS Commander Walter Titel of the 16th SS Police Regiment ordered that the civilians be burnt alive. The bodies were allowed to be buried only after a week on June 11, 1944. The 39 former residents of the village had eventually rebuilt it.

In 1960 a monument, called "Mother of Pirčiupiai" was erected to commemorate the event. Its author Gediminas Jokūbonis was awarded the Lenin Prize for it in 1963. The 1981 Lithuanian film Faktas recreates the events of the day.

Several fire sites are fenced off and have memorial plaques.

== See also ==
- Ablinga
