= Snake Catcher =

- Russian: Змеелов
- Directed by: Vadim Derbenyov
- Written by: Lazar Karelin
- Produced by: Aleksandr Gurevich
- Starring: Aleksandr Mikhaylov; Natalya Belokhvostikova; Leonid Markov; Donatas Banionis; Lyubov Polishchuk
- Cinematography: Mikhail Agranovich
- Edited by: R. Pesetskaya
- Music by: Vladimir Chernyshyov; Gennadiy Nazarov
- Production company: Mosfilm
- Release date: 1985
- Running time: 96 min.
- Country: Soviet Union
- Language: Russian

Snake Catcher (Russian: Змеелов, romanized: Zmeelov) is a 1985 Soviet drama film directed by Vadim Derbenyov.

== Plot ==
The film tells about the former director of a large Moscow deli who ended up in a strict regime colony, and after leaving this began to fight criminals.

== Cast ==
- Aleksandr Mikhaylov as Pavel Sergeevich Shorokhov
- Natalya Belokhvostikova as Lena
- Leonid Markov as Pyotr Vasilievich Kotov
- Donatas Banionis as Boris
- Lyubov Polishchuk as Vera
- Svetlana Kryuchkova as Zina
- Leonid Kuravlyov as Konstantin
- Galina Polskikh as Nina
- Valentina Titova as Tamara
- Viktor Shulgin as Anatoly Semyonovich
- Alexander Pyatkov as Stasik
- Igor Starygin as Boris's the guarantor

== Awards ==
- Soviet Screen Award for Best Actor Year (Aleksandr Mikhaylov)

== Critical response ==
Film critic Alexander Fedorov notes in his review:

In phantasmagoric black-and-white dreams, ingeniously filmed by cinematographer Mikhail Agranovich, one can catch echoes of the director's former poetic metaphors, but otherwise Vadim Derbenev tries to keep within the framework of the traditional genre of crime drama. Tries... But comes out superficial and boring.

== See also ==
- OBKhSS
