= Juozas Miltinis Drama Theatre =

Theatre in Panevėžys, Lithuania

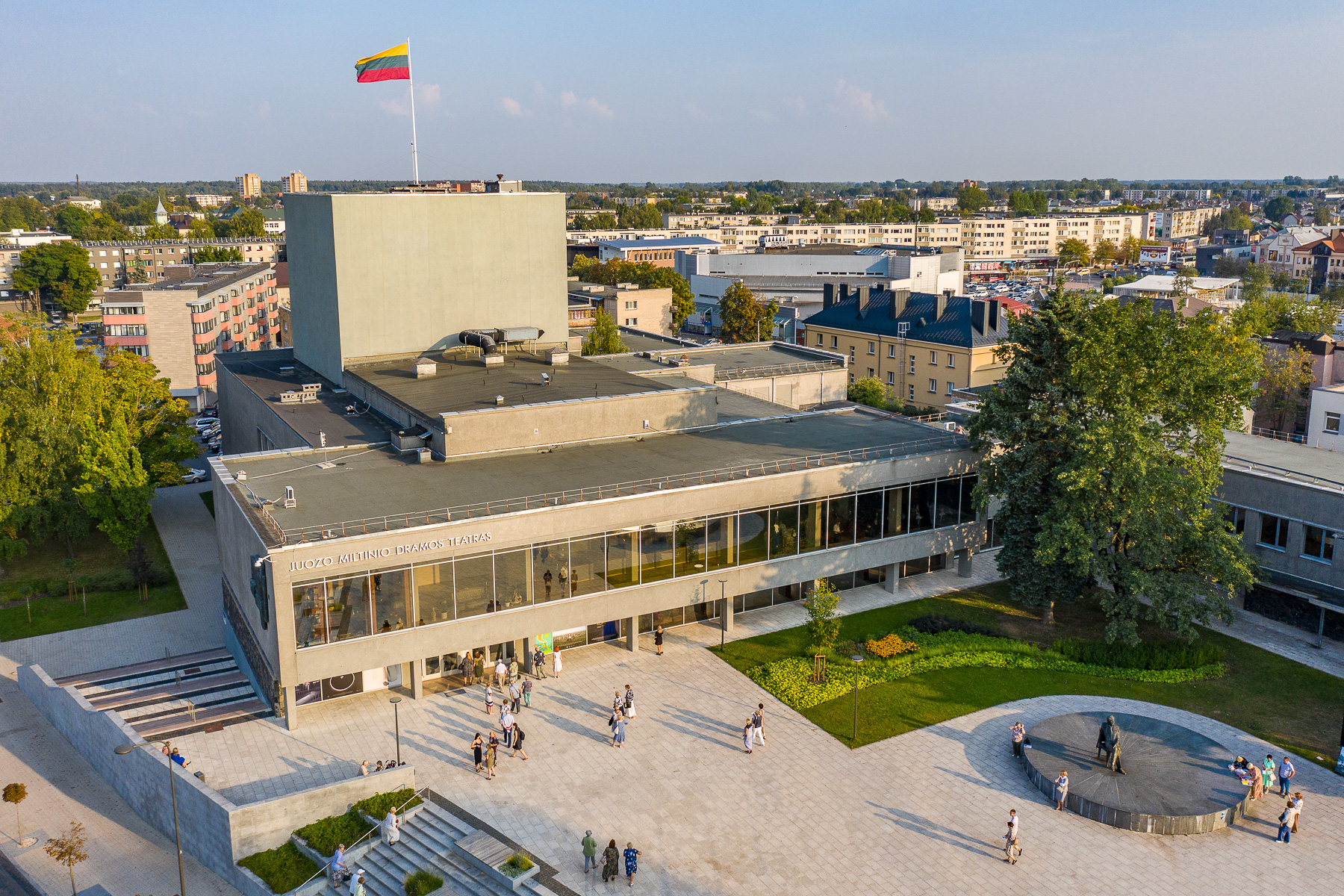
Juozas Miltinis Drama Theatre

Juozas Miltinis’ Drama Theatre (known as Panevėžys Drama Theatre till 1995) is a state theatre in the town of Panevėžys, Lithuania, approximately 130 km north of the capital Vilnius. It is the main place for drama in town with a permanent troupe of actors and large performing spaces. During the Soviet era the theater was well known across the Soviet Union for outstanding performances directed by Juozas Miltinis, a legendary personality, who led the theatre for decades. He worked with actors such as Donatas Banionis (main role in Andrei Tarkovsky’s "Solaris"). Because of its noticeable impact on town's life and culture, the theater continues to maintain a distinct connection with its local audience. Since autumn 2017 a team of young theatre creators have been leading the theatre, who are focusing on developing the creative space, providing opportunities for experiments of emerging directors, allowing actors’ artistic abilities to evolve and creating new experiences for whole theatre team.
