= The Little Prince (1966 film) =

1966 Soviet film

- Russian: Маленький принц
- Directed by: Arūnas Žebriūnas
- Written by: Arūnas Žebriūnas
- Starring: Evaldas Mikalyunas; Donatas Banionis; Otar Koberidze
- Narrated by: Innokenty Smoktunovsky
- Cinematography: Alexandras Digimas
- Music by: Teisutis Makačinas
- Production company: Lithuanian Film Studios
- Release date: December 6, 1966
- Running time: 68 minutes
- Country: Soviet Union
- Language: Lithuanian

The Little Prince (Russian: Маленький принц, romanized: Malenkiy prints; Lithuanian: Mažasis princas) is a 1966 Soviet film directed by Arūnas Žebriūnas, based on the fairy tale of the same name by Antoine de Saint-Exupéry.

== Cast ==
- Evaldas Mikaliūnas as boy
- Donatas Banionis as adult (voiced by Alexander Demyanenko)
- Otar Koberidze as pilot
- Innokenty Smoktunovsky as narrator
