= Armed and Dangerous (1977 film) =

1977 film

Armed and Very Dangerous
- Directed by: Vladimir Vajnshtok
- Written by: Vladimir Vajnshtok; Pavel Finn
- Produced by: Arkady Kushlyansky
- Starring: Donatas Banionis; Mircea Veroiu; Lyudmila Senchina
- Cinematography: Konstantin Ryzhov
- Music by: Georgy Firtich
- Production companies: Gorky Film Studio; Barrandov Studios; Filmstudio Bucuresti
- Release date: January 9, 1978
- Running time: 99 min
- Countries: Soviet Union; Czechoslovak Socialist Republic; Socialist Republic of Romania
- Language: Russian

Armed and Dangerous (Russian: Вооружён и очень опасен, romanized: Vooruzhyon i ochen opasen) is a 1977 Soviet western film. Based on the novel Gabriel Conroy and stories of Bret Harte.

== Plot ==
Set in the late 19th century American Wild West, the story begins with a perilous winter journey through the forest, where a band of outlaws ambushes a group of settlers. Judge Fleming, mortally wounded, entrusts his land rights and a valuable map to a gold prospector named Gabriel Conroy, telling him to seek something hidden on the land. However, Gabriel loses the map, which is found by one of the returning bandits. Years later, Conroy continues his fruitless search for gold or any valuable discovery on his land. Meanwhile, professional gambler Jack Hamlin and journalist Henry York arrive in town and begin investigating the mysterious circumstances of Judge Fleming's death. They soon uncover secrets about millionaire businessman Peter Dumphy, who, as it turns out, was one of the original bandits responsible for the judge's murder. Dumphy, who found and used the map to amass his wealth, ruthlessly eliminates anyone who knows about his past. To protect his secrets, he arranges the murder of a local and frames Hamlin as the killer. Dumphy, however, spares a saloon singer named Julie and permits her marriage to Conroy.

As Dumphy sends his wife Dolores away upon her discovery of his dark history, she reunites with Hamlin, her former love, and they flee the town together. Meanwhile, Dumphy and Conroy strike a deal to drill for oil on their adjacent lands. While Conroy discovers that the richest oil sites are located on his property and occupied by local prospectors, he initially promises to protect them but later falters under pressure from his wife, who is being blackmailed by Dumphy. Conroy attempts to pull back from the oil venture to safeguard the land of his friends, but Dumphy sends assassins to eliminate him; tragically, they mistakenly kill Conroy's pregnant wife instead. Eventually, Conroy's enterprise is overtaken by the powerful businessman Trott, who reveals he has evidence of Dumphy's crimes and threatens to expose him. Trott's men destroy Dumphy's oil operations, leaving Conroy disillusioned. In the end, he decides to abandon the oil business and return to his roots as a prospector.

== Cast ==
- Donatas Banionis as Gabriel Conroy, a prospector (voiced by Alexander Demyanenko).
- Mircea Veroiu as Jack Gemlin, professional gambler (voiced by Anatoly Kuznetsov)
- Lyudmila Senchina as Julie Prudhomme, the singer of cabaret
- Maria Ploae as Dolores Damphy (voiced by Valentina Talyzina)
- Leonid Bronevoy as Peter Damphy, entrepreneur
- Lev Durov as Lucky Charlie
- Vsevolod Abdulov as Henry York, a young journalist
- Ferenc Bence as Harry, shooter (voiced by Nikolai Grabbe)
- Yan Shanilets as Julian Barreto
- Algimantas Masiulis as Starbottle (voiced by Yuri Sarantsev)
- Gregory Lampe as seller of secrets
- Sergei Martinson as Mr. Trott
- Oleg Zhakov as Judge Flemming
- Talgat Nigmatulin as Joyce

== Soundtrack ==
Vladimir Vysotsky wrote seven texts for the film, three of which were put by the composer Firtich to music and performed by Lyudmila Senchina.
