= A Soldier Came Back from the Front =

- Russian: Пришёл солдат с фронта
- Directed by: Nikolay Gubenko
- Written by: Sergei Antonov; Nikolay Gubenko; Vasiliy Shukshin
- Starring: Mikhail Gluzskiy; Irina Miroshnichenko; Nikolay Gubenko; Elena Prudnikova; Misha Rodyakov
- Cinematography: Elizbar Karavayev
- Edited by: Zoya Veryovkina
- Music by: Vyacheslav Ovchinnikov
- Release date: 1971
- Country: Soviet Union
- Language: Russian

A Soldier Came Back from the Front (Russian: Пришёл солдат с фронта) is a 1971 Soviet war drama film directed by Nikolay Gubenko.

== Plot ==
The film tells about the soldier Nikolay, who returns from the front and learns that his wife is no longer alive. But, despite this, he continues to live and work on.

== Cast ==
- Mikhail Gluzskiy as Ivan Menshikov
- Irina Miroshnichenko as Vera Kurkina
- Nikolay Gubenko as Nikolay Maksimovich Yegorov
- Lena Smirnova as Nadenka Yegorova
- Misha Rodyakov as Leshenka
- O. Larionova
- Ivan Sharin as Yerofeich (as I. Sharin)
- Lyudmila Stoyanova
- Natalya Bondarchuk as Shura (as N. Bondarchuk)
- Alevtina Rumyantseva
