= Regimantas Adomaitis =

Lithuanian film and stage actor (1937–2022)

- Born: 31 January 1937; Šiauliai, Lithuania
- Died: 20 June 2022 (aged 85); Vilnius, Lithuania
- Occupation: Actor
- Years active: 1963–2022

Regimantas Adomaitis (31 January 1937 – 20 June 2022) was a Lithuanian film and stage actor. He was also active in Russia and Germany.

== Career ==
Adomaitis was born in Šiauliai. He graduated from the Faculty of Physics and Mathematics at Vilnius University. He later studied in Vilnius Conservatoire.

In 1985, he was a member of the jury at the 35th Berlin International Film Festival. Adomaitis has received many awards of recognition. In 1988 he with other 34 prominent people created Sąjūdis Reform Movement, which eventually led to the declaration of independence of Lithuania on 11 March 1990.

He lived in Vilnius, the capital of Lithuania, where he worked as an actor at the Lithuanian National Drama Theatre.

== Filmography ==
- Nobody Wanted to Die (1966)
- East Corridor (1966)
- Feelings (1968)
- King Lear (1971)
- That Sweet Word: Liberty! (1973)
- Devil's Bride (1974)
- Centaurs (1978)
- Faktas (1981)
- The Trust That Has Burst (1983)
- You Exist... (1993)
- Moscow Saga (2004)
