= Aleksandr Mikhailov (actor) =

Russian film actor

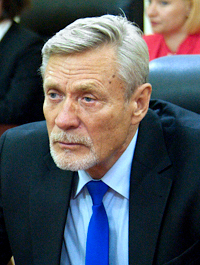
- Aleksandr Mikhailov in 2014
- Born: Aleksandr Yakovlevich Mikhailov; 4 October 1944 (age 81); Olovyannaya, Zabaykalsky Krai, RSFSR, Soviet Union
- Other name: Actor
- Education: Maly Theatre
- Years active: 1973–present

Aleksandr Yakovlevich Mikhailov (Russian: Александр Яковлевич Михайлов; born 4 October 1944) is a Soviet and Russian actor. He has appeared in 42 films since 1973. He starred in the 1981 film Muzhiki! which was entered into the 32nd Berlin International Film Festival, where it won an Honourable Mention.

People's Artist of the RSFSR (1992). People's Artist of the Pridnestrovian Moldavian Republic (2014).

== Social position ==
On 12 February 2015, Ukraine's Security Service banned Mikhailov from entering Ukraine for five years for public supporting the Luhansk People's Republic and the Donetsk People's Republic and a visit to the territory under the control of the rebels.

== Selected filmography ==
Aleksandr Mikhailov has starred in over 81 films.

- Muzhiki! (1981) as Pavel
- Per Aspera Ad Astra (1981) as Dreier
- Carnival (1981) as Remizov
- Plead Guilty (1983) as Voronin
- Offered for Singles (1983) as Victor P. Frolov, commander
- Snake Catcher (1985) as Pavel Sergeevich Shorokhov
- Love and Doves (1985) as Vasily Kuzyakin
- Bless the Woman (2003) as Yurlov
- Yesenin (2005) as Alexander Khlystov
- Mata Hari (TV Mini-Series 2016) as Semikhin
