= Plead Guilty =

- Russian: Признать виновным
- Directed by: Igor Voznesensky
- Written by: Yuri Ivanov; Vladimir Karasyov
- Starring: Aleksandr Mikhailov; Vladimir Shevelkov; Igor Rogachyov; Aleksandr Silin; Marina Yakovleva
- Cinematography: Anatoly Buravchikov
- Edited by: Galina Dmitriyeva
- Music by: Aleksandr Zhurbin
- Release date: 1983
- Running time: 80 minute
- Country: Soviet Union
- Language: Russian

Plead Guilty (Russian: Признать виновным, romanized: Priznat vinovnym) is a 1983 Soviet crime drama film directed by Igor Voznesensky.

== Plot ==
The film tells about the criminal investigator Sergey Voronin, who is literally in love with his work. He organized a club of young friends of the police, in which they play sports and communicate, but he is worried about the guys who fell under the influence of high school student Nikolai Boyko, who is engaged in robbery. His mother is too busy with journalism to change her son. Teachers can't do anything about it either. And suddenly Nikolai wounded a girl with a knife. The story deals with themes such as violence and the generation gap. It is one of several works at this time that presented soviet ideals, and as such was part of the propaganda, while also expressing some critique and exposing problems in the society.

== Cast ==
- Aleksandr Mikhailov as Voronin
- Vladimir Shevelkov as Nikolai Boiko
- Igor Rogachyov as Viktor Vladimirov
- Aleksandr Silin as Slava Goriaev
- Marina Yakovleva as Yulia Safonova
- Vera Sotnikova as Olga
- Irina Miroshnichenko as Viktoria Pavlovna, Kolya's Mother (as I.Miroshnichenko)
- Valentin Pechnikov as Saikin
- Vladimir Koretsky as Aleksandr Boiko
- Lyubov Sokolova as Vladimirov's grandmother (as L.Sokolova)
