= Feelings (1968 film) =

- Directed by: Algirdas Dausa; Almantas Grikevičius
- Starring: Regimantas Adomaitis; Juozas Budraitis
- Release date: 28 December 1968
- Running time: 91 minutes
- Country: Soviet Union
- Languages: Russian, Lithuanian

Feelings (Russian: Чувства, lit. 'Feelings', Lithuanian: Jausmai) is a 1968 Soviet historical drama film directed by Algirdas Dausa and Almantas Grikevičius.

== Plot ==
The film is set in 1944, as World War II nears its end. Kasparas, a fisherman, returns to his village, now liberated by the Red Army. During the Nazi occupation, Kasparas did not join the resistance or fight against the fascists, but he also avoided collaboration. Grieving the loss of his wife and seeking to escape both his sorrow and the trauma of war, Kasparas arrives with his two children at the home of his brother, Andrius. Complicating matters, Andrius's wife harbors feelings for Kasparas.

Kasparas soon learns that Andrius collaborated with the Nazis and that their home is being used to shelter enemies of the Soviet regime. Despite this revelation, Kasparas chooses to remain uninvolved. However, the situation escalates when the leader of the group, composed of Lithuanian nationalists, requests Kasparas’s help in smuggling them across the bay to Nazi-occupied Sweden. Kasparas refuses.

His refusal leads to violent coercion, as the group tries to force him to aid their escape. Despite the threats and physical abuse, Kasparas stands firm, unwilling to betray his principles or leave his homeland. In the end, he refuses to flee, choosing instead to stay behind and face whatever consequences await.

== Cast ==
- Regimantas Adomaitis - Kasparas
- Juozas Budraitis - Andrius
- Regina Paliukaitytė - Agne
- Bronius Babkauskas - Policeman Vaitkiavicius
- Eugenija Bajorytė - Morta / Iane
- Algimantas Masiulis - German Soldier Ferdinand
- Laimonas Noreika - Philologist
- Vytautas Paukštė - Teacher
- Kazimieras Valaitis - Vytautas, Iane's Husband
- Gediminas Karka - Police Commander
