= Užuperkasis =

- Village
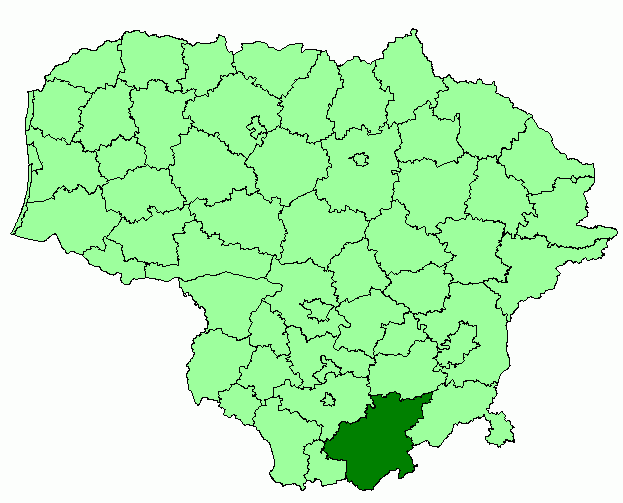
- Location in Varėna district municipality Location of Varėna district in Lithuania
- Coordinates: 54°21′N 24°51′E
- Country: Lithuania
- County: Alytus County
- Municipality: Varėna District Municipality
- Eldership: Valkininkai eldership

Population (2011 Census)
  - Total: 343
- Time zone: UTC+2 (EET)
  - Summer (DST): UTC+3 (EEST)

Užuperkasis is a village in Valkininkai eldership, Varėna District Municipality, Alytus County, southeastern Lithuania. According to the 2001 census, the village has a population of 359 people. At the 2011 census, the population was 343.
