= Almantas Grikevičius =

Lithuanian film director (1935–2011)

- Born: 7 June 1935; Kaunas, Lithuania
- Died: 4 April 2011 (aged 75)
- Resting place: Antakalnis Cemetery, Vilnius
- Occupations: Film director, screenwriter
- Spouse: Rita Liaudanskaitė-Grikevičienė

Steponas Almantas Grikevičius (June 7, 1935 – April 4, 2011) was a Lithuanian documentary and feature film director and screenwriter.

== Biography ==
In 1965, he graduated from the Directing Faculty of the VGIK (All-Union State Institute of Cinematography). From 1969 to 1992, he worked at the Lithuanian Film Studio. Grikevičius’s film "Jausmai" ("Feelings") is recognized as the best Lithuanian film of all time. He was buried in Antakalnis Cemetery.

== Filmography ==
- Saulės pasakos (1964; documentary; director, screenwriter)
- Tavo rankose (1965; documentary; director, screenwriter)
- Trys raktai (1966; documentary; director, screenwriter)
- Laikas eina per miestą (1966; documentary; director, screenwriter)
- Sušaudymas (1967; documentary; director)
- Jausmai (1968; director, with Algirdas Dausa)
- Ave, Vita (1969; director)
- Temperatūra ne pagal Celsijų (1973; director, screenwriter)
- Sadūto tūto (1974; director)
- Sodybų tuštėjimo metas (1976; director)
- Veidas taikinyje (1979; TV film, 2 episodes, director)
- Faktas (1980; director)
- Jo žmonos išpažintis (1984; director)
- Vilkolakio pėdsakai (1986; director, actor)
- Išėjusiems negrįžti (1988; screenwriter)
- Malda už Lietuvą (1991; director, screenwriter)
- Nusišypsok mums, Viešpatie (1993; screenwriter)
- Elzė iš Gilijos (1999; editor)
- Pastabos gyvenimo būdo paraštėse (2002; director, screenwriter)
- Bandymas išsiaiškinti (2003; director, screenwriter)

== Awards ==
- 1981: Honored Art Worker of the Lithuanian SSR
- 1984: Lithuanian SSR State Prize
- 2004: Lithuanian Government Prize for Art
- 2005: Cross of the Knight of the Order for Merits to Lithuania
- 2009: National Culture and Art Prize
