= Juozas Miltinis =

Lithuanian theatre director

Juozas Miltinis (September 3, 1907 in Akmenė, Lithuania – July 13, 1994 in Panevėžys, Lithuania) was a Lithuanian theatre director, actor and founder of the Juozas Miltinis Drama Theatre in Panevėžys. Miltinis has brought up a number of actors.

== Biography ==
From 1932 on, Miltinis studied in Paris, in the school of theatrical art conducted by Charles Dullin. After his return to Kaunas, Miltinis organized here his own theatrical studio and propagated the main tenets of his teachers, Charles Dullin and Jacques Copeau. In 1937-38 he studied in London.

The Panevėžys Drama Theatre was founded in 1940 and Miltinis was appointed as its chief art director. The main body of the young theatre was made up from the pupils of this studio.

February 15, 1954 he was dismissed from the Theatre directors position for ideological reasons, and returned to the position only in 1959. Miltinis began to implement his ideas that he brought from Paris. New concept of theatre and the hero of the play was applied. Militnis retired in 1980.

== Legacy ==
In his theatre Miltinis raised many famous Lithuanian actors. Most notable of them are Donatas Banionis, Vaclovas Blėdis, Gediminas Karka, Stepas Kosmauskas, Eugenija Šulgaitė, Kazimieras Vitkus, Regina Zdanavičiūtė.

Panevėžys County library preserves the bibliographic heritage of Juozas Miltinis. On October 8, 2007, a memorial statue of Juozas Miltinis was unveiled on the central square of Panevežys.
