= Donatas Banionis =

Soviet and Lithuanian actor (1924–2014)

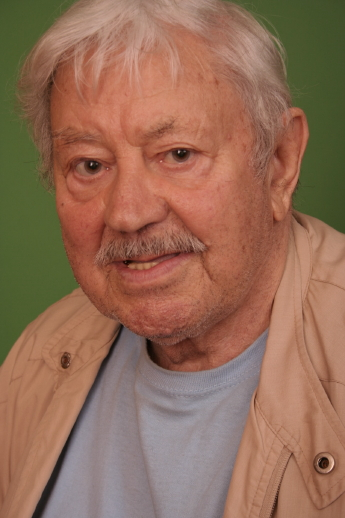
- Banionis in 2008
- Born: Donatas Banionis; 28 April 1924; Kaunas, Lithuania
- Died: 4 September 2014 (aged 90); Vilnius, Lithuania
- Occupations: Actor; theatre director; movie actor
- Years active: 1944–2013

Donatas Banionis (28 April 1924 – 4 September 2014) was a Soviet and Lithuanian stage and film actor and theatre director. He has more than 80 credited roles in cinema and is best known for his performance in the lead role of Tarkovsky's Solaris as Kris Kelvin. He was born in Kaunas, Lithuania.

Banionis began his career with some films in Lithuanian, but he would later play mainly in Russian language films (although his voice was dubbed by Russian actors). He has also worked outside the USSR like in the title role Francisco Goya of the USSR-GDR coproduction Goya or the Hard Way to Enlightenment (1971), directed by Konrad Wolf and in the title role as Ludwig van Beethoven in the 1976 DEFA-production Beethoven - Tage aus einem Leben. Aside from films, he was a popular stage actor in Panevėžys, where he acted since the age of 17, and which was frequented by Donatas' fans from all over the former Soviet Union. His first teacher was Juozas Miltinis. He acted in Vilnius, in the Lithuanian National Drama Theatre. One of the best-known works of the actor was the role of Kris Kelvin in the film Solaris (1972) of Andrei Tarkovsky.

Vladimir Putin once stated that Banionis' part in the 1968 Soviet spy film Dead Season was the reason why he joined the KGB.

== Early life and education ==
Donatas Banionis was born on 28 April 1924 in Kaunas, Lithuania, to a family of labourers. His father was Juozas Banionis and his mother Ona Blažaitytė Banionienė.

He graduated from the First Kaunas Handicraft School, specialising in ceramics. During his studies he participated in a drama club.

In 1940 in Kaunas, based on the amateur collective that existed at the House of Labor, a professional theatre was created, which was headed by the young director Juozas Miltinis, and soon the theatre moved to Panevėžys. In 1941 Donatas Banionis was admitted to the troupe.

In 1944, Banionis graduated from the studio at the Panevėžys Theater, becoming a professional actor.

In 1984 he graduated from the State Conservatory of the Lithuanian SSR (now the Lithuanian Academy of Music and Theater).

== Career ==
=== Theatre ===
On the stage, Banionis played over 100 characters. He acted in many plays, including "The Inspector General" by Nikolai Gogol (1945); Liar by Carlo Goldoni (1952); How the Steel Was Tempered, based on the novel by Nikolai Ostrovsky (1952); Hedda Gabler by Henrik Ibsen (1957), There, Behind the Door, based on the work of Wolfgang Borchert (1966); and The Chair, by Valery Vrublevskaya (1980).

In the early 1980s, after the retirement of Juozas Miltinis, Banionis was appointed the chief director of the Panevėžys Theater, assuming, in addition to problems of a creative nature, the entire burden of purely economic problems: preparation for tours, replenishment of the troupe. Banionis led the theatre until the year 1988. The performances staged during this time included "Amadeus", "Three sacks of weeds" and "Evening".

In the 1990s, the actor performed in the plays "Mindaugas" by Justinas Marcinkevičius (1994), "On the Golden Lake" by Ernest Thompson (1996), "The Circle" by Somerset Maugham (1996), "Love Letters" by Albert Garni (1997)

=== Film ===
In 1947, Banionis appeared in the film Marytė. However, his cinematic debut is considered to be the film Adam wants to be a Man (1959) by director Vytautas Žalakevičius, then Banionis starred in his picture The Chronicle of One Day (1964).

Banionis' fame came after the film by Žalakevičius Nobody Wanted to Die (1965). The actor's work in the film by Savva Kulish Dead Season (1968) earned him great popularity.

Banionis starred in the films Nobody Wanted to Die (1965), The Little Prince (1966), Operation Trust (1967), King Lear (1970), Goya or the Hard Way to Enlightenment (1971), The Life and Death of Ferdinand Luce (1976), Beethoven — Days of a Life (1976), Armed and Dangerous (1976), Commander of the Lucky "Pike" (1972), The Flight of Mr. McKinley (1975), Centaurs (1978), Niccolo Paganini (1982), Zmielov (1985), Living Target (1990), Without Evidence (1992), Anna (1996) Yard (1999), Tadas Blinda, The Beginning (2011), etc.

One of the best-known works of the actor was the role of Kris Kelvin in the film of Andrei Tarkovsky Solaris (1972).

== Other activities ==
Banionis was a member of the Jurgis Baltrušaitis Foundation, whose goal is to promote cultural ties and expand humanitarian cooperation between Lithuania and Russia.

Member of the CPSU since 1960. Member of the Communist Party of Lithuania. Member of the Supreme Soviet of the Soviet Union of the 9th convocation (1974–1979).

He is the author of memoir prose "I've wanted to Act since My Childhood" (2006).

== Later life and death ==
In his later years, the actor suffered from heart problems. He was fitted with a cardiac pacemaker then he underwent a long rehabilitation course.

Banionis died on 4 September 2014 from a stroke. He was 90 years old.

== Honors and awards ==
Banionis is a People's Artist of the USSR (1974), winner of the All-Union Film Festival in the category "Best Actor Award" (1966), laureate of the State Prizes of the USSR (1967, 1977, for participation in the films Nobody Wanted to Die and The Flight of Mr. McKinley).

His awards include the Order of Gediminas III degree (1994), the medal. Khanzhonkov in the nomination "For outstanding contribution to the cinema" (1999), the Russian Friendship Orders (1999) and Honor (2009), the Grand Commander's Cross of the Order of Merit for Lithuania (2004), the National Award of Lithuania in the field of culture and art (2013).

He won several prizes at international film festivals. At the film festival of the CIS and Baltic countries Kinoshok in 1999 he was awarded with a special prize "Lady luck" named after Pavel Luspekaev, "for courage and outstanding merits in creativity."

In 1999 he became an Honorary Citizen of the city of Panevėžys.

== Personal life ==
His wife was actress Ona Banionis (1924–2008). They had two sons - Egidijus (1948–1993), a historian, posthumously awarded the State Prize in the field of science, and Raimundas (born in 1957), director.

== Selected filmography ==
- Marytė (1947) as Peter
- Adam Wants To Be a Man (1959) as Mr. Dausa
- A Day's Chronicle (1963) as Donatas
- Mars, mars! Tra-ta-ta! (1964) as major Varnalesa
- Nobody Wanted to Die (1966) as Pirmininkas
- Beware of the Car (1966) as pastor
- The Little Prince (1966) as Adult
- Dead Season (1968) as Ladeinikov
- The Red Tent (1969) as Adalberto Mariano
- King Lear (1971) as Duke of Albany
- Goya or the Hard Way to Enlightenment (1971) as Goya
- Solaris (1972) as Kris Kelvin
- Kapteinis Dzeks (1972) as Mitya
- Commander of the Lucky "Pike" (1973) as Viktor Sherknis
- The Flight of Mr. McKinley (1975) as Mr. McKinley
- Beethoven, Tage aus einem Leben (1976) as Ludwig van Beethoven
- Mama, I'm Alive (1977) as Major Mauris
- Armed and Dangerous (1977) as Gabriel Conroy
- Where were you, Odysseus? (1978, TV Mini-Series) as Soviet intelligence officer Odyssey
- Centaurs (1978) as Salvador Allende, chilský prezident
- Bag of the Collector (1979) as Alexei Tulyakov
- Nesėtų rugių žydėjimas (1979) as Antanas Petrusonis
- Territory (1979) as Ilya Chinkov
- The Suicide Club, or the Adventures of a Titled Person (1981, TV Movie) as Nick Nichols, The Chairman
- Andrius (1980) as Rauplenas
- Faktas (1981) as Colonel Titel
- Medaus menuo Amerikoje (1981) as Alan
- Atsiprasau (1982) as Guest from Vilnius
- Snake Catcher (1985) as Boris
- The Dolphin's Cry (1986) as Submarine Chaplain
- The 13th Apostle (1988) as Otets
- Entrance to the Labyrinth (1990, TV Mini-Series) as Mazardi
- Kiemas (1999) as the old man
- Anastasia (2006, TV Movie) as father
- Attack on Leningrad (2009) as Toyvo (uncredited)
- Tadas Blinda. Start (2011) as Mikhail Muravyov (final film role)
