= Algimantas Masiulis =

Lithuanian film and theatre actor

- Born: July 10, 1931; Surdegis, Anykščiai District Municipality, Lithuania
- Died: August 19, 2008 (aged 77); Kaunas, Lithuania
- Occupation: actor

Algimantas Masiulis (July 10, 1931 Surdegis, Anykščiai District Municipality — August 19, 2008, Kaunas, Lithuania) was a Lithuanian film and theatre actor.

== Biography ==
Masiulis appeared in his first play in the autumn of 1948, in Schoolgirl, where he played the role of a gym student. The play was directed by his teacher, Juozas Miltinis. Over the course of his career, Masiulis portrayed over 90 characters. Masiulis appeared in Lithuanian, Russian and Soviet productions.

He performed at the Panevezys Drama Theatre for many years before joining the Kaunas State Drama Theatre in 1978. Masiulis also devoted more time to his drawings and art during the latter part of his life.

Masiulis was awarded the 3rd Class Order of the Lithuanian Grand Duke Gediminas in 1998 for his work in cinema and theater.

== Death ==
Algimantas Masiulis died on August 19, 2008, at the age of 77 in the city of Kaunas, Lithuania.

== Selected filmography ==
=== Film ===
- Adam Wants to Be a Man (1959)
- Nobody Wanted to Die (1966)
- The Shield and the Sword (1968)
- Treasure Island (1971)
- Herkus Mantas (1972)
- Diamonds for the Dictatorship of the Proletariat (1975)
- The Autumn of My Childhood (1977)
- Destiny (1977)
- Armed and Dangerous (1977)
- American Tragedy (1981)
- Faktas (1981)
- Express on Fire (1981)
- Flight Over Atlantic Ocean (1982)
- Kai aš buvau partizanas (2008)
- Nazis and Blondes (2008), documentary, playing self

=== Television ===
- Entrance to the Labyrinth (1989)
- Criminal Stories (1995–1996)
- Kamenskaya (1999)
