= List of Lithuanian films =

A list of films produced in Lithuania. For an A-Z list see Category:Lithuanian films

== Russian Empire ==
Title	Director	Cast	Genre	Notes
1909
Над Неманом/On the River Neman	Vladislav Starevich			
Жизнь стрекоз/The Life of the Dragonfly	Vladislav Starevich			
Жуки-скарабеи	Vladislav Starevich			
1910
Lucanus Cervus	Vladislav Starevich			
Прекрасная Люканида/The Beautiful Lukanida	Vladislav Starevich			

== Republic of Lithuania 1918-1940 ==
Title	Director	Cast	Genre	Notes
1927
Rūpestingas tėvas			Commercial	
1928
Kareivis – Lietuvos gynėjas	Jurgis Linartas			
1931
Jonukas ir Onutė	Jurgis Linartas, Vladas Sipaitis	Vanda Lietuvaitytė, Vladas Sipaitis, Potencija Pinkauskaitė, Antanas Mackevičius, Stasys Petraitis	Comedy	
1938
Storulio sapnas	Stasys Ušinskas			The first Lithuanian sound film

== Lithuanian SSR ==
=== 1945-1989 ===
Title	Director	Cast	Genre	Notes
1947
Marytė	Vera Stroyeva	Tatyana Lenikova, Juozas Laucius, Lilijana Binkytė, Bronius Kisielius, Juozas Siparis, Laimonas Noreika, Donatas Banionis	Drama	Shot at Mosfilm Studios, Moscow
1956
Ignotas grįžo namo	Aleksandr Razumny	Agimantas Masiulis, Bronius Babkauskas, Balys Bratkauskas		
1957
Žydrasis horizontas	Vytautas Mikalauskas	Vytautas Buizys, Eustachijus Aukštikalnis, Napoleonas Bernotas, Bronė Kurmytė, Grąžina Balandytė, Juozas Jaruševičius	Children's film	
1959
Adomas nori būti žmogumi	Vytautas Žalakevičius	Vytautas Puodžiukaitis, Audronė Bajerčiūtė, Juozas Miltinis, Donatas Banionis, Bronius Babkauskas, Algimantas Masiulis		
1963
Vienos Dienos Kronika	Vytautas Žalakevičius	Algimantas Masiulis, Regimantas Adomaitis, Donatas Banionis, Regina Vosyliūtė, Vytautas Tomkus, Bronius Babkauskas, Eugenija Šulgaitė	Drama	
1964
Paskutinė atostogų diena/The Girl and the Echo	Arūnas Žebriūnas	Lina Braknytė		Locarno International Film Festival special prize (1965)
1966
Nobody Wanted to Die (Niekas nenorėjo mirti)	Vytautas Žalakevičius	Donatas Banionis, Kazimiras Vitkus, Eugenija Šulgaitė, Regimantas Adomaitis, Algimantas Masiulis, Juozas Budraitis, Laimonas Noreika		
1968
Jausmai	Almantas Grikevičius, Algirdas Dausa	Regimantas Adomaitis, Juozas Budraitis, Bronius Babkauskas, Algimantas Masiulis, Gediminas Karka, Vytautas Paukštė, Gediminas Girdvainis, Aurelija Mikušauskaitė		Special Jury prize at San Remo International Film Festival (1975). Also voted as the best Lithuanian film ever in 1997 survey of film critics
1971
Maža išpažintis	Algirdas Araminas	Gediminas Karka, Rūta Staliliūnaitė, Vytautas Kernagis, Vaiva Mainelytė, Juozas Budraitis, Gediminas Girdvainis, Algimantas Masiulis		
1972
Herkus Mantas	Marijonas Giedrys	Antanas Šurna, Eugenija Pleškytė, Algimantas Masiulis, Stasys Petronaitis, Gediminas Karka, Pranas Piaulokas, Aleksandras Vokačius, Vytautas Paukštė		
Tas saldus žodis - laisvė!	Vytautas Žalakevičius	Regimantas Adomaitis, Irina Miroshnichenko		
1974
Velnio nuotaka	Arūnas Žebriūnas	Vaiva Mainelytė, Regimantas Adomaitis, Gediminas Girdvainis, Regina Varnaitė, Bronius Babkauskas		
1975
Atpildo diena/The Day or Retribution	Stasys Motiejūnas, Algimantas Puipa			
1976
Sodybų tuštėjimo metas	Almantas Grikevičius			
Virto ąžuolai	Gytis Lukšas			
1977
Riešutų duona	Arūnas Žebriūnas			
1981
Arkliavagio duktė	Algimantas Puipa	Nijolė Oželytė, Liubomiras Laucevičius, Mindaugas Capas, Vytautas Paukštė		
1983
Skrydis per Atlantą	Raimondas Vabalas	Remigijus Sabulis, Eimuntas Nekrošius		
Moteris ir keturi jos vyrai	Algimantas Puipa	Jūratė Onaitytė, Antanas Šurna, Vidas Petkevičius, Saulius Balandis, Povilas Gaidys, Kostas Smoriginas, Vytautas Paukštė		Awards: Kiev Film Festival awards for best scenography and best female actress (1984)
1984
Mano mažytė žmona	Raimundas Banionis	Eleonora Koriznaitė, Saulius Balandis, Ingeborga Dapkūnaitė		
1986
Elektroninė senelė	Algimantas Puipa	Vidas Petkevičius		
Kažkas atsitiko	Artūras Pozdniakovas	Vytautas Kernagis, Foje, Antis, Galina Dauguvietytė, Olegas Ditkovskis		
1989
Baltijos kelias	Arūnas Matelis		Documentary	
Pelesos milžinai	Arūnas Matelis		Documentary	

== Lithuanian diaspora abroad ==
Title	Director	Cast	Genre	Notes
1969
Walden	Jonas Mekas		Avant-garde	
1972
Reminiscences of a Journey to Lithuania	Jonas Mekas		Avant-garde	
1975
Lost, Lost, Lost	Jonas Mekas		Avant-garde	

== Republic of Lithuania 1990-current ==
=== 1990s ===
Title	Director	Cast	Genre	Notes
1990
1991
1992
Atostogos				
Zefiro Torna	Jonas Mekas		Avant-garde	
1993
1994
Avtobus				
1995
Anna				
1996
Behind the Threshold				
Few of Us	Šarūnas Bartas			Screened at the 1996 Cannes Film Festival
1997
The House	Šarūnas Bartas			Screened at the 1997 Cannes Film Festival
1998
1999

=== 2000s ===
Title	Director	Cast	Genre	Notes
2000
Elzė iš Gilijos (Elze's Life)	Algimantas Puipa			
Skrydis per Lietuvą arba 510 sekundžių tylos	Arūnas Matelis, Audrius Stonys		Documentary	On July 1, 2003 the film was declared first Lithuanian film to reach platinum status (more than 10000 DVD and VHS copies sold) in Lithuania
2001
2002
2003
Utterly Alone (Vienui vieni)	Jonas Vaitkus			
2004
Buss				With Latvia and Estonia
Baltos dėmės mėlyname				
2005
Before Flying Back to the Earth	Arūnas Matelis		Documentary	Best Lithuanian Film 2005
Forest of the Gods (Dievų miškas)	Algimantas Puipa			
Vilniaus getas	Audrius Juzėnas			
2006
Aš esi tu/You am I	Kristijonas Vildžiūnas			Screened at the 2006 Cannes Film Festival
Diringas	Ignas Miškinis			
Zero	Emilis Vėlyvis			
Jesus from Lithuania	Karolis Jankus			
2007
Nuodėmės užkalbėjimas/Witch and Rain	Algimantas Puipa	Rasa Samuolytė, Nelė Savičenko, Kostas Smoriginas, Aleksas Kazanavičius, Remigijus Sabulis, Romualdas Ramanauskas		Awards: Grand Prix and the Best Production Awards at 2007 Kinoshock film festival, Anapa, Russia
Varnų ežeras/The Lake of Crows	Inesa Kurklietytė			Awards: Olympia Film Festival Award for Best Directing; LUCAS 2007 Festival (Germany), The F.I.C.C. Laudable Mention
2008
Nereikalingi žmonės/Loss	Maris Martinsons	Valda Bičkutė, Kostas Smoriginas, Andrius Mamontovas, Daiva Tamošiūnaitė-Budrė		Awards: Golden Goblet awards for Best Director and Best Music at 2008 Shanghai International Film Festival
Ispanų kalba suaugusiems/Spanish for adults	Tomas Tamosaitis		Documentary	Awards: Grand Prix at the 10th International Film Festival 'Crossroads of Europe' in Lublin (Poland), First Prize at the Documentary Film Festival 'Tranzyt 2009' in Poznan (Poland)
Balkonas/The Balcony	Giedrė Beinoriūtė	Rolandas Kazlas, Elzbieta Degutytė, Karolis Savickis, Saulė Rašimaitė, Dovilė Tarvydaitė, Viktorija Kuodytė, Irmantas Bačelis		
Perpetuum mobile	Valdas Navasaitis	Dainius Gavenonis, Julija Goyd, Jonas Vaitkus, Ramūnas Cicėnas, Viktorija Kuodytė		
5 dienų avantiūra/5 Day scam	Žeraldas Povilaitis	Arvydas Dapšys, Judita Urnikytė, Dominykas Vaitekūnas, Donatas Šimukauskas, Kristina Žaldokaitė		
Kai aš buvau partizanas/When I Was a Partisan	Vytautas V. Landsbergis	Algimantas Masiulis, Gediminas Storpirštis, Marius Jampolskis, Birutė Mar, Rūta Staliliūnaitė		Best Story Award at Blue November MicroFilmFest 2008, Seattle, United States
Kolekcionierė/The Collectress	Kristina Buožytė	Gabija Ryškuvienė, Marius Jampolskis		
Pilotas/The Pilot	Saulius Vosylius	Darius Petkevičius, Antanas Šurna, Albinas Keleris, Lina Budzeikaitė, Vytautas Tomkus		
Vabzdžių dresuotojas/The Bug Trainer	Rasa Miškinytė	Gediminas Girdvainis	Documentary	
2009
Artimos sviesos	Ignas Miskinis		Road Movie	
Šokis dykumoje	Agnė Marcinkevičiūtė		Documentary	
Išpažintis	Oksana Buraja		Short	
Duburys	Gytis Lukšas	Giedrius Kiela, Oksana Borbat, Yevgeniya Varenitsa, Jevgenijus Jefremovas, Darius Meskauskas, Diana Aneviciute, Jurate Onaityte, Arvydas Lebeliunas etc.	Drama	Nominated at Cairo International Film Festival and Nika Awards. Represented Lithuania at Academy Awards 2009

=== 2010s ===
Title	Director	Cast	Genre	Notes
2010
Back to Your Arms	Kristijonas Vildžiūnas		Drama	
2011
Ramin	Audrius Stonys		Documentary	
2012
Conversations on Serious Topics	Giedrė Beinoriūtė			
Vanishing Waves	Kristina Buožytė, Bruno Samper			
2014
Redirected	Emilis Vėlyvis	Vinnie Jones, Scot Williams, Gil Darnell, Oliver Jackson, Anthony Strachan	Crime, action, comedy	
2015
The Summer of Sangailė	Alantė Kavaitė			
Peace to Us in Our Dreams	Šarūnas Bartas			
2016
Seneca's Day	Kristijonas Vildziunas			
2017
Wonderful Losers: A Different World	Arūnas Matelis			

== 2020s ==
Title	Director	Cast	Genre	Notes
2020
The Jump	Giedrė Žickytė		Documentary	
2022
Vesper	Kristina Buožytė, Bruno Samper			
2024
The Southern Chronicles	Ignas Miškinis	Džiugas Grinys, Robertas Petraitis, Digna Kulionytė, Irena Sikorskytė, Rasa Samuolytė, Vaidile Juozaityte, Dovile Silkaityte, Algirdas Dainavicius, Neringa Varnelyte, Dainius Gavenonis, Vaidotas Martinaitis, Julius Zalakevicius, Sarunas Rapolas Meliesius	Coming-of-age, Comedy-drama	Winner - Best Baltic Film at the 28th Tallinn Black Nights Film Festival
Toxic	Saulė Bliuvaitė	Vesta Matulytė, Ieva Rupeikaitė	Drama	Golden Leopard at the 77th Locarno Film Festival
2025
Sandbag Dam	Čejen Černić Čanak	Lav Novosel, Andrija Žunac, Leon Grgić, Franka Mikolaci, Tanja Smoje	Drama	Generation 14plus section at the 75th Berlin International Film Festival
