= Sidabrinė gervė 2008 =

Lithuanian film awards ceremony

- Date: 29 May 2008
- Location: Lithuanian National Drama Theatre, Vilnius
- Country: Lithuania
- Hosted by: Nelė Savičenko, Vladas Bagdonas

Television/radio coverage
- Network: LNK

Sidabrinė gervė 2008 was 1st film award ceremony of Sidabrinė gervė (Silver Crane). The ceremony was held in Vilnius on 29 May 2008.

== Commission ==
In commission which selected winners were 11 members.

- Regimantas Adomaitis
- Arūnas Matelis
- Živilė Pipinytė
- Algirdas Martinaitis
- Romualdas Federavičius
- Skirmantas Valiulis
- Algirdas Selenis
- Gražina Baikštytė
- Artūras Jevdokimovas
- Greta Zabukaitė
- Gražina Arlickaitė

== Winners and nominees ==
=== Best film ===
- Kolekcionierė (by Kristina Buožytė)
- Nuodėmės užkalbėjimas (by Algimantas Puipa)
- Nereikalingi žmonės (by Maris Martinsons)

=== Best short film ===
- Nerutina (by Jūratė Samulionytė)
- Perlas (by Laimantas Kairys)
- Mano tėvas (by Marius Ivaškevičius)

=== Best documentary film ===
- Gyvenimo senelis ir bobutė (by Giedrė Beinoriūtė)
- Varpas (by Audrius Stonys)
- Ispanų suaugusiems (by Tomas Tamošaitis)

=== Best animated film ===
- Edeno sodai (by Nijolė Valadkevičiūtė)
- Margučių rytas (by Jūratė Leikaitė)

=== Best TV film ===
- Nekviesta meilė (by Alvydas Šlepikas)
- XX am. slaptieji archyvai (by Gražina Sviderskytė)
- Garbės kuopa (by Raimundas Banionis)

=== Best operator ===
- Audrius Kemežys ("Varpas“, "Kai aš buvau partizanas“, "Perlas“, "Arklio metai“)
- Algimantas Mikutėnas ("Nuodėmės užkalbėjimas“, "Kad mano namai būtų pilni“, "Šokanti ant stogų“)
- Gints Berzinš ("Nereikalingi žmonės")

=== Best cinematographer ===
- Nijolė Valadkevičiūtė (“Edeno sodai”)
- Galius Kličius (“Nuodėmės užkalbėjimas”)
- Paulius Arlauskas (“Kolekcionierė”)

=== Best scenario ===
- Marius Ivaškevičius (“Mano tėvas”)
- Kristina Buožytė, Darius Gylys, Bruno Samper (“Kolekcionierė”)
- Alvydas Šlepikas ("Nekviesta meilė")

=== Best director ===
- Audrius Stonys
- Kristina Buožytė
- Algimantas Puipa

=== Best supporting actor female ===
- Rūta Staliliūnaitė ("Kai aš buvau partizanas")
- Dalia Michelevičiūtė ("Nereikalingi žmonės")
- Valda Bičkutė ("Nereikalingi žmonės“,"Tikrovės pinklėse“, "Kolekcionierė“)

=== Best supporting actor male ===
- Jonas Vaitkus ("Perlas")
- Andrius Mamontovas ("Nereikalingi žmonės")
- Remigijus Sabulis ("Nuodėmės užkalbėjimas")

=== Best male actor ===
- Kostas Smoriginas ("Nereikalingi žmonės“"Nuodėmės užkalbėjimas“"Anastasija“)
- Marius Jampolskis ("Kolekcionierė“,"Kai aš buvau partizanas“,"Moterys meluoja geriau“)
- Remigijus Vilkaitis ("Mano tėvas“)

=== Best female actor ===
- Rasa Samuolytė ("Nuodėmės užkalbėjimas")
- Nelė Savičenko ("Nuodėmės užkalbėjimas")
- Gabija Ryškuvienė ("Kolekcionierė“, “Nereikalingi žmonės”)

=== Best soundtrack ===
- Kolekcionierė (Julius Zubavičius)
- Varpas (Viktoras Juzonis)
- Nereikalingi žmonės (Jonas Maksvytis, Artūras Pugačiauskas, Andrius Mamontovas, Vytautas Žekonis)

=== Special award ===
"Auksinė gervė" (golden crane) of merits for Lithuanian cinema:

- Donatas Banionis (actor)
- Marijonas Giedrys (director)
- Jonas Gircius (operator)
