= Inga Jankauskaitė =

Lithuanian actress, singer, piano player

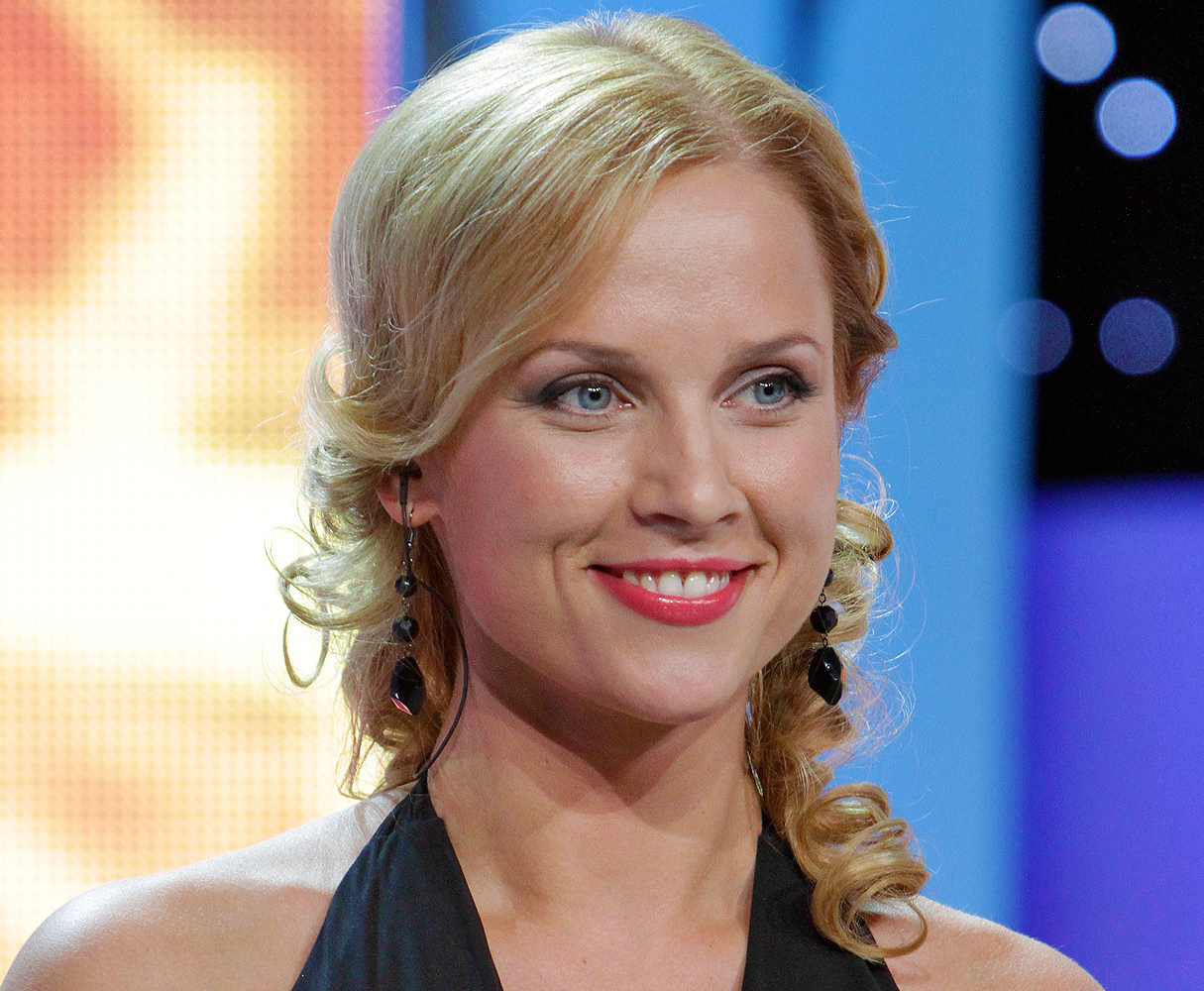
- Jankauskaitė in 2010

Background information
- Born: 10 January 1981 (age 45); Kaunas, Lithuania
- Genres: Pop, R&B, Adult Contemporary
- Occupations: Actress; singer; piano player

Inga Jankauskaitė (born 10 January 1981) is a Lithuanian actress, singer, and piano player.

== Career ==
Jankauskaitė was as a radio DJ at radio stations Kauno fonas and Ultra vires. After graduation from the Juozas Naujalis Music Academy in 1997, she studied at the Lithuanian Academy of Music and Theatre from 1999 to 2002 and 2004 to 2005.

She was a member of music group L+. In 2007, she participated in TV reality show Žvaigždžių duetai and won the second place with her partner Česlovas Gabalis. In a satirical news show Dviračio šou she plays a "blond girl". Presently Jankauskaitė is also a coach on TV show The Voice of Lithuania and presenter on TV show Žvaigždžių duetai (Star Duos).

== Roles of note ==
Theatre

- 2001 – Berta in King Kongo dukterys by Theresie Walser, Naujosios dramos akcija
- 2004 – Marija Stiuart in Marija Stiuart by Friedrich von Schiller, Lithuanian National Drama Theatre
- 2005 – Liza in Demonai. Nelabieji. Apsėstieji. Kipšai. by Fyodor Dostoyevsky, Lithuanian National Drama Theatre
- 2006 – Rožė in Mažasis princas by Antoine de Saint-Exupéry, Lithuanian National Drama Theatre
- 2007 – Juliet in Meilė ir mirtis Veronoje
- 2008 – Odrė in Vilnius - Dakaras

Cinema

- 2004 – Pušelė in Vienui vieni
- 2010 – in Zero2 (nominated for Sidabrinė gervė)
- 2013 – Kaip pavogti žmoną
- 2017 – Zero3
- 2017 – Trys Milijonai
- 2019 – Ir visi jų vyrai

TV

- 2007–2008 – Mėta in Nekviesta meilė
- 2017–2018 - Lietuvos Balsas Judge/Coach
- 2019 - Lietuvos balsas. Senjorai Judge/Coach
