= Adolfas Večerskis =

Lithuanian actor (born 1949)

- Born: 4 September 1949 (age 76); Kretinga, Lithuanian SSR
- Occupations: Actor, General director of Lithuanian National Drama Theatre
- Years active: 1973–present

Adolfas Večerskis (born 4 September 1949 in Kretinga), is a Lithuanian movie and stage actor, director, and translator. He began his career in films, but later chose to play mainly on the stage. Večerskis, his wife Viola, and their younger daughter Juta live in Vilnius, where he is the General Director of the Lithuanian National Drama Theatre. He is a judge on the show Lithuania's Got Talent.

== Studies ==
Večerskis studied at the Lithuanian State Conservatory. He completed actor studies in 1973 and manager studies for theatre director in 1988. In 1993 Večerskis studied art management at the Art Institute of New York City. In 1996 he received a management certificate from the Baltic Management Fund.

== Career ==
- 1973–1991 – performed various roles at the Lithuanian National Drama Theatre
- 1992 – opened Vaidilos ainiai, his own private theatre (in 1997 renamed as A. Večerskis Theatre)
- 1995–2000 – manager of an international project theatre without borders
- 1998 – manager of Kretinga Theatre Festival
- 1998 – appointed as the Program Chief of the Lithuanian National Drama Theatre

== Important plays ==
- 1994 – Gyvenimo miražas
- 1996 – Paskutinė meilės naktis at Vaidilos ainiai, based on a play by Miguel Delibes
- 1997 – Aukščiausioji terapija at A. Večerskis Theatre, based on Beyond Therapy by Christopher Durang
- 1998 – Bill Manhof Neatidarykite durų po vidurnakčio at A. Večerskis Theatre
- 2002 – Bamba, based on Le Nombril by Jean Anouilh
- 2003 – Grobis, based on Loot by Joe Orton
- 2005 – Meilė pagal grafiką, based on Run for Your Wife by Ray Cooney

== Television ==
- 2007–2009: Nekviesta meilė as Antanas Baronas
