= List of 2020 box office number-one films in Lithuania =

This is a list of films which have placed number one at the weekend box office in Lithuania during 2020.

== Number-one films ==
†	This implies the highest-grossing movie of the year.

#	Date	Film	Gross	Notes	Ref(s)
1	January 5, 2020	Tobulas pasimatymas †	$275,060		
2	January 12, 2020	Tobulas pasimatymas †	$172,977		
3	January 19, 2020	Tobulas pasimatymas †	$91,197		
4	January 26, 2020	1917	$58,830		
5	February 2, 2020	Importinis jaunikis	$233,965		
6	February 9, 2020	Importinis jaunikis	$121,177		
7	February 16, 2020	Importinis jaunikis	$112,798		
8	February 23, 2020	The Call of the Wild	$49,455		
9	March 1, 2020	Peggy Sue Got Married	$46,477		
10	March 8, 2020	Onward	$54,751		
11–22	March 15, 2021 – May 31, 2021	Lithuanian cinemas closed and box office reporting suspended due to the COVID-19 pandemic			
23	June 7, 2020	Onward	$603		
24	June 14, 2020	Pets United	$859		
25	June 21, 2020	Parasite	$509		
26	June 28, 2020	Nova Lituania	$8,520		
27	July 5, 2020	Sonic the Hedgehog	$9,443		
28	July 12, 2020	Sonic the Hedgehog	$10,072		
29	July 19, 2020	A Piece of Cake	$5,661		
30	July 26, 2020	No Escape	$13,139		
31	August 2, 2020	Unhinged	$14,807		
32	August 9, 2020	My Spy	$4,649		
33	August 16, 2020	Greenland	$31,810		
34	August 23, 2020	Greenland	$28,392		
35	August 30, 2020	Tenet	$127,230		
46–52	November 15, 2021 – December 31, 2021	Lithuanian cinemas closed and box office reporting suspended due to the COVID-19 pandemic			

== See also ==
- List of Lithuanian films — Lithuanian films by year
