= List of 2023 box office number-one films in Lithuania =

This is a list of films which have placed number one at the weekend box office in Lithuania during 2023.

== Number-one films ==
†	This implies the highest-grossing movie of the year.

No.	Date	Film	Gross	Ref.
1	January 8, 2023	Avatar: The Way of Water †	$266,863	
2	January 15, 2023	Avatar: The Way of Water †	$195,106	
3	January 22, 2023	Avatar: The Way of Water †	$145,387	
4	January 29, 2023	Avatar: The Way of Water †	$98,551	
5	February 5, 2023	Avatar: The Way of Water †	$68,680	
6	February 12, 2023	Avatar: The Way of Water †	$52,403	
7	February 19, 2023	Ant-Man and the Wasp: Quantumania	$72,142	
8	February 26, 2023	Poetas	$37,101	
9	March 5, 2023	Paradas	$55,252	
10	March 12, 2023	Paradas	$49,836	
11	March 19, 2023	Shazam! Fury of the Gods	$22,729	
12	March 26, 2023	John Wick: Chapter 4	$95,677	
13	April 2, 2023	John Wick: Chapter 4	$67,438	
14	April 9, 2023	The Super Mario Bros. Movie	$60,924	
15	April 16, 2023	The Super Mario Bros. Movie	$13,676	
16	April 23, 2023	Kake Make: mano filmas	$65,365	
17	April 30, 2023	Kake Make: mano filmas	$51,877	
18	May 7, 2023	Guardians of the Galaxy Vol. 3	$87,019	
19	May 14, 2023	The Super Mario Bros. Movie	$13,498	
20	May 21, 2023	Fast X	$106,556	
21	May 28, 2023	Fast X	$53,533	
22	June 4, 2023	Spider-Man: Across the Spider-Verse	$64,349	
23	June 11, 2023	Transformers: Rise of the Beasts	$45,912	
24	June 18, 2023	Elemental	$79,689	
25	June 25, 2023	Elemental	$30,859	
26	July 2, 2023	Indiana Jones and the Dial of Destiny	$41,724	
27	July 9, 2023	Insidious: The Red Door	$50,461	
28	July 16, 2023	Mission: Impossible - Dead Reckoning Part One	$45,031	
29	July 23, 2023	Barbie	$242,034	
30	July 30, 2023	Oppenheimer	$162,494	
31	August 6, 2023	Oppenheimer	$108,085	
32	August 13, 2023	Oppenheimer	$59,680	
33	August 20, 2023	Oppenheimer	$36,810	
34	August 27, 2023	Oppenheimer	$26,723	
35	September 3, 2023	Rally Road Racers	$34,738	
36	September 10, 2023	The Nun II	$54,176	
37	September 17, 2023	The Nun II	$42,303	
38	September 24, 2023	Slow	$35,592	
39	October 1, 2023	As Gyvas	$64,565	
40	October 8, 2023	As Gyvas	$51,521	
41	October 15, 2023	Trolls Band Together	$149,134	
42	October 22, 2023	Trolls Band Together	$122,188	
43	October 29, 2023	Five Nights at Freddy's	$170,410	
44	November 5, 2023	Five Nights at Freddy's	$65,941	
45	November 12, 2023	The Marvels	$53,928	
46	November 19, 2023	The Hunger Games: The Ballad of Songbirds & Snakes	$116,486	
47	November 26, 2023	The Hunger Games: The Ballad of Songbirds & Snakes	$62,228	
48	December 3, 2023	Napoleon	$132,160	
49	December 10, 2023	Napoleon	$84,897	
50	December 17, 2023	Wonka	$86,612	
51	December 24, 2023	Wonka	$39,355	
52	December 31, 2023	Milijonieriaus palikimas	$284,589	

== See also ==
- List of Lithuanian films — Lithuanian films by year
- List of 2025 box office number-one films in Lithuania
