= List of 2025 box office number-one films in Lithuania =

This is a list of films which have placed number one at the weekend box office in Lithuania during 2025.

#	Date	Film	weekend Gross	Notes	Ref(s)
1	January 5, 2025	ReEmigrantai 2	$142,337		
2	January 12, 2025	ReEmigrantai 2	$121,757		
3	January 19, 2025	Babygirl	$98,965		
4	January 26, 2025	The Southern Chronicles	$381,232		
5	February 2, 2025	The Southern Chronicles	$427,434		
6	February 9, 2025	The Southern Chronicles	$360,328		
7	February 16, 2025	The Southern Chronicles	$264,858	#2 Legendines legendos. FELICITA #3 Bridget Jones: Mad About the Boy	
8	February 23, 2025	The Southern Chronicles	$198,359		

== Highest-grossing ==
Highest-grossing films of 2025 (In-year release)
Rank	Title	Distributor	Domestic gross
1.	The Southern Chronicles	ACME	$2,431,189
2.	Babygirl	Europos Kinas JSC	$446,163
3.	Paddington in Peru	ACME	$280,740
4.	Nosferatu	Universal Pictures	$235,796
5.	Conclave	ACME	$99,623
6.	Bridget Jones: Mad About the Boy	Universal Pictures	$95,545

== See also ==
- List of Lithuanian films — Lithuanian films by year
- List of 2023 box office number-one films in Lithuania
- 2025 in Lithuania

Preceded by 2023 Box office number-one films	Box office number-one films 2025	Succeeded by 2026 Box office number-one films
