= Devil's Bride (1974 film) =

- Release date: December 1, 1974
- Running time: 78 minutes
- Country: Soviet Union (Lithuanian SSR)
- Languages: Lithuanian, Russian

Devil's Bride (Lithuanian: Velnio nuotaka, Russian: Чёртова Невеста, romanized: Chyortova nevesta) is the first Soviet musical film created in 1974 and based on the novel by Kazys Boruta Baltaragis's Mill). This musical is a joint creation by the director Arūnas Žebriūnas, composer Vyacheslav Ganelin and the scriptwriter, Lithuanian poet Sigitas Geda.

Due to its popularity it is sometimes called a Lithuanian Jesus Christ Superstar rock opera.

== Synopsis ==
The plot of the musical was simplified compared to the original and less tragic.

A devil Pinčiukas (Gediminas Girvainis), evicted from the heaven, lands on the Earth near the mill of Baltaragis (Vasilijus Simčičius). Pinčiukas and Baltaragis conclude a pact: the devil will help the miller in his work and will get him a spectacular wife, Marcelė (Vaiva Mainelytė). In exchange, Baltaragis will let Pinčiukas marry the beautiful daughter he and Marcelė will have. Soon after giving birth to a daughter, Marcelė dies. The daughter, Jurga (played by the same actress interpreting her mother, Vaiva Mainelytė), grows up to become a beautiful woman, and the handsome Girdvainis (Regimantas Adomaitis) falls in love with her. Pinčiukas plays all sort of tricks to separate Jurga from Girdvainis, while Baltaragis regrets his pact with the devil and tries to persuade him to marry instead his not-so-beautiful sister Uršulė (Regina Varnaitė). In the end, the whole village realizes Pinčiukas is a devil and tries to kill him by drowning him in a nearby river, but he is saved by Uršulė, who is secretly in love with him. In the final scene, Jurga is happily riding with Girdvainis, and they pass by Uršulė and Pinčiukas, who also seem happy with their children.

== Cast ==
- Vaiva Mainelytė – Jurga and Marcelė
- Regimantas Adomaitis – Girdvainis; singing by Vytautas Kernagis
- Gediminas Girdvainis – Pinčiukas
- Vasilijus Simčičius – Baltaragis; singing by Viktoras Malinauskas
- Regina Varnaitė – Uršulė
- Bronius Babkauskas horse thief Raupys
- Juozas Meškauskas
- Regina Arbačiauskaitė
- Danutė Krištopaitytė
- Jonas Pakulis – The Almighty

== Reception ==
Velnio nuotaka was one of the most successful and celebrated movies in the Lithuanian cinema of the Soviet era. Critics have noted influences of Russian movies, but have also praised the originality of “the set and camera movement” that made Arūnas Žebriūnas's style somewhat unique. An “historical Lithuanian movie,” it was also influenced by the “devilish” 1970s, as evidenced by “its portrait of a quite licentious Satanic kingdom on earth.”
