= Rimantė Valiukaitė =

Lithuanian actress

Rimantė Valiukaitė (born 5 March 1970) is a Lithuanian actress. She has finished Vilnius 54th High School. During 1988–1992 she studied acting in Lithuania music academy (course director Jonas Vaitkus). In 1990 she started working in Lithuania National Drama Theatre.

== Filmography ==
Year	Title	Role	Notes
2001	Gedimino, 11	Agnė	TV Series
2002	Warrior Angels	Sybil	
2003	Special Forces	Saira	
2004	The Keeper of Time	Woman with a Cooking Pot	
2007	Nekviesta meile	Elvyra Lauzikaite	TV series
2007	42	Olga	TV series
2008	Defiance	Miriam	
2008	Dar paziuresim	Herself	TV series
2009	Jau puiku, tik dar siek tiek	Elvyra	Short film
2013	Name in the Dark	Sarkiene	
2013	Kaip pavogti zmona		
2015	Woman in Grey		Short film
2015	Traukinio apiplesimas, kuri ivykde Saulius ir Paulius		
2016	Patriotai	Liuba Sereikiene	
2016	Gautas Iskvietimas	Motina Rasa Klumbiene	
2016	O, ne! O, taip!	Nijole	
2016	Gautas iskvietimas 3		
2016	Visi vyrai - kiaules	Dzeinara	TV series
2017	Zero 3	Erika-Ryza	
2018	As Zvaigzde		
2023	Slow	Elena's mother	

== Theatre ==
Year	Title	Role	Notes
2017	Trys Seserys	Marija Kulygienė	Director - Yana ROSS

== Awards and nominations ==
Year	Title	Award	Nominated work	Result
2010	Sidabrinė gervė	Best supporting actor female	"Jau puiku, tik dar šiek tiek..."	Nominated
