= Moterys meluoja geriau =

- Genre: Drama, Comedy, Romance
- Created by: Rolandas Skaisgirys
- Based on: Moterys meluoja geriau. I d.; Moterys meluoja geriau. II d.; by Daiva Vaitkevičiūtė
- Written by: Daiva Vaitkevičiūtė & Edvinas Kalėda (seasons 1-10)
- Directed by: Raimundas Banionis (season 1); Sigitas Račkys (seasons 2–6); Balys Latėnas (season 3); Linas Paugis (season 6); Saulius Balandis (season 7); Justinas Krisiūnas (season 8); Mykolas Vildžiūnas & Andrius Žiurauskas (seasons 9–10) Andrius Žiurauskas & Ričardas Vitkaitis (season 11); Ramūnas Rudokas (seasons 12-17); Ričardas Vitkaitis (season 13); Marius Jampolskis (season 14)
- Creative director: Ramūnas Rudokas
- Starring: Inga Norkutė, Edita Užaitė, Jurgita Jurkutė, Jūratė Budriūnaitė, Marius Jampolskis, Ramūnas Rudokas, Agnė Šataitė, Vytautas Šapranauskas, Nerijus Gadliauskas, Džiugas Siaurusaitis, Giedrius Savickas, Vitalija Mockevičiūtė, Goda Petkutė, Justina Nemanytė, Ridas Žirgulis, Ugnė Žirgulė, Arnas Ašmonas
- Opening theme: "Moterys Meluoja Geriau" by Širdelės
- Ending theme: "Moterys Meluoja Geriau" by Širdelės
- Composers: Žilvinas Liulys (seasons 1-17); Žeraldas Povilaitis (season 2); Stano (seasons 4-5); Mindaugas Lapinskis (seasons 6-17)
- Country of origin: Lithuania
- Original language: Lithuanian
- No. of seasons: 17
- No. of episodes: 1315 (Seasons 1–16)

Production
- Producers: Rolandas Skaisgirys (seasons 1-4); Gediminas Duoba (seasons 5-11); Audrius Tumavičius (seasons 11, 13-17); Arūnas Pukelevičius (seasons 12-17); Evaldas Priudokas (seasons 12-15); Deimantė Bubelytė (seasons 15-17)
- Production locations: Vilnius, Palanga, Klaipėda, Šventoji, Jonava, Trakai, Ukmergė, Šilalė, Panevėžys, Kaunas
- Camera setup: Multi-camera
- Running time: 22 minutes
- Production company: Videometra

Original release
- Network: TV3
- Release: 4 February 2008 – present

Moterys meluoja geriau (Women Lie Better) is a Lithuanian TV series produced by TV3. It is the most watched Lithuanian drama of all time. The first season is based on a 2002 novel by Daiva Vaitkevičiūtė and follows four young women and their love interests. In later seasons, the series doesn't concentrate on them as much. The first season was released in 2008 and continued for a total of 17 seasons, starring the lead actors Edita Užaitė, Inga Norkutė, Jūratė Budriūnaitė, Jurgita Jurkutė, Vytautas Šapranauskas, Agnė Šataitė, Ramūnas Rudokas, Marius Jampolskis, Gintarė Latvėnaitė, Nerijus Gadliauskas, Giedrius Savickas, Džiugas Siaurusaitis, Vitalija Mockevičiūtė and supporting re-occurring actors Goda Andriūnaitė, Sigitas Račkys, Darius Meškauskas, Arūnas Storpirštis, Jurijus Smoriginas, Goda Petkutė, Justina Nemanytė, Ridas Žirgulis, Ugnė Žirgulė, Arnas Ašmonas, Ineta Stasiulytė, Tomas Kliukas, Jonas Braškys, Kristina Andrejauskaitė, Aušra Štukytė, Edgar Bechter.

The series premiered on TV3 in Lithuania on February 4, 2008.

Moterys meluoja geriau follows the life of Kristina, a woman whose personal struggles with love and trust drive much of the series’ drama. Her romantic relationships are often complicated, filled with misunderstandings, betrayals, and emotional highs and lows. Alongside her story, the series explores the intertwined lives of her “so-called” best friends Meda and Margarita (Margo / Matrona), whose loyalty and intentions are not always genuine - and her cousin Jolanta, who arrives in the city seeking a fresh start but soon becomes the source of conflict for those around her due to own choices and entanglements adding further tension. The early seasons focus heavily on Kristina’s personal and romantic challenges, exploring her relationships and struggles with trust and loyalty. The show always touches upon her best friends Meda, Margarita, cousin Jolanta and other characters. As the series progresses, Meda’s storylines take on a more prominent role, with later seasons delving deeper into Meda's personal life and character development. Together, these intertwined narratives form the backbone of the show, blending themes of friendship, love, dishonesty, manipulation, betrayal, and personal growth.

== Episodes ==
| Series | Episodes | Originally released | |
| Series | Episodes | First released | Last released |
|---|---|---|---|
| 1 | 78 | 4 February 2008 | 10 July 2008 |
| 2 | 62 | 26 August 2009 | 31 December 2009 |
| 3 | 91 | 25 August 2010 | 4 February 2011 |
| 4 | 89 | 2 September 2011 | 10 February 2012 |
| 5 | 90 | 29 August 2012 | 15 February 2013 |
| 6 | 115 | 22 October 2013 | 23 May 2014 |
| 7 | 77 | 13 January 2015 | 29 May 2015 |
| 8 | 84 | 31 August 2015 | 28 January 2016 |
| 9 | 74 | 29 August 2016 | 5 January 2017 |
| 10 | 84 | 4 September 2017 | 1 February 2018 |
| 11 | 74 | 18 September 2018 | 5 February 2019 |
| 12 | 75 | 11 September 2019 | 29 January 2020 |
| 13 | 84 | 31 August 2020 | 27 January 2021 |
| 14 | 80 | 30 August 2021 | 9 November 2021 |
| 15 | 80 | 5 September 2022 | 30 January 2023 |
| 16 | 80 | 4 September 2023 | 30 January 2024 |
| 17 | 40 | 23 October 2024 | 8 January 2025 |

== Cast and characters ==
- Edita Užaitė as Kristina (seasons 1-4; 6-7)
- Inga Norkutė as Meda (seasons 1-17)
- Jūratė Budriūnaitė-Kamrazer as Margarita (Matrona / Margo) (seasons 1-4; 6-7)
- Jurgita Jurkutė as Jolanta (seasons 1-2)
- Agnė Šataitė as Ugnė (seasons 3–7; 12 and 14-16; recurring seasons 2 and 13)
- Ramūnas Rudokas as Marijus (seasons 1–7; 9–10; 12–17)
- Marius Jampolskis as Donatas (seasons 1–7; 9–10; 12–17)
- Vytautas Šapranauskas as Paulius (seasons 1-4)
- Nerijus Gadliauskas as Robertas “Robertėlis” (seasons 4–7, 9–17; recurring seasons 1–3)
- Gintarė Latvėnaitė as Jūratė (seasons 1-7, 15-17)
- Kristina Andrejauskaitė as Irena (seasons 5–7, 9–17; recurring seasons 2–4)
- Giedrius Savickas as Kovaldas (seasons 1-4)
- Evaldas Jaras as Adamas (season 8, 12–17; recurring season 7 and 10)
- Vitalija Mockevičiūtė as Galina (seasons 5–10, 12–17)
- Džiugas Siaurusaitis as Konstantinas (Kostia / Kostas) (seasons 4-10)
- Goda Petkutė as Laura (seasons 11–14)
- Justina Nemanytė as Solveiga (seasons 12, 14-16)
- Vaida Baranovė as Muzika (seasons 9, 12-15)
- Ridas Žirgulis as Kostas (seasons 13–17, recurring season 12)
- Ugnė Žirgulė as Regina (seasons 13–14, 16, recurring seasons 12, 15)
- Ineta Stasiulytė as Natalija (seasons 14-17, recurring season 13)

== Cast overview ==
For the first 15 seasons, the series used to have opening credits with current main actors, starting with season 16, opening credits are still used for some episodes, but all actors are put at the end credits under "Vaidino" aka "Starring" category.

Key
| Series regular | Series guest | No appearances |

| | 1 | 2 | 3 | 4 | 5 | 6 | 7 | 8 | 9 | 10 | 11 | 12 | 13 | 14 | 15 | 16 |
|---|---|---|---|---|---|---|---|---|---|---|---|---|---|---|---|---|
| Kristina | Edita Užaitė | | | | | Edita Užaitė | | | | | | | | | | |
| Meda | Inga Norkutė | | | | | | | | | | | | | | | |
| Jolanta | Jurgita Jurkutė | | Stand in (Note: character was seen during very first episode of third season, but was played by extra) | | | | | | | | | | | | | |
| Paulius | Vytautas Šapranauskas | | | | | | | | | | | | | | | |
| Margarita | Jūratė Budriūnaitė-Kamrazer | | | | | Jūratė Budriūnaitė-Kamrazer | Jūratė Budriūnaitė-Kamrazer (Note: During seventh season actress was credited in opening credits, but never appeared in that season as she was written off in previous season) | | | | | | | | | |
| Kovaldas | Giedrius Savickas | | | | | | | | | | | | | | | |
| Dalius | Sigitas Račkys | Sigitas Račkys | | | | | | | | Sigitas Račkys | | | | | | |
| Gintaras | Darius Meškauskas | | | | | | | | | Darius Meškauskas | | | | | | |
| Silvestras | Arūnas Storpirštis | | | | | Arūnas Storpirštis | | | Arūnas Storpirštis | | Arūnas Storpirštis | | | | | |
| Marijus | Ramūnas Rudokas | | | | | | | | Ramūnas Rudokas | | | Ramūnas Rudokas | | | | |
| Donatas | Marius Jampolskis | | | | | | | | Marius Jampolskis | | | Marius Jampolskis | | | | |
| Jūratė | Gintarė Latvėnaitė | Gintarė Latvėnaitė | | | | | | | | | | | | | Gintarė Latvėnaitė | |
| Ričardas | | Regimantas Adomaitis | | | | | | | | | | | | | | |
| Ugnė | | Agnė Šataitė | Agnė Šataitė | | | | | | | | | Agnė Šataitė | Agnė Šataitė | Agnė Šataitė | | |
| Gustas | | | Vytautas Anužis | | | | | | | | | | | | | |
| Vaidotas | | | Tomas Kliukas | | | | Tomas Kliukas | | | | | | | | | |
| Robertas | Nerijus Gadliauskas | | | Nerijus Gadliauskas | | | | | Nerijus Gadliauskas | | | | | | | |
| Vidas | Jonas Braškys | | | | Jonas Braškys | | Jonas Braškys | | | | | Jonas Braškys | | | | |
| Irena | | Kristina Andrejauskaitė | | | Kristina Andrejauskaitė | | | | Kristina Andrejauskaitė | | | | | | | |
| Feliksas | | | | Jurijus Smoriginas | Jurijus Smoriginas | | Jurijus Smoriginas | | | | | Jurijus Smoriginas | Jurijus Smoriginas | Jurijus Smoriginas | | Jurijus Smoriginas |
| Vilma | | | | | Vaida Genytė (Note: during first 14 episodes of fifth season, actress was seen during opening credits, however because of schedule complict between her and producers, she never appeared in show and Aušra Štukytė took over Vilmas role) | | | | | | | | | | | |
| Vilma | | | | | Aušra Štukytė | | | | | | | | | | Aušra Štukytė | |
| Emilis | | | | | Vytas Caim | | | | | | | | | | | |
| Kostantinas | | | | Džiugas Siaurusaitis | Džiugas Siaurusaitis | | | | | | | | | | | |
| Galina | | | | Unnamed Actress (Note: In fourth season this character appeared for couple episodes and was played by unnamed actress) | Vitalija Mockevičiūtė (Note: replaced Vaida Genytė in fifth season opening credits starting with episode 15) | Vitalija Mockevičiūtė | | | | | | Vitalija Mockevičiūtė | | | | |
| Česlovas | | | | | | Sakalas Uždavinys | | | | | | | | | Sakalas Uždavinys | Sakalas Uždavinys |
| Vladimiras | | | | | | | Andrius Žiurauskas | | | Andrius Žiurauskas | | Andrius Žiurauskas | | | | |
| Ieva | | | | | | Daiva Rudokaitė | | Daiva Rudokaitė | | | | | | | | |
| Oksana | | | | | | | Lina Rastokaitė | Lina Rastokaitė | | | | | | | | |
| Adamas | | | | | | | Evaldas Jaras | Evaldas Jaras | | Evaldas Jaras | | Evaldas Jaras | | | | |
| Edmundas | | | | | | | Rimantas Bagdzevičius | Rimantas Bagdzevičius | | | | Rimantas Bagdzevičius | | | | |
| Bronius | | | | | | | | Vaidas Jočys | | | | | | | | |
| Deimantė | | | | | | | | Eglė Jackaitė | | | | | | | | |
| Zigis | | | | | | | | Rimvydas Ambrazevičius | | | | | | | | |
| Toma | | | | | | | | Justė Zinkevičiūtė | Justė Zinkevičiūtė | | | | | | | |
| Virga | | | | | | | | | Justina Žiogaitė-Butkienė | Skaistė Anusevičiūtė | | | | | | |
| Modestas | | | | | | | | | Dainius Kazlauskas | | | | | | Dainius Kazlauskas | |
| Jorė | | | | | | | | | Brigita Arsobaitė | | | | | | | |
| Ryčka | | | | | | | | | Rokas Petrauskas | Rokas Petrauskas | | | | | | |
| Simas | | | | | | | | | | Andrius Paulavičius | | | | | | |
| Kęstutis | | | | | | | | | | | Jonas Gricius | | | | | |
| Laura | | | | | | | | | | | Goda Petkutė | | | | | |
| Agota | | | | | | | | | | | Asta Baukutė | | | | | |
| Solveiga | | | | | | | | | | | | Justina Nemanytė | | Justina Nemanytė | | Justina Nemanytė |
| Ieva | | | | | | | | | | | | | Vaida Lisikaitė | | | |
| Kostas | | | | | | | | | | | | Ridas Žirgulis | Ridas Žirgulis | | | |
| Regina | | | | | | | | | | | | Ugnė Žirgulė | Ugnė Žirgulė | | Ugnė Žirgulė | Ugnė Žirgulė |
| Natalija | | | | | | | | | | | | | Ineta Stasiulytė | Ineta Stasiulytė | | |
| Muzika | | | | | | | | | Vaida Baranovė | | | Vaida Baranovė | | | | Agnė Levickaitė |
| Mindaugas | | | | | | | | | | | | Simonas Storpirštis | | | | Simonas Storpirštis |
| Deividas | | | | | | | | | | | | Karolis Kasperavičius | | | | Karolis Kasperavičius |
| Marta | | | | | | | | | | | | | | Aurelija Tamulytė | | Aurelija Tamulytė |
| Žydrūnas | | | | | | | | | | | | | | Gytis Pintulis | | Gytis Pintulis |
| Agnė | | | | | | | | | | | | | | Deimantė Bubelytė | | Deimantė Bubelytė |
| Martyna | | | | | | | | | | | | | | | Akvilė Žirgulytė | Akvilė Žirgulytė |
| Stasikas | | | | | | | | | | | | | | | Ričardas Bartašius | Ričardas Bartašius (Note: added to "Vaidino"(Starring) credits starting with season 16 episode 24) |
| Kristina | | | | | | | | | | | | | | | | Kristina Kazlauskaitė |
| Kunigas Dendis | | | | | | | | | | | | | | | | Šarūnas Datenis |
| Antanas | | | | | | | | | | | | | | | | Antanas Kišūnas |

== Awards and nominations ==
| Year | Award | Category | Recipient(s) | Result | Ref. |
|---|---|---|---|---|---|
| 2008 | Sidabrinė gervė 2008 | Best male actor | Marius Jampolskis | Won | |
