= 59th Directors Guild of America Awards =

- Date: February 3, 2007
- Location: Hyatt Regency Century Plaza, Los Angeles, California
- Country: United States
- Presented by: Directors Guild of America
- Hosted by: Carl Reiner

Highlights
- Best Director Feature Film: The Departed – Martin Scorsese
- Best Director Documentary: Before Flying Back to the Earth – Arūnas Matelis
- Website: https://www.dga.org/Awards/History/2000s/2006.aspx?value=2006

The 59th Directors Guild of America Awards, honoring the outstanding directorial achievements in films, documentary and television in 2006, were presented on February 3, 2007, at the Hyatt Regency Century Plaza. The ceremony was hosted by Carl Reiner. On January 9, 2007, the nominees in the feature film category were announced and on January 10, 2007, the nominations in the television movie category were announced. The nominations for the remaining six television awards were announced on January 11, 2007, and the nominations for directorial achievement in documentaries and commercials were announced on January 16, 2007.

== Winners and nominees ==
=== Film ===
Feature Film

Martin Scorsese – The Departed

- Bill Condon – Dreamgirls
- Jonathan Dayton and Valerie Faris – Little Miss Sunshine
- Stephen Frears – The Queen
- Alejandro González Iñárritu – Babel
Documentaries

Arūnas Matelis – Before Flying Back to Earth

- Amy J. Berg – Deliver Us from Evil
- Michael Glawogger – Workingman's Death
- James Longley – Iraq in Fragments
- Jean-Henri Meunier – Ici Najac, A Vous La Terre

=== Television ===
Drama Series

Jon Cassar – 24 for "Day 5: 7:00 a.m. – 8:00 a.m."

- Peter Horton – Grey's Anatomy for "It's the End of the World" and "As We Know It"
- David Nutter – The Sopranos for "Join the Club"
- Thomas Schlamme – Studio 60 on the Sunset Strip for "Pilot"
- Tim Van Patten – The Sopranos for "Members Only"
Comedy Series

Richard Shepard – Ugly Betty for "Pilot"

- Adam Bernstein – 30 Rock for "Pilot"
- Julian Farino – Entourage for "One Day in the Valley"
- Seith Mann – Grey's Anatomy for "Name of the Game"
- Arlene Sanford – Boston Legal for "Breast in Show"
Miniseries or TV Film

Walter Hill – Broken Trail

- Charles S. Dutton – Sleeper Cell: American Terror
- Randa Haines – The Ron Clark Story
- Peter Markle – Flight 93
- Edward James Olmos – Walkout
Musical Variety

Rob Marshall – Tony Bennett: An American Classic

- Bruce Gowers – American Idol for "Season 5 Finale: Episode #534/535"
- Don Roy King – Saturday Night Live for "Host: Alec Baldwin"
- Chuck O'Neil – The Daily Show with Jon Stewart
- Glenn Weiss – The 60th Annual Tony Awards
Daytime Serials

Jill Mitwell – One Life to Live for "Episode #9779"

- Larry Carpenter – One Life to Live for "Episode #9686"
- Casey Childs – All My Children for "Episode #9297"
- William Ludel – General Hospital for "Episode #11177"
- Scott McKinsey – General Hospital for "Episode #11178"
- Brian Mertes – Guiding Light for "Episode #14905"
- Ellen Wheeler – Guiding Light for "Episode #14832"
Reality Programs

Tony Sacco – Treasure Hunters for "Episode #101"

- Bobbie Birleffi – Texas Ranch House for "The Good, the Bad and the Colonel"
- J. Rupert Thompson – Fear Factor for "Military Fear Factor, Season Finale"
- Bertram van Munster – The Amazing Race for "Episode #1002"
- Tim Warren – Pros vs. Joes for "Episode #101"
Children's Programs

Kenny Ortega – High School Musical

- Joyce Chopra – Molly: An American Girl on the Home Front
- Sean McNamara – The Cutting Edge: Going for the Gold
- Fred Savage – Phil of the Future for "Not So Great Great Great Grandpa"
- Ron Underwood – The Year Without a Santa Claus

=== Commercials ===
Commercials

Dante Ariola – Coca-Cola's "First Taste", Traveler's Insurance's "Snowball", and Johnnie Walker's "Human"

- Bryan Buckley – American Express' "Animal" and Burger King's "Manthem" and "More Mayo"
- David Gray – Tribeca Film Festival's "Transvestite" and "Mugger", Full Tilt Poker's "Jesus Throws", and eBay's "Born"
- Tom Kuntz – Altoids' "Fruit Pants" and Skittles' "Trade", "Beard" and "Leak"
- Joe Pytka – Budweiser's "Clydesdales American Dream", Disney's "Preparation", and WTC Memorial's "Where Were You"

=== Lifetime Achievement in News Direction ===
- George Paul

=== Robert B. Aldrich Service Award ===
- Paris Barclay
- Taylor Hackford

=== Franklin J. Schaffner Achievement Award ===
- Terence Benson

=== Honorary Life Member ===
- Carl Reiner
