= D. Eric Maikranz =

American author

- Born: January 24, 1967 (age 59); Evansville, Indiana, U.S.
- Education: University of Colorado
- Occupation: Author
- Spouse: Desiree Maikranz (m. 2003)
- Writing career
- Language: English
- Genres: Thriller, fantasy, conspiracy
- Notable works: The Reincarnationist Papers, Infinite
- Website: ericmaikranz.com

D. Eric Maikranz (born January 24, 1967) is an American novelist whose debut novel, The Reincarnationist Papers, was adapted into a Paramount Pictures film, Infinite, starring Mark Wahlberg and Chiwetel Ejiofor, and directed by Antoine Fuqua. He is also a software executive and former software programmer.

== Early life and education ==
D. Eric Maikranz was born in Evansville, Indiana, and grew up in rural southern Indiana before moving to west Texas and then New Mexico.

He worked as an industrial welder before attending and graduating from the University of Colorado with a degree in Russian Language and Literature.

== Career before writing ==
He worked in high finance, in high tech, and was a nightclub bouncer and radio talk show host before writing for The Denver Post. He lived in Rome for two years where he worked as a tour guide, authored two Italy guidebooks, and was a correspondent for United Press International.

In 2001, he joined the enterprise business software firm JD Edwards as a programmer. He was later a software director for PeopleSoft, and an executive for Oracle Corporation.

== Writing ==
Maikranz began writing fiction and articles in the late 1990s and continued writing in the early 2000s with two Italian travel guides for publisher Marshall Cavendish. He self-published his debut novel, The Reincarnationist Papers, in 2009 where he notably crowdsourced his readers to act as agents by offering a reward on the front page of his book (10% of any advance) to any reader who could introduce the novel to a Hollywood producer who would adapt the book into a movie, which led to the book series being adapted by Paramount.

The Reincarnationist Papers (Blackstone) won the Colorado Book of the Year in 2021 for Science Fiction and Fantasy.

== Works ==
- Insider’s Rome – Marshall Cavendish
- Insider’s Venice – Marshall Cavendish
- The Reincarnationist Papers – Blackstone Publishing 2020
  - The Cognomina Codex – Blackstone Publishing 2023

== Adaptations ==
- Infinite (from The Reincarnationist Papers) – Paramount Pictures 2021
