= Kaip pavogti žmoną =

- Lithuanian: Kaip pavogti žmoną
- Directed by: Donatas Ulvydas
- Produced by: Žilvinas Naujokas
- Starring: Ramūnas Cicėnas; Rimantė Valiukaitė; Giedrius Savickas; Inga Jankauskaitė
- Release date: 20 December 2013
- Running time: 90 minutes
- Country: Lithuania
- Language: Lithuanian

Kaip pavogti žmoną (English: "How to Steal A Wife") is a 2013 Lithuanian comedy film directed by Donatas Ulvydas.

== Summary ==
What would happen if, just before the New Year's Day, you would lock up a woman and her two men – one, a husband, and the other, an ex–husband? And what if the latter was accused of stealing a large sum of money (the fact that he denies himself)? Is it true that old love never withers, especially when 300 million litas are involved? Four people attempt to resolve the ages–old debate of whether love is stronger than money.
