= Infinite (film) =

2021 film by Antoine Fuqua

- Official release poster
- Directed by: Antoine Fuqua
- Screenplay by: Ian Shorr
- Screen story by: Todd Stein
- Based on: The Reincarnationist Papers by D. Eric Maikranz
- Produced by: Lorenzo di Bonaventura; Mark Vahradian; Mark Huffam; John Zaozirny; Mark Wahlberg; Stephen Levinson
- Starring: Mark Wahlberg; Chiwetel Ejiofor; Sophie Cookson; Jason Mantzoukas; Rupert Friend; Toby Jones; Dylan O'Brien
- Cinematography: Mauro Fiore
- Edited by: Conrad Buff
- Music by: Harry Gregson-Williams
- Production companies: Paramount Pictures; Di Bonaventura Pictures; Closest to the Hole Productions; Leverage Entertainment; New Republic Pictures; Fuqua Films
- Distributed by: Paramount+
- Release date: June 10, 2021
- Running time: 106 minutes
- Country: United States
- Language: English

Infinite is a 2021 American science fiction action film directed by Antoine Fuqua, from a screenplay written by Ian Shorr based on a story by Todd Stein (itself adapted from D. Eric Maikranz's 2009 novel The Reincarnationist Papers). The film stars Mark Wahlberg, Chiwetel Ejiofor, Sophie Cookson, Jason Mantzoukas, Rupert Friend, Toby Jones and Dylan O'Brien.

The film was digitally released on Paramount+ on June 10, 2021, following delays from its original August 2020 theatrical release due to the COVID-19 pandemic. It received negative reviews from critics who criticized the performances and screenplay, with some comparing it unfavorably with other films like The Matrix. The film received three nominations at the Golden Raspberry Awards, including Worst Picture.

== Plot ==
In 1985 Mexico City, Heinrich Treadway tries to escape the authorities and a man named Bathurst. Treadway and his associates, Abel and Leona, speak about "the Egg", which Treadway stole from Bathurst. Treadway tells Abel that if he does not survive, the latter must remember to "look inside". He drives off a bridge, jumping from his car in mid-air and onto a crane 150 feet away. However, Treadway watches helplessly as Bathurst arrives and kills Abel and Leona.

In 2020 New York City, Evan McCauley has schizophrenia. Because of past institutionalization and violent behavior, he cannot get a job. He forges a katana for a local gangster, even though he was never trained as a bladesmith. After the deal goes south, Evan makes his escape but is later arrested. A man at the police station introduces himself as Bathurst, claiming they have known each other for centuries and that Evan is Treadway.

Nora Brightman, Leona's reincarnation, helps Evan escape and explains that a group of 500 individuals, known as the Infinites, can remember all their past lives, divided between two groups: the Believers, including Nora, who want to make the world better, and the Nihilists, including Bathurst, who want to end the world. The Nihilists developed a weapon known as the Egg capable of destroying all life on Earth, although Treadway had stolen and hidden the Egg shortly before dying. Most Infinites remember their past lives around puberty, which is why Evan was diagnosed schizophrenic. Bathurst has trapped 200 Believers in computer chips with his Dethroner weapon, including Abel.

Nora takes Evan to the Hub where he undergoes training and treatment to regain his memories with limited success due to electroshock therapy and a car accident. As the Nihilists raid the Hub, Evan, Nora, Kovic and Trace seek the help of another Infinite, Artisan, who uses a machine to restore Evan's memories with a near-death experience. Evan learns that Treadway had hidden the Egg inside of his own body before committing suicide to protect it. Overhearing this, the Nihilists kill Kovic and Trace and recover Treadway's body with the Egg.

Evan, Nora and Artisan attack Bathurst's Scotland estate, killing his forces, including Bathurst's assassin Shin. As Evan chases Bathurst's plane, a mortally wounded Nora sacrifices herself to destroy the repository of contained Believer souls, including Abel, releasing them to reincarnate. Tapping into Treadway's superhuman abilities, Evan fights Bathurst, surviving the Dethroner thanks to a steel plate in his head. Evan contains Bathurst with the Dethroner and disarms the Egg, sinking into the depths of the ocean with it.

Nora and Abel are reborn and they reunite at the Beginning around fourteen years later. An older Artisan visits a reborn Evan in Jakarta, Indonesia and offers him Treadway's katana. Evan regains his memories upon recognizing Artisan.

== Cast ==
- Mark Wahlberg as Evan McCauley
  - Dylan O'Brien as Heinrich Treadway
- Chiwetel Ejiofor as Ted Bathurst 2020
  - Rupert Friend as Ted Bathurst 1985
- Sophie Cookson as Nora Brightman
  - Joana Ribeiro as Leona
- Jason Mantzoukas as the Artisan
- Jóhannes Haukur Jóhannesson as Kovic
- Liz Carr as Garrick
- Kae Alexander as Trace
- Toby Jones as Bryan Porter
- Tom Hughes as Abel
- Wallis Day as Agent Shin
- Raffiella Chapman as Jinya
- Jack Roth as Ronny
- Leon Annor as Lotto
- Melissa Neal as Shawna

== Production ==
=== Development ===
D. Eric Maikranz self-published The Reincarnationist Papers in 2009. Due to his difficulties finding a literary agent to adapt his book into a film, he announced a campaign in the first edition of the book, offering a commission to anyone who successfully pitched a film adaptation of his book to a Hollywood producer. Within eighteen months, he received an email from Rafi Crohn, a junior executive at a Hollywood production company who found his book in a Nepalese hostel. (Maikranz paid the commission to Crohn in December 2019.) Crohn then commissioned Ian Shorr and Todd Stein to write an adaptation. The screenplay was voted onto the Black List in 2017.

In March 2017, Deadline reported that Paramount Pictures had bought the rights to Shorr and Stein's adaptation, which was described as Wanted meets The Matrix, with Mark Vahradian and Lorenzo di Bonaventura along with John Zaozirny and Crohn set to produce the film. The same Deadline article mistakenly described Shorr and Stein's screenplay as a spec script and Maikranz's book as "unpublished". By November 2018, Paramount began talks with Antoine Fuqua to direct the film. It was announced in February 2019 that Chris Evans had entered negotiations to star in the film, with Fuqua officially confirmed as director. That same month, John Lee Hancock was reported to have provided rewrites on Shorr's script. In June, Evans dropped out of the project due to scheduling conflicts with Defending Jacob, with Mark Wahlberg entering negotiations to replace him. Wahlberg was confirmed in August, with Sophie Cookson and Dylan O'Brien added to the cast. In September, Chiwetel Ejiofor, Jóhannes Haukur Jóhannesson, Rupert Friend and Jason Mantzoukas were cast. Tom Hughes was cast in October.

=== Production ===
Filming began in September 2019. Scenes were shot in central Cardiff, Farnborough Airport and an indoor ski facility, The Snow Centre, during a week long shutdown to the public. Filming was also done at ex-Rothschild stately home Mentmore Towers in Buckinghamshire, in London, Mexico City, Guanajuato, Nepal, New York City, Scotland, Cambodia and the Alps.

=== Music ===
Harry Gregson-Williams, who worked with director Antoine Fuqua on his previous films, composed the film score. Paramount Music & La-La Land Records released the soundtrack.

=== Track listing ===
No.	Title	Length
1.	"The End of All Things"	1:49
2.	"The Blacksmith"	1:24
3.	"The Last Life"	2:38
4.	"Interrogation"	3:14
5.	"Resurrection"	1:51
6.	"The Samurai Sword"	2:38
7.	"Hold Tight"	4:40
8.	"10,000 Hours"	3:12
9.	"It's Not My Memories"	4:07
10.	"Enemy Territory"	1:47
11.	"Never Enough"	2:41
12.	"The Hub"	2:40
13.	"Roll the Plane"	3:14
14.	"Cain and Abel"	4:41
15.	"Meet at the Beginning"	3:40
Total length:		44:16

== Release ==
Infinite was originally scheduled for a theatrical release on August 7, 2020, but was delayed to May 28, 2021, due to the COVID-19 pandemic. It was delayed again to September 24, 2021, when A Quiet Place Part II was moved to the May slot. On May 6, 2021, Paramount cancelled Infinite's theatrical release, and instead digitally released it via Paramount+ on June 10, 2021. In countries where Paramount+ isn't available as a streaming service, the film was released through ViacomCBS-owned SVOD services Paramount Play and Paramount+ on August 23, 2021. The film was released on Blu-ray and DVD on May 17, 2022, by Paramount Home Entertainment.

== Reception ==
=== Critical response ===
On the review aggregator website Rotten Tomatoes, 17% of 83 critics' reviews are positive, with an average rating of 4.1/10. The website's consensus reads: "An initially intriguing sci-fi thriller that quickly veers into incoherence, Infinite is as inane as it is inconsequential." Metacritic, which uses a weighted average, assigned the film a score of 28 out of 100, based on 27 critics, indicating "generally unfavorable" reviews.

Ty Burr of The Boston Globe gave the film 1.5/4 stars and wrote: "Heading straight to streaming platform Paramount+ without the embarrassment of appearing in theaters first, the movie is both blissfully incoherent and weirdly generic, as if it had been assembled from the spare parts of other movies and glued together with stuntwork." From The Hollywood Reporter, David Rooney said: "Infinite is a soulless grind. Juiced up with a succession of CG-enhanced accelerated chases and fight action interspersed with numbing bursts of high-concept geek speak, Antoine Fuqua's sci-fi thriller isn't helped by a lead performance from Mark Wahlberg at his most inexpressive."

In his review for Variety, Peter Debruge called the film "Matrix-meets-The Old Guard wannabe" and wrote: "The more you start to nitpick this movie, the more innumerable its plot holes appear, until the whole thing collapses in on itself." Justin Chang of the Los Angeles Times said: "The script doesn't reincarnate so much as it recycles, drawing freely on the nested realities of Inception, the free-your-mind metaphysics of The Matrix and the amnesiac-assassin revelations of the Jason Bourne movies. Maybe watch one of those tonight instead." Robert Daniels of RogerEbert.com gave the film 0.5/4 stars, saying that "rather than crafting a high-concept science-fiction marvel, Fuqua's Infinite relies on shoddy VFX and ropey world-building for the worst film of his career."

The New York Times listed the film as one of the "Worst Films of 2021".

=== Accolades ===
Year	Award	Category	Recipient(s)	Result	Ref.
2022	Golden Raspberry Awards	Worst Picture	Lorenzo di Bonaventura, Mark Huffam, Stephen Levinson, Mark Vahradian, Mark Wahlberg and John Zaozirny	Nominated	
2022	Golden Raspberry Awards	Worst Actor	Mark Wahlberg	Nominated	
2022	Golden Raspberry Awards	Worst Supporting Actress	Sophie Cookson	Nominated	
