= Baltaragis's Mill =

1945 fantasy novel by Kazys Boruta

Baltaragis's Mill (Lithuanian: Baltaragio malūnas, arba kas dėjosi anuo metu Paudruvės krašte, "Baltaragis's Mill, or What Once Happened in the Paudruvės Land") is a 1945 fantasy novel by Lithuanian writer Kazys Boruta. The story is about a pact of a miller with a devil, which includes a rash promise. It is based on Lithuanian folklore. Unlike most stories of the type, there was no happy end to anybody: the miller and most of main characters suffer or die and even the devil is killed by the pagan god Perkunas. In 1962 a revised version was published.

The story was translated in several languages.

== Plot ==
The plot includes the following rash promise motif.

The closest neighbor of Baltaragis Pinčiukas (Pinčukas), who is in fact the local devil and lives in the swamp, comes to Baltaragis and makes an offer to help Baltragis to marry a beautiful girl Marcelė, demanding in return something for himself that Baltaragis does not have today, but will have when he gets married. Baltragis and Marcelė have a beautiful daughter Jurga. Some time later Marcelė dies. Pinčiukas comes to demand his bounty: to marry Jurga. Baltragis deceives Pinčiukas: instead of Jurga he gives him Uršulė, his long-time demonstratively pious and superstitious servant, but Uršulė eventually manages to avoid this. Still, after this event, she is nicknamed "the devil's bride". Uršulė, taking revenge, tells the worst things about Baltaragis and his daughter Jurga in the village. After some time Pinčiukas sees beautiful Jurga and realizes he was deceived. After that he starts chasing off Jurga's suitors, so she cannot get married... There is no happy end to anybody in the end.

== Adaptations ==
In 1973 Vyacheslav Ganelin wrote an opera based on it. The composer called the genre "rhythm-opera", a hint to the term "rock opera", bearing in mind Jesus Christ Superstar. The verse for it was written by the Lithuanian poet Sigitas Geda. In 1974 in Lithuania the first Soviet musical film Devil's Bride was produced which used Ganelin's music and which had become immensely popular. The plot of the musical was simplified compared to the original and less tragic.

In 1979 Vytautas Brazdylis staged a ballet in the Lithuanian SSR State Opera and Ballet Theatre based on Ganelin's rhythm-opera. In 2011 Brazdylis recreated his ballet to a minute detail including decorations, to be performed by the students of the National M. K. Čiurlionis School of Art.
