= Vesper (film) =

2022 film by Kristina Buožytė and Bruno Samper

- Theatrical release poster
- Directed by: Kristina Buožytė; Bruno Samper
- Written by: Kristina Buožytė; Brian Clark; Bruno Samper
- Produced by: Asta Liukaitytė; Daiva Varnaitė Jovaišienė; Alexis Perrin; Kristina Buožytė
- Starring: Raffiella Chapman; Eddie Marsan; Rosy McEwen; Richard Brake; Melanie Gaydos
- Cinematography: Feliksas Abrukauskas
- Edited by: Suzanne Fenn; Justin MacKenzie Peers
- Music by: Dan Levy
- Production companies: Natrix Natrix; Rumble Fish Productions; 10.80 Films
- Distributed by: Condor Entertainments (France)
- Release dates: 2 July 2022 (KVIFF); 17 August 2022 (France)
- Running time: 114 minutes
- Countries: Lithuania; France; Belgium
- Language: English
- Budget: €5 million
- Box office: $1.5 million

Vesper (released in France as Vesper Chronicles) is a 2022 science fiction film directed by Kristina Buožytė and Bruno Samper, starring Raffiella Chapman, Eddie Marsan, Rosy McEwen and Richard Brake. Set in a bleak post-apocalyptic Earth, it follows the eponymous 14-year-old girl skilled in biohacking. It was selected to compete at the 2022 Karlovy Vary International Film Festival.

== Plot ==
Humanity tried to prevent the impending ecological crisis by investing massively in genetic technology. It failed. Engineered viruses and organisms escaped into the wild. They wiped out edible plants, animals and large populations of humans. An oligarchy now thrives in enclosed cities called "citadels", while everyone else struggles to survive.

The people outside of the citadels must find food and resources on their own. For food, people rely on seeds traded by the citadels. These are coded to produce only one harvest and require a special process to be made fertile. Only the scientists of the citadels know the details of this process.

Vesper is a 14-year-old girl who lives in a house in the forest with her paralyzed father, Darius. Darius can only communicate through a drone that looks like a floating robot head. He uses the drone to accompany Vesper in her daily routine while his real body stays in bed. A year ago Vesper's mother left to be part of a group of people called The Pilgrims. They are scavengers and drag the junk they collect. Vesper's father's machine stops working and she has to go to her uncle Jonas for help. Jonas lives not far away. He manages a sort of orphanage that he uses to extract blood from the children and sell it to the citadel. Jonas also owns beings called Jugs, artificial humans made with the sole purpose of being a slave workforce.

One day a citadel ship crashes nearby and Vesper finds a young woman survivor, Camellia. Vesper takes her home and heals her wounds. Camellia promises to take Vesper and her father to the citadel if they can find Elias, the other passenger of the ship. When Vesper goes to check, she finds Jonas there, who kills Elias and suspects that there was another passenger on the ship.

Vesper wants to communicate with the citadel so that they can come and pick up Camellia but the only transmitter in the area is with Jonas. When Vesper reveals to Camellia that Elias is dead, the woman mourns him deeply. Vesper realizes that Camellia isn't human — she is a very advanced Jug created by Elias that looks exactly like a human and has emotions. Making a sapient Jug is a crime so Elias and Camellia needed to escape.

Vesper uses seeds stolen from her uncle Jonas' farm for an experiment involving samples from the synthetic Camellia. Camellia plays a tune from a musical instrument that causes the "locked" bacteria in the seeds to unlock. Vesper assumes she found a way to "unlock" the citadel seeds and make them fertile so they will never starve again.

Jonas comes to the house and Vesper and Camellia manage to overpower him. Vesper makes a deal: if he leaves them alone he can have the seeds and enough food. Jonas goes back to his place and calls the citadel, revealing to them Camellia's location. Soldiers from the citadel arrive and kill Jonas before going to Vesper's house.

Camellia and Vesper run while Darius stays behind and holds off the soldiers by blowing up the house's generator. Vesper runs toward the house but Camellia stops her, reminding her that she has the seeds and can change the world. After they successfully fight off two of the soldiers, Camellia sedates Vesper and surrenders herself to a soldier.

When Vesper wakes up, she returns to her burnt down house and buries some of the altered seeds. Four of Jonas' kids find her and Vesper decides to let them join her as she travels south. Vesper and the children see a Pilgrim and follow them to a makeshift tower built by Pilgrims. Vesper climbs to the top to see her surroundings. She first looks toward the citadels flying over scorched earth, then turns to face the expansive forest. She takes the remaining seeds and lets the wind spread them.

== Cast ==
- Raffiella Chapman as Vesper, a 14-year-old girl living alone with her father; she demonstrates great aptitude at bio-hacking and tries to help Camellia after rescuing her.
- Eddie Marsan as Jonas, Vesper's uncle, who is the brutal leader of a nearby group of survivors.
- Rosy McEwen as Camellia, a citadel citizen whose ship crashed in the forest before being rescued by Vesper.
- Richard Brake as Darius, Vesper's father and Jonas' brother, paralyzed but always following her via a talking drone.
- Melanie Gaydos as Jug, a genetically created human being devoid of intelligence, used as slave labor in Jonas' camp.
- Edmund Dehn as Elias, Camellia's father, who is head scientist at the nearest citadel.
- Matvej Buravkov as Boz
- Marijus Demiskis as Med
- Markas Eimontas as Mo
- Titas Rukas as Beck
- Markas Sagaitis as Fitz

== Production ==
The film was six years in the making for directors/writers Kristina Buožytė and Bruno Samper, who had already collaborated on Vanishing Waves in 2012. They chose to shoot it in English to broaden its appeal.

It was shot in Vilnius, Lithuania, mostly outdoors except the scenes inside Vesper's house, which were shot in a studio. Location scouting in Lithuania proved difficult, as there was two meters of snow, so the crew had to imagine how locations would look once the snow had melted. It was still snowing two weeks before the beginning of the shoot, and at that point, no location had been confirmed, so they decided on locations during shooting.

Cinematographer Feliksas Abrukauskas was inspired by paintings from Johannes Vermeer and Rembrandt for the light.

While visual effects are present in the film, they are mostly to enhance a shot with a plant or a ship, as no scene was shot against a green screen. Vesper's flying drone is either CGI or a real drone, depending on the shots, as the real drone was very loud and actors could not concentrate on their lines when it was flying.

== Release ==
Vesper debuted at the 2022 Karlovy Vary International Film Festival on 2 July 2022. The film opened in French theatres on 18 August 2022. It was released in the United States, Lithuania and Turkey on 30 September 2022, and in Germany and Singapore on 6 October 2022.

== Reception ==
=== Box office ===
As of October 27, 2022, Vesper has grossed $49,493 in the United States, and $1.5 million in other territories, including $889,529 from France and $414,985 from Russia, for a worldwide total of $1.576 million.

In France, Vesper sold 13,352 tickets on its first day, earning fifth place, for 303 copies, behind Where the Crawdads Sing. During its first week, however, Vesper did not reach the French top 10 but managed to sell 76,366 tickets, for an average of 256 tickets per copy, and went on to sell 36,552 tickets in its second week. After seven weeks, it sold a cumulative 137,533 tickets.

=== Critical response ===
On the review aggregator website Rotten Tomatoes, 90% of 59 critics' reviews are positive, with an average rating of 7.4/10. The website's consensus reads: "More visually impressive than narratively engaging, Vesper rewards patient viewers with immersive world-building and intelligent ideas." On Metacritic, the film has a weighted average score of 70 out of 100, based on 10 critics, indicating "generally favorable reviews".

Olivier Delcroix, writing for Le Figaro, found the film "the result of a string of carefully thought through choices, a very beautiful immersive movie that resembles a strange sci-fi fable, fascinating and otherworldly." Philippe Guedj of Le Point found "influences from Cronenberg, Giger, Jim Henson or even Miyazaki", with "the movie zigzagging between a Grimm fairytale mood and a hyperreal painting of a medieval future."

Ben Croll of TheWrap deemed the film "something wholly unique—at once modern and timeless, nostalgic for a genre only just created, already pining for images freshly cast up on screen." Robert Daniels, writing for RogerEbert.com, remarked that "you'd think someone like Vesper who's experienced so much tragedy and misfortune would carry at least a twinge of bitterness or some flaw", but wrote that "[t]he major draw of Vesper, however, is the imaginative world building by Buozyte and Samper." Guy Lodge of Variety described it as "a sci-fi film fascinated by earthly survival, not sleek, state-of-the-art spectacle—though it often dazzles just the same", and praised "the sophisticated technical realization of this desperate dystopia...achieved on a budget presumably a fraction of that granted to most franchised Hollywood fantasies". Writing for New Scientist, Davide Abbatescianni labelled it an "exquisite dystopian sci-fi" with "a Brothers Grimm edge" as well as "a good example of what European science fiction has to offer."

Screen Rant rated it a 3 stars out of 5. The header summary stated: "Two elements—the design-driven worldbuilding and Vesper's development—keep viewers engaged, but they have to overcome a few weaknesses to do so."

== See also ==
- List of French films of 2022
