= Galius Kličius =

Lithuanian painter and cinematographer (1950–2024)

Galius Kličius (10 May 1950 – 11 September 2024) was a Lithuanian painter, cinematographer, and theatrical designer.

His film art direction credits include productions by BBC Classical Music Television, Showtime Networks, USA Networks, and Company Pictures.

Kličius died on 11 September 2024, at the age of 74.

== Awards and nominations ==
Year	Title	Award	Nominated work	Result
2008	Sidabrinė gervė	Best cinematographer	Nuodėmės užkalbėjimas	Won

== See also ==
- List of Lithuanian artists
