= Raffiella Chapman =

British actress

- Born: 11 October 2007 (age 18); Hastings, East Sussex, England, United Kingdom
- Occupation: Actress

Raffiella Chapman (born 11 October 2007) is a British actress who has starred in many films and TV series, including The Theory of Everything, Miss Peregrine's Home for Peculiar Children, His Dark Materials and Infinite.

Raffiella plays the lead role of Vesper in dystopian sci-fi movie Vesper, released in 2022.

== Life ==
Raffiella Chapman is the daughter of actor Dom Chapman and screenwriter Emilia di Girolamo.

== Filmography ==
=== Film ===
Year	Title	Role	Notes	Ref.
2014	The Theory of Everything	Lucy Hawking		
2016	The Have-Nots	Sara		
2016	Miss Peregrine's Home for Peculiar Children	Claire Densmore		
2017	Homebound	Anna		
2018	Belittled	Sally	Short film	
2021	Infinite	Jinya		
2022	Vesper	Vesper		

=== Television ===
Year	Title	Role	Network	Notes	Ref.
2013	Law & Order: UK	Ellie Tyler	ITV	Episode 7x01	
2018	Trauma	Catherine Bowker	ITV	Episode 1.1, 1.2, 1.3	
2019	His Dark Materials	Annie	BBC 1, HBO		
