= Close to Me (TV series) =

2021 British psychological drama television series

- Based on: Close to Me by Amanda Reynolds
- Written by: Angela Pell
- Directed by: Michael Samuels
- Starring: Connie Nielsen; Christopher Eccleston
- Country of origin: United Kingdom
- Original language: English
- No. of series: 1
- No. of episodes: 6

Production
- Executive producers: Connie Nielsen; Gina Carter
- Producer: Alison Sterling
- Production company: Nordic Entertainment Group

Original release
- Network: Channel 4
- Release: 7 November – 12 December 2021

Close to Me is a British television psychological drama based on the book of the same name by Amanda Reynolds. It stars Connie Nielsen as a Danish translator who loses a year of her memory following a fall. Christopher Eccleston, Susan Lynch, Leanne Best, Rosy McEwen, Tom Taylor, and Ellie Haddington also star. The six-part series commenced on Channel 4 in November 2021, with all episodes made available for streaming concurrently.

== Synopsis ==
Danish language interpreter Jo Harding (Connie Nielsen) suffers head trauma after a fall in her home, causing her to lose her memory of the past year. Harding works to piece her memories together along with her husband Rob (Christopher Eccleston) to understand what happened to her, and in doing so learns that her life was not as perfect as she thought it was.

== Cast ==
- Connie Nielsen as Jo Harding, a woman who loses a year of her memory following brain trauma.
- Christopher Eccleston as Rob Harding, Jo's husband.
- Rosy McEwen as Sash Harding, Jo and Rob's adult daughter.
- Tom Taylor as Finn Harding, Jo and Rob's adult son.
- Susan Lynch as Cathy, Jo's best friend.
- Ellie Haddington as Wendy, Jo and Rob's neighbour.
- Leanne Best as Anna, Rob's colleague.
- Henning Jensen as Frederik, Jo's father.
- Ray Fearon as Nick, Jo's boss.
- Nick Blood as Thomas, Sash's boyfriend.
- Jamie Flatters as Owen
- Lorraine Burroughs as Helen
- Zoe Croft as Ella

== Episodes ==
No.	Title	Directed by	Written by	Original release date	UK viewers (millions)
1	"Episode 1"	Michael Samuels	Angela Pell	7 November 2021	N/A
2	"Episode 2"	Michael Samuels	Angela Pell	7 November 2021	N/A
3	"Episode 3"	Michael Samuels	Angela Pell	7 November 2021	N/A
4	"Episode 4"	Michael Samuels	Angela Pell	7 November 2021	N/A
5	"Episode 5"	Michael Samuels	Angela Pell	7 November 2021	N/A
6	"Episode 6"	Michael Samuels	Angela Pell	7 November 2021	N/A

== Production ==
Close to Me was the first English-language drama produced by Nordic Entertainment Group's British subsidiary, NENT Studios UK. The show was filmed mostly in Hemel Hempstead, Hertfordshire and Hastings. It was filmed during the COVID-19 pandemic in the United Kingdom.
