= Nekviesta meilė =

Lithuanian TV drama series

Nekviesta meilė (English: Uninvited Love) was a Lithuanian TV soap opera series. Its director was Alvydas Šlepikas assisted by Saulius Balandis and Kristina Kunčinaitė. It run for 4 seasons (381 episodes) during 2007–2009 on the LNK TV channel.

Its sequel started in 2010 on TV3 channel under the title Amžini jausmai ("Eternal Feelings"), with the same director. Initially the advertised title was Ir visgi aš myliu ("And Yet I Love").

The series revolves around the family of businessman Andrius Žvinys (Saulius Balandis), son-in-law of a Seimas member, corrupt and powerful man Antanas Baronas (Adolfas Večerskis), and his wife, a pop star Mēta Baronaitė-Žvinienė (Inga Jankauskaitė), which involves love, jealousy, and betrayal, money and power. One may recognize the contemporary realities of Lithuania in the series. As Kauno diena writes, "hundreds of thousands of minutes of love, kisses, tears, hugs. Weddings, funerals, meetings and breakups. Bruises, gunshots, fraud, failed businesses and broken marriages. Runaway brides and uncaught abusers.

It won the Sidabrinė gervė 2008 awards, in best TV film and best film scenario categories.

On the occasion of the opening of the fourth season of the series, a special TV show, a humorous award ceremony "Golden Baubles" was held, at which the "Golden Chickens" (a parody of the "Golden Crane" award) were generously given out to the actors or the characters of the play. For example, Adolfas Večerskis received the Frankenstein Prize "for surpassing Arūnas Valinskas in resurrection" and actress Larisa Kalpokaitė's character Angelina Baronienė received the Phrase of the Year Award (this phrase cannot be quoted).

The sequel was nominated for Sidabrinė gervė 2010 awards in best TV film category.
