= The Reincarnationist Papers =

Novel by D. Eric Maikranz

- North American cover of The Reincarnationist Papers
- Author: D. Eric Maikranz
- Genre: Fantasy, dark fantasy, contemporary fantasy, conspiracy fiction
- Publisher: Self-published; Blackstone Publishing (US reprint)
- Publication date: 2009
- Publication place: United States
- Pages: 415 (U.S. paperback); 423 (UK paperback)
- ISBN: 978-1-09-415494-7 (US)

The Reincarnationist Papers is a novel by D. Eric Maikranz. It has been adapted into the film Infinite, starring Mark Wahlberg and Chiwetel Ejiofor, and directed by Antoine Fuqua.

== Plot ==
Found in Rome twenty years ago, The Reincarnationist Papers follows Evan Michaels, a troubled young man who struggles with having memories from two other lives. Believing that he is the only one in the world burdened with other people's complete memories nearly leads to his self-destruction, until he meets a mysterious woman named Poppy. She understands Evan's struggle because she is exactly like him, only she remembers seven lives. Poppy changes Evan's world forever when she invites him into a centuries-old secret society of 28 others who are like them and he realizes that he is not alone. The Reincarnationists, collectively known as the Cognomina, recall all their past lives and experiences and find one another over and over again in each new incarnation. But to become part of this secretive group, Evan must first prove that he is truly one of them.

== Characters ==
- Evan Michaels – Arsonist
- Bobby Lynn Murray – American boy
- Vasili Blagavich Arda – Bulgarian soldier
- Poppy – Glass artist
- Samas – Art collector
- Diltz – Caretaker of the St. Germain hotel
- Chance – Professional gambler
- Clovis – Lighthouse Keeper
- Ramsay – Professional Soldier
- Henry – Bartender (Evan’s friend)
- Reginald – English prisoner

== Reviews ==
Publishers Weekly wrote:

Maikranz’s spellbinding dark fantasy debut offers a fresh take on the concept of reincarnation.

Oprah Magazine listed The Reincarnationist Papers as a Book to Read Before They're 2021's Most Popular Movies and TV Shows.

For fans of The Matrix and Memento, a twisty, exciting adventure!” Diana Gabaldon, #1 Bestselling author of the Outlander series.

A Library Journal Starred Review wrote:

Epic…thrilling and haunting…Already slated to be a motion picture, this is a fascinating and fast-paced story that will keep readers engaged until the very end.” Library Journal, Reviewed by Ron Samul.

== Release details ==
The Reincarnationist Papers was originally self published in 2009 by D. Eric Maikranz where he notably encouraged his readers to act as agents for him by offering a reward on the front page of his book (10% of any advance) to any reader who could introduce the novel to a Hollywood producer who would adapt the book into a movie. Remarkably, Rafi Crohn, a junior exec at a Hollywood production company found a copy of the book in a hostel in Nepal while travelling and eventually got The Reincarnationist Papers made into the movie Infinite. Maikranz paid the reward to Rafi Crohn in December 2019.

== Adaptation ==
The Reincarnationist Papers has been adapted into the Paramount motion picture Infinite. The adaptation does not resemble the plot of the book.
