= Mission (2026 film) =

British drama film

- Directed by: Paul Wright
- Screenplay by: Paul Wright
- Produced by: Kate Byers; Linn Waite; Alex Thiele; Marie-Elena Dyche; Lowri Roberts
- Starring: George MacKay; Rosy McEwen
- Production companies: BBC Film; BFI; Screen Scotland; Early Day Films; 65 Wilding Films
- Release date: 15 August 2026 (Edinburgh)
- Country: United Kingdom
- Language: English

Mission is an upcoming British film written and directed by Paul Wright and starring George MacKay and Rosy McEwen. The film is scheduled to premiere on 15 August 2026 at the Edinburgh International Film Festival.

== Premise ==
A solitary man embarks on a mission of self discovery through extreme pursuits.

== Cast ==
- George MacKay as Dylan
- Rosy McEwen as Clare
- Hazel Beattie as Jeanie

== Production ==
The film is directed by Paul Wright and has backing from BBC Film, Screen Scotland and Ffilm Cymru Wales with funding from the National Lottery. It is a co-production between Early Day Films and 65 Wilding Films. George Mackay joined the cast in May 2024. It is produced by Kate Byers and Linn Waite for Early Day Films and Alex Thiele for 65 Wilding Films, as well as Marie-Elena Dyche for Meraki Films and Lowri Roberts for Rapt. Rosy McEwen joined the cast in June 2024.

Principal photography took place in Scotland between May and August 2024.
