= Rosy McEwen =

British actress

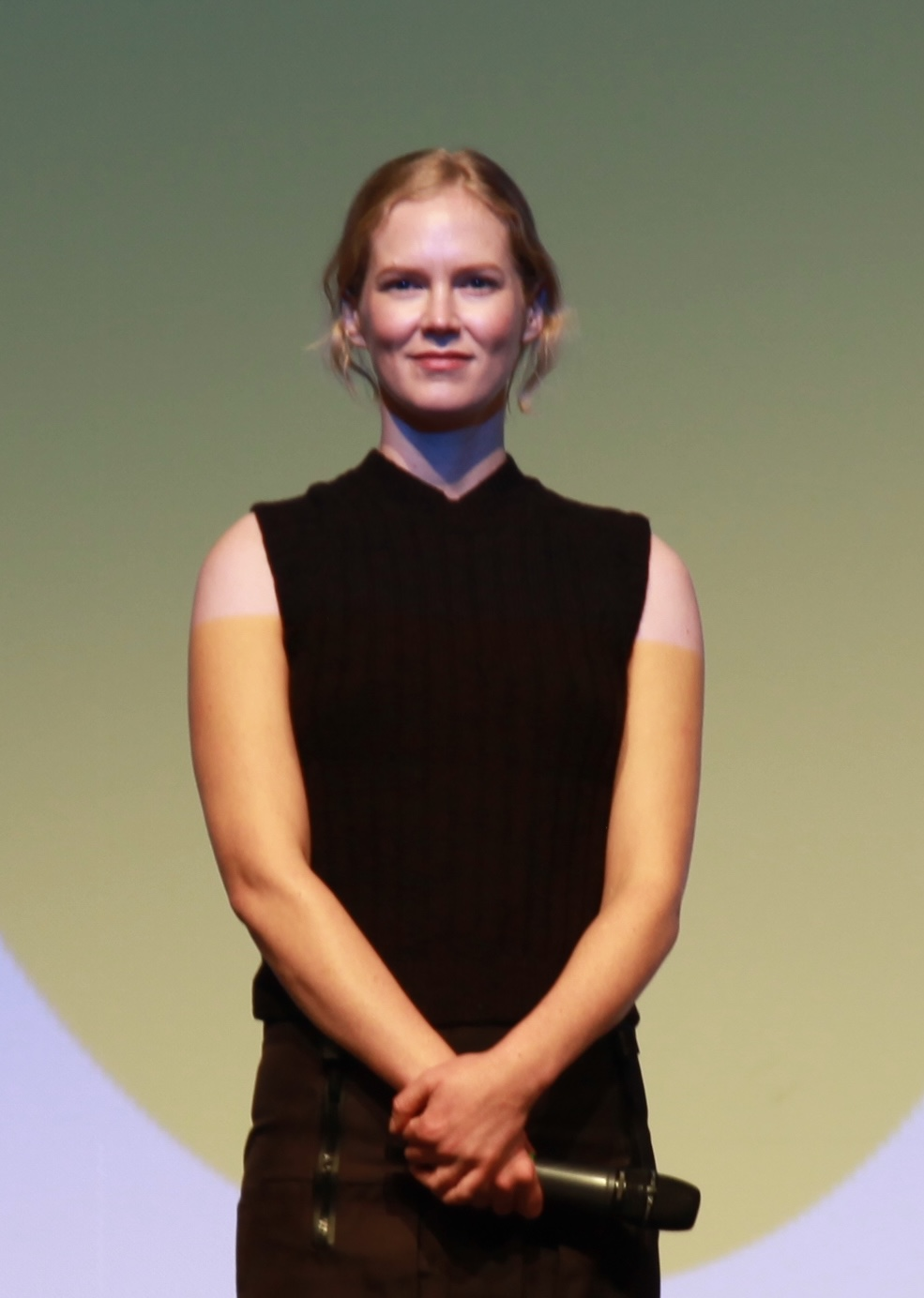
- McEwen in 2025
- Born: 1995 (age 30–31)
- Other name: Rosy Byrne
- Education: University of Leeds; Bristol Old Vic Theatre School
- Occupation: Actress

Rosy McEwen is a British actress. She won a British Independent Film Award for her performance in Blue Jean (2022). On television, she is known for her roles in the TNT series The Alienist (2020), the Channel 4 drama Close to Me (2021) and the Prime Video crime drama Scarpetta (2026). Her other films include Vesper (2022).

== Early life ==
McEwen attended an all-girls Catholic school St Mary's School Ascot. When she was 12, she auditioned for the film adaptation of Atonement and made it to the final two against Saoirse Ronan.

McEwen studied History of Art at the University of Leeds and then trained at the Bristol Old Vic Theatre School. Born with the surname Byrne, she took her mother's maiden name McEwen to avoid confusion with the Australian actress Rose Byrne. McEwen had a role in The Cherry Orchard at the Bristol Old Vic and the Manchester Royal Exchange. She also had early television roles in Cranford and Waking The Dead.

== Career ==
=== Theatre ===
McEwen spent time with the Royal Shakespeare Company and won acclaim for her performances in Timon of Athens and Tamburlaine. McEwen appeared as Desdemona in Clint Dyer's production of Othello at the Royal National Theatre in London, a role The Evening Standard said she “knocked out of the park”.

=== Television and film ===
On screen, she appeared with Luke Evans and Dakota Fanning in the Netflix series The Alienist. She played Christopher Eccleston’s daughter in the Channel 4 miniseries Close to Me and alongside Eddie Marsan in the science fiction film Vesper. She also had a role in the Rosemary’s Baby prequel, Apartment 7A alongside Julia Garner.

McEwen had the lead role in the film Blue Jean released in the United Kingdom in February 2023. Her performance was variously described as a “revelation”, “riveting”, and “excellent”, as well as being “a powerful, internalised performance”. For the portrayal McEwen earned the award for best lead performance at the British Independent Film Awards in December 2022, a category in which McEwen beat Sally Hawkins, Florence Pugh and Bill Nighy. McEwen appears in the Prime Video series Scarpetta as a younger version of the title character, a role she shares with Nicole Kidman.

== Filmography ==
=== Film ===
Year	Title	Role	Notes	Ref.
2022	Vesper	Camellia		
2022	Blue Jean	Jean		
2024	Apartment 7A	Vera Clarke		
2024	The Letter Writer	Elli		
2024	Harvest	Kitty Gosse		
2025	Rabbit Trap	Daphne Davenport		
2026	Mission	Clare	Filming	

=== Television ===
Year	Title	Role	Notes	Ref.
2020	The Alienist	Libby	Main role (season 2)	
2021	Close to Me	Sash	Main role	
2025	Black Mirror	Verity Green	Episode: "Bête Noire"	
2026	Scarpetta	Young Kay Scarpetta		
