= Jurgita Jurkutė =

Lithuanian beauty queen

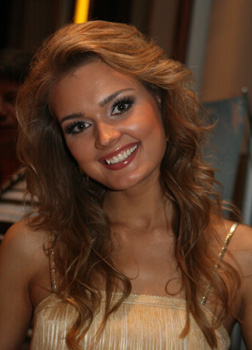
- Jurgita Jurkutė
- Born: Jurgita Jurkutė; April 23, 1985 (age 40); Plungė, Soviet Union (now Lithuania)
- Beauty pageant titleholder
- Title: Miss Lithuania 2007

Jurgita Jurkutė (born April 23, 1985) is a Lithuanian actress and beauty pageant titleholder who is the winner of Miss Lithuania 2007 pageant.

== Biography ==
Jurgita was a student at Vilnius University in the Bachelor of Arts on social work. In 2012, she graduated in bachelor studies at Lithuanian Academy of Music and Theatre in Vilnius. Among her hobbies is football. She also works as a model, and has worked in Japan, Italy, Spain, Greece and Germany.

Jurgita believes that her current Miss Lithuania title is an opportunity for her to help others, especially children without families - "one day with our care they will find their true homes".

Jurgita represented Lithuania in Miss World 2007 contest in Sanya, China.

She landed the lead role in the TV series Moterys meluoja geriau ("Women lie better") in 2008. In 2009-2012 Jurgita Jurkutė hosted TV3 projects „Šok su manimi“ ("Dance with me") and "Chorų karai" ("Choir wars").

In 2014 April 1 during Vilnius International Film Festival she was awarded as Lithuanian actress of the year for the roles in Name in the Dark and Valentinas už 2rų.

== Filmography ==
Year	Film	Role	Notes
2008	Moterys meluoja geriau (TV series)	Jolanta	
2009	Šok su manimi (TV show)	Herself	Host
2010	Chorų karai (TV show)	Herself	Host
2011	I cerchi nell'acqua (TV Mini-series)	Ginevra Della Rocca	
2013	Name in the Dark (Vardas tamsoje)	Atali	
2014	Valentinas už 2rų	TBA	
2014	Pakeliui	Aistė	
2020	Tobulas pasimatymas	Lina	
