= Before Flying Back to Earth =

2005 film

- Directed by: Arūnas Matelis
- Release dates: 10 October 2005 (Lithuania); October 2005 (Germany)
- Running time: 52 minutes
- Countries: Lithuania; Germany
- Language: Lithuanian

Before Flying Back to Earth (originally released in Lithuania as Prieš parskrendant į žemę in 2005) is the first feature-length documentary film by the Lithuanian film director Arūnas Matelis. In a lyrical, yet unsentimental fashion, it shows the lives of children hospitalized with leukemia in Vilnius Pediatric Hospital - the same place where Matelis' daughter had battled and recovered from this disease some time before the start of production. The film is described as "a poetic, unsentimental Lithuanian documentary about the resilience of (the) human spirit". Its laconic style and its formal simplicity have been likened to haiku by some critics. Before Flying Back to the Earth is the most highly acclaimed recent Lithuanian film and is considered one of the best documentary films of 2005 in the world; it has been shown in numerous festivals. The film is in the Lithuanian language.

== Awards ==
Arūnas Matelis was awarded the Best Director award in Documentary Feature category during the Directors Guild of America Awards 2006 night on February 3 in Los Angeles for Before Flying Back to Earth. It has become only the second film from Eastern Europe, since Roman Polanski's The Pianist in 2003, to win an award in the ADG; it is also the only film from the region of Central and Eastern Europe to have been nominated for Best Documentary. The film has won many other awards and nominations, including the following:

- Best Lithuanian Film 2005 by Lithuanian Filmmakers Union
- Silver Wolf in International Documentary Film Festival Amsterdam (IDFA), 2005
- Golden Dove in International Leipzig Festival for Documentary and Animated Film, 2005
- Main Prize in Festival Documenta Madrid, 2005
- "Spirit Award for Documentary" in Brooklyn International Film Festival, 2006
- Grand Prix in Pärnu International Film Festival, 2006
- Special Jury Mention in Silverdocs Festival, 2006
- Veliki pečat international competition award in ZagrebDox Film Festival, 2006

The film was nominated for the European Film Academy Best Documentary Award of 2005 and was submitted for the 79th Academy Award for Best Foreign Film in 2006.
