= Jonas Vaitkus =

Lithuanian theatre and film director

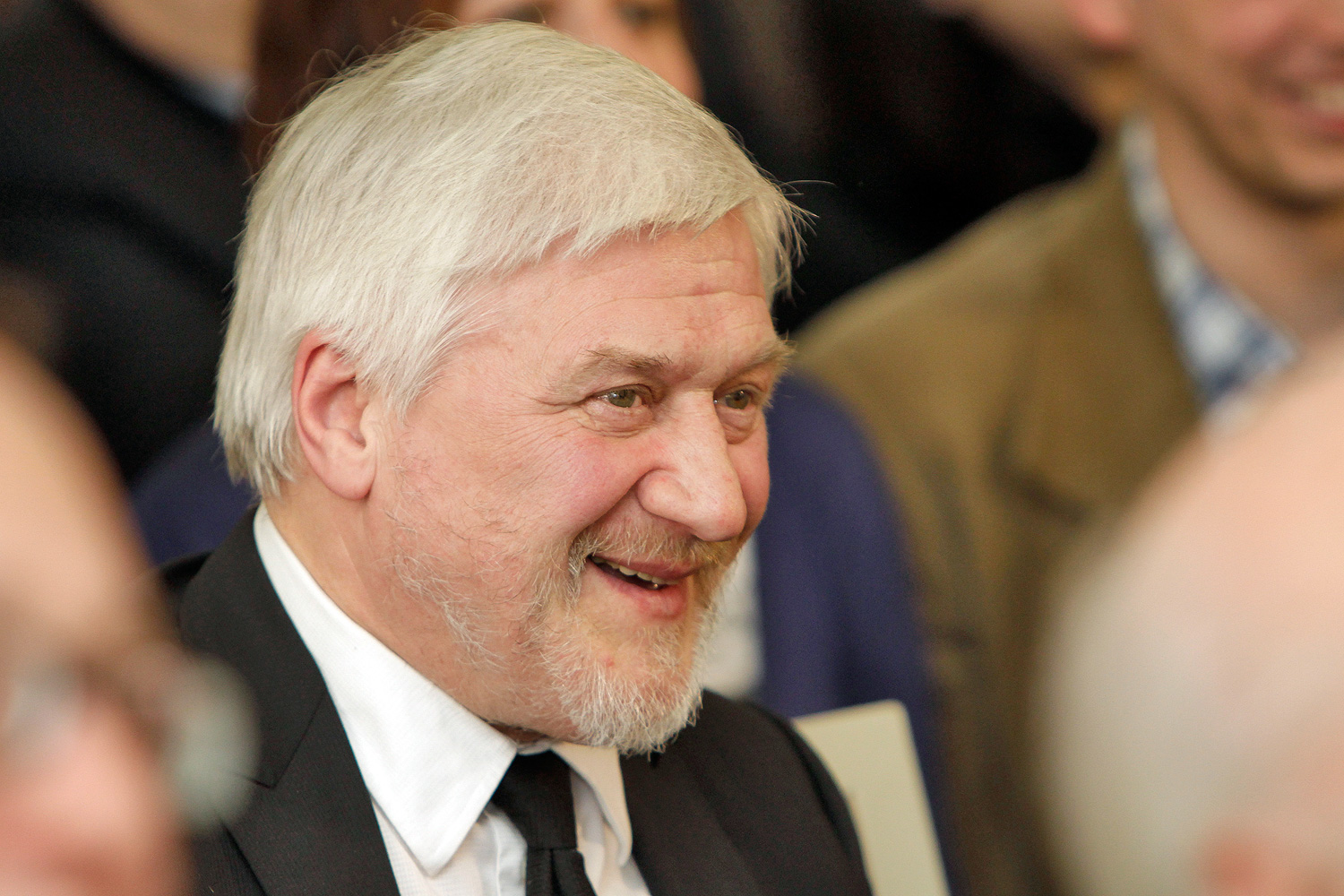
Jonas Vaitkus in 2010

Jonas Vaitkus (born 20 May 1944) is a Lithuanian theatre and film director, and academic.

== Early life and education ==
Jonas Vaitkus was born on 20 May 1944 in Lithuania.

From 1969 to 1974, he studied at the Leningrad State Institute of Theatre, Music, and Cinema in Saint Petersburg, Russia.

From 1978 to 1980 he studied cinematography for two years at the All-Union State Institute of Cinematography (VGIK). (Note: Bio says "State Cinematography Committee in Moscow" - but unlikely to be anything else.)

== Career ==
From 1974 to 1975 he was chief of the Šiauliai Drama Theatre.

Between 1977 and 1988, he was director and then chief director of Kaunas State Drama Theatre, and from 1989 to 1995 was the artistic director of the Lithuanian National Drama Theatre.

In 1980, he was appointed director of the Lithuanian Film Studios, and in 1988 started lecturing at the Department of Acting at the Lithuanian Academy of Music and Theatre (Lithuanian State Conservatory).

From 1990 to 1995 he was artistic director of the Lithuanian State Academic Drama Theatre. During this time, in 1991, he was Visiting Lecturer in Performing Arts at Emerson College, a private university in Boston, Massachusetts, U.S., and from 1992 to 1993, visiting lecturer in acting at the visiting lecturer in acting at Statens teaterhøgskole (now Oslo National Academy of the Arts), in Oslo, Norway.

In 2008, he was appointed director of the Russian Drama Theatre of Lithuania in Vilnius.

Vaitkus has mentored a number of actors and directors, including director Oskaras Koršunovas and actress Ingeborga Dapkūnaitė. He has directed several films, including Utterly Alone (Vienui vieni; 2004) and A Thrush, a Green Bird (Drozd - ptakha zelyonaya; 1990).

In February 2018, following the worldwide spread of the Me Too movement Vaitkus was publicly accused of sexual harassment or assault by some of his former students. He has denied the allegations, claiming instead that this is a defamation campaign carried out by Russian propaganda.

== Awards and nominations ==
Vaitkus has won several awards including:

- 1987: Lithuanian State Award
- 1990: "Scotsman Fringe First Award", Edinburgh Fringe, Scotland
- 1990: "Golden Fleece" award for the best musical film at the International Musical Film Festival in Tbilisi, Georgia
- 1996: St. Christopher Award for the best director of the year
- 2004: National Award
- 2008: Nominated, Best Male Supporting Actor in Sidabrinė gervė, for Perlas
