= The Southern Chronicles =

- Lithuanian theatrical release poster
- Lithuanian: Pietinia Kronikas
- Directed by: Ignas Miškinis
- Screenplay by: Eglė Vertelytė
- Based on: Pietinia Kronikas by Rimantas Kmita
- Produced by: Lukas Trimonis
- Starring: Džiugas Grinys; Robertas Petraitis; Digna Kulionytė
- Cinematography: Narvydas Naujalis
- Edited by: Danielius Kokanauskis
- Music by: Vytis Puronas
- Production companies: Lietuvos Televizija iN SCRiPT
- Release dates: November 6, 2024 (Cottbus); January 24, 2025 (Lithuania); May 23, 2025 (Estonia)
- Running time: 120 minutes
- Countries: Lithuania; Estonia
- Language: Lithuanian
- Box office: US$3.7 million

The Southern Chronicles (Lithuanian: Pietinia Kronikas) is a 2024 coming-of-age comedy-drama film directed by Ignas Miškinis and written by Eglė Vertelytė. Based on the 2016 novel of the same name by Rimantas Kmita, the film is a joint Lithuanian-Estonian co-production, starring Džiugas Grinys, Robertas Petraitis and Digna Kulionytė.

The film competed in the main competition at the 28th Tallinn Black Nights Film Festival on November 21, 2024, where it won Best Baltic Film. It won 12 Silver Crane Awards including Best Feature Film, Best Director, Best Actor for Džiugas Grinys, Best Supporting Actress for Irena Sikorskytė and Best Screenplay.

It was selected as Lithuanian's entry for the 98th Academy Awards for Best International Feature Film, but it was not nominated.

The movie became a mass commercial success as it was the highest-grossing film in the country in 2025 and is currently the highest-grossing Lithuanian film ever made.

== Synopsis ==
Set in the early-1990s, a few years after Lithuania's re-independence, Rimantas is a 17-year-old boy who is more interested in playing rugby, listening to music, and dealing on the black market with his friend Minde than in studying. However, when he falls in love with the beautiful, middle-class Monika, his faith in love and the future is put to the test.

== Cast ==
The actors participating in this film are:

- Džiugas Grinys as Rimantas
- Digna Kulionytė as Monika
- Robertas Petraitis as Minde
- Irena Sikorskytė as Jurga
- Rasa Samuolytė as Lithuanian language teacher
- Vaidile Juozaityte as Edita
- Dovile Silkaityte as Rimantas' Mother
- Algirdas Dainavicius as Rimantas' Father
- Neringa Varnelyte as Monika's Mother
- Dainius Gavenonis as Monika's Father
- Vaidotas Martinaitis as Rugby Coach 1
- Julius Zalakevicius as Rugby Coach 2
- Sarunas Rapolas Meliesius as Darius

== Production ==
Principal photography took place in the summer of 2022 in Šiauliai, Lithuania.

== Release ==
The film had its world premiere on November 6, 2024, at the 34th International Film Festival Cottbu, then screened on November 21, 2024, at the 28th Tallinn Black Nights Film Festival, and on January 14, 2025, at the 35th Tromsø International Film Festival.

The film was released commercially on January 24, 2025, in Lithuanian theaters, and on May 23, 2025, in Estonian theaters.

== Reception ==
=== Box office ===
In its debut weekend, the film attracted 57,948 viewers for a total of €453,455, making it the highest-grossing opening weekend in the country's history, surpassing Avatar: The Way of Water, Slender Man, Ashes in the Snow, and Frozen 2. In its third weekend in theaters, the film was seen by a total of 260,775 viewers, grossing €2.63 million.

Almost two months after its commercial release, it became the highest-grossing Lithuanian film in history.

=== Accolades ===
Award	Ceremony date	Category	Recipient(s)	Result	Ref.
Tallinn Black Nights Film Festival	24 November 2024	Best Baltic Film	The Southern Chronicles	Won	
Silver Crane Awards	8 June 2025	Best Feature Film	The Southern Chronicles	Won	
Silver Crane Awards	8 June 2025	Best Director	Ignas Miškinis	Won	
Silver Crane Awards	8 June 2025	Best Actor	Džiugas Grinys	Won	
Silver Crane Awards	8 June 2025	Best Supporting Actress	Digna Kulionyte	Nominated	
Silver Crane Awards	8 June 2025	Best Supporting Actress	Irena Sikorskytė	Won	
Silver Crane Awards	8 June 2025	Best Supporting Actor	Robertas Petraitis	Won	
Silver Crane Awards	8 June 2025	Best Screenplay	Eglė Vertelytė	Won	
Silver Crane Awards	8 June 2025	Best Cinematographer	Narvydas Naujalis	Nominated	
Silver Crane Awards	8 June 2025	Best Editor	Danielius Kokanauskis	Won	
Silver Crane Awards	8 June 2025	Best Composer	Vytis Puronas	Nominated	
Silver Crane Awards	8 June 2025	Best Make-up	Vaida Navickaitė	Won	
Silver Crane Awards	8 June 2025	Best Costume Design	Agnė Biskytė	Won	
Silver Crane Awards	8 June 2025	Best Production Design	Aurimas Akšys	Won	
Silver Crane Awards	8 June 2025	Best Sound Design	Saulius Urbanavičius	Won	
Silver Crane Awards	8 June 2025	Audience Award	The Southern Chronicles	Won	

== See also ==
- Cinema of Lithuania
- List of submissions to the 98th Academy Awards for Best International Feature Film
- List of Lithuanian submissions for the Academy Award for Best International Feature Film
