= David Gray (director) =

American film director

- Born: Rochester, New York
- Education: Syracuse University, BFA (cum laude)
- Occupations: Filmmaker, commercial director
- Spouse: Elyssa Gray
- Children: Ethan Gray, Justin Gray
- Website: davidgraydirector.com

David Gray is an American filmmaker, commercial director, and former creative director at Goodby, Silverstein & Partners and BBDO. He has worked with numerous brands including Nike, Visa, American Express, Microsoft, FedEX, Time Warner, Showtime, Volkswagen, and GEICO.

== Life and career ==
Gray grew up in Rochester, NY and graduated cum laude from Syracuse University. He was an art director at Saatchi & Saatchi in New York City and worked on various packaged goods like Tide, Cascade, and General Mills cereals.

At BBDO, Gray was promoted to creative director on their Snickers account and co-created the award winning "Not going anywhere for a while?" campaign. His work was honored as Campaign of the Year by AdWeek and Commercial of the Year by Advertising Age. In 1997, BBDO was named Agency of the Year at the Cannes Lions International Festival of Creativity in large part due to the success of Gray's campaign.

In 1997, Gray joined Goodby, Silverstein & Partners as creative director on their E*Trade and Nike accounts, which also merited him numerous awards. Advertising Age named Goodby, Silverstein & Partners Agency of the Year in both 1999 and 2000, again in part due to Gray's work. His E*Trade "Monkey," "Monkey II," and "Wazoo" spots have been named some of the best Super Bowl ads of all-time.

After his success as an art director, Gray returned to filmmaking and started directing commercials with Hungry Man in New York. Shortly after his debut, he was nominated for the prestigious Commercial Director of the Year Award by the Directors Guild of America, which is bestowed on upon the industry's Top 5 directors each year. From Hungry Man, he went onto direct with Station Film, and is now on SKUNK's roster in Los Angeles.

David Gray currently resides in Rye, New York.

== Awards ==
- 2013: Cannes Lions, Bronze for "Curfew"
- 2012: D&AD, Nominee for "History of America"
- 2007: DGA, Director of the Year, Nominee
- 2006: London International Advertising Awards, Entertainment, for "Transvestite"
- 2006: Effie, Gold, for "Transvestite"
- 2006: One Show, Pencil, for "Transvestite"
- 2006: D&AD, Yellow Pencil, for "Transvestite"
- 2006: Cannes Lions, Bronze, for "Transvestite"
- 2000: London International Advertising Awards, Banking & Financial Services, for "Monkey," "Tri-Mount," and "Wazoo"
- 2000: Clio Awards, Media Promotion, for "Wazoo"
- 2000: International ANDY Awards, Financial Products & Services, for "Wazoo"
- 2000: Cannes Lions, Silver, for "Basketball"
- 2000: Cannes Lions, Silver, for "Tri-Mount"
- 2000: Cannes Lions, Gold, for "Monkey"
- 1998: Cannes Lions, Gold, for "Cologne"
- 1997: Cannes Lions, Silver, for "Team Prayer"
- 1997: Cannes Lions, Silver, for "Football Player"
- 1997: Cannes Lions, Silver, for "Batman"
- 1997: Cannes Lions, Silver, for "Chefs"
- 1997: AICP Awards, Humor, for "Chefs"
- 1997: Advertising Age's The Best Awards, Best TV Commercial, for "Chefs"
- 1997: AdWeek Campaign of the Year, for Snickers campaign
