= Regina Varnaitė =

Lithuanian actress (born 1927)

- Born: Regina Marija Varnaitė-Eidukaitienė; 19 May 1927 (age 97); Ukmergė, Lithuania
- Education: Russian Institute of Theatre Arts
- Occupation: Actress
- Years active: 1961–present
- Spouse: Vytautas Eidukaitis (m. 1954; died 1989)
- Children: 2
- Honours: Order of the Lithuanian Grand Duke Gediminas

Regina Varnaitė (born 19 May 1927) is a Lithuanian actress of film, stage and television.

== Biography ==
Varnaitė was born on 1927 in Ukmergė. Her father was a villager and her mother a religious Catholic. She grew up together with her brother Erikas Varnas who was a painter. In 1946, she graduated from A. Smetona Gymnasium in Ukmergė, passed her exams and was accepted to study at the Kaunas Drama Theater Studio.

Varnaitė appeared in various theatrical shows in tragedy, drama, comedy and in cinematography. She was married to actor Vytautas Eidukaitis until his death in 1989. They had two daughters, Vyta Eidukaitytė-Martinavičienė who is a ballet dancer and Aušra Eidukaittė who is a painter.

For her merits as an artist, Varnaitė received People's Artist of Lithuania and Order of the Lithuanian Grand Duke Gediminas.

== Filmography ==
- Giminės. Gyvenimas tęsiasi (2015–2018) - Paulė Sakalytė
- Giminės. Po dvidešimties metų (2011)
- Giminės (1993)
- Benjaminas Kordusas (1986) - Kotryna
- Bez Semyi (1984) - Nun
- Raudonmedžio rojus (1980)
- Pasigailėk mūsų (1979)
- Mainai (1977)
- Žvangutis (1974) - Valiūlienė
- Velnio nuotaka (1974) - Ursula
- Kanonada (1961) - Magdute
