= Wonderful Losers: A Different World =

2017 film

- Film poster
- Directed by: Arūnas Matelis
- Written by: Arūnas Matelis
- Cinematography: Giacomo Becherini; Paolo Beniti; Giordano Bianchi; Valdis Celmins; Jose Luis Gonzales; Audrius Kemezys; Mark Olexa; Simone Rivoire; Fabio Saba; Ivars Zviedris
- Edited by: Mirjam Jegorov
- Music by: Alberto R. Lucendo
- Distributed by: Studio Nominum
- Release date: 13 October 2017 (Warsaw FF)
- Running time: 71 minutes
- Country: Lithuania
- Languages: Italian; English; Dutch
- Box office: $94,644

Wonderful Losers: A Different World (Lithuanian: Nuostabieji lūzeriai. Kita planeta) is a 2017 Lithuanian documentary film directed by Arūnas Matelis about the Giro d'Italia. It was selected as the Lithuanian entry for the Best Foreign Language Film at the 91st Academy Awards, but it was not nominated. The film won the Judges’ Special Prize at the 2018 Kendal Mountain Festival.

== Synopsis ==
The film profiles the unsung heroes of medics and water carriers working in the world of competitive cycling.

== See also ==
- List of submissions to the 91st Academy Awards for Best Foreign Language Film
- List of Lithuanian submissions for the Academy Award for Best Foreign Language Film
