= Vaiva Mainelytė =

Lithuanian theater and film actress

- Education: Lithuanian Academy of Music and Theatre (1970)
- Occupations: Theater and film actress
- Spouse(s): Gintautas Ūzas, Rimantas Juodvalkis
- Children: Dovilė Ūzaitė-Juodvalkytė
- Parents: Adolfas (father); Irena (mother)

Vida Vaiva Mainelytė (born September 5, 1948) is a Lithuanian theater and film actress.

In 1970, she graduated from the Lithuanian State Conservatory (currently the Lithuanian Academy of Music and Theatre). Since then, she has worked in Šiauliai Drama Theatre, Lithuanian USSR Drama Theatre, and Lithuanian National Drama Theatre.

== Political activity ==
She was a supporter of Kazimira Prunskienė and took part in the activities of the New Democracy Party (Moterų partija) and the Lithuanian Farmers and Greens Union (Valstiečių liaudininkų sąjunga, or LVŽS).

In the 2008 parliamentary election, she stood unsuccessfully in the Vilnius Žirmūnai single-member constituency on the LVŽS list and received 2.61% of the vote in that constituency.

== Filmography ==
Year	Original title	Translated title	Role
1970	Vyrų vasara	Men’s Summer	Aldona (teacher)
1971	Rudobelės respublika	The Republic of Rudobelė	Helena
1971	Paskutinis „Albatroso“ reisas	The Last "Albatros" Voyage	Juta
1971	Maža išpažintis	A Small Confession	Giraffe (teacher)
1972	Tadas Blinda	Tadas Blinda	Morta
1974	Velnio nuotaka	The Devil's Bride	Jurga, Marcelė
1975	Laikas nelaukia	Time Does Not Wait	Madonna
1976	Seklio Kalio nuotykiai	The Adventures of Detective Kali	Eva’s mother
1977	Vyras pačiame žydėjime	A Man in Full Bloom	Maija
1977	Mainai	The Exchange	Eugenija
1978	Karaliai ir kopūstai	Kings and Cabbages	Izabelė
1979	Tas fantastiškas pasaulis	That Fantastic World	
1980	Žaltvykslės	Glowworms	The Queen
1980	Faktas	The Fact	Kazia Buckuvienė
1981	Lošimas be kozirių	The Game Without Trumps	Sabina
1981	Endhauzo paslaptis	The Secret of Endhouse	Frederika
1981	Frontas priešo užnugaryje	The Front Behind the Lines	Helena
1981	Vasara baigiasi rudenį	Summer Ends in Autumn	Milda
1982	Turtuolis, vargšas...	The Rich, the Poor...	Teacher
1982	Anglų valsas	English Waltz	Molė Gvyn
1983	Dvi dalys iš šeimos kronikos	Two Parts from a Family Chronicle	Linda
1984	Stasė Ustjanauskienė	Nine Circles of Decline	Stasė Ustjanauskienė
1985	Sofija Kovalevskaja	Sofia Kovalevskaya	Šarlotė
1986	Chameleono žaidimai	Chameleon Games	Veronika
2003	Lietuviškas tranzitas	Lithuanian Transit	Strip club owner
2005	Debesėlis ir Faustas	Little Cloud and Faustas	
2008	Broliai	Brothers	Marija Aušrinė
2010	Širdys paklydėlės	Lost Hearts	Salomėja
2012	Be namų	Without a Home	Genovaitė

== Awards ==
- 1982: Honored Artist of Lithuanian SSR.
- 1983: Winner of the Union Film Festival, Leningrad.
- 1980s: Veteran Order of Merit of Labor of Vietnam.
- 1985: Lithuanian SSR State Prize.
- 1999: Honorary Citizen of Rokiškis District.
- 2004: Officer's Cross of the Order of Vytautas the Great.
- 2012: Golden Crane Award, for lifetime achievement.
- 2012: Commander's Grand Cross of the Order for Merits to Lithuania.
