= Marius Jampolskis =

Lithuanian actor and TV host

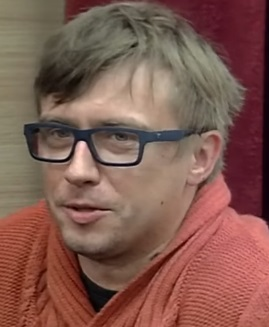
- Jampolskis in 2015
- Born: Marius Jampolskis; 18 August 1978 (age 47); Kaunas, Lithuania
- Occupation: Actor
- Years active: 2003–present

Marius Jampolskis is a Lithuanian actor and TV host.

== Film and television credits ==
Film
Year	Title	Role	Notes
2003	Dr. Jekyll and Mr. Hyde (TV movie)	Boy With Note	
2004	Ratten 2 - Sie kommen wieder!	Jan Bartmann	
2005	Forest of the Gods	SS Guard leading the Professor	
2006	Khottabych	Gena	
2008	Kolekcioniere	Editor	
2009	Hot Dog	Adam	Short film
2011	Vanishing Waves	Lucas	

Television
Year	Title	Role	Notes
2003	P.O.W.	POW #1	6 Episodes
2008–present	Moterys meluoja geriau	Donatas	
