= Vanishing Waves =

- Directed by: Kristina Buožytė
- Written by: Kristina Buožytė; Bruno Samper
- Produced by: Ieva Norviliene
- Starring: Marius Jampolskis; Jurga Jutaitė; Rudolfas Jansonas; Vytautas Kaniušonis
- Cinematography: Feliksas Abrukauskas
- Edited by: Suzanne Fenn
- Music by: Peter Von Poehl
- Production company: Tremora
- Release date: 3 July 2012 (Karlovy Vary)
- Running time: 120 minutes
- Countries: Lithuania; France; Belgium
- Language: Lithuanian

Vanishing Waves (originally titled Aurora) is a 2012 sci-fi thriller film directed by Kristina Buožytė.

== Plot ==
After a long period of preparation, neuroscientists start a spectacular research project. A member of the team, the matter-of-fact and dispassionate Lukas, is to be networked with the brain of an anonymous, comatose test person and immerse himself in their worlds of thought, but only observe. Already on the second attempt, Lukas encounters the highly real-looking imagination of a young woman who lies soaked and unconscious on the beach. While Luke tries to ventilate her, the woman comes to consciousness and begins to kiss him intimately. Passionate intimacies follow. The surprised and irritated Lukas conceals his experience from his research colleagues and claims to have experienced only shadowy impressions during the connection. He is pushing for further attempts. Already at the next networking, an intoxicating lovemaking develops between the two in an empty, sun-drenched room. While the spiritual ties between the two are getting stronger and stronger, Lukas increasingly closes himself off to his colleagues, worried friends and also to his long-time partner Lina, which destroys the relationship of the two, which is already weakened by everyday life and routine. Violating the rules of the research experiment, he makes real contact with the patient. He finds out that her name is Aurora and she fell into a coma in a car accident that her husband did not survive.

The joint sessions become darker, more unsatisfying and overshadowed by the latent presence of another man who seems to burden and inhibit everything. Lukas, for whom the spiritual fusion with Aurora has long since developed into an obsession, becomes increasingly aggressive. When he suddenly sees the man standing next to Aurora at a meeting and talking to her quietly, he beats him wildly and escalates into a bloody rush of violence. The real Aurora then suffers a cardiac arrest, barely survives and is dying. Now Lukas can no longer and does not want to conceal what he really experiences and is heavily criticized by the head of the project. Shocked by himself, Lukas accepts his resignation and only asks for a last network. Lukas runs naked after Aurora who is also naked in the dark. Sometimes he seems to catch and chase up with her, sometimes she seems to catch up with him. After a seemingly endless chase and run, he finally reaches her. Quietly, they tell each other intimate memories and disappointments of their lives. Lukas asks Aurora for forgiveness. She forgives him and says that he will live. Lukas wakes up after having to be resuscitated with a defibrillator. Seeing Aurora lying dead on the gurney next to him, he kisses her and draws the sheet over her face.

== Cast ==
- Marius Jampolskis as Lucas
- Jurga Jutaitė
- Rudolfas Jansonas
- Vytautas Kaniušonis

== Reception ==
The film received a special mention at the 2012 Karlovy Vary International Film Festival.
