= Arūnas Matelis =

Lithuanian documentary film director

Arūnas Matelis (born 9 April 1961, in Kaunas) is a Lithuanian documentary film director. From 1979 till 1983 Arūnas Matelis studied mathematics at Vilnius University and later in 1989 graduated from the Lithuanian Music Academy. In 1992, he established one of the first independent film production companies in Lithuania, "Nominum". In 2006 Matelis became a full member of European Film Academy with the right to vote.

== Filmography ==
- Pelesos milžinai (1989)
- Baltijos kelias (1989)
- Dešimt minučių prieš Ikaro skrydį (1991)
- Autoportretas (1993)
- Iš dar nebaigtų Jeruzalės pasakų (1996)
- Pirmasis atsisveikinimas su Rojum (1998)
- Priverstinės emigracijos dienoraštis (1999)
- Skrydis per Lietuvą arba 510 sekundžių tylos (Flight over Lithuania or 510 seconds of silence) (2000)
- Sekmadienis. Evangelija pagal liftininką Albertą (2003)
- Prieš parskrendant į žemę (Before Flying Back to Earth) (2005)
- Wonderful Losers: A Different World (2017)

== Awards ==
Matelis is one of the recipients of the Lithuanian National Prize of 2005.

"Prieš parskrendant į žemę", the first feature-length documentary by Matelis about children hospitalized with leukemia, is the most highly acclaimed Lithuanian film and is considered one of the best European documentary films of 2005, awarded in numerous festivals:

- Best documentary in Directors Guild of America Awards 2006
- Best Lithuanian Film 2005 by Lithuanian Filmmakers Union
- Silver Wolf in International Documentary Film Festival Amsterdam (IDFA), 2005
- Golden Dove in International Leipzig Festival for Documentary and Animated Film, 2005
- Main Prize in Festival Documenta Madrid, 2005
- "Spirit Award for Documentary" in Brooklyn International Film Festival, 2006
- Grand Prix in Pärnu International Film Festival, 2006
- Special Jury Mention in Silverdocs Festival, 2006
- Veliki pečat international competition award in ZagrebDox Film Festival, 2006

The film is nominated for the European Film Academy best European documentary award of 2005.
