= Kristina Buožytė =

Lithuanian film director, screenwriter and editor

- Born: October 9, 1982 (age 43); Klaipėda, Lithuanian SSR, Soviet Union
- Education: Lithuanian Academy of Music and Theatre (LMTA)
- Occupations: Film director, screenwriter, editor
- Years active: 2005–present

Kristina Buožytė ([krʲɪstʲɪnɐ buəʑiːtʲeː]; born October 9, 1982) is a Lithuanian film director, screenwriter and producer. In her early films she focused on women, explored their inner world and depicted them using fantasy elements. Her science fiction film Vanishing Waves (original title Aurora) is described as a hypnotic, sensual sci-fi experience and sexually explicit sci-fi tale which was rewarded with 22 international awards in Europe and North America. Her latest science fiction film, the bio-fantasy Vesper, done in collaboration with Bruno Samper, has been described as a "melancholic fairytale".

== Career ==
Kristina Buožytė was born in Klaipėda, Lithuania. As an adolescent, she admired fantasy literature and attended theatre classes at Klaipeda Youth Theatre wanting to become an actress or a theatre director. In 2001 Buožytė entered Lithuanian Academy of Music and Theatre in Vilnius, but there was no course for theatre directing at that time, so she started studying Film and TV directing instead and got immersed in the cinema world. The film-maker graduated the academy with a bachelor's degree in 2005 and master's degree in 2008 both in Film and TV directing.

During her years at the academy Buožytė created a number of short feature films, actively participated at Summer Media Studio in Juodkrantė, Lithuania, where she was awarded with the Best Film Marketing for Change the Record in 2005 and the Best Documentary Screenwriter for Send Me a Letter in 2006 as well as working in several film and TV companies as editor, script supervisor and director. Buožytė's first notable piece is the bachelor's degree diploma short film Change the Record. It is a comedic story about the young women who is longing for romantic feelings and involves in a relationship with a tiny man who appears while the vinyl records plays. The film was selected for the student film festival Cinema Mines'05 (Kino minos'05) and received positive feedbacks from both critics and cinema professionals. Lithuanian cinema critic Skirmantas Valiulis drew correlation between Buožytė's Change the Record and Pedro Almodóvar's Talk To Her where a tiny man engages in sexual activity.

=== The Collectress (Kolekcionierė) ===
Kristina Buožytė's master's degree diploma film The Collectress is about a young woman Gailė (Gabija Ryškuvienė) who lost her ability to feel the emotions after her father's death. In order to regain the feelings Gailė has to film the situations and watch them again. She starts to construct sexual situations, thus 'the collection' grows. According to the film-maker, the idea for the screenplay came when searching for the reason why people react to emotions shown on the screen more intensively than to those in real life. From its original plot itself to the visual depiction of the essential instincts, The Collectress was review as a Freudian, brave and controversial film which contributes a new and fresh piece in Lithuanian cinema.

The film was warmly welcomed internationally: it was shown in more than 30 film festivals in Europe (Karlovy Vary, Pusan, Valencia Film Festival, Meinheim, Kinoshock (in Anapa, Russia), North Africa (Cairo Film Festival) and South America (São Paulo). Buožytė received The Best Film Award in Lithuanian Cinema and TV Awards Silver Crane (Sidabrinė gervė) and the Best Director Award at the Kinoshock film festival in Russia in 2008. The international success of the film-maker's debut opened possibilities for her further career.

=== Vanishing Waves (Aurora) ===
Buožytė's second feature film Vanishing Waves is about the emotionally remote scientist Lucas (Marius Jampolskis) who participates in neurological experiment where he successfully contacts a young comatose woman named Aurora (Jurga Jutaitė). Lucas subconsciously communicates with Aurora's suppressed personality, breaks the rules and lies to the superiors about their relationship. Because of the uncertain boundaries between dream and reality Vanishing Waves is often compared with Christopher Nolan’s Inception, except when Christopher Nolan's films are called sterile and sexless, Buožytė gives the audiences an immersive depiction of unconscious dreamworld as a surreal and explicit psychosexual smorgasbord that would make Freud blush. Vanishing Waves is also compared to Stanley Kubrick's Eyes Wide Shut because of its soft-core sex scenes and Tarkovsky's Solaris because of its symbolic titular planet. Meanwhile the director points out that film explores the psychological aspects of the relationships - all the feelings, the attitudes, the sufferings and the pleasures begin in human's head, thus the main focus is on the egocentrism of the main character and its transformation during the experiences of desire, pleasure and love. It is the first science fiction film made in Lithuania and the first Lithuanian film distributed in North America.

Vanishing Waves was named the Best European Fantasy Film in 2012 and received 21 other awards of which 15 went to Kristina Buožytė for her creative work as a screenwriter and director. Buožytė's films fulfilled with eroticism, philosophical searching, and visual splendor makes her new provocative and exited European talent and it deserves to be noticed by cinephiles around the world.

== Filmography ==
Short film

| Year | Title | Director | Writer | Editor | Notes |
|---|---|---|---|---|---|
| 2003 | Stop! | Yes | Yes | Yes | |
| 2003 | Fatamorgana | Yes | Yes | No | |
| 2003 | The Hole (Skylė) | Yes | Yes | Yes | |
| 2004 | Experiment (Eksperimentas) | Yes | No | Yes | |
| 2004 | The Poem (Poema) | Yes | No | No | |
| 2004 | The Dolbies (Kuklūs vyrukai) | Yes | Yes | Yes | |
| 2004 | Ward No 23 (23 palata) | Yes | Yes | Yes | |
| 2005 | Change the Record (Pakeisk plokštelę) | Yes | Yes | Yes | |
| 2006 | Juozas Meškauskas | Yes | Yes | Yes | Documentary short |
| 2014 | K is for Knell | Yes | Yes | No | Segment of ABCs of Death 2; Co-directed with Bruno Samper; Also producer |

Feature film

| Year | Title | Director | Writer | Producer |
|---|---|---|---|---|
| 2008 | The Collectress (Kolekcionierė) | Yes | Yes | No |
| 2012 | Vanishing Waves | Yes | Yes | No |
| 2022 | Vesper | Yes | Yes | Yes |

== Awards and nominations ==
| Year | Award | Category | Title | Result | Ref. |
|---|---|---|---|---|---|
| 2008 | Lithuanian Cinema and TV Awards Silver Crane (Sidabrinė gervė) | Best Film | The Collectress | Won | |
| 2008 | Lithuanian Cinema and TV Awards Silver Crane (Sidabrinė gervė) | Best Director | The Collectress | Nominated | |
| 2008 | Lithuanian Cinema and TV Awards Silver Crane (Sidabrinė gervė) | Best Screenplay | The Collectress | Nominated | |
| 2008 | XVII Open Film Festival of CIS countries, Latvia, Lithuania and Estonia Kinoshock 2008 | Best Director | The Collectress | Won | |
| 2012 | Karlovy Vary International Film Festival Program: East of West | Special Mention | Vanishing Waves | Won | |
| 2012 | Neuchâtel International Fantastic Film Festival | Special Mention of the International Jury | Vanishing Waves | Won | |
| 2012 | Neuchâtel International Fantastic Film Festival | Narcisse Award for Best Feature Film | Vanishing Waves | Nominated | |
| 2012 | Palić Film Festival | Special Mention | Vanishing Waves | Won | |
| 2012 | Miskolc International Film Festival | Jameson Features | Vanishing Waves | Won | |
| 2012 | Miskolc International Film Festival | Emeric Pressburger Prize | Vanishing Waves | Won | |
| 2012 | Fantastic Fest | Best Picture | Vanishing Waves | Won | |
| 2012 | Fantastic Fest | Best Director | Vanishing Waves | Won | |
| 2012 | Fantastic Fest | Best Spreenplay | Vanishing Waves | Won | |
| 2012 | Lund International Fantastic Film Festival | Feature Film Méliès d'Argent | Vanishing Waves | Won | |
| 2012 | Sitges - Festival Internacional de Cinema de Catalunya | Feature Film Méliès d'Or | Vanishing Waves | Won | |
| 2012 | Rio Grind Film Festival | Best Film | Vanishing Waves | Won | |
| 2013 | Lithuanian Cinema and TV Awards Silver Crane | Best Film | Vanishing Waves | Won | |
| 2013 | Lithuanian Cinema and TV Awards Silver Crane | Best Director | Vanishing Waves | Won | |
| 2013 | Lithuanian Cinema and TV Awards Silver Crane | Best Screenplay | Vanishing Waves | Won | |
| 2013 | Jameson Dublin International Film Festival | Best Screenplay | Vanishing Waves | Won | |
| 2022 | Bucheon International Fantastic Film Festival | Jury's Choice | Vesper | Won | |
| 2022 | Bucheon International Fantastic Film Festival | Golden Raven | Vesper | Won | |
