= Utterly Alone =

- DVD cover
- Directed by: Jonas Vaitkus
- Written by: Alvydas Bausys; Jonas Vaitkus
- Produced by: Kęstutis Petrulis; Vytautas Vilimas
- Starring: Vladas Bagdonas; Saulius Balandis; Brigita Bublyte
- Cinematography: Algimantas Mikutėnas
- Release date: February 20, 2004
- Running time: 90 minutes
- Country: Lithuania
- Language: Lithuanian

Utterly Alone (Lithuanian: Vienui Vieni) is a 2004 Lithuanian film directed by Jonas Vaitkus, based on real events, about Juozas Lukša (code name Daumantas), a Lithuanian partisan who fought against the Soviet occupation of Lithuania in the years immediately following World War II. The film is set in 1950–51 and shot in black and white.

== Plot ==
The film portrays Lukša's attempts, during trips to Western Europe, to gain support for the armed anti-Soviet resistance (known as the Forest Brothers), whose fortunes in a guerrilla war against Soviet authorities were waning, largely due to widespread infiltration and harsh crackdowns by the NKVD. The film depicts Lukša being killed in an ambush in Lithuania, although his body has never been found.
