= Lithuanian National Drama Theatre =

Theatre company in Vilnius, Lithuania

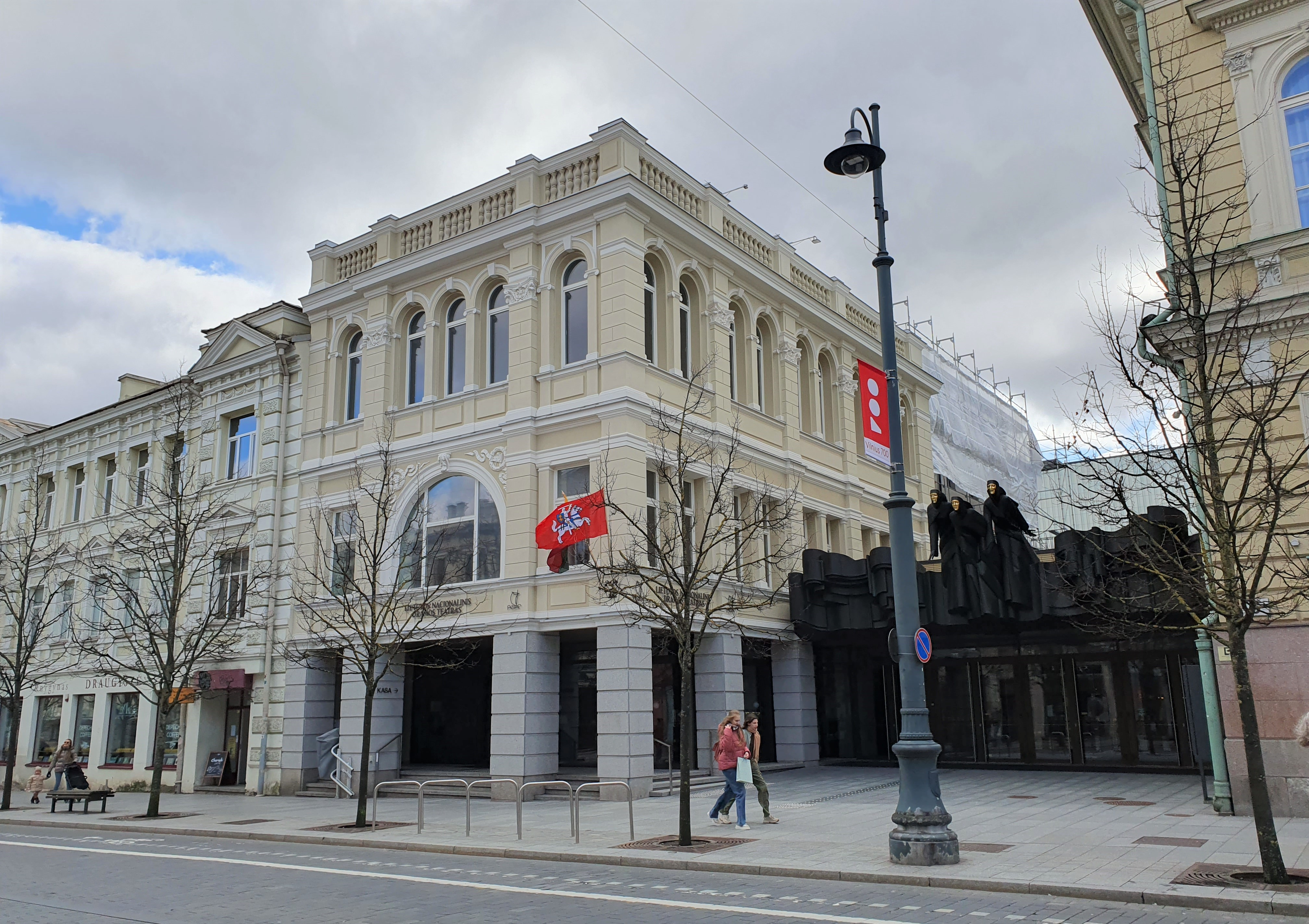
Lithuanian National Drama Theatre

Lithuanian National Drama Theatre (Lithuanian: Lietuvos nacionalinis dramos teatras), located on Gediminas Avenue in Vilnius, is one of Lithuania's most prominent publicly funded performing arts venues and cultural institutions. Founded as a Vilnius State Theatre in 1940, it became Lithuanian National Drama Theatre in 1998. The theatre's façade featuring the Feast of Muses (Lithuanian: Mūzų šventė) sculpture by Stanislovas Kuzma has become a landmark of Vilnius city.

== Notable productions ==
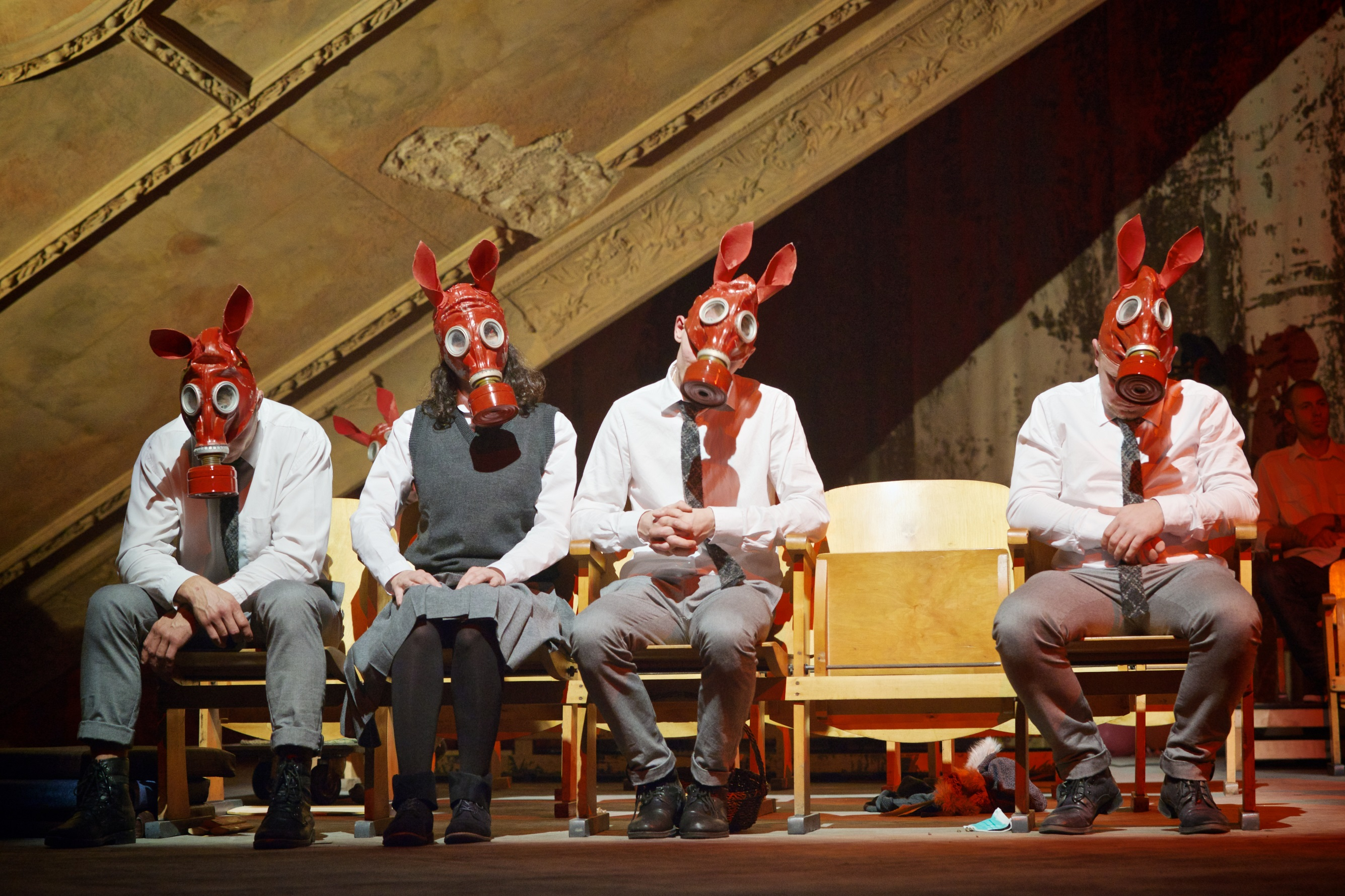
Mūsų klasė (Our Class) director Yana Ross

=== 2010–2016 ===
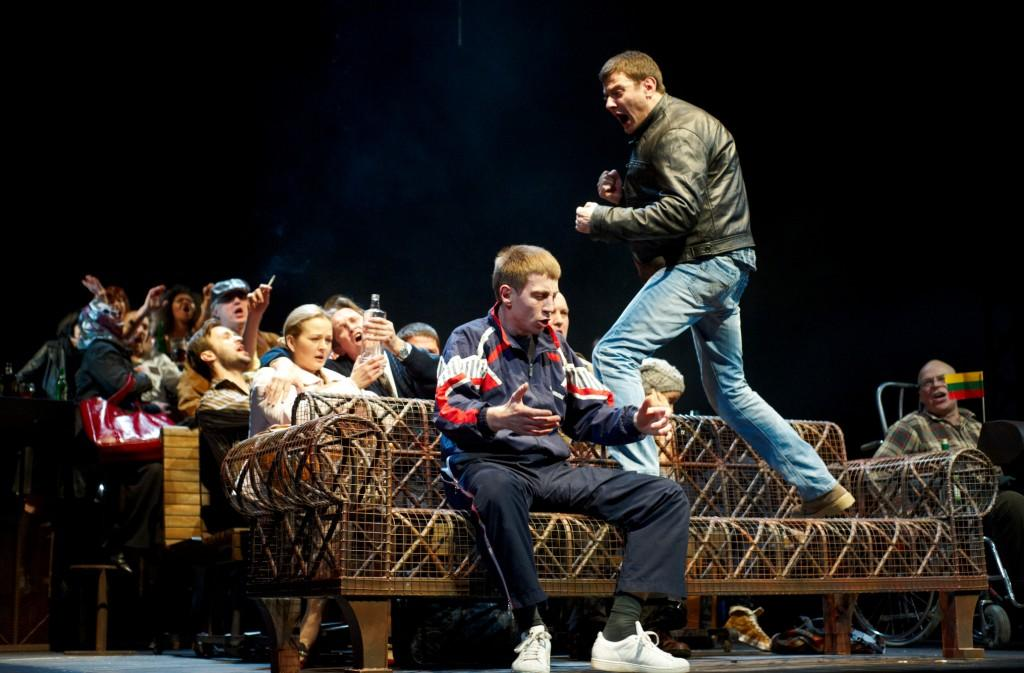
Išvarymas (Expulsion), director O. Koršunovas

- Visuomenės priešas (Public Enemy) by Henrik Ibsen directed by Jonas Vaitkus (2011)
- Chaosas (Chaos) by Mika Myllyaho directed by Yana Ross (2011)
- Išvarymas (Expulsion) by Marius Ivaškevičius, directed by Oskaras Koršunovas (2011)
- Katedra (Cathedral) by Justinas Marcinkevičius directed by Oskaras Koršunovas (2012)
- Mūsų klasė (Our Class) by Tadeusz Słobodzianek directed by Yana Ross (2013)
- Kosmosas+ (Cosmos+) directed by Kirsten Dehlholm (2014)
- Jelizaveta Bam (Elizabeth Bam) by Daniil Charms directed by Oskaras Koršunovas (2015)
- Kankinys (Martyr) by Marius von Mayenburg directed by Oskaras Koršunovas (2015)
- Didvyrių aikštė (Heroes‘ Square) by Thomas Bernhard directed by Krystian Lupa (2015)
- Borisas Godunovas (Boris Godunov) by Alexander Pushkin directed by Eimuntas Nekrošius (2015)
- Oidipo mitas (The Oedipus Myth) by Sophocles, Euripides, Aeschylus directed by Gintaras Varnas (2016)
