= Cinema of Lithuania =

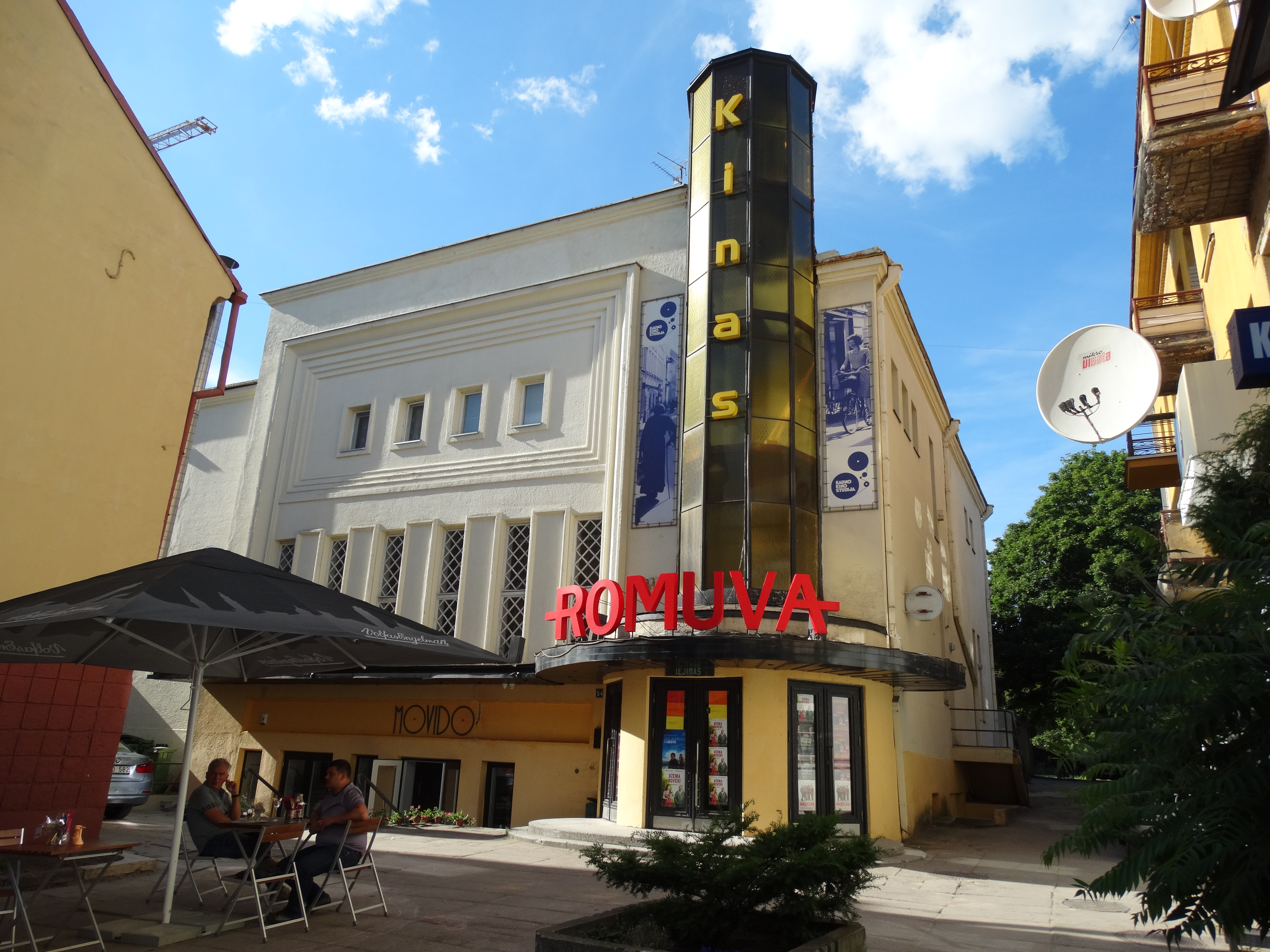
- Romuva Cinema, the oldest still operational movie theater in Lithuania
- No. of screens: 95 (2011)
  - Per capita: 3.4 per 100,000 (2011)
- Main distributors: Acme Filmai 46.0% Forum Cinemas 45.0% Incognito 5.0%

Produced feature films (2017)
- Total: 41
- Fictional: 29
- Animated: 7
- Documentary: 5

Number of admissions (2017)
- Total: 4.060.159
  - Per capita: 1,44
- National films: 21,47%

Gross box office (2017)
- Total: EUR 20.4 million

Films have been made in Lithuania since the early twentieth century.

== History ==
=== First Republic. 1918-1940 ===
On 28 July 1896, Thomas Edison live photography session was held in the Concerts Hall of the Botanical Garden of Vilnius University. After a year, similar American movies were available with the addition of special phonograph records that also provided sound. First cinema theatres opened in 1906 in Lithuania. In 1909, Lithuanian cinema pioneers Antanas Račiūnas and Ladislas Starevich released their first movies. Soon the Račiūnas' recordings of Lithuania's views became very popular among the Lithuanian Americans abroad. In 1925, Pranas Valuskis filmed movie Naktis Lietuvoje (Night in Lithuania) about Lithuanian book smugglers that left first bright Lithuanian footprint in Hollywood.

The first short films in 1909 were shot by Antanas Račiūnas who filmed the sights of his native village and Vladislav Starevich who made a short film Prie Nemuno (By the Nieman River, 1909) The first Lithuanian newsreel screened in cinemas in 1921 was made by Feognijus Dunajevas.

The first film production companies and first films schools were founded in 1926. In 1927 a short film Rūpestingas tėvas (Caring Father) was produced by Lietfilm. Lithuania's most important film directors during the era were Jurgis Linartas and Vladas Sipaitis. Kareivis – Lietuvos gynėjas (The Soldier Lithuania's Defender) (1928) and a feature film Onytė ir Jonelis (1931) produced by a film company Akis, are the most notable films of the era.

In 1927 first documentary films were created in Lithuania - Prezidentas Suvalkijoje (President in Suvalkija) ir Nemunu į Klaipėdos uostą (Down the River Nemunas to the Port of Klaipėda) by G. Jankauskas.

In 1931 first Lithuanian film critics journal Kino naujienos (Cinema news) established.

Documentary movie chronicles were created by Stepas Uzdonas, Stasys Vainalavičius, Antanas Uibas, Alfonsas Žibas, Kazys Lukšys and others.

The most significant and mature Lithuanian American movie of the time Aukso žąsis (Golden goose) was created in 1965 by Birutė Pūkelevičiūtė that featured motifs from the Brothers Grimm fairy tales.

=== Period of occupation. 1940 - 1990 ===
After the Soviet takeover in 1940 the Lithuanian Republican Newsreel Studio was founded, in 1962 it was renamed the Lithuanian Film Studio.

The first Soviet era feature film "Marytė" using Lithuanian composer and actors was produced by Mosfilm. Until 1956 all Lithuanian feature films were made in cooperation with other motion-picture studios in Soviet Union focusing on Communist themes.

After the death of Stalin in 1953 a more liberal period in Soviet Union's cultural policies followed. Filmmakers started to enjoy greater artistic control at the same time the Soviet State Committee for Cinematography (Goskino) in Moscow provided the money, state censorship body Glavlit and CPSU Department of Culture had the control over releasing the movies.

In 1957, the post-Stalinist era Lithuanian feature film Žydrasis horizontas (The Blue Horizon) was directed by Vytautas Mikalauskas. In 1968 - Feelings (Lithuanian: Jausmai) a Lithuanian drama film was directed by Algirdas Dausa and Almantas Grikevičius. In 1997, spectators and critics recognized it the best film in Lithuania.

Film directors Gytis Lukšas, Henrikas Šablevičius, Arūnas Žebriūnas, Raimondas Vabalas were able to overcome the obstacles of censorship and create valuable films.

In the late 1980s an independent Lithuanian national cinema industry was reborn during Perestroika social and political reforms in the Soviet Union. The first independent film production studio Kinema was founded by the director Šarūnas Bartas in 1987. Another notable documentary filmmaker emerged during the era is Arūnas Matelis.

Due to Soviet occupation Jonas Mekas was forced to leave Lithuania. In New York he created Anthology Film Archives and together with his brother Adolfas Mekas, he founded Film Culture.

=== Second Republic. Since 1990 until present ===
After Lithuania regained independence on March 11, 1990 the state funding of filmmaking drastically decreased and smaller studios emerged instead. During the era about 10 documentaries and 2 feature films have been made yearly. The most notable directors have been Vytautas Žalakevičius, the director of Žvėris išeinantis is jūros (The Beast Emerging from the Sea) (1992), and Algimantas Puipa the winner of the Ecumenical Jury Prize at Lübeck Nordic Film Days and the winner of the Grand Jury Prize at the Rouen Nordic Film Festival for Vilko dantų karoliai (A Wolf Teeth Necklace) (1997).

After the restoration of the independence, Šarūnas Bartas, Audrius Stonys, Arūnas Matelis, Audrius Juzėnas, Algimantas Puipa, Janina Lapinskaitė, Dijana and her husband Kornelijus Matuzevičius received success in international movie festivals. A documentary film by Arūnas Matelis Wonderful Losers: A Different World has been shown in numerous film festivals in Europe and Asia and recognized with multiple awards.

The most internationally known film director of Lithuanian descent born in Chicago, Illinois, United States is Robert Zemeckis.

In 2011 Vilnius Film Cluster was established. Vilnius Film Cluster is an alliance which unites 31 leading audiovisual company and one of the largest universities in Lithuania. Vilnius Film Cluster basis was used for Netflix and HBO TV serials production.

In January 2014 Lithuanian Film Tax Incentive came into effect as a new policy measure to foster local and foreign film production in Lithuania. In 2016 the Lithuanian Film Centre issued 29 certificates representing a total of 1,850,646 EUR rebates. The tax incentive was increased from 20% to 30% in 2019.

Lithuanian film industry experiencing a renaissance over the last decade. The audience for Lithuanian films has reached 23% in 2015, compared with 2.48% in 2012. 21 national films were premiered in 2018. In 2018, 54 new films of various lengths and genres were created, 28 of them were feature films most of them supported by the Lithuanian Film Centre. In 2018, Lithuanian films had 27,9 percent of the domestic market share.

Lithuania has hosted numerous major international productions in recent years, including HBO's Chernobyl, HBO´s Beforeigners , Catherine the Great, BBC's War and Peace, Netflix's Tokyo Trial, Stranger Things 4th season, Young Wallander, Clark TVNorge's The Oil Fund, Swedish TV series Hamilton, Danish film Erna i krig, a film by Norwegian director Hans Petter Moland Out Stealing Horses and many more. Sometimes 5 to 6 different international crews executing filming in Lithuania at the same time.

In 2025 The Southern Chronicles became the highest grossing film in the country's cinema history.

== Actors ==
- Regimantas Adomaitis
- Donatas Banionis
- Ingeborga Dapkūnaitė (Seven Years in Tibet)
- Aurelija Mikušauskaitė
- Antanas Škėma
- Aistė Diržiūtė

Actors of Lithuanian descent:

- Laurence Harvey
- Charles Bronson
- Jacques Sernas
- George Mikell
- Ruta Lee
- Jason Sudeikis

== Directors ==
- Arūnas Matelis
- Šarūnas Bartas
- Artūras Barysas
- Romas Lileikis
- Adolfas Mekas
- Jonas Mekas
- Algimantas Puipa
- Donatas Ulvydas
- Emilija Škarnulytė
- Jonas Vaitkus
- Emilis Vėlyvis
- Vytautas Žalakevičius

== Awards ==
- Sidabrinė gervė (Silver Crane)

== Festivals ==
- AXX
- Ciaba Film Festival
- Kaunas International Film Festival
- Kino pavasaris

== Acclaimed Lithuanian films ==
=== Occupied Lithuania (1940–1990) ===
Title	Translation	Year	Genre
Žydrasis horizontas	The Blue Horizon	1957	
Adomas nori būti žmogumi	Adam Wants to Be a Man	1959	
Paskutinė atostogų diena	The Girl and the Echo	1964	
Niekas nenorėjo mirti	Nobody Wanted to Die	1965	historical drama
Jausmai	Feelings	1968	historical drama
Kai aš mažas buvau	When I Was a Child	1968	
Gražuolė	The Beautiful Girl	1969	
Maža išpažintis	A Small Confession	1971	
Herkus Mantas	Herkus Mantas	1972	historical drama
Velnio nuotaka	Devil's Bride	1973	musical
Perskeltas dangus	Shattered Skies	1974	drama
Sadūto Tūto	Sadūto Tūto	1974	drama
Virto ąžuolai	The Fall of Oak Trees	1976	drama
Mano vaikystės ruduo	The Autumn of My Childhood	1977	romantic drama
Riešutų duona	Walnut Bread	1978	tragicomedy
Faktas	Fact	1981	psychological thriller
Skrydis per Atlantą	The Flight Across the Atlantic	1983	historic documentary
Mano mažytė žmona	My Little Wife	1984	romantic drama
Kažkas atsitiko	Something Has Happened	1986	music documentary
Amžinoji šviesa	Eternal Light	1987	drama
Neatmenu tavo veido	I Don't Remember Your Face	1988	

=== Lithuania (1990–present) ===
Title	Translation	Year	Genre
Trys dienos	Three Days	1991	
Vilko dantų karoliai	A Wolf Teeth Necklace	1997	
Elzė iš Gilijos	Elze's Life	2000	
Vienui vieni	Utterly Alone	2004	historic drama
Prieš parskrendant į žemę	Before Flying Back to the Earth	2005	documentary
Dievų miškas	Forest of the Gods	2005	historic drama
Zero. Alyvinė Lietuva	Zero: Lilac Lithuania	2006	action comedy
Anastasija	Anastasia	2006	historic drama
Aš esu tu	You Am I	2006	romantic drama
Jėzus iš Lietuvos	Jesus from Lithuania	2006	drama
Nuodėmės užkalbėjimas	Whisper of Sin	2007	romantic drama
Nereikalingi žmonės	Loss	2008	psychological thriller
Zero II	Zero II	2010	action comedy
Atsisveikinimas (laimingo žmogaus istorija)	Farewell	2010	drama
Tadas Blinda. Pradžia	Tadas Blinda: The Beginning	2011	action and adventure
Mes už... Lietuvą!	We're for... Lithuania!	2011	documentary
Aurora	Aurora	2011	fantasy drama
Kita svajonių komanda	The Other Dream Team	2012	documentary
Kaip pavogti žmoną	How to Steal a Wife	2013	comedy
Ekskursantė	The Excursionist	2013	historical drama
Redirected. Už Lietuvą	Redirected	2014	action comedy
Pelėdų kalnas	Owl Mountain	2018	historical drama
Piktųjų karta	Generation of Evil	2022	crime thriller

== See also ==
- List of cinema of the world
- World cinema
