= Sidabrinė gervė 2010 =

Lithuanian film awards ceremony

- Date: 28 May 2010
- Location: Vilnius
- Country: Lithuania
- Hosted by: Ramūnas Rudokas, Gražina Balandytė

Television/radio coverage
- Network: Lietuvos televizija

Sidabrinė gervė 2010 was the 3rd film award ceremony established by Lithuanian Cinema Academy. The ceremnony show was held in capital city of Vilnius on 28 May 2010.

== Commission ==
In commission which selected winners was 7 members.

- Gražina Arlickaitė, humanitarian sciences doctor, European Cinema Academy member
- Arūnas Matelis – directors, European Cinema Academy member, winner of Lithuanian National Prize
- Živilė Pipinytė – cinema critic
- Rasa Paukštytė – cinema critic
- Viktoras Radzevičius – operator, international film festivals wiiner *
- Ignas Miškinis–cinema and TV directors, „Sidabrinės gervė“ past winner
- Gintaras Sodeika – compositor, „Auksinis kryžius“ winner.

== Winners and nominees ==
At the 2010 ceremony 41 films were nominated

=== Best film ===
- Zero II (by Emilis Vėlyvis)
- Atsisveikinimas (by Tomas Donela)
- Eurazijos aborigenas (by Šarūnas Bartas)

=== Best short film ===
- Lernavan (by Marat Sargsyan)
- Jau puiku, tik dar šiek tiek... (by Lina Lužytė)
- Aš tave žinau (by Dovilė Šarutytė)

=== Best documentary film ===
- Šarūnas Bartas - vienas lauke karys (by Guillaume Coudray)
- Upė (by Julija Gruodienė, Rimantas Gruodis)
- Tikras garsas Valstybės atgimimo 1989-1993 (by Domantas Vildžiūnas)

=== Best TV film ===
- Naisių vasara (by Saulius Balandis)
- Svetimi (by Sigitas Račkys)
- Amžini jausmai (by Alvydas Šlepikas)

=== Best animated film ===
- Luce (by Rasa Joni)
- Tiulis (by Darius Jaruševičius, Ina Šilina)
- Lietuvių vardas (by Nijolė Valadkevičiūtė)

=== Best director ===
- Šarūnas Bartas
- Emilis Vėlyvis
- Julija Gruodienė and Rimantas Gruodis

=== Best male actor ===
- Ramūnas Rudokas and Kęstutis Jakštas ("Zero II")
- Dainius Kazlauskas ("Atsisveikinimas")
- Juozas Budraitis ("Tėve mūsų")

=== Best female actor ===
- Klavdija Koršunova ("Eurazijos aborigenas")
- Julija Steponaitytė ("Aš tave žinau")
- Gabija Ryškuvienė ("Jau puiku, tik dar šiek tiek...")

=== Best supporting actor male ===
- Albinas Keleris ("Atsisveikinimas")
- Marius Repšys ("Bergenas")
- Petras Lisauskas ("Stiklainis uogienės")

=== Best supporting actor female ===
- Rimantė Valiukaitė ('Jau puiku, tik dar šiek tiek...")
- Dalia Storyk ("Atsisveikinimas")
- Inga Jankauskaitė ("Zero II")

=== Best scenario ===
- Dovilė Šarutytė ("Aš tave žinau")
- Lina Lužytė ("Jau puiku, tik dar šiek tiek...")
- Emilis Vėlyvis, Jonas Banys, Aidas Puklevičius ("Zero II")

=== Best operator ===
- Feliksas Abrukauskas ("Jau puiku, tik dar šiek tiek...", "Gerumo sparnai")
- Vilius Mačiulskis ("Lernavan")
- Linas Dabriška ("Laisvas kritimas")

=== Best compositor ===
- Kipras Mašanauskas ("Atsisveikinimas")
- Happyendless ("Zero II")
- Rokas Eltermanas ("Laisvas kritimas")

=== Best professional job ===
- Jonas Maksvytis
- "Skalvija"
- Asta Liukaitytė

=== Best student film ===
- Sinchronizacija (by Rimas Sakalauskas)
- Bomba (by Saulius Leonavičius)
- Kryžiažodis (by Ieva Veiverytė)

=== Special award ===
"Auksinė gervė" (golden crane) of merits for Lithuanian cinema:

- Arūnas Žebriūnas (director)
