= Mantas Jankavičius =

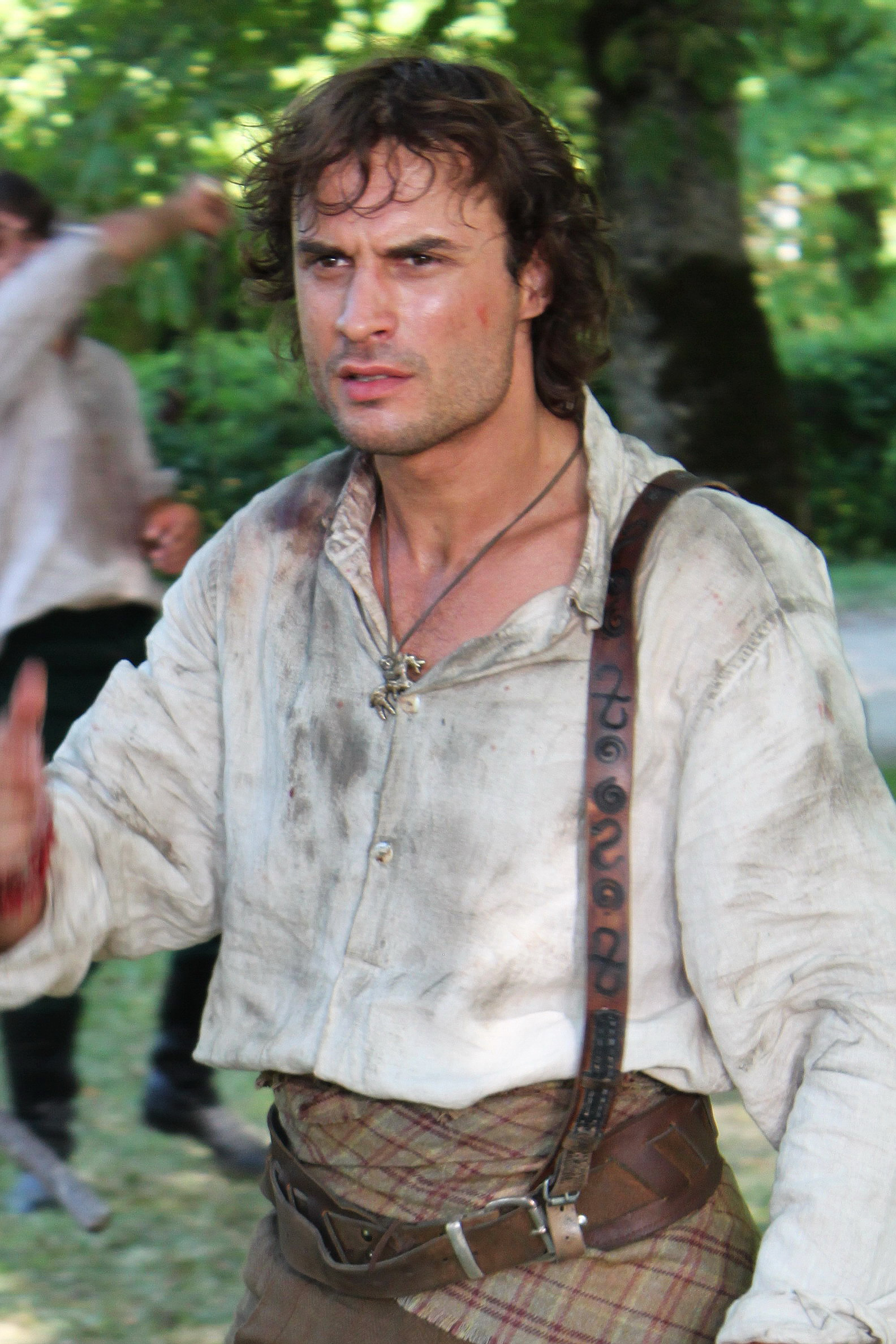
- Mantas Jankavičus during filming Tadas Blinda Pradžia

Background information
- Born: 20 May 1980 (age 46)
- Origin: Vilnius, Lithuania
- Genres: Pop, Pop-Rock, R&B, Dance Pop
- Occupations: Singer, actor
- Years active: 2001–present

Mantas Jankavičius (born 20 May 1980) is a Lithuanian singer and actor.

== Biography ==
Born in Vilnius, he later moved with his parents to Kėdainiai. With 13 years, he started singing Kėdainiai rock band "Silence Zone". At the age of 19 years, he returned to Vilnius and joined in the Vilnius Conservatory, where he learned to play trombone. At the same-time he was an active singer in a band called La "Vita" and released an album with them. After the departure of one of the members, he decided to start a solo career. In 2001, he participated in the competition Fizz Superstar, which was held in Lithuania, Latvia and Estonia, and he reached the finals. After the contest he gained attention from several Estonian producers, offering to collaborate. He then recorded a number of tracks. Later noted Tabami goes ... "concerts, which embodied the Freddie Mercury and Robbie Williams. Cast musicals: "Love and Death in Verona - Romeo, Notre Dame - Quasimodo.

In 2010 Mantas debuted in cinema, in movie "Tadas Blinda Pradžia".

== Personal life ==
He has wife Ieva and has two sons, Benas (born 2007) and Herkus (born 2011).

== Discography ==
- Gyvenam kartą (2007)

== Filmography ==
Year	Film	Role	Notes
2011	Tadas Blinda Pradžia	Tadas Blinda	Cinema debut, lead role
2013	Single Valentine		Supporting role
