= TV3 (Lithuanian TV channel) =

- Logo used since December 1, 2019
- Country: Lithuania
- Broadcast area: Lithuania
- Headquarters: P. Lukšio g. 23, LT-09132 Vilnius, Lithuania

Programming
- Picture format: 576i SDTV; 1080i HDTV

Ownership
- Owner: Providence Equity Partners
- Sister channels: TV6; TV8; TV3 Plus; Go3 Sport; Go3 Films

History
- Launched: 11 April 1993; 33 years ago

Links
- Webcast: TV3 on TV3 Play
- Website: tv.tv3.lt

TV3 Lithuania (TV trys) is a Lithuanian free-to-air television channel that was launched on 11 April 1993. It was owned by Modern Times Group (MTG) until 2017, when it was acquired by Providence Equity Partners for €115 million. The broadcaster is UAB All Media Lithuania.

== Broadcasting ==
- TV3 Lithuania is transmitted through digital terrestrial television. TV3, as with other channels of the Media Baltics group in the Baltic States, switched to HD broadcasting on 26 July 2018.
- The channel can also be seen via cable, satellite, IPTV or TV3 Play.

== History ==
- TV3 Lithuania first started broadcasting in 1992 as TELE-3.
- In 1996, the company filed for bankruptcy, as it was in debts. Then Modern Times Group (MTG) saved the company by paying out all of the debts.
- In 1997, TELE-3 programmes became broadcast as TV3 programmes.
- In 2017, MTG sold all of their TV channels and radio stations to Providence Equity Partners.

== Programming ==
Programs telecasted on TV3 include Medikopteris, Krepšinio namai, Bir Zamanlar Cukurova, Disegnando tu amor, Gelbėtojai išgelbėtojai, Mano meilė karantinas and Gero Vakaro Šou. Routine programming includes movies and lifestyle shows, as well as reality and news programs. The channel broadcasts the Lithuanian version of The X Factor.

Shows and series
Original name	Origin
Sturm Der Liebe	Germany
Bir Zamanlar Cukurova	Turkey
VIVA TOP 100	Germany
Disegnando tu amor	Mexico
Kirik Hayatlar	Turkey
Bitva extrasensov	Russia
Деффчонки	Russia
Krepšinio namai	Lithuania
Mano meilė karantinas (Comedy)	Lithuania
Gelbėtojai išgelbėtojai (Comedy)	Lithuania
Tobula Kopija	Lithuania
Lidl Grilio Talentai	Lithuania
Maisto Kelias	Lithuania
Skaniai ir Paprastai	Lithuania
Gero Vakaro Šou	Lithuania
Lithuania's Got Talent	Lithuania
X Faktorius	Lithuania
TV Pagalba	Lithuania
Moterys Meluoja Geriau	Lithuania
Farai	Lithuania

Films
Original name	Origin
Immenhof - Das Abenteuer eines Sommers	Germany
À fond	France
Coconut the Little Dragon 2: Into the Jungle!	Germany
Les nouvelles aventures d'Aladin	France
Valentinas Vienas	Lithuania
Kartą kaime	Lithuania
O vánocní hvezde	Czech Republic

=== Sports ===
==== Basketball ====
- 2019 FIBA Basketball World Cup qualification
- 2019 FIBA Basketball World Cup
- EuroBasket 2021 qualification
- EuroBasket 2022
- 2023 FIBA Basketball World Cup qualification
- 2023 FIBA Basketball World Cup
- Lithuania national basketball team fixtures

==== Olympic Games ====
- 2018 Winter Olympics
- 2020 Summer Olympics
- 2022 Winter Olympics
- 2024 Summer Olympics

== Logos ==
TV3 logo used until 2009

TV3 logo (2009–2013)

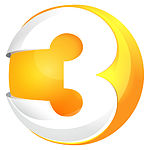
TV3 logo (2013–2019)

TV3 logo (2019–present)

== See also ==
- List of Lithuanian television channels
