= Antanas Šurna =

Lithuanian actor

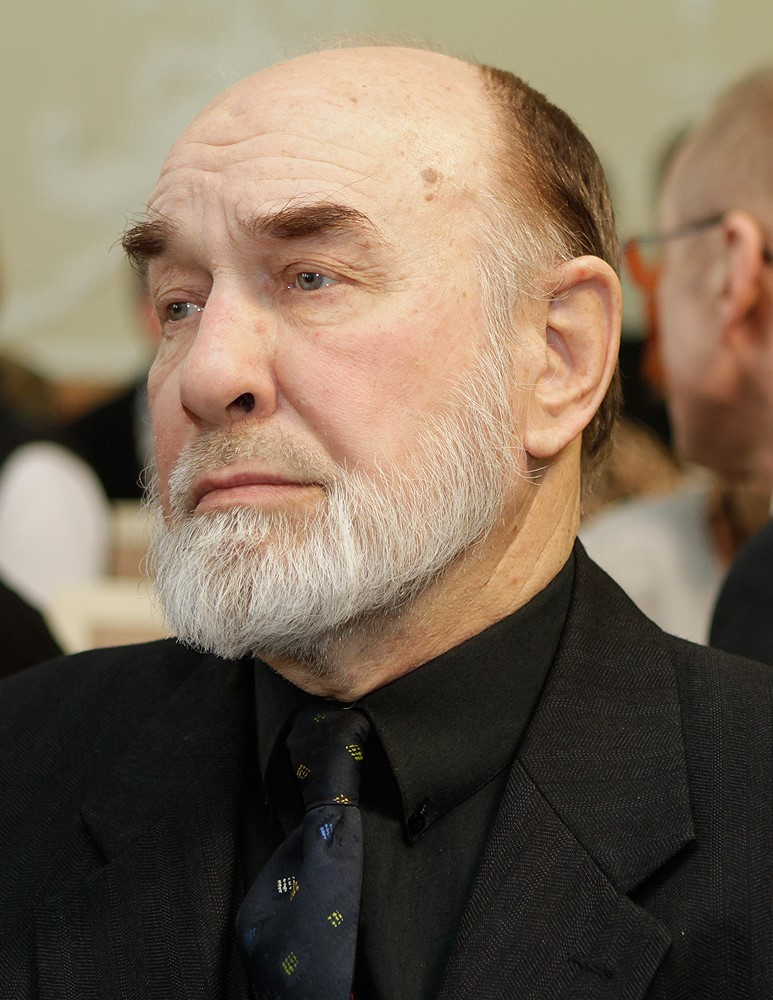
- Šurna in 2010
- Born: Antanas Šurna; 27 March 1939 (age 87); Kaunas, Lithuania
- Died: 19 May 2014 (aged 75); Vilnius, Lithuania
- Occupation: Actor
- Years active: 1963–2014
- Works: Filmography, theatre
- Spouse: Birutė Šurnienė
- Children: 2

Antanas Šurna (pronounced [ɐntaːnɐs ɕʊrˈnɐ]; 27 March 1939 – 19 May 2014) was a Lithuanian stage and movie actor. He has appeared in over 100 movies and 50 plays. He is thought to be one of the most successful actors in Lithuania. His career began during the late 1960s. He won many awards during his 40-year career.

Šurna died suddenly from cardiac arrest in Vilnius, Lithuania, aged 75.

== Filmography ==
Year	Title			Role
Year	Original		In English	Role
1963	Vienos dienos kronika		One Day Chronicle	Rimša (in his youth)
1965	Niekas nenorėjo mirti		Nobody Wanted to Die	Secretary
1969	Да будет жизнь	Da budet zhizn	Ave vita	Einas
1970	Мужское лето	Muzhskoye leto	Summer of Men	Monk
1971	Žaizdos žemės mūsų		The Wounds of Our Land	Giedraitis
1972	Herkus Mantas		Herkus Monte	Herkus Mantas
1974	Perskeltas dangus		The Split Sky	Steponas Kreivėnas
1975	Atpildo diena		The Day of Retribution	Mykolas
1976	Sodybų tuštėjimo metas		The Time of Empty Homesteads	Marius Nemunis 'Raudonasis Marius'
1977	Riešutų duona		Walnut Bread	Kaminskas
1977	Пыль под солнцем	Pyl pod solntsem	Dust Under the Sun	Marius
1980	Mažos mūsų nuodemės		Our Little Sins	Leonas Ulba
1980	Kelionė į rojų		Journey to Heaven	Gendarme
1982	Раненая тишина	Ranenaya tishina	Morning Silence	Cibiras
1982	Berniūkščiai		The Boys	Commissar Pyotr Andreyevich
1983	Женщина и четверо её мужчин	Zhenshchina i chetvero eyo muzhchin	The Woman and Her Four Men	Father
1986	Benjaminas Kordušas			Benjaminas Kordušas
1990	Žalčio žvilgsnis		A Glance of the Serpent	Bandit Gontas
2000	Elzė iš Gilijos		Elze's Life	Grünbaum
2008	Pilotas		The Pilot	Professor
2008	Defiance			Orthodox Rabbi
2011	Tadas Blinda. Pradžia		Tadas Blinda. The Beginning	Rittmeister Snegiryov
