= Owl Mountain =

- Directed by: Audrius Juzėnas
- Written by: Pranas Morkus
- Produced by: Norbertas Pranckus, Justina Ragauskaitė
- Starring: Arnas Danusas; Aidas Jurgaitis; Paulina Taujanskaitė; Mantas Zemleckas; Rūta Šmergelytė; Adomas Jasiukėnas; Aleksas Kazanavičius; Aldona Bendoriūtė; Darius Meškauskas; Aleksandr Špilevoj; Aleksandra Metalnikova; Monika Bičiūnaitė; Dainius Svobonas; Anastasija Marčenkaitė
- Cinematography: Rolandas Leonavičius
- Music by: Titas Petrikis
- Release date: 16 February 2018
- Running time: 128 minutes
- Country: Lithuania
- Language: Lithuanian

Owl Mountain (Pelėdų kalnas) is a 2017 Lithuanian historical drama feature film directed by Audrius Juzėnas. The film portrays political and historical events between 1947-1953 in Lithuania, when the Lithuanian population conducted guerrilla warfare against the Soviet authorities that occupied the country in an attempt to gain independence. The Soviet authorities reacted to the Lithuanian partisans by arresting and deporting several to Siberia, whilst killing others.

The film shows the lives of some young people from wealthy Kaunas families, from their studies in an independent Lithuania before going through war and occupation. They were forced to choose to emigrate from Lithuania, to join partisans in resisting the Soviets or to adapt.

The film was supported by Lithuanian movies center and released on a symbolic date – February 16, 2018 - for the 100th anniversary of the Act of Independence of Lithuania.

== Filming ==
The film was shot in various historical locations of Kaunas town and their surroundings such as Owl Mountain, Kaunas Winter Port of Inland Waters, Lithuanian Zoo, Botanical Garden, and various museums and churches.

== Cast ==
• Aidas Jurgaitis – Tadas

• Rūta Šmergelytė – Aldona

• Arnas Danusas – Šmelingas (partisan)

• Darius Meškauskas – Russian soldier

• Paulina Taujanskaitė – Rita

• Aleksandra Metalnikova – Lidija (wife of Russian soldier)

• Aleksas Kazanavičius – Serapinas (Father of Tadas)

• Anastasija Marčenkaitė – Silvija

• Aldona Bendoriūtė – Serapinienė (Mother of Tadas)

• Monika Bičiūnaitė – Jadvyga

• Mantas Zemleckas – Kovas (leader of partisans)

• Adomas Jasiukėnas – Velička

• Dainius Svobonas – Karlas Hansas Rosmanas (German soldier)

• Aleksandr Špilevoj – Skardžius

== Release ==
The film was released on February 16, 2018 to coincide with the 100th anniversary of the Act of Independence of Lithuania. It was able to reach 5th place at the box office
