= Vytautas Šapranauskas =

Lithuanian actor

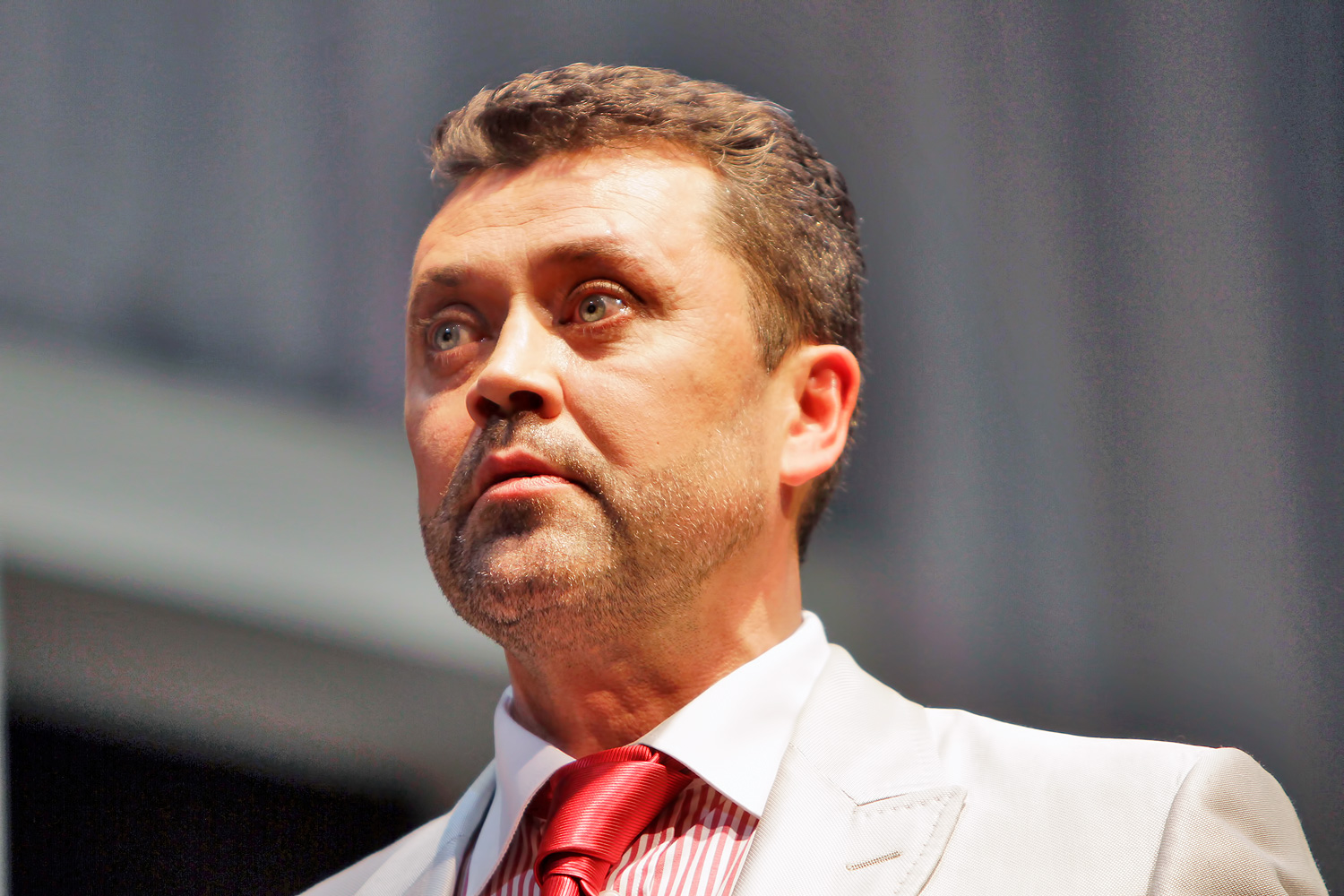
- Born: 19 April 1958; Vilnius, Lithuanian SSR, USSR
- Died: 18 April 2013 (aged 54); Vilnius, Lithuania
- Occupations: Comedian, actor

Vytautas Šapranauskas (19 April 1958 – 18 April 2013) was a Lithuanian comedy and drama actor of theatre and cinema, and an anchor of TV programs. According to the chairman of the Lithuanian Union of Actors, he was one of Lithuania's most talented actors, both in comedy and drama. In 1980, he graduated from the Lithuanian Academy of Music and Theatre. Until 1990, he was affiliated with the Russian Drama Theatre, and from 1990 he was with the Vilnius Small Theatre.

He acted in a number of films, both during the Soviet times and in independent Lithuania.

Later he was a TV host and a jury member of a number of TV shows, such as Lithuania's Got Talent, X Faktorius, and Clash of the Choirs. He appeared in the film Redirected, a Lithuanian-British gangster action-comedy film. The film features four friends turned first–time robbers who get stranded in Eastern Europe and have to find their way back home. The film premiered in Lithuania on 10 January 2014 and was released in the United Kingdom on 13 November 2014. The film was dedicated to Vytautas Šapranauskas.

== Death ==
I will never fully open to anyone. Even to the dearest ones. Everyone has to keep their secrets, have something for oneself. For who? For yourself! If you give away everything then who are you? Why do you need insides, skin on the surface which hides something? When you talk to people, if it's compulsory, you put on a mask and its the only thing that will save you. For me its easy. But if I don't want to wear a mask, I leave. I think we all wear masks, every one of us.

— Vytautas Šapranauskas

He committed suicide just before his 55th birthday. Before killing himself, he texted several friends about his intentions, but nobody believed him, knowing him as a comedian.

== Filmography ==
Year	Title	Role	Notes
1981	Medaus menuo Amerikoje	Young man	Uncredited
2005	Vilniaus getas	Weiskopf	
2010	Zero 2	Kesha	
2013	Single Valentine	Valentinas	
2014	Redirected	Algis	Released posthumously
