= X Faktorius =

Lithuanian television series

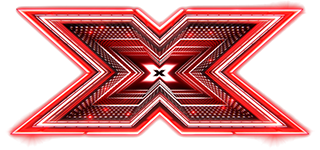
- Created by: Simon Cowell
- Directed by: Mindaugas Meškauskas
- Presented by: Marijonas Mikutavičius (2012–2013); Martynas Starkus (2013–2017); Mindaugas Stasiulis (2017–present) Mindaugas Rainys (2017–present)
- Judges: Saulius Prūsaitis (2012–present); Saulius Urbonavičius (2012–present); Vytautas Šapranauskas (2012–2013); Rūta Ščiogolevaitė (2012–2015); Marijonas Mikutavičius (2013–present); Justė Arlauskaitė (2015–present); Andrius Mamontovas (2017)
- Country of origin: Lithuania
- Original language: Lithuanian
- No. of seasons: 11

Production
- Producer: Saulius Urbonavičius
- Running time: 45–130 minutes

Original release
- Network: TV3
- Release: 14 October 2012 – present

Related
- The X Factor (UK ) Other international versions

X Faktorius is the Lithuanian version of The X Factor, a series originating from the United Kingdom. Based on the original UK show, the concept of the series is to find new singing talent (solo or groups) contested by aspiring singers drawn from public auditions. The series first aired on 14 October 2012.

== Series summary ==
To date, eleven series have been broadcast, as summarised below.

Contestant in "Saulius Prūsaitis"
Contestant in "Saulius Urbonavičius"
Contestant in "Rūta Ščiogolevaitė"
Contestant in "Vytautas Šapranauskas"
Contestant in "Marijonas Mikutavičius"
Contestant in "Justina Arlauskaité-Jazzu"
Contestant in "Andrius Mamotovas"

Series	Start	Finish	Winner	Runner-up	Third place	Fourth place	Winning mentor	Main host	Main judges
1	14 October 2012	17 February 2013	Giedrė Vokietytė	RSP	Aleksandra Metalnikova	Ugnė Valinčiūtė	Saulius Urbonavičius	Marijonas Mikutavičius	Saulius Prūsaitis; Saulius Urbonavičius-Samas; Vytautas Šapranauskas; Rūta Ščiogolevaitė
2	29 September 2013	2 February 2014	Žygimantas Gečas	Andžela Adamovič	Audrius Petrauskas	Ieva Ščerbinskaitė	Rūta Ščiogolevaitė	Martynas Starkus	Saulius Prūsaitis; Saulius Urbonavičius-Samas; Rūta Ščiogolevaitė; Marijonas Mikutavičius
3	4 October 2015	15 February 2016	Monika Pundziūtė	Aleksas Augaitis	Thomas Tumosa	Marija Beržė	Justina Arlauskaitė-Jazzu	Martynas Starkus	Saulius Prūsaitis; Saulius Urbonavičius-Samas; Marijonas Mikutavičius; Justina Arlauskaitė-Jazzu
4	4 September 2016	15 January 2017	Iglė Bernotaitytė	Golden Age	Paulina Paulauskaitė	Mindaugas Avižienis	Saulius Prūsaitis	Martynas Starkus	Saulius Prūsaitis; Saulius Urbonavičius-Samas; Marijonas Mikutavičius; Justina Arlauskaitė-Jazzu
5	24 September 2017	11 February 2018	120	Monika Juškevičiūtė	Justė Baradulinaitė	Alen Chicco	Marijonas Mikutavičius	Mindaugas Rainys & Mindaugas Stasiulis	Saulius Prūsaitis; Saulius Urbonavičius-Samas; Marijonas Mikutavičius; Justina Arlauskaitė-Jazzu; Andrius Mamontovas
6	16 September 2018	3 February 2019	Good Time Boys	Rimvydas Matukynas	Kristina Jurevičiūtė	Lukas Zažeckis	Saulius Prūsaitis	Mindaugas Rainys & Mindaugas Stasiulis	Saulius Prūsaitis; Saulius Urbonavičius-Samas; Marijonas Mikutavičius; Justina Arlauskaitė-Jazzu
7	8 September 2019	29 December 2019	Milda Martinkėnaitė	Martyna Jezepčikaitė	Titas & Benas	Norbert Liatkovski	Marijonas Mikutavičius	Mindaugas Rainys & Mindaugas Stasiulis	Saulius Prūsaitis; Saulius Urbonavičius-Samas; Marijonas Mikutavičius; Justina Arlauskaitė-Jazzu
8	6 September 2020	15 November 2020	Milita Daikerytė	Deimantė Vaičiūtė-Dejmukas	Giedrius Leškevičius	Twosome	Justina Arlauskaitė-Jazzu	Mindaugas Rainys & Mindaugas Stasiulis	Saulius Prūsaitis; Saulius Urbonavičius-Samas; Marijonas Mikutavičius; Justina Arlauskaitė-Jazzu
9	5 September 2021	26 December 2021	Mando	Lukrecija Vasiliauskaitė	Gvidas Ropė	Gabija Aleknavičiūtė	Saulius Prūsaitis	Mindaugas Rainys & Mindaugas Stasiulis	Saulius Prūsaitis; Saulius Urbonavičius-Samas; Marijonas Mikutavičius; Justina Arlauskaitė-Jazzu
10	25 September 2022	25 December 2022	Spurr	Vytautė Gaižauskaitė	Demian Shyian	Domantas Rolis	Saulius Prūsaitis	Mindaugas Rainys & Mindaugas Stasiulis	Saulius Prūsaitis; Saulius Urbonavičius-Samas; Marijonas Mikutavičius; Justina Arlauskaitė-Jazzu
11	8 September 2024	22 December 2024	Atėnė Ravinkaitė	Vytautė Tamutytė	Kartu		Saulius Prūsaitis	Mindaugas Rainys & Mindaugas Stasiulis	Saulius Prūsaitis; Saulius Urbonavičius-Samas; Marijonas Mikutavičius; Justina Arlauskaitė-Jazzu

== Judges' categories and their contestants ==
In each series, each judge is allocated a category to mentor and chooses three acts to progress to the live finals. This table shows, for each series, which category each judge was allocated and which acts he or she put through to the live finals.

Key:

– Winning judge/category. Winners are in bold, eliminated contestants in small font.

Series	Saulius Prūsaitis	Saulius Urbonavičius-Samas	Vytautas Šapranauskas	Rūta Ščiogolevaitė	N/A
1	**Groups**; RSP; 4 Roses; Roxy 5	**Girls**; **Giedrė Vokietytė**; Ugnė Valinčiūtė; Kristina Radžiukynaitė	**Boys**; Martynas Kavaliauskas; Nojus Bartaška; Petras Daunys	**Over 25s** Aleksandra Metalnikova; Saulius Šivickas; Justas Ašmantas	N/A
Series	Saulius Prūsaitis	Saulius Urbonavičius-Samas	Marijonas Mikutavičius	Rūta Ščiogolevaitė	N/A
2	**Girls**; Ieva Ščerbinskaitė; Neringa Gailiušaitė; Vaiva Kalinauskaitė	**Groups**; Žemaitukai; Benjamins; Sesės	**Over 25s** Andžela Adamovič; Skaistė Kurnuševičiūtė; Egidijus Žižiūnas	**Boys**; **Žygimantas Gečas**; Audrius Petrauskas; Dovydas Buršteinas	N/A
Series	Saulius Prūsaitis	Saulius Urbonavičius-Samas	Marijonas Mikutavičius	Justina Arlauskaitė-Jazzu	N/A
3	**Boys**; Aleksas Augaitis; Thomas Tumosa; Jonatanas Kazlauskas; Rihards Bērziņš	**Groups**; Original Copy; KA/VA; ZetaBeat; Ellse	**Over 25s** Marija Beržė; Domas Česnulevičius; Erika Astrauskaitė Poškienė; Paulius Jonikas	**Girls**; **Monika Pundziūtė**; Miglė Pivoriūnaitė; Odilija Murauskaitė; Justė Gaižauskaitė	N/A
4	**Girls**; **Iglė Bernotaitytė**; Paulina Paulauskaitė; Ieva Voverytė; Marija Grabštaitė	**Over 25s** Simona Klusienė; Andis Griva; Artūras Balandinas; Edgaras Morkevičius	**Groups**; Golden Age; Only Once; ZetaBeat; Strėlės	**Boys**; Mindaugas Avižienis; Paulius Drabulis; Deividas Valma; Algirdas Daumantas Ciūnys	N/A
Series	Saulius Prūsaitis	Saulius Urbonavičius-Samas	Marijonas Mikutavičius	Justina Arlauskaitė-Jazzu	Andrius Mamontovas
5	**Over 25s** Monika Juškevičiūtė; Alen Chicco; Augustė Žičkutė	**Boys**; Deividas Valma; Mantas Sakalauskas; Marius Mickus	**Groups**; **120**; Lukrecija & Vakaris; EMDŽEJ	**Girls**; Justė Baradulinaitė; Iveta Svilainytė; Dovilė Rimkevičiūtė	**Underdogs**; Danas Berlinskas; Indrė Grikšelytė; Evolution
Series	Saulius Prūsaitis	Saulius Urbonavičius-Samas	Marijonas Mikutavičius	Justina Arlauskaitė-Jazzu	N/A
6	**Groups**; **Good Time Boys**; Rokas & Laurynas; Intervalai; Senimo Beatas	**Girls**; Ugnė Audzevičiūtė; Elzė Borsteikaitė; Emilija Misiūnaitė; Rūta Budreckaitė; Meda Borisaitė	**Boys**; Rimvydas Matukynas; Lukas Zažeckis; Silvestras Belte; Renaldas Malinauskas	**Over 25s** Kristina Jurevičiūtė; Lukas Jonaitis; Daviti Adamashvili; Milda Martinkėnaitė	N/A
7	**Teens**; Martyna Jezepčikaitė; Mykolas Kuan Keys; Vytautė Gaižauskaitė	**Groups**; Titas & Benas; Jett Star; Nice	**Over 25s** **Milda Martinkėnaitė**; Paulius Mscichauskas; Alna Katinaitė	**Young Adults**; Norbert Liatkovski; Gerda Zaptoriūtė; Jolanta Labinskytė	N/A
8	**Boys**; Ainis Storpirštis; Gian Luca Demarco; Gediminas Gabalis-Vėjas	**Groups**; Twosome; RSA; Marius Repšys & Inga Šepetkaitė	**Seniors**; Giedrius Leškevičius; Lina Rastokaitė; Jokūbas Bareikis	**Girls**; **Milita Daikerytė**; Deimantė Vaičiūtė-Dejmukas; Austėja Lukaitė; Julija Žižė	N/A
9	**Groups**; **Mando**; Aquarium de Clara; Bloom	**Teens**; Lukrecija Vasiliauskaitė; Airidija Belorazaitė; Nojus Žebrauskas	**Over 25s** Lijana Stakauskaitė; Povilas Žilionis; Alika Keene	**Young Adults**; Gvidas Ropė; Gabija Aleknavičiūtė; Marija Gevorkjan	N/A
10	**Groups**; **Spurr**; Sankaba; Midnight Gents & Gabrea	**Young Adults**; Domantas Rolis; Gabrielė Kalniškytė; Arnas Pelakauskas	**Teens**; Vytautė Gaižauskaitė; Demian Shyian; Elvija Zvicevičiūtė	**Over 25s** Jausmė Elena Stonkutė; Dovydas Misiūnas; Karolis Mačėnas	N/A
11	**Atėnė Ravinkaitė**; Vytautė Tamutytė; Aleksandras Stankevičius	Kartu; Viltė Kirstukaitė; Justė Osh	Korniha; Miglė Malkevičiūtė; Grizlo	Monika Švilpaitė; Gabriela Ždanovičiūtė; Gintare Zenkevičiutė	N/A

== Season 1 ==
=== Contestants ===
Key:

– Winner
– Runner-up
– Third Place

Category (mentor)	Acts		
Boys (Šapranauskas)	Nojus Bartaška	Petras Daunys	Martynas Kavaliauskas
Girls (Urbonavičius)	Kristina Radžiukynaitė	Ugnė Valinčiūtė	Giedrė Vokietytė
Over 25s (Ščiogolevaitė)	Justas Ašmantas	Aleksandra Metalnikova	Saulius Šivickas
Groups (Prūsaitis)	4 Roses	Roxy 5	RSP

=== Live shows ===
The live shows started on 16 December 2012. Each week, the contestants perform and the voting lines open after the performances. When the results are announced, the bottom two contestants perform another song of their choice (the final showdown) and then judges choose which of the two to eliminate. If the judges' votes are tied, the vote goes to deadlock and the contestant with the fewest public votes that night is eliminated.

Each week while the voting is still in progress, there is a group performance by the remaining contestants or a musical performance from a guest (or a judge). Judge Saulius Prūsaitis performed on the first show with his group Happyendless, while the second one featured two group performances: one by the boys category and another without the boys. In week 3, Rūta Ščiogolevaitė sang "Run To You" and then "Proud Mary" duet with Kristina Radžiukynaitė, who was eliminated the previous week. KeyMono performed several songs the following week, while there was a group performance before the individual performances in week 5. Then the remaining contestants performed another one with presenter Marijonas Mikutavičius during the voting and Povilas Meškėla appeared on the sixth show with his group Rojaus Tūzai. Vaidas Baumila, a former contestant on the 2005 Lithuanian music competition "Dangus" performed the following week. He sang "'Til I Hear You Sing" from the Love Never Dies musical and then his own song called "Ieškok Manęs".

=== Results summary ===
Colour key

–	Contestant did not perform or face the public vote
–	Contestant was in the bottom two and had to sing again in the final showdown
–	Contestant received the fewest public votes and was immediately eliminated (no final showdown)
–	Contestant received the most public votes

Weekly results per contestant
Contestant	Week 1	Week 2	Week 3	Week 4	Week 5	Week 6	Week 7	Week 8	Week 9	Week 10	
Contestant	Week 1	Week 2	Week 3	Week 4	Week 5	Week 6	Week 7	Week 8	Week 9	Round 1^{3}	Round 2
Giedrė Vokietytė	8th 5.80%	6th 7.65%	9th 6.11%	2nd 14.51%	2nd 15.41%	1st 28.01%	1st 22.07%	1st 25.45%	3rd 23.17%	Safe	Winner; 50.23%^{4}
RSP	4th 8.83%	4th 10,49%	1st 21.02%	1st^{1} 24.94%	3rd^{1} 14.73%	2nd^{1} 19.56%	2nd 19.73%	4th 16.84%	2nd 31.91%	Safe	Runner-up; 32.08%^{4}
Aleksandra Metalnikova	5th 7.70%	7th 7.28%	5th 8.12%	5th 8.73%	5th 11.51%	5th 11.71%	3rd 17.69%	3rd 19.19%	1st 32.20%	3rd	Eliminated (week 10)
Ugnė Valinčiūtė	1st 20.40%	9th 5.15%	4th 9.03%	7th 7.48%	4th 13.31%	—N/a^{2}	6th 10.15%	2nd 23.14%	4th 12.71%	Eliminated (week 9)	
4 Roses	10th 5.14%	8th 6.46%	7th 6.36%	8th 7.34%	7th 8.65%	3rd 16.32%	4th 16.73%	5th 15.37%	Eliminated (week 8)		
Martynas Kavaliauskas	2nd 15.73%	1st 18.99%	2nd 19.96%	3rd 12.51%	1st 18.14%	4th 15.33%	5th 13.62%	Eliminated (week 7)			
Saulius Šivickas	6th 7.42%	10th 4.92%	3rd 10.34%	4th 10.74%	6th 10.70%	6th 9.06%	Eliminated (week 6)				
Roxy 5	7th 5.80%	5th 7.87%	8th 6.32%	6th 7.55%	8th 7.56%	Eliminated (week 5)					
Nojus Bartaška	3rd 12.18%	3rd 11.40%	6th 7.05%	9th 6.21%	Eliminated (week 4)						
Petras Daunys	12th 2.64%	2nd 14.96%	10th 5.70%	Eliminated (week 3)							
Kristina Radžiukynaitė	9th 5.16%	11th 4.81%	Eliminated (week 2)								
Justas Ašmantas	11th 3.14%	Eliminated (week 1)									
Final showdown	Justas Ašmantas, Petras Daunys	Kristina Radžiukynaitė, Saulius Šivickas	Giedrė Vokietytė, Petras Daunys	4 Roses, Nojus Bartaška	4 Roses, Roxy 5	Aleksandra Metalnikova, Saulius Šivickas	Martynas Kavaliauskas, Ugnė Valinčiūtė	4 Roses, RSP	No final showdown or judges' vote: results are based on public votes alone		
Judges voted to:	Eliminate								No final showdown or judges' vote: results are based on public votes alone		
Prūsaitis's vote	Justas Ašmantas	Saulius Šivickas	Petras Daunys	Nojus Bartaška	4 Roses	Saulius Šivickas	Martynas Kavaliauskas	RSP	No final showdown or judges' vote: results are based on public votes alone		
Urbonavičius's vote	Justas Ašmantas	Saulius Šivickas	Petras Daunys	4 Roses	Roxy 5	Saulius Šivickas	Martynas Kavaliauskas	4 Roses	No final showdown or judges' vote: results are based on public votes alone		
Ščiogolevaitė's vote	Petras Daunys	Kristina Radžiukynaitė	Petras Daunys	Nojus Bartaška	Roxy 5	Saulius Šivickas	Martynas Kavaliauskas	RSP	No final showdown or judges' vote: results are based on public votes alone		
Šapranauskas's vote	Justas Ašmantas	Kristina Radžiukynaitė	Giedrė Vokietytė	4 Roses	4 Roses	Saulius Šivickas	Ugnė Valinčiūtė	4 Roses	No final showdown or judges' vote: results are based on public votes alone		
Eliminated	Justas Ašmantas; 3 of 4 votes Majority	Kristina Radžiukynaitė; 2 of 4 votes Deadlock	Petras Daunys; 3 or 4 votes Majority	Nojus Bartaška; 2 of 4 votes Deadlock	Roxy 5; 2 of 4 votes Deadlock	Saulius Šivickas; 4 of 4 votes Majority	Martynas Kavaliauskas; 3 or 4 votes Majority	4 Roses; 2 of 4 votes Deadlock	Ugnė Valinčiūtė; 12.71% to save	Aleksandra Metalnikova; Public vote to win	RSP; 32.08% to win

- ^1 Viktorija Vyšniauskaitė, a member of RSP, had vocal cord surgery and was absent from the group in weeks four and five. She returned to the competition in the second performance in week six.
- ^2 Valinčiūtė was absent in week six due to illness.
- ^3 After the elimination of Aleksandra Metalnikova, only her vote count was displayed and votes for the remaining two finalists were counted onwards.
- ^4 The voting percentages in week 10 for the second round do not add up to 100%, owing to the freezing of votes. Aleksandra Metalnikova received 17.68% of the final vote.

== Season 2 ==
=== Contestants ===
Key:

– Winner
– Runner-up
– Third Place

Category (mentor)	Acts		
Boys (Ščiogolevaitė)	Dovydas Buršteinas	Žygimantas Gečas	Audrius Petrauskas
Girls (Prūsaitis)	Neringa Gailiušaitė	Vaiva Kalinauskaitė	Ieva Ščerbinskaitė
Over 25s (Mikutavičius)	Andžela Adamovič	Skaistė Kurnuševičiūtė	Egidijus Žižiūnas
Groups (Urbonavičius)	Benjamins	Sesės	Žemaitukai

=== Results summary ===
Colour key

–	Contestant was in the bottom two and had to sing again in the final showdown
–	Contestant received the fewest public votes and was immediately eliminated (no final showdown)
–	Contestant received the most public votes

Weekly results per contestant
Contestant	Week 1	Week 2	Week 3	Week 4	Week 5	Week 6	Week 7	Week 8	Week 9	Week 10
Žygimantas Gečas	5th 8.74%	7th 7.15%	6th 9.30%	6th 8.74%	3rd 14.02%	2nd 18.43%	2nd 20.46%	1st 29.25%	1st 31.78%	Winner; 47.17%
Andžela Adamovič	1st 23.59%	1st 16.64%	4th 11.97%	4th 11.60%	1st 20.13%	3rd 13.28%	4th 11.78%	3rd 19.00%	3rd 22.39%	Runner-Up; 35.72%
Audrius Petrauskas	3rd 11.73%	2nd 15.01%	5th 11.66%	2nd 15.87%	5th 11.51%	6th 9.30%	3rd 12.13%	4th 17.59%	2nd 24.90%	3rd 17.11%
Ieva Ščerbinskaitė	8th 4.41%	5th 10.96%	3rd 12.07%	8th 7.34%	2nd 14.20%	1st 28.33%	1st 34.47%	2nd 19.28%	4th 20.93%	Eliminated (week 9)
Skaistė Kurnuševičiūtė	7th 5.60%	4th 11.61%	1st 17.74%	3rd 14.00%	4th 12.63%	4th 13.04%	6th 9.56%	5th 14.89%	Eliminated (week 8)	
Žemaitukai	4th 11.12%	6th 9.06%	7th 8.74%	5th 10.34%	6th 10.81%	5th 12.08%	5th 11.60%	Eliminated (week 7)		
Neringa Gailiušaitė	10th 3.24%	10th 3.50%	9th 4.61%	7th 8.15%	8th 6.66%	7th 5.53%	Eliminated (week 6)			
Egidijus Žižiūnas	2nd 16.50%	3rd 11.89%	2nd 14.24%	1st 16.83%	7th 10.04%	Eliminated (week 5)				
Benjamins	9th 3.58%	9th 4.19%	8th 5.30%	9th 7.15%	Eliminated (week 4)					
Sesės	6th 7.54%	8th 6.56%	10th 4.37%	Eliminated (week 3)						
Vaiva Kalinauskaitė	11th 2.36%	11th 3.44%	Eliminated (week 2)							
Dovydas Buršteinas	12th 1.59%	Eliminated (week 1)								

== Season 3 ==
=== Contestants ===
Key:

– Winner
– Runner-up
– Third Place

Category (mentor)	Acts			
Boys (Prūsaitis)	Aleksas Augaitis	Rihards Bērziņš	Jonatanas Kazlauskas	Thomas Tumosa
Girls (Jazzu)	Justė Gaižauskaitė	Odilija Murauskaitė	Miglė Pivoriūnaitė	Monika Pundziūtė
Over 25s (Mikutavičius)	Erika Astrauskaitė Poškienė	Marija Beržė	Domas Česnulevičius	Paulius Jonikas
Groups (Urbonavičius)	Ellse	KA/VA	Original Copy	ZetaBeat

=== Results summary ===
Colour key

–	Contestant was in the bottom two or three and had to sing again in the final showdown
–	Contestant was in the bottom two or three but was immediately eliminated
–	Contestant received the most public votes

Weekly results per contestant
Contestant	Week 1	Week 2	Week 3	Week 4	Week 5	Week 6	Week 7	Week 8	Week 9	Week 10
Monika Pundziūtė	2nd 16.20%	3rd 12.39%	1st 18.62%	2nd 20.77%	1st 21.08%	2nd 17.74%	1st 20.09%	1st 23.11%	2nd 31.35%	Winner; 48.87%
Aleksas Augaitis	1st 19.16%	2nd 12.77%	2nd 14.87%	3rd 11.32%	3rd 13.57%	1st 20.30%	5th 10.63%	2nd 18.45%	1st 35.55%	Runner-Up; 37.14%
Thomas Tumosa	6th 4.78%	6th 5.13%	5th 7.31%	10th 2.76%	5th 8.34%	5th 10.48%	2nd 18.33%	6th 9.56%	3rd 12.72%	Eliminated; 13.98%
Marija Beržė	9th 3.22%	8th 3.65%	10th 4.98%	6th 5.39%	10th 4.50%	8th 6.74%	3rd 14.25%	4th 12.09%	4th 11.07%	Eliminated (week 9)
Miglė Pivoriūnaitė	5th 8.01%	5th 7.10%	7th 6.66%	5th 5.89%	8th 6.75%	6th 8.45%	7th 7.90%	3rd 16.43%	5th 9.30%	Eliminated (week 9)
Domas Česnulevičius	4th 10.90%	1st 31.41%	3rd 12.65%	4th 7.79%	4th 9.27%	3rd 11.28%	4th 12.56%	5th 10.82%	Eliminated (week 8)	
Original Copy	10th 3.13%	7th 3.71%	9th 5.48%	7th 5.22%	7th 7.21%	7th 7.62%	6th 9.18%	7th 9.54%	Eliminated (week 8)	
Jonatanas Kazlauskas	3rd 14.75%	4th 7.98%	4th 11.84%	1st 30.16%	2nd 16.52%	4th 10.71%	8th 7.07%	Eliminated (week 7)		
Erika Astrauskaitė Poškienė	7th 4.72%	10th 3.11%	8th 5.53%	8th 4.25%	6th 7.74%	9th 6.68%	Eliminated (week 6)			
Paulius Jonikas	8th 3.35%	12th 2.58%	6th 6.94%	9th 4.08%	9th 5.02%	Eliminated (week 5)				
KA/VA	13th 1.85%	11th 2.88%	11th 2.73%	11th 2.36%	Eliminated (week 4)					
ZetaBeat	14th 1.76%	9th 3.58%	12th 2.41%	Eliminated (week 3)						
Odilija Murauskaitė	11th 2.72%	13th 2.12%	Eliminated (week 2)							
Rihards Bērziņš	12th 2.43%	14th 1.61%	Eliminated (week 2)							
Ellse	15th 1.65%	Eliminated (week 1)								
Justė Gaižauskaitė	16th 1.39%	Eliminated (week 1)								

== Season 4 ==
=== Contestants ===
Key:

– Winner
– Runner-up
– Third Place

Category (mentor)	Acts			
Boys (Jazzu)	Mindaugas Avižienis	Algirdas Daumantas Ciūnys	Paulius Drabulis	Deividas Valma
Girls (Prūsaitis)	Iglė Bernotaitytė	Marija Grabštaitė	Paulina Paulauskaitė	Ieva Voverytė
Over 25s (Urbonavičius)	Artūras Balandinas	Andis Griva	Simona Klusienė	Edgaras Morkevičius
Groups (Mikutavičius)	Golden Age	Only Once	Strėlės	ZetaBeat

=== Results summary ===
Colour key

–	Contestant was in the bottom two or three and had to sing again in the final showdown
–	Contestant was in the bottom two or three but was immediately eliminated
–	Contestant received the most public votes

Weekly results per contestant
Contestant	Week 1	Week 2	Week 3	Week 4	Week 5	Week 6	Week 7	Week 8	Week 9
Iglė Bernotaitytė	Safe	Safe	Safe	Safe	6th	Safe	1st	3rd	Winner
Golden Age	Safe	Safe	Safe	1st	Safe	1st	Safe	2nd	Runner-Up
Paulina Paulauskaitė	Safe	Safe	Safe	Safe	Safe	5th	4th	1st	Eliminated
Mindaugas Avižienis	1st	Safe	1st	Safe	Safe	Safe	Safe	4th	Eliminated (week 8)
Simona Klusienė	Safe	1st	Safe	Safe	Safe	Safe	5th	Eliminated (week 7)	
Paulius Drabulis	Safe	Safe	Safe	8th	1st	6th	Eliminated (week 6)		
Andis Griva	Safe	Safe	Safe	Safe	7th	Eliminated (week 5)			
Only Once	Safe	Safe	Safe	Safe	8th	Eliminated (week 5)			
ZetaBeat	Safe	Safe	11th	9th	Eliminated (week 4)				
Ieva Voverytė	Safe	12th	Safe	10th	Eliminated (week 4)				
Deividas Valma	Safe	Safe	10th	Eliminated (week 3)					
Algirdas Daumantas Ciūnys	Safe	Safe	12th	Eliminated (week 3)					
Marija Grabštaitė	Safe	13th	Eliminated (week 2)						
Artūras Balandinas	14th	14th	Eliminated (week 2)						
Edgaras Morkevičius	15th	Eliminated (week 1)							
Strėlės	16th	Eliminated (week 1)							

== Season 5 ==
=== Contestants ===
Key:

– Winner
– Runner-up
– Third Place

Category (mentor)	Acts		
Boys (Urbonavičius)	Marius Mickus	Mantas Sakalauskas	Deividas Valma
Girls (Jazzu)	Justė Baradulinaitė	Dovilė Rimkevičiūtė	Iveta Svilainytė
Over 25s (Prūsaitis)	Alen Chicco	Monika Juškevičiūtė	Augustė Žičkutė
Groups (Mikutavičius)	120	EMDŽEJ	Lukrecija & Vakaris
Underdogs (Mamontovas)	Danas Berlinskas	Evolution	Indrė Grikšelytė

=== Results summary ===
Colour key

–	Contestant was in the bottom two or three and had to sing again in the final showdown
–	Contestant was in the bottom two or three but was immediately eliminated
–	Contestant received the most public votes

Weekly results per contestant
Contestant	Week 1	Week 2	Week 3	Week 4	Week 5	Week 6	Week 7	Week 8	Week 9
120	4th (9,92%)	2nd (13,45%)	1st (14,96%)	1st (20,82%)	3rd (14,93%)	3rd (15,75%)	1st (32,93%)	1st (27,86%)	Winner (42,87%)
Monika Juškevičiūtė	2nd (13,45%)	1st (13,49%)	6th (9,20%)	2nd (16,71%)	2nd (19,67%)	2nd (19,41%)	2nd (22,79%)	3rd (24,34%)	Runner-Up (38,94%)
Justė Baradulinaitė	6th (7,11%)	6th (7,85%)	5th (10,54%)	6th (8,19%)	4th (12,57%)	5th (14,43%)	3rd (19,05%)	2nd (27,80%)	Eliminated (18,19%)
Alen Chicco	1st (17,78%)	3rd (11,92%)	7th (8,66%)	5th (8,90%)	1st (24,34%)	1st (21,71%)	4th (16,55%)	4th (20,00%)	Eliminated (week 8)
Augustė Žičkutė	9th (4,66%)	9th (4,76%)	2nd (14,30%)	7th (7,87%)	7th (8,69%)	4th (14,58%)	5th (8,67%)	Eliminated (week 7)	
Danas Berlinskas	5th (9,34%)	4th (11,56%)	4th (11,79%)	4th (11,90%)	5th (11,30%)	6th (14,01%)	Eliminated (week 6)		
Deividas Valma	13th (2,69%)	5th (10,09%)	4th (10,73%)	3rd (13,35%)	6th (8,88%)	Eliminated (week 5)			
Indrė Grikšelytė	10th (3,67%)	8th (4,91%)	10th (3,99%)	8th (6,34%)	Eliminated (week 4)				
Lukrecija & Vakaris	3rd (11,30%)	7th (7,20%)	8th (6,59%)	9th (5,92%)	Eliminated (week 4)				
Iveta Svilainytė	7th (5,09%)	10th (4,68%)	9th (5,42%)	Eliminated (week 3)					
EMDŽEJ	8th (4,72%)	12th (3,52%)	11th (3,86%)	Eliminated (week 3)					
Evolution	11th (3,55%)	11th (4,23%)	Eliminated (week 2)						
Mantas Sakalauskas	12th (3,04%)	13th (2,35%)	Eliminated (week 2)						
Marius Mickus	14th (2,16%)	Eliminated (week 1)							
Dovilė Rimkevičiūtė	15th (1,53%)	Eliminated (week 1)							

== Season 6 ==
=== Contestants ===
Key:

– Winner
– Runner-up
– Third Place

Category (mentor)	Acts				
Boys (Mikutavičius)	Silvestras Beltė	Renaldas Malinauskas	Rimvydas Matukynas	Lukas Zažeckis	
Girls (Urbonavičius)	Ugnė Audzevičiūtė	Meda Borisaitė	Elzė Borsteikaitė	Rūta Budreckaitė	Emilija Misiūnaitė
Over 25s (Jazzu)	Daviti Adamashvili	Lukas Jonaitis	Kristina Jurevičiūtė	Milda Martinkėnaitė	
Groups (Prūsaitis)	Good Time Boys	Intervalai	Rokas & Laurynas	Senimo Beatas	

=== Results summary ===
Colour key

–	Contestant was in the bottom two or three and had to sing again in the final showdown
–	Contestant was in the bottom two or three but was immediately eliminated
–	Contestant received the most public votes

Weekly results per contestant
Contestant	Week 1	Week 2	Week 3	Week 4	Week 5	Week 6	Week 7	Week 8	Week 9
Good Time Boys	10th (5,89%)	9th (5,69%)	9th (6,31%)	1st (16,24%)	1st (22,77%)	1st (27,03%)	1st (32,05%)	1st (39,03%)	Winner (57,83%)
Rimvydas Matukynas	13th (4,50%)	14th (3,98%)	2nd (11,56%)	6th (7,27%)	2nd (13,51%)	3rd (13,57%)	4th (13,17%)	2nd (25,98%)	Runner-Up (24,78%)
Kristina Jurevičiūtė	3rd (8,53%)	2nd (11,01%)	5th (7,46%)	2nd (14,32%)	3rd (12,61%)	4th (11,61%)	2nd (30,49%)	3rd (21,29%)	Eliminated (17,39%)
Lukas Zažeckis	1st (14,10%)	1st (13,38%)	1st (12,87%)	3rd (11,20%)	5th (11,10%)	2nd (17,44%)	3rd (13,94%)	4th (13,74%)	Eliminated (week 8)
Rokas & Laurynas	9th (6,15%)	7th (6,55%)	4th (8,98%)	5th (8,28%)	4th (11,47%)	5th (10,81%)	5th (10,37%)	Eliminated (week 7)	
Lukas Jonaitis	4th (7,45%)	3rd (8,87%)	8th (6,82%)	4th (10,56%)	7th (6,72%)	6th (10,67%)	Eliminated (week 6)		
Ugnė Audzevičiūtė	15th (3,40%)	4th (7,46%)	7th (7,09%)	8th (6,96%)	6th (9,97%)	7th (8,87%)	Eliminated (week 6)		
Elzė Borsteikaitė	11th (5,21%)	10th (5,68%)	6th (7,37%)	9th (6,24%)	8th (6,47%)	Eliminated (week 5)			
Daviti Adamashvili	12th (4,58%)	12th (4,67%)	10th (5,89%)	7th (7,09%)	9th (5,37%)	Eliminated (week 5)			
Silvestras Beltė	7th (6,54%)	11th (4,98%)	3rd (9,75%)	10th (6,00%)	Eliminated (week 4)				
Intervalai	14th (3,95%)	5th (6,78%)	11th (5,53%)	11th (5,85%)	Eliminated (week 4)				
Renaldas Malinauskas	8th (6,24%)	8th (5,85%)	12th (5,27%)	Eliminated (week 3)					
Milda Martinkėnaitė	5th (6,66%)	6th (6,72%)	13th (5,11%)	Eliminated (week 3)					
Emilija Misiūnaitė	6th (6,62%)	13th (4,45%)	Eliminated (week 2)						
Rūta Budreckaitė	2nd (8,98%)	15th (3,96%)	Eliminated (week 2)						
Meda Borisaitė	16th (3,11%)	Eliminated (week 1)							
Senimo Beatas	17th (1,50%)	Eliminated (week 1)							

== Season 7 ==
=== Contestants ===
Key:

– Winner
– Runner-up
– Third Place

Category (mentor)	Acts		
Teens (Prūsaitis)	Vytautė Gaižauskaitė	Martyna Jezepčikaitė	Mykolas Kuan Keys
Young Adults (Jazzu)	Jolanta Labinskytė	Norbert Liatkovski	Gerda Zaptoriūtė
Over 25s (Mikutavičius)	Alna Katinaitė	Milda Martinkėnaitė	Paulius Mscichauskas
Groups (Urbonavičius)	Jett Star	Nice	Titas & Benas

=== Results summary ===
Colour key

–	Contestant was in the bottom two or three and had to sing again in the final showdown
–	Contestant was in the bottom two or three but was immediately eliminated
–	Contestant received the most public votes

Weekly results per contestant
Contestant	Week 1	Week 2	Week 3	Week 4	Week 5	Week 6
Milda Martinkėnaitė	5th (9,32%)	6th (8,74%)	2nd (15,57%)	4th (12,91%)	1st (38,45%)	Winner (43,94%)
Martyna Jezepčikaitė	3rd (9,92%)	1st (19,12%)	1st (17,24%)	1st (25,77%)	2nd (27,03%)	Runner-Up (36,62%)
Titas & Benas	2nd (14,12%)	2nd (14,57%)	5th (13,01%)	2nd (23,71%)	3rd (20,50%)	Eliminated (19,44%)
Norbert Liatkovski	6th (7,48%)	5th (10,02%)	3rd (13,52%)	3rd (15,33%)	4th (14,02%)	Eliminated (week 5)
Gerda Zaptoriūtė	1st (24,47%)	2nd (14,48%)	4th (13,07%)	5th (12,49%)	Eliminated (week 4)	
Jolanta Labinskytė	9th (4,64%)	9th (5,32%)	6th (10,69%)	6th (9,79%)	Eliminated (week 4)	
Jett Star	10th (4,13%)	7th (6,14%)	7th (10,11%)	Eliminated (week 3)		
Paulius Mscichauskas	4th (9,74%)	4th (10,89%)	8th (6,79%)	Eliminated (week 3)		
Nice	8th (4,95%)	8th (5,66%)	Eliminated (week 2)			
Alna Katinaitė	7th (5,75%)	10th (5,06%)	Eliminated (week 2)			
Mykolas Kuan Keys	11th (2,79%)	Eliminated (week 1)				
Vytautė Gaižauskaitė	12th (2,69%)	Eliminated (week 1)				

== Season 8 ==
For this series, the show was changed into a celebrity version titled X Faktorius Žvaigždės.

=== Contestants ===
Key:

– Winner
– Runner-up
– Third Place
– Withdrew

Category (mentor)	Acts			
Boys (Prūsaitis)	Gian Luca Demarco	Gediminas Gabalis-Vėjas	Ainis Storpirštis	
Girls (Jazzu)	Milita Daikerytė	Austėja Lukaitė	Deimantė Vaičiūtė-Dejmukas	Julija Žižė
Seniors (Mikutavičius)	Jokūbas Bareikis^{1}	Giedrius Leškevičius	Lina Rastokaitė	
Groups (Urbonavičius)	Marius Repšys & Inga Šepetkaitė	RSA	Twosome	

=== Results summary ===
Colour key

–	Contestant was in the bottom two or three and had to sing again in the final showdown
–	Contestant was in the bottom two or three but was immediately eliminated
–	Contestant received the fewest public votes and was immediately eliminated (no final showdown)
–	Contestant received the most public votes
–	Contestant was given a Gold Seat from the judges

Weekly results per contestant
Contestant	Week 1	Week 2	Week 3	Week 4	Week 5	
Contestant	Week 1	Week 2	Week 3	Week 4	Round 1	Round 2
Milita Daikerytė	1st (21,69%)	1st (13,59%)	1st (27,90%)	Gold; Seat	1st (43,88%)	Winner (43,88%)
Deimantė Vaičiūtė-Dejmukas	2nd (14,21%)	2nd (12,92%)	2nd (12,66%)	3rd (14,87%)	2nd (15,97%)	Runner-Up (15,97%)
Giedrius Leškevičius	8th (8,81%)	8th (7,48%)	4th (11,35%)	Gold; Seat	3rd (14,96%)	3rd (14,96%)
Twosome	3rd (11,35%)	5th (10,12%)	5th (11,03%)	1st (24,85%)	4th (13,90%)	4th (13,90%)
Ainis Storpirštis	Gold; Seat	4th (10,72%)	7th (8,97%)	2nd (21,95%)	5th (6,19%)	Eliminated (week 5)
Gian Luca Demarco	6th (8,65%)	6th (8,99%)	3rd (12,39%)	5th (12,62%)	6th (5,09%)	Eliminated (week 5)
RSA	4th (9,26%)	9th (6,71%)	Gold; Seat	4th (14,41%)	Eliminated (week 4)	
Austėja Lukaitė	7th (7,34%)	7th (8,06%)	6th (9,00%)	6th (11,30%)	Eliminated (week 4)	
Lina Rastokaitė	5th (9,11%)	3rd (12,08%)	8th (6,70%)	Eliminated (week 3)		
Gediminas Gabalis-Vėjas	9th (4,44%)	10th (5,03%)	Eliminated (week 2)			
Marius Repšys & Inga Šepetkaitė	11th (1,81%)	11th (4,29%)	Eliminated (week 2)			
Jokūbas Bareikis	10th (3,79%)	Withdrew (week 2)				
Julija Žižė	12th (1,55%)	Eliminated (week 1)				

- ^1 Jokūbas Bareikis withdrew from the competition due to needing to self-isolate after being in close contact with someone with COVID-19.

== Season 9 ==
=== Contestants ===
Key:

– Winner
– Runner-up
– Third Place

Category (mentor)	Acts		
Teens (Urbonavičius)	Airidija Belorazaitė	Lukrecija Vasiliauskaitė	Nojus Žebrauskas
Young Adults (Jazzu)	Gabija Aleknavičiūtė	Marija Gevorkjan	Gvidas Ropė
Over 25s (Mikutavičius)	Alika Keene	Lijana Stakauskaitė	Povilas Žilionis
Groups (Prūsaitis)	Aquarium de Clara	Bloom	Mando

=== Results summary ===
Colour key

–	Contestant was in the bottom two and had to sing again in the final showdown
–	Contestant received the fewest public votes and was immediately eliminated (no final showdown)
–	Contestant received the most public votes

Weekly results per contestant
Contestant	Week 1	Week 2	Week 3	Week 4	Week 5	Week 6	Week 7	Week 8	
Contestant	Week 1	Week 2	Week 3	Week 4	Week 5	Week 6	Week 7	Round 1	Round 2
Mando	1st	1st	1st	1st	1st	1st	1st	1st	Winner
Lukrecija Vasiliauskaitė	11th	Safe	Safe	Safe	Safe	Safe	5th	Safe	Runner-Up
Gvidas Ropė	Safe	10th	Safe	Safe	Safe	Safe	Safe	Safe	3rd
Gabija Aleknavičiūtė	Safe	Safe	Safe	Safe	Safe	Safe	Safe	4th	Eliminated (week 8)
Aquarium de Clara	Safe	Safe	Safe	Safe	Safe	6th	Safe	5th	Eliminated (week 8)
Bloom	Safe	Safe	Safe	Safe	8th	Safe	6th	Eliminated (week 7)	
Airidija Belorazaitė	Safe	Safe	Safe	Safe	Safe	7th	Eliminated (week 6)		
Lijana Stakauskaitė	Safe	Safe	Safe	9th	7th	Eliminated (week 5)			
Povilas Žilionis	Safe	Safe	9th	8th	Eliminated (week 4)				
Alika Keene	Safe	Safe	10th	Eliminated (week 3)					
Nojus Žebrauskas	Safe	11th	Eliminated (week 2)						
Marija Gevorkjan	12th	Eliminated (week 1)							

== Season 10 ==
=== Contestants ===
Key:

– Winner
– Runner-up
– Third Place

Category (mentor)	Acts		
Teens (Mikutavičius)	Vytautė Gaižauskaitė	Demian Shyian	Elvija Zvicevičiūtė
Young Adults (Urbonavičius)	Gabrielė Kalniškytė	Arnas Pelakauskas	Domantas Rolis
Over 25s (Jazzu)	Karolis Mačėnas	Dovydas Misiūnas	Jausmė Elena Stonkutė
Groups (Prūsaitis)	Midnight Gents & Gabrea	Sankaba	Spurr

=== Results summary ===
Colour key

–	Contestant was in the bottom two or three and had to sing again in the final showdown
–	Contestant was in the bottom two or three but was immediately eliminated
–	Contestant received the fewest public votes and was immediately eliminated (no final showdown)
–	Contestant received the most public votes

Weekly results per contestant
Contestant	Week 1	Week 2	Week 3	Week 4	Week 5	
Contestant	Week 1	Week 2	Week 3	Week 4	Round 1	Round 2
Spurr	Safe	1st	Safe	Safe	1st	Winner
Vytautė Gaižauskaitė	10th	Safe	Safe	1st	Safe	Runner-up
Demian Shyian	Safe	8th	1st	Safe	Safe	3rd Place
Domantas Rolis	Safe	Safe	Safe	Safe	4th	Eliminated (week 5)
Jausmė Elena Stonkutė	Safe	Safe	Safe	6th	5th	Eliminated (week 5)
Dovydas Misiūnas	Safe	Safe	6th	5th	Eliminated (week 4)	
Elvija Zvicevičiūtė	Safe	Safe	7th	Eliminated (week 3)		
Gabrielė Kalniškytė	1st	Safe	8th	Eliminated (week 3)		
Arnas Pelakauskas	Safe	9th	Eliminated (week 2)			
Karolis Mačėnas	Safe	10th	Eliminated (week 2)			
Sankaba	11th	Eliminated (week 1)				
Midnight Gents & Gabrea	12th	Eliminated (week 1)				

== Season 11 ==
=== Contestants ===
Key:

– Winner
– Runner-up
– Third Place

Mentor	Acts		
Saulius Prūsaitis	Atėnė Ravinkaitė	Aleksandras Stankevičius	Vytautė Tamutytė
Saulius Urbonavičius-Samas	Kartu	Viltė Kirstukaitė	Justė Osh
Marijonas Mikutavičius	Grizlo	Korniha	Miglė Malkevičiūtė
Justina Arlauskaitė-Jazzu	Monika Švilpaitė	Gabriela Ždanovičiūtė	Gintare Zenkevičiutė

=== Results summary ===
Colour key

–	Contestant was in the bottom two or three and had to sing again in the final showdown
–	Contestant was in the bottom two or three but was immediately eliminated
–	Contestant received the fewest public votes and was immediately eliminated (no final showdown)
–	Contestant received the most public votes

Weekly results per contestant
Contestant	Week 1	Week 2	Week 3	Week 4	
Contestant	Week 1	Week 2	Week 3	Round 1	Round 2
Atėnė Ravinkaitė	Safe	Safe	Bottom three	1st	Winner
Vytautė Tamutytė	Safe	Safe	1st	Safe	Runner-Up
Kartu	1st	Safe	Safe	Safe	3rd
Viltė Kirstukaitė	Safe	1st	Safe	4th - 6th	Eliminated (week 4)
Korniha	Safe	Safe	Safe	4th - 6th	Eliminated (week 4)
Monika Švilpaitė	Safe	8th	Safe	4th - 6th	Eliminated (week 4)
Gabriela Ždanovičiūtė	Safe	Safe	Bottom three	Eliminated (week 3)	
Miglė Malkevičiūtė	Safe	Safe	8th	Eliminated (week 3)	
Gintare Zenkevičiutė	Safe	9th	Eliminated (week 2)		
Justė Osh	Bottom three	10th	Eliminated (week 2)		
Aleksandras Stankevičius	Bottom three	Eliminated (week 1)			
Grizlo	12th	Eliminated (week 1)			
