= Kostas Smoriginas =

Lithuanian actor and musician (1953–2025)

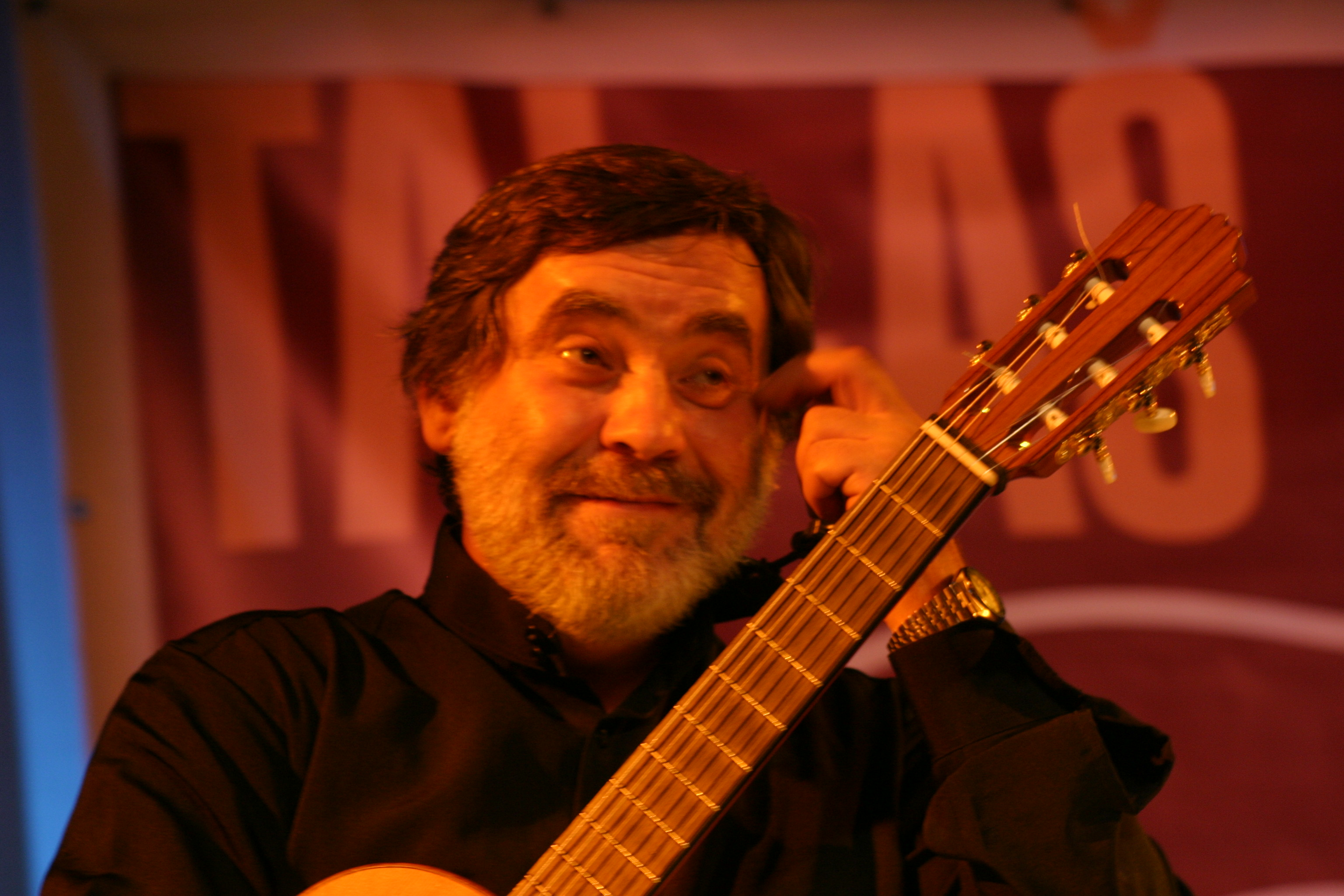
- Smoriginas in 2004
- Born: 22 April 1953; Kaunas, Lithuanian SSR, USSR
- Died: 29 October 2025 (aged 72); Vilnius, Lithuania
- Occupation: Actor
- Years active: 1976–2025

Kostas Smoriginas (22 April 1953 – 29 October 2025) was a Lithuanian stage and film actor and musician.

Between 1995 and 1998, Smoriginas and actors Saulius Bareikis and Olegas Ditkovskis, toured and recorded as the musical group Aktorių trio (Actors' Trio). From the 2000s he performed solo.

Smoriginas died in Vilnius on 29 October 2025, at the age of 72.

== Filmography ==
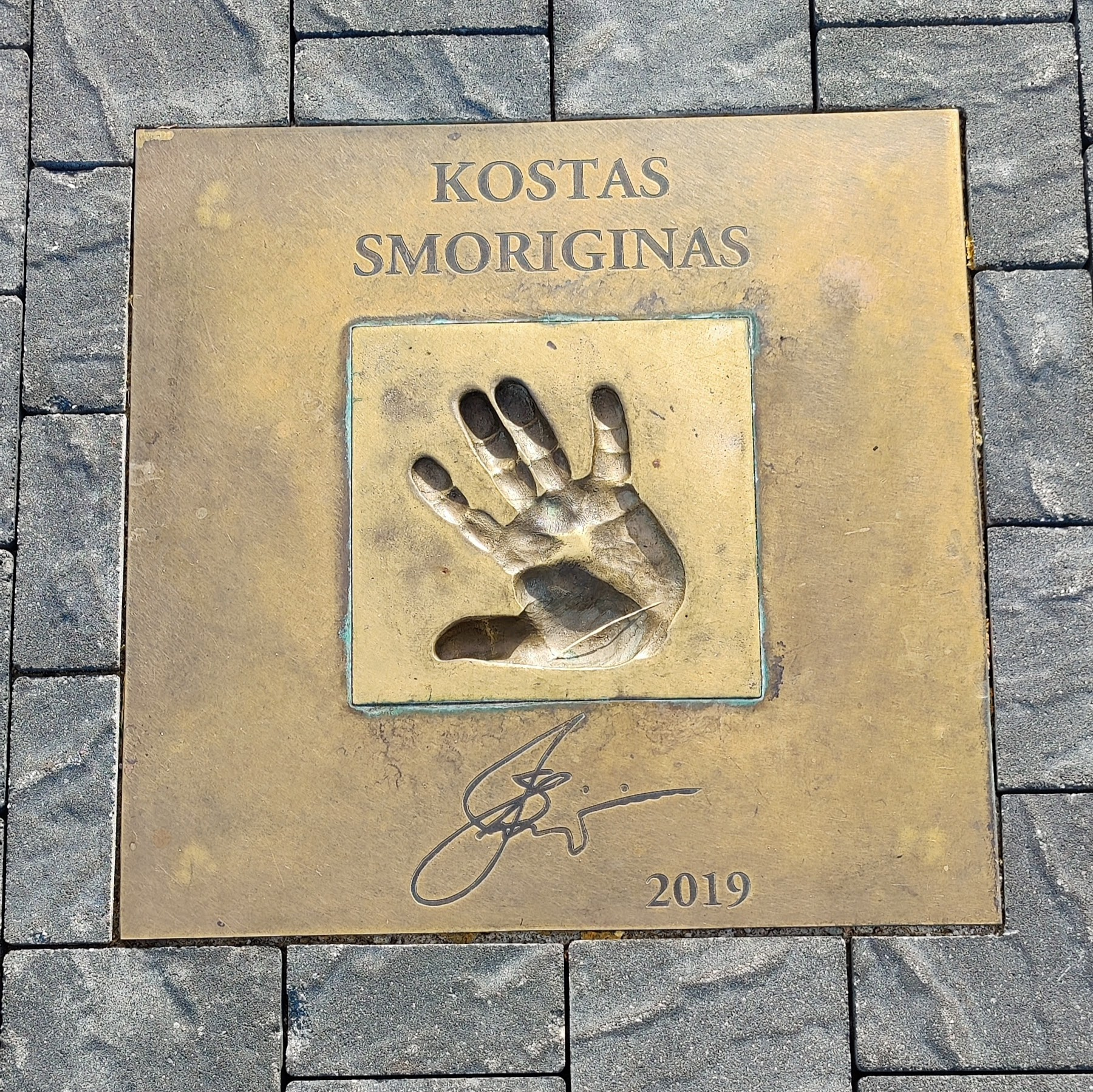
Handprint of Smoriginas at the Walk of Fame, Nida, Lithuania

From 1976 he played in over 40 films, including:

- Loss (2008)
- Nikolai Vavilov (1990), starring Nikolai Vavilov, a persecuted prominent Soviet biologist
- Walnut Bread (1977)

== Discography ==
Aktorių trio

- "Mūsų kaime"
- "Tikras garsas"
- "Vėl kartu"

Solo

- "Pilietis"
- "Ponai ir Ponios"

== Awards ==
- 2008: Best Actor award at Sidabrinė gervė 2008 Lithuanian film industry awards
- 2007: Knight's Cross of the Order for Merits to Lithuania
- 2001: Lithuanian National Prize
- 1999: Kristoforas Award
- 1987: USSR State Prize
