= Tadas Blinda =

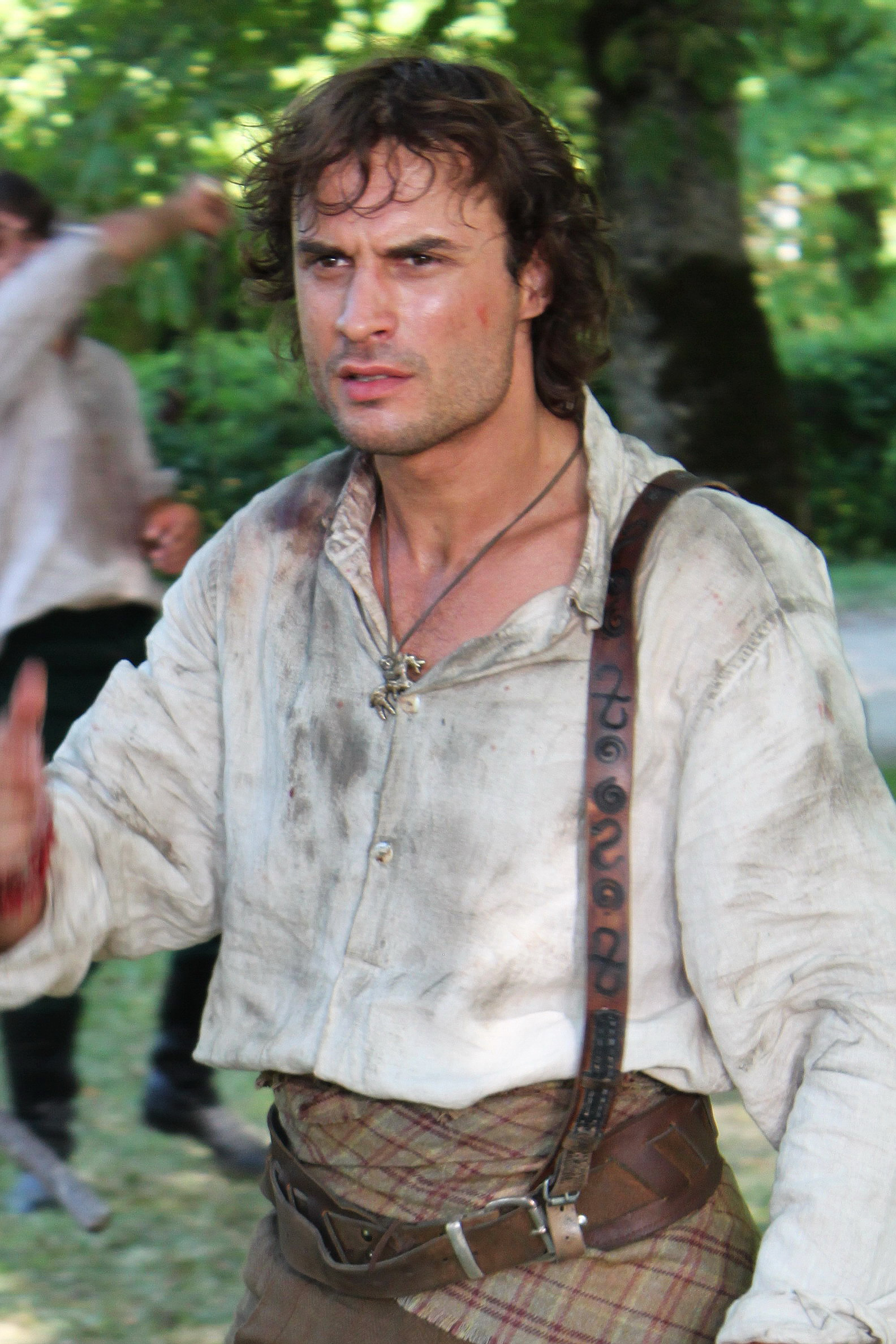
Tadas Blinda, as played by Mantas Jankavičius in the 2011 film Tadas Blinda. Pradžia

Tadas Blinda (1846–1877) was a Lithuanian outlaw and folk hero.

== Biography ==
He was born in the village of Kinčiuliai, Kovno Governorate, in the region of Samogitia, and inherited his father's 40 hectares at the age of 20. He then married, had three daughters, and became the village elder. There are several versions of the turning point in his life that led to his later career. One story has it that he participated in the 1863 uprising, and was sentenced to exile in Siberia. Another has it that his landlord, Duke Ogiński, ordered him to flog some serfs, became angry when Blinda refused, and then struck him with a whip. Blinda responded with a counterattack.

After Blinda had chosen to live outside the law, he gathered a band of followers in the dense forests near Byvainė. According to his admirers, he was a latter-day Robin Hood – he stole from the rich and gave to the poor. His detractors argued that he stole from the poor as well. Other stories have him disguising himself as a priest and collecting alms that he then gave away. Many of the tales claim that he buried a treasure in the forest, which remains undiscovered to this day.

The circumstances surrounding his death have also been an object of contention. The popularly held version was that Duke Oginskis was finally able to gain revenge by organizing the local authorities and murdering him. In 1993 an archivist uncovered police records indicating that he was lynched as a horse thief on April 22, 1877, and buried in an unconsecrated corner of a cemetery in Luokė. No traces of this burial have been found.

== Dramatizations ==
His life was first formally dramatized in 1907 by the Lithuanian writers Lazdynų Pelėda and Gabrielius Landsbergis-Žemkalnis. The play, Blinda, the Leveller of the World (Lithuanian: Blinda, svieto lygintojas), presented him as a champion of the common people, battling the Polish landlords and the Russian Empire that governed Lithuania, and was enthusiastically received.

The legend lived on and was made into a popular film in 1973. It featured the actor Vytautas Tomkus, dramatic hand-to-hand combat and horsemanship, and the scenery of Aukštaitija National Park — it was an immediate success. Although the film was released with the approval of the Soviet government, many viewers interpreted it as a veiled reference to the Lithuanian partisans who, living in the forests, continued to resist the Soviet occupation during the 1940s and 1950s.

Blinda's life was dramatized in a 2004 eponymous rock musical by Andrius Mamontovas that debuted in Vilnius. A local railway tour re-enacts a train robbery by Blinda, and Blindos beer by Švyturys-Utenos alus appeared in the 2000s.

Another movie, Tadas Blinda Pradžia, was produced by Tauras Films/Acme Film in 2011.
