= Single Valentine =

- Film poster
- Lithuanian: Valentinas vienas
- Starring: Vytautas Šapranauskas; Mantas Jankavičius
- Release date: 8 February 2013
- Running time: 97 minutes
- Country: Lithuania
- Language: Lithuanian

Single Valentine (Lithuanian: Valentinas vienas) is a 2013 Lithuanian comedy film directed by Simonas Aškelavičius, Edita Kabaraitė, Ričardas Marcinkus, and Donatas Ulvydas.

== Plot ==
Four couples (identified as the "boring couple", "best friends", "ex-couple", and "night stand") celebrate the Valentine's Day. A guy, a named Valentine, who is alone despite his efforts, provides a superficial connection between the couples.
