= The Generation of Evil =

2022 Lithuanian crime thriller film

Generation of Evil
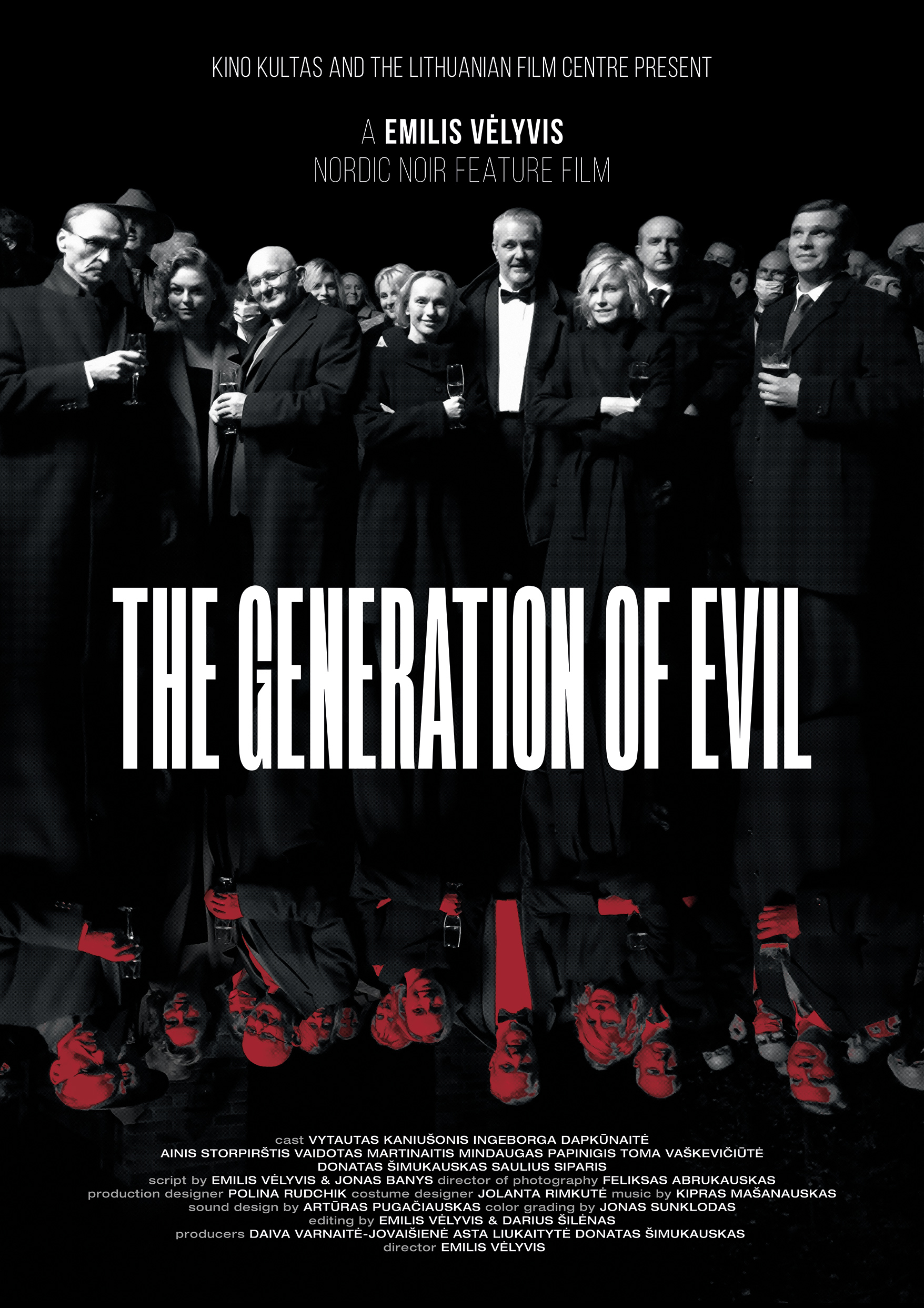
- Lithuanian: Piktųjų karta
- Directed by: Emilis Vėlyvis
- Written by: Jonas Banys; Emilis Vėlyvis
- Screenplay by: Jonas Banys; Emilis Vėlyvis
- Produced by: Daiva Varnaitė Jovaišienė; Asta Liukaitytė; Donatas Šimukauskas
- Starring: Vytautas Kaniusonis; Ingeborga Dapkūnaitė; Saulius Siparis; Donatas Šimukauskas; Ainis Storpirštis
- Cinematography: Feliksas Abrukauskas L.A.C.
- Edited by: Emilis Vėlyvis, Darius Šilėnas
- Music by: Kipras Mašanauskas
- Production company: Kino Kultas
- Release date: 14 October 2022 (Lithuania)
- Running time: 114 minutes
- Country: Lithuania
- Language: Lithuanian

Generation of Evil (Lithuanian: Piktųjų karta) is a 2022 Lithuanian nordic noir crime thriller film by Emilis Vėlyvis, starring Vytautas Kaniušonis, Ingeborga Dapkūnaitė, and Saulius Siparis.

== Plot ==
Gintas Krasauskas is a 55-year-old police chief in a small town. He is a model family man with a wife and two children, and he aspires to become the town's mayor. However, he is also sleeping with the wife of his friend Laimonas, the town's prosecutor general.

Laimonas is soon found dead in a suspected suicide. The national prosecutor, Simonas, joins the investigation and discovers that the man's real cause of death was due to prolonged torture: a venomous snake was inserted into his body.

A flashback to the year 1990 reveals that the town's current elite—Gintas, Laimonas, judge Julius, priest Antanas, and the incumbent female mayor, Rasa, were once Soviet KGB informants.

During the course of a few days, the judge and priest join the list of the dead, Gintas is suspected of the murders, and events take an unexpected turn. Gintas visits his mother, who predicts that her son will be next to die. Simonas is revealed to have accidentally witnessed the secret events of 1990, while still a kid. He proceeds to set Rasa on fire and shoots Gintas. Gintas' young son, Ben, shoots Simonas in turn.

== Production ==
Principal photography for The Generation of Evil took place in the Lithuanian city of Plungė in 2020.

== Cast ==
- Vytautas Kaniušonis as police chief Gintas Krasauskas
  - James Tratas as young Gintas
- Ingeborga Dapkūnaitė as mayor Rasa Kymantaitė
- lt:Elvyra Žebertavičiūtė as Gintas' mother
- Donatas Šimukauskas as police officer Arūnas
- lt:Saulius Siparis as prosecutor Laimonas Liaudanskas
  - Marius Siparis as young Laimonas
- Ainis Storpirštis as national prosecutor Simonas
- Vaidotas Martinaitis as judge Julius
- Toma Vaškevičiūtė as wife of police chief Gintas
- Sakalas Uždavinys as Vytautas Venclova
- Marius Repšys as criminal investigator
- Mindaugas Papinigis as the mayor's clerk

== Critical reception ==
In a 2022 review, Darius Voitukevičius of Delfi.lt wrote that The Generation of Evil is "high-caliber, unpredictable, tense, and the most mature film by Vėlyvis, who has proven that not only Scandinavians have the talent to create strong detective cinema".

In a separate article, the publication wrote that the "Scandinavian noir film has attempted to show the work of law enforcement officers (...) without sugarcoating and exaggerated heroism".

Milda Govedaitè with 15min wrote, "Director Emilis Vėlyvis has seemingly decided to abandon the adult-only jokes of his earlier films and move on with a mature, solid criminal detective story this time around", adding, "It is possible that we have not seen such a cruel Lithuanian film before".

The Generation of Evil won the Reims Polar Audience Award in 2022.
