= Redirected (film) =

2014 film directed by Emilis Vėlyvis

- Theatrical release poster
- Directed by: Emilis Vėlyvis
- Written by: Jonas Banys; Lewis Britnell; Emilis Vėlyvis
- Produced by: Daiva Jovaišienė; Asta Liukaitytė; Andrius Paulavičius; Donatas Šimukauskas
- Starring: Vinnie Jones; Scot Williams; Gil Darnell; Oliver Jackson; Anthony Strachan; Mindaugas Papinigis; Jack Cooper; Artur Smolyaninov
- Cinematography: Feliksas Abrukauskas
- Edited by: Viktė Simukauskienė; Lewis Britnell; Emilis Velyvis
- Music by: Paulius Kilbauskas; Domas Strupinskas
- Production companies: Kinokultas; Wellington Films
- Distributed by: Koch Film
- Release dates: 10 January 2014 (Lithuania); 13 November 2014 (UK)
- Running time: 99 minutes
- Countries: Lithuania; United Kingdom
- Languages: English; Russian; Lithuanian; Polish
- Budget: $2.7 million
- Box office: $1.8 million (Lithuania)

Redirected is a 2014 Lithuanian-British gangster action comedy film directed by Emilis Vėlyvis and starring Vinnie Jones, Scot Williams, and Vytautas Šapranauskas. The film features four friends turned first–time robbers who get stranded in Eastern Europe and have to find their way back home. The film premiered in Lithuania on 10 January 2014 and was released in the United Kingdom on 13 November 2014.

== Plot ==
The film is divided in five parts: Introduction, Birthday in Malaysia, The myth of eastern Europe, Once upon a time in European Union, and Lithuanian wedding.

In London, Johnny, Ben, and Tim are employed by Karl to rob an illegal poker game. In particular, Karl wants the ring of a local criminal Golden Pole. Karl insists that three men is insufficient to pull of the heist. Forced to have the fourth man, they kidnap their friend Michael, who works as a guard at Buckingham Palace, and keep him uninformed about the happenings.

At the poker game, Johnny, Ben, and Tim infiltrate the poker game while Michael stays in the van. They take Golden Pole's ring and, sensing that they are outmatched, ask Karl, one of the players, if it is the ring he was looking for. While the standoff is happening, Michael leaves the van to investigate why his friends haven't yet returned. He returns to the van when he hears gunshots coming from the building. The men leave with the money and ring. Knowing that Karl is behind the robbery, Golden Pole kills him. They identify Michael as one of the men involved with the heist from the surveillance footage.

After a successful heist, Johnny, Ben, and Tim tell Michael about their plan and that they are going to use the money to go to Malaysia. Michael wants nothing to do with them and goes back home, since it is his birthday and he wants to celebrate with his girlfriend. Golden Pole's crew tracks Michael to his house, break in, and chase him out. Michael goes to the airport to confront his friends and try to convince them to give back the money and ring. He attacks them, and Tim hits Michael with a fire extinguisher, which results in Michael boarding the plane unconscious. While in flight, a volcano in Iceland erupts and causes all flights to be grounded. The plane is redirected to Lithuania.

Michael wakes up in a hotel, without a slightest idea where he is. He leaves the hotel and attempts to go home, only to learn that few people speak English and he is in Lithuania. He returns to the room, where he finds the money that Johnny hid inside a toilet cistern. Meanwhile, his friends are at a club where they got drunk and danced with women. Johnny leaves with a woman. Before he can have sex with her, a man knocks him out with a baseball bat. Michael leaves the hotel and takes a taxi to the airport with the money. The taxi driver pulls into an alley where Michael is attacked by another man. Michael is able to escape, but the men find the money, ending in the taxi driver being shot and the other man leaving with the money.

Michael returns to the hotel only to find Golden Pole and his crew in his room. Before they can get answers out of Michael, the local police pick Michael up to question him about the whereabouts of his friends. While talking to the police chief, another police man comes in, who turns out to be the man who attacked Michael in the alley and who currently has the money. After leaving the police station, Michael runs away but is chased by the police officer. Before he can be caught, Michael is hit by an ambulance and is knocked out.

Meanwhile, Johnny wakes up alone in an empty apartment naked and chained to a radiator. After a horny Catholic priest and hooker discover him, John escapes still naked and chained to the radiator. The woman from the previous night is seen by Johnny and is chased. She attacks him in the upper floor of a dilapidated building and they fall through the floor, both being knocked unconscious. Michael wakes up in a hole with the two paramedics from the ambulance throwing dirt on him. He successfully attacks them and has one of them drive him back to the police station to follow the corrupt police officer. Michael forces officer to drive him back to his house, where the money is stashed. He finds Johnny's drivers license, but before he can say anything, another man shows up and knocks him out. They drive him to a desolate place and point guns at him. Bullets are heard, but it is implied that the men, not Michael, are killed.

Elsewhere, after their night at the club, Ben and Tim wake up in a countryside farm. They find a woman in the house and Ben notices that she is wearing his ring. She says he gave it to her the previous night as a wedding present. He asks for it back, but she refuses, and he attempts to take it from her. Her fiancé shows up and chases them out of the house, shooting at them as they drive away in a truck. The truck runs out of gas and, after arguing and discovering inappropriate tattoos on their bodies, they investigate a noise coming from the back of the truck. It is full of immigrants from an African country, who assume they've arrived in England due to Ben and Tim's accents. They leave the immigrants and walk to a local bar where they ask to call a taxi but are met with resistance from the group of drinkers and end up fighting them before being thrown through the windows.

It is revealed that the people that killed Michael's attackers are Golden Pole's men, who confront Michael. While this is happening, the fiancé has found Tim and Ben and hangs them upside-down in a barn. Also at the same time, Johnny and the hooker are found by their friend. They stop by a gas station, where they run into Golden Pole, who recognizes Johnny and chases them, resulting in them crashing into a tree. Golden Pole's crew captures Johnny and show him that they've also captured Michael. It turns out that Golden Pole has the money they stole but not the ring. Ben and Tim call while they are talking, telling Golden Pole that they have the ring but that their captors need money to release them. They tell them to meet them at the wedding the next day.

After the wedding, which was presided over by the priest from before, Golden Pole and his crew show up and start shooting. Golden Pole demands the ring, which turns out to be the ring that Ben gave her the previous night and is now her husband's wedding ring. A shoot out commences between the local smugglers and Golden Pole's crew. John, Ben, Tim, and Michael barely escape only to find themselves confronted by a soldier in a Russian tank. Declaring themselves from England, the soldier becomes hostile and forces them to walk back across the border, their fates unknown.

== Cast ==
- Vinnie Jones as Golden Pole
- Scot Williams as Michael
- Gil Darnell as John
- Oliver Jackson as Tim
- Anthony Strachan as Ben
- Andrius Žiurauskas as Staska
- Vytautas Šapranauskas as Algis
- Mindaugas Papinigis as Vova
- Artur Smolyaninov as Doncius
- Vita Šiaučiūnaitė as Saulė
- Monika Vaičiulytė as Simona
- Daniel Nehme as Turk
- Daniel Bowker as Meat
- Andrew McHale as Karl
- Aurimas Meliešius as Vycka

== Awards ==
The film was nominated to the UK film Awards as the best drama and to the Silver Cranes Awards (Lithuania), as best film and best director.

== Release ==
Redirected earned $1.8 million in Lithuania, where it premiered in January 2014. It was released in the UK on 13 November 2014.
