= Walnut Bread =

- Lithuanian: Riešutų duona
- Directed by: Arūnas Žebriūnas
- Starring: Algirdas Latėnas; Saulius Sipaitis
- Cinematography: Algimantas Mockus
- Edited by: Vanda Surviliene
- Music by: Vyacheslav Ganelin
- Production company: Lithuanian Film Studios
- Distributed by: Goskino; International Film Exchange (IFEX)
- Release date: 17 December 1977
- Running time: 69 minutes
- Country: Soviet Union
- Languages: Lithuanian, Russian

Walnut Bread (Lithuanian: Riešutų duona) is a 1977 Lithuanian romance film (made in Soviet times) directed by Arūnas Žebriūnas.

== Production ==
Filmed in Sovcolor on 35 mm film in a 2.35:1 ratio.

== Plot ==
In rural postwar Lithuania, the Šatai and Kaminskai families live next door to each other. A cow sold to the Kaminskai dies, creating enmity between the families. Andrius Šatas and Liuka Kaminskaitė grow up together and fall in love.

== Cast ==
- Algirdas Latėnas – Andrius Šatas
- Saulius Sipaitis – Antanas, Andrius father
- Doloresa Kazragytė – Elytė, Andrius mother
- Leonid Obolensky – Andrius's grandfather
- Stasys Jonynas – young Andrius
- Elvyra Piškinaitė – Liuka Kaminskaitė
- Antanas Šurna – Liuka's aunt
- Regina Arbačiauskaitė – Liuka's mom
- Kostas Smoriginas – Liuka's brother
