= Tadas Blinda. Pradžia =

- Theatrical poster
- Directed by: Donatas Ulvydas
- Written by: Jonas Banys
- Produced by: Žilvinas Naujokas
- Starring: Mantas Jankavičius; Dainius Kazlauskas; Vidas Petkevičius; Andrius Kaniava; Donatas Banionis; Agnė Ditkovskytė; Tatyana Liutayeva; Antanas Šurna
- Cinematography: Algimantas Mikutėnas
- Music by: Linas Rimša
- Release date: September 20, 2011
- Running time: 106 minutes
- Country: Lithuania
- Languages: Lithuanian, Russian
- Budget: €900,000 (est.)

Tadas Blinda. Pradžia (lit. 'Tadas Blinda. The beginning') is a 2011 Lithuanian adventure film, directed by Donatas Ulvydas, based on the 1987 Rimantas Šavelis novel Tadas Blinda and on the legendary history of the 19th-century outlaw Tadas Blinda.

== Plot ==
The film begins in the winter of 1846. Two brothers are seen running through a forest from a black wolf. Present in the forest are two hunters in search of hares. While running, one of the brothers stumbles and falls into a creek, and his brother fails to rescue him. The boy is seen drowning.

The scene then shifts to a summer day in 1861, where a serf named Tadas Blinda wakes up from dreaming the last scene while washing himself. Then, he and his friend Vincas venture into a forest. While walking, Tadas tells his friend about how the previous landowner Adam Razumowski died during a hunting trip, how his wife committed suicide, and that their money is buried somewhere. Tadas dreams of finding the money and buying his freedom from his master Gruinius. Once they arrive at the forest, they see a young woman by a pond trying to fish out a water lily. The two men think she is a ghost of the late Razumowski's wife and make a scene, frightening the woman so that she falls into the pond. Tadas rushes into the pond to save her.

The scene then shifts to a man looking for his wife Konstancija, who is secretly having an affair with a man named Edmundas in the cellar. Konstancija rushes into the hallway and tells her husband, a landowner named Bernardas Gruinius, that she was only looking for the cook. The suspicious Bernardas runs to the cellar to check if someone is there, but finds no one. Edmundas avoids detection by hiding in an old chest.

In St. Petersburg, the imperial statesman Mikhail Muravyov informs the Junior Officer of the Imperial Army Janek Razumowski that Czar Alexander II has emancipated the serfs in the Northwestern Krai and commands him to gather his troops to suppress the impending peasant rebellion in that region. On that notice, Janek leaves for Lithuania.

Back at Gruinius' mansion, steward Edmundas (Konstancija's lover) threatens Bernardas to spill his secret because he is late on his bribe payments. Before a bigger conflict evolves, Janek arrives to the mansion and tells him that he has important news from St. Petersburg. While the serfs are celebrating Saint Jonas' Festival, the Lithuanian nobility (Bernardas included) are discussing the recent Alexander II's Emancipation Manifesto. Janek warns the noblemen that, although the serfs have freedom, they do not have land, which, he cites, is a ground for rebellion.

Meanwhile, Edmundas tells the serfs that they are free, and directs them to Gruinius's mansion. When the serfs arrive to the mansion, the nobles, feeling threatened, raise arms against them. Bernardas tries to resolve the conflict peacefully, but Janek orders a raid against the peasants.

During the raid, Tadas is captured by Janek's troops, knocked unconscious, and left tied up inside a shack. Later that night, two of Tadas's friends, Vincas and Motiejus, rescue him. While wandering around town at night, Tadas discovers Edmundas making love to Konstancija in the stables. Upon being discovered, Edmundas accidentally knocks a lantern over and causes a fire in the stables, and later, a rebellion.

In pursuit by Edmundas, Tadas hides in one of the rooms in Gruinius' mansion. The room happens to be occupied by Kristina, the young woman at the pond whom Tadas rescued earlier. With Kristina's help, Tadas escapes the mansion unnoticed. Outside, Bernardas, Janek and his men try to put out the fire. Tadas chances upon his two friends, Vincas and Motiejus, near the stables, and Janek notices the runaway. Tadas and Vincas attempt to flee from Janek, but Janek shoots and kills Vincas. Before Janek has time to check on the corpse, Tadas is rescued from the scene by Motiejus on horseback.

At dawn, an infuriated Motiejus physically chastises Tadas for his lack of gratitude. He is upset about the fact that people have to suffer for him when saving him from trouble, but he does nothing in return for them. While Janek's men search for rebels, Tadas, feeling guilty for his actions, goes back to the village and gives his dead friend a proper burial. While wandering through town, he overhears a rebel interrogation led by one of Janek's men and takes the blame on himself for inciting the rebellion. He also discloses the rebels' hiding location – the swamp. Tadas is then forced to lead Janek's men to the hiding location. The interrogated rebels are furious at Tadas for revealing their hiding spot, but he saves them by suddenly launching a successful coup de main at the swamp against the troops.

Once freed, however, the rebels are ungrateful and even attempt to hang Tadas for his earlier treachery. Motiejus rushes into the scene and saves him. He tells the men that Tadas was the one who incited the rebellion by starting the fire in the stables and the rebels treat him with more respect. Later, more men want to join in to rebel, but Tadas rebukes them, saying that there should not be rebellion, and that he just wants to get back to ploughing the land. Still, the rebels convince him to fight for his freedom from serfdom.

Back in Gruinius' estate, Bernardas worries about how the world has turned – how he cannot tell his friends from his enemies anymore. He attempts to murder his steward Edmundas in his sleep, but Edmundas appears on the couch, brandishing a gun. Bernardas tries to throw a burning candle in his face, but ends up being tied up and forced to sign off his estate to him.

In St. Petersburg, Statesman Muravyov receives the news that Janek has successfully incited the rebellion, and immediately sends a telegraph to Rittmeister Snegiryov, instructing him to go help put down the rebellion.

After securing the estate, Edmundas begins making plans with Konstancija, and Kristina chances upon both of them kissing. Feeling hurt, she rides off to the forest, where she meets Tadas. He reveals to her his plans to rebel, but Kristina warns him that the Czar's army will be there tomorrow.

The next day, Janek goes out to meet the Czar's army led by Rittmeister Snegiryov. As the army makes its way to Gruinius' mansion, Edmundas appears and informs Janek that Gruinius and his peasants are instigating a rebellion. Edmundas and the army continue the journey, but are stopped by Blinda, who has prepared an ambush. Edmundas attempts to run off in the confusion, but is met by two rebels. They are eventually subdued by Janek, who has become highly suspicious of Edmundas' intentions. He threatens to kill him, but Edmundas retorts that if he dies, he will not be able to reveal who killed his father Adam. Then, Tadas starts fighting Janek, and Edmundas uses that opportunity to run away. Later, Janek is seen pursuing Edmundas.

Rottmeister Snegiryov finally arrives at Gruinius' estate, wounded from the ambush. He is apparently angry with Bernardas, and tells him to bring forth Tadas Blinda or else he will have him sent off to Siberia. Bernardas starts to lose hope in the situation, but his daughter Kristina tells him that help will soon be on its way.

Back at the rebel hideout, Tadas becomes disillusioned once more and tells everyone that if they continue to fight, they will only bring more trouble upon themselves. He doesn't want to accept his status as a rebel. Later, Tadas and Bernardas meet under a tree, and Bernardas recounts his secret that has been nagging him for fifteen years:

In the winter of 1846, two noblemen – Adam Razumowski and Bernardas Gruinius – went to hunt in a forest. Adam was drinking heavily when Bernardas heard the shouts of a serf kid whose brother was drowning in a creek. He rushed to save him. After dragging the kid out of the water, Bernardas saw the drunk Adam brandishing a gun, ready to shoot the unconscious boy because he thought "Lithuanian serfs were worthless". Protective of his serf, Bernardas tried to disarm his friend, and the first shot went into the air. Adam tried to get the second shot as the two noblemen continued to struggle with the gun, but he ended up shooting himself. Soon, the young Edmundas, who had witnessed the whole scene, appeared and told the distraught Bernardas that his secret will be safe with him. Seeing that Adam was still alive, Edmundas dumped his body into the creek.

At the Gruinius' estate, Edmundas, who has now been captured by Janek, reveals the secret of Adam's death, twisting the facts to portray Gruinius as a traitor who saved a rebel–turned serf Tadas Blinda in place of his father Adam. Furious at receiving such news, Janek goes off to Gruinius' mansion.

Bernardas returns home only to find his servant dead, and his family held captive by Snegiryov and Janek. Snegiryov tells Bernardas that he will be sent to Siberia for helping the rebels and Janek delivers a knockout to the landowner. Then, Snegiryov threatens to shoot the unconscious Bernardas if the two captives don't tell where Tadas Blinda is hiding. Kristina does, and the army leaves.

After seeing Tadas conversing with their master, the rebels become wary of him. Motiejus suspects that Tadas has switched sides. In truth, after the eye–opening conversation with Bernardas, Tadas no longer believes that the masters are the enemy – rather, the invading Russian soldiers, who want an internal clash so that they would have an excuse to exercise authority over the two groups, are the adversary. He tells this to the skeptical rebels, and leaves for Gruinius' estate to fight the soldiers alone.

The Russian soldiers (headed by Janek and Snegiryov) meet Blinda in the battlefield. Soon, the rebels, headed by Motiejus, join Blinda, and the battle commences. After a while of fighting, the Russian soldiers retreat from the battlefield. Although both sides suffer many casualties, Blinda, Motiejus, Snegiryov and Janek survive.

While the battle is going on, Edmundas sneaks into Gruinius' mansion and takes advantage of the captives. He attempts to strangulate Kristina, demanding her to tell him where they keep their money. Konstancija does, and Edmundas pushes her outside to lead him to the money. Bernardas, regaining consciousness, goes outside and finds Edmundas. Fully cognizant of the misfortune he has brought onto the family, Bernardas forcibly drowns him in a nearby swamp.

Gruinius and his family attempt to flee their estate, but they are met by the retreating Janek and Snegiryov. Janek takes Bernardas out for a sword duel, and Snegiryov carries Kristina away in a carriage. Janek wins the sword duel and is about to kill Bernardas when Tadas shows up with his sword. He subdues Janek and knocks him to the ground. As a last resort, Janek tries to shoot Tadas, but Motiejus sees this and shoots the young officer first, killing him instantly.

Bernardas takes the estate deed from Janek and gives it to Tadas, begging him to find his daughter. Tadas, in turn, gives the deed to the rebels and rides off on horseback in search of Kristina. Meanwhile, Bernardas forgives his wife for her infidelity. Snegiryov throws Kristina out of the carriage in the middle of the field, and Tadas finds her, unconscious. He initially thinks that Kristina is dead, but lets out a sigh of relief after she whispers to him. The film ends with an aerial shot of them both lying on the grass.

== Cast ==
- Mantas Jankavičius as Tadas Blinda
- Agnia Ditkovskyte as Kristina Gruinytė
- Vidas Petkevičius as Bernardas Gruinius
- Tatyana Lyutaeva as Konstancija Gruinienė
- Mykolas Vildžiūnas as Janek Razumowski
- Dainius Kazlauskas as Edmundas
- Jokūbas Bareikis as Motiejus
- Andrius Kaniava as Adam Razumowski
- Donatas Banionis as Mikhail Muravyov
- Antanas Šurna as Snegiryov

== Reception ==
=== Box office ===
The film became the most commercially successful film in the history of independent Lithuania. The film attendance reached 300,000 people and its revenue totaled about €1,100,000.

=== Critical reception ===
The critics praised the film for its natural scenery and criticized it for its content. Specifically, they disliked the fact that the state financed a film that portrayed the positive aspects of an outlaw. (The Lithuanian Ministry of Culture contributed about 2 million litai towards the film's expenses, out of an estimated total expense of 3.2 to 3.4 million litai.)
