= Titas Petrikis =

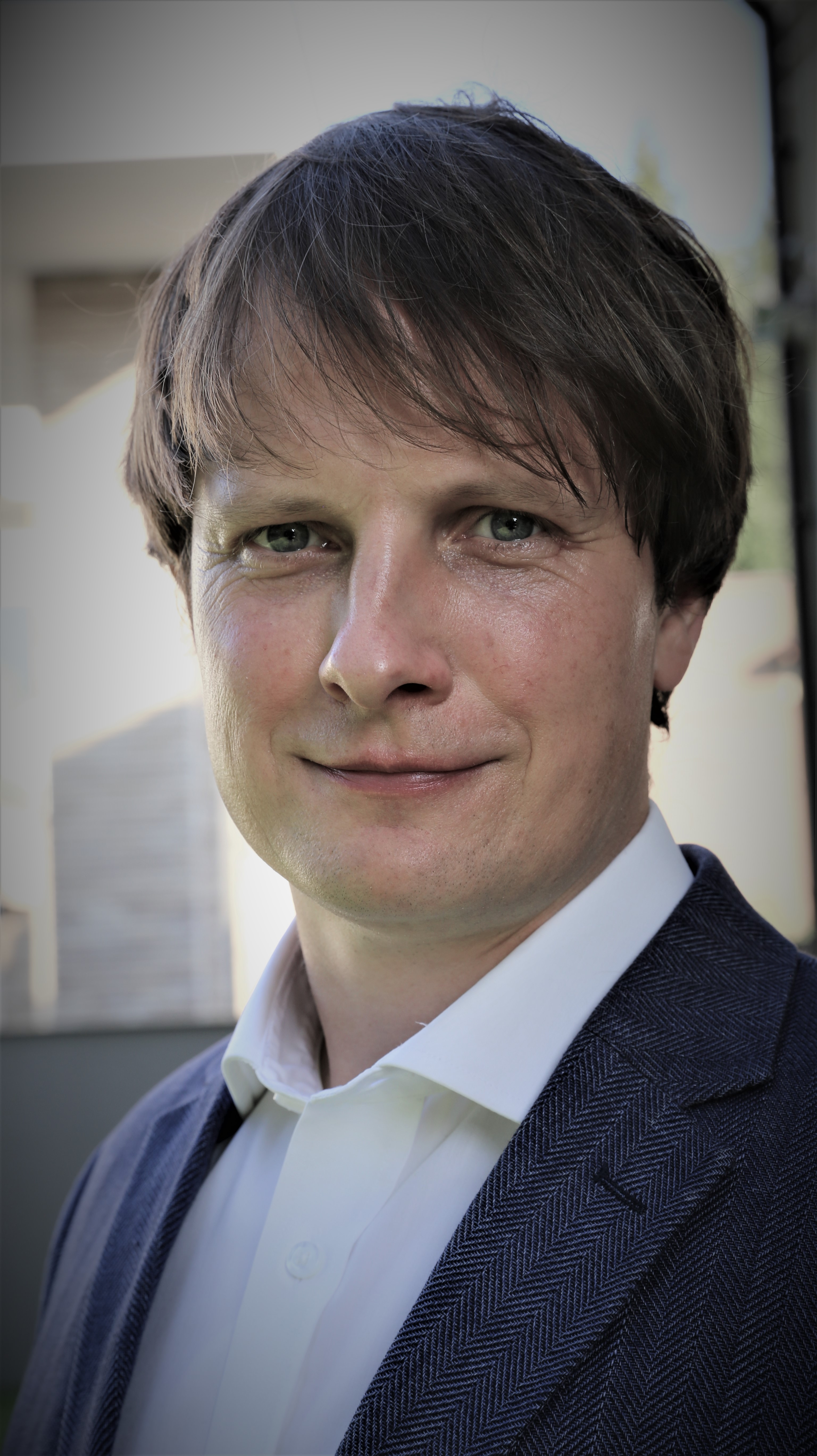

Dr. Titas Petrikis is a music composer and visual artist. He gained his PhD in film and sound composition at Bournemouth University in 2014 (supervised by prof. Stephen Deutsch). His research explored the relation of sound design and music in films, and how soundtracks may be used to create a contextual, multi-layer meaning. Petrikis has also received his master's degree in music composing for films at Bournemouth University in 2006.

Petrikis' talent was recognized at SoundTrack Cologne 6.0 (2009) (Germany), where he was awarded Peer Raben Award for the music in the short film Noirville (dir. Andy Marsh). He became a finalist of the Talent Campus Volkswagen Score competition in Berlinale 2007 (Germany). In addition to Diamond Award (European Independent Film Award), Jury Prize (Festigious International Film Festival), and Honorable Mention (Global Film Festival Awards), Mr. Petrikis received silver medal at Global Music Awards for the soundtrack of Owl Mountain (dir. by Juzenas 2018). His music for films was nominated five times for the Lithuanian Silver Crane Best Music Award. For over twenty years Petrikis has been creating music for films, TV, theatre and concert performances, and audio-visual installations. Since 2012 he is a member of the European Film Academy (EFA). He joined the Lithuanian Film Academy (LiKA) in 2013.

Mr. Petrikis gives lectures and presentations at universities, international film teaching programs, and conferences. He has been granted tenure professorship since 2019. Mr. Petrikis has scored over 40 films, composed music for theatre, TV and radio productions, and has released several independent music albums.
