= Emilis Vėlyvis =

Lithuanian film director, writer, producer (born 1979)

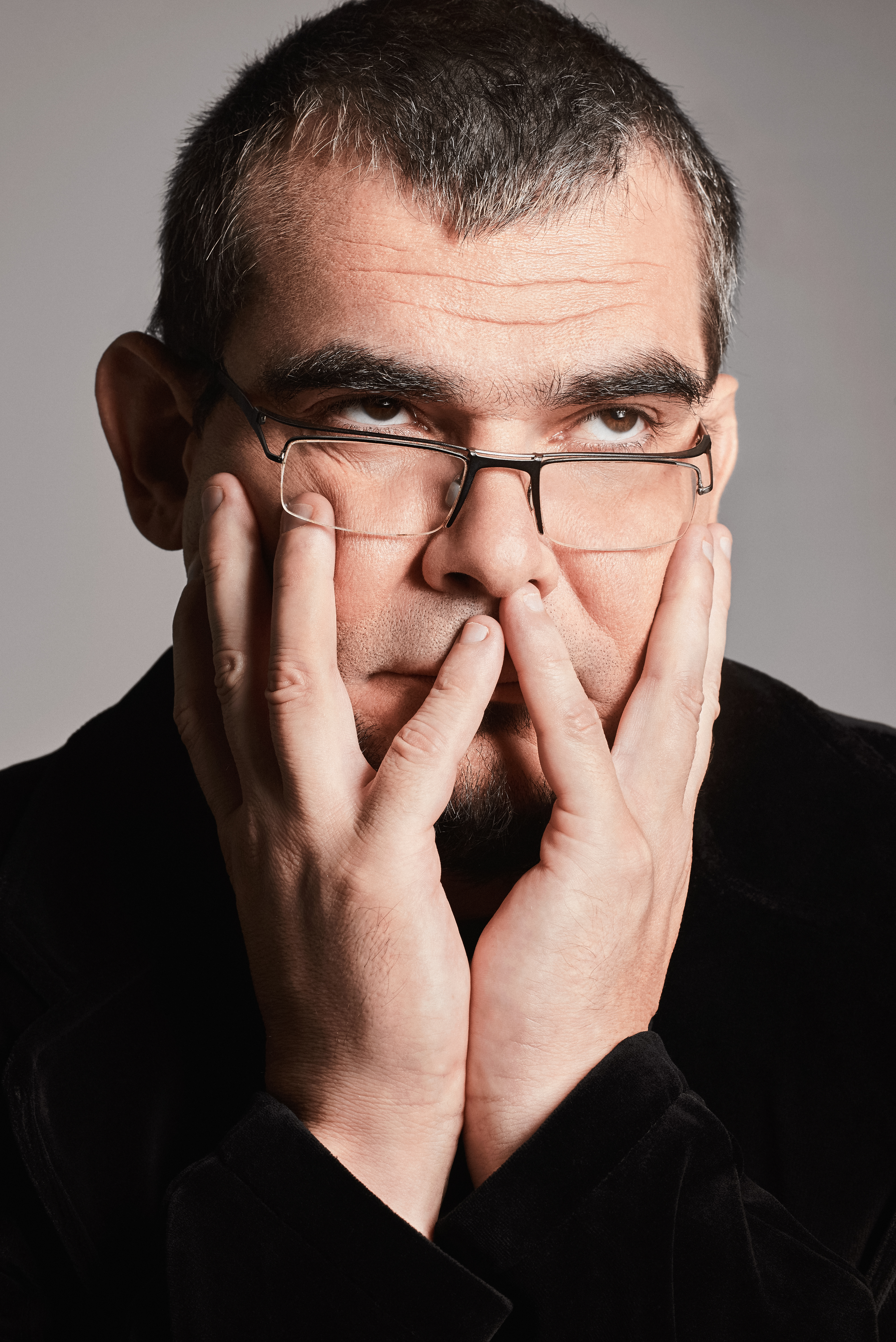
- Emilis Vėlyvis in 2022
- Born: 30 May 1979 (age 47); Vilnius, Lithuania
- Education: Vilnius Academy of Arts
- Occupations: Film director; producer; screenwriter; artist

Emilis Vėlyvis (born 30 May 1979) is a famous Lithuanian film director, screenwriter, and artist. He graduated with a master's degree from the Vilnius Academy of Arts in 2002 and studied at the Academy of Fine Arts in Warsaw. He is the director and a writer of The Generation of Evil (2022), Redirected (2014), Zero 3 (2017), Zero 2 (2010) and Zero. Lilac Lithuania (2006).

The works of Emilis Velyvis are characterized by a sharp approach, shocking images and behavior, black humor.

== Career ==
Emilis Velyvis won the admission to Vilnius Academy of Arts in 1996 where the fierce competition numbered three candidates for each vacancy. In an interview with Lietuvos rytas in 2022 Velyvis said he had ″degraded″ to cinematography from fine arts: ″I am the best director among fine arts painters″.

Emilis Velyvis moved to Stuttgart, Germany in 2003 to participate in a variety of projects. There, Velyvis made his first short film, Lithuanians in the EU. Around that time he continued working on the script for his full-length film Zero. Lilac Lithuania. The film gained international acclaim immediately after hitting the silver screen in 2006. This was followed by Zero 2, Zero 3, and other short and full-length films.

== Critical acclaim ==
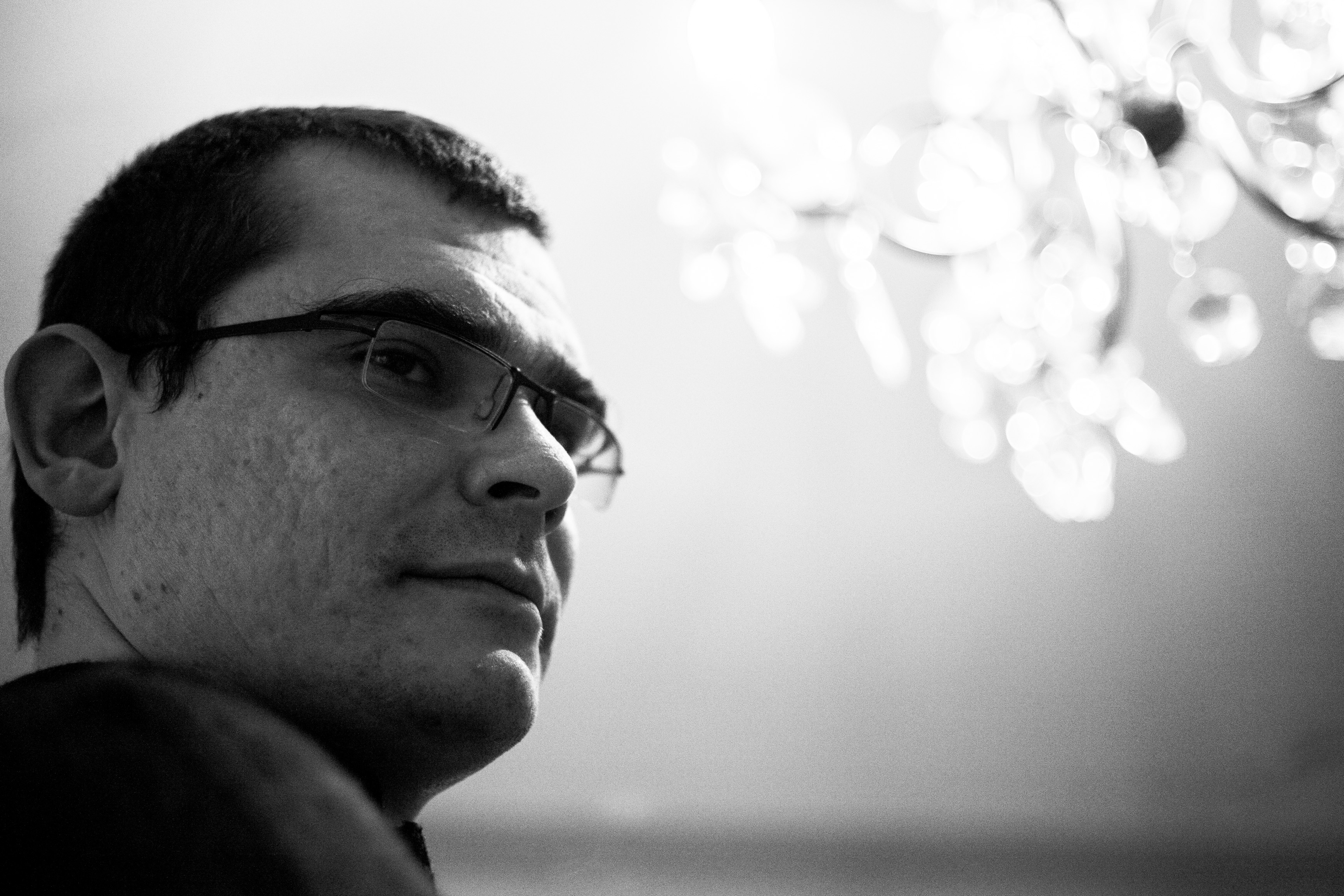
Emilis Vėlyvis in winter 2012

Vėlyvis' film Redirected had become the most-ever watched movie in Lithuania as of 2015, according to newspaper Kauno Diena.

The later Velyvis' film The Generation of Evil is a detective story inspired by American director David Fincher. The film depicts work of law enforcement without "sugary coating", describes a film review.

The Generation of Evil is a high-caliber, unpredictable, tense and the most mature film by Vėlyvis. Director Emilis Vėlyvis proved that not only Scandinavians have the talent to create such strong detective cinema, wrote Delfi.lt in a review in 2022.

The Generation of Evil earned the Audience of the Reims Polar award in 2022.

== Filmography ==
- Zero. Lilac Lithuania (2006)
- Zero 2 (2010)
- Redirected (2014)
- Zero 3 (2017)
- The Generation of Evil (2022)
- A Wolf's Prey (2025)
- To Catch A Hawk (2027, principal photography August-November 2026)

== Selected awards and nominations ==
- 2010 – Winner – Best screen play - Silver Crane Award for Zero 2
- 2014 – Winner – Best editing - Silver Crane Award for Redirected
- 2017 – Winner – Best editing - Silver Crane Award for Zero 3
- 2022 – Winner – Audience Award – Reims Polar for The Generation of Evil
