= Sruoga =

- Lithuanian surname
- m.: Sruoga
- f.: (unmarried): Sruogaitė
- f.: (married): Sruogienė

Sruoga is a Lithuanian surname originated from the nickname Sruoga literally meaning thread wound from a spool on a bow, fiber of flax, hair of wool. Notable people with the surname include:

- Balys Sruoga (1896–1947), Lithuanian author
- Daniela Sruoga (born 1987), Argentine field hockey player
- Josefina Sruoga (born 1990), Argentine field hockey player
- Kazys Sruoga (1889–1974), Lithuanian economist
- Vanda Daugirdaitė-Sruogienė (1899 – 1997), Lithuanian historian, educator, and cultural activist
