= Juozas Sruoga =

Lithuanian diplomat (1886–1957)

Juozapas Sruoga
- Born: 12 March 1886; Baibokai, Kovno Governorate, Russian Empire
- Died: 12 December 1957 (aged 71); Kaunas, Lithuanian SSR
- Education: Jelgava Gymnasium
- Alma mater: Saint Petersburg State University
- Occupation: Diplomat
- Movement: Great Seimas of Vilnius
- Spouse: Bronė Jazbutytė
- Children: Marija Jolita Sruogaitė (1934–2016)
- Relatives: Balys Sruoga, Adolfas Sruoga, Kazys Sruoga

Juozas Sruoga (12 March 1886 – 12 December 1957) was a Lithuanian diplomat. He was the brother of writer Balys Sruoga.

== Biography ==
Sruoga was born on 12 March 1886 in the village of Baibokai, near modern-day Biržai, then the Kovno Governorate of the Russian Empire. After graduating from Jelgava Gymnasium, Sruoga studied law in St. Petersburg and also studied at the Berlin Trade Institute. In 1905, along with Ernestas Galvanauskas (who was a distant relative), Sruoga participated in the Russian Revolution of 1905. Sruoga organized Lithuanian-language evenings and cut phone wires. Sruoga also was a delegate of the Great Seimas of Vilnius. He was subsequently imprisoned, and released only on the condition that he would return to live with his parents. During the First World War, Sruoga graduated from a military engineering school and was heavily injured near Warsaw.

In independent Lithuania, Sruoga served in the Lithuanian Ministry of Foreign Affairs. From 1920 to 1922 Sruoga acted as a secretary of a committee that negotiated the Soviet–Lithuanian Peace Treaty in Moscow. From 1925 Sruoga worked as the Lithuanian delegate to Berlin. From 1934 Sruoga was the Lithuanian consul in Tilsit. He was married to Bronė Jazbutytė, with whom he had Marija Jolita Sruogaitė (1934–2016). According to Sruoga's letter to his brother Balys Sruoga, Sruoga did not cooperate with Nazi occupants during the Second World War, and instead worked in local Lithuanian institutions such as the Kaunas district financial department and the social care directorate. From 1940 to 1941 he worked at "food industries in the People's Commissariat", and from 1944 onwards at the "Social Development Department of the Executive Committee of the City of Kaunas". After the death of Balys Sruoga in 1947, Juozas took care of his brother's literary work. Juozas Sruoga's daughter Jolita also continued the task, eventually gifting a secret manuscript of the novel Forest of the Gods to the Maironis Lithuanian literature museum.

Sruoga died in Kaunas on 12 December 1957.

== Bibliography ==
- Samulionis, Algis (1986). Balys Sruoga (in Lithuanian). Vilnius: Vaga Publishers.
