= Liudas =

Liudas is a masculine Lithuanian given name. Notable people with the name include:

- Liudas Gira (1884–1946), Lithuanian poet, writer and literary critic
- Liudas Jakavicius-Grimalauskas (1910–1998), Lithuanian pianist, composer and theatre director
- Liudas Mažylis, Lithuanian politician
- Liudas Rumbutis (born 1955), Lithuanian-Belarusian footballer and manager
- Liudas Vaineikis (1869–1938), Lithuanian physician and book smuggler
- Liudas Vilimas (1912–1966), Lithuanian painter
