= Saulius Mykolaitis =

- Born: Saulius Mykolaitis; January 15, 1966
- Origin: Ramygala, Lithuania
- Died: February 18, 2006 (aged 40)
- Genres: theatre, sung poetry
- Occupations: Actor, theatre director, composer, vocalist.
- Years active: 1994–2006

Saulius Mykolaitis (January 15, 1966 – February 18, 2006) was a Lithuanian director, actor, and singer-songwriter.

== Life ==
Saulius Mykolaitis was born in Ramygala, a small town near Panevėžys in Lithuania. Orphaned as a young child, he was raised by his two older brothers, Sigitas and Darius, who bought Saulius his first guitar when he was just seven years old.

Saulius Mykolaitis started writing his own songs while still at school, and went on to study at the Music Academy of Lithuania in Vilnius. Initially he chose singing, but soon moved to acting.

From 1988 to 1992, Saulius Mykolaitis studied under Professor Dalia Tamulevičiūtė and received a Bachelor's degree in Stage Art (Acting). In 1995 he started his Master's degree and in 1996 acquired qualification as a theatre director.

== Acting ==
=== Theatre ===
From 1992 to 1994, Mykolaitis worked in Vilnius' National Mažasis (The Small) Theatre. From 1994 until the end of his life Saulius Mykolaitis was a member of the Lithuanian National Drama Theatre and frequently collaborated with Oskaras Koršunovas Theatre.

Through the years Mykolaitis created over 20 roles. The most famous were Mercutio in K. Antanėlis' musical "Love and Death in Verona" (dir. Eimuntas Nekrošius), Roberto Zucco in Bernard-Marie Koltès' eponymous play (dir. Oskaras Koršunovas), Azzazelo in Mikhail Bulgakov's "The Master and Margarita" (dir. Oskaras Koršunovas), The Painter in Howard Barker's "The Europeans" (dir. Lary Zappia).

=== Film & TV ===
Mykolaitis had three supporting film roles. The last one was in "Dievų miškas" (Forest of the Gods, 2005), a feature directed by Algimantas Puipa. Mykolaitis was however better known for playing one of the protagonists, a secret service man Tomas, in 2001 TV series "Gedimino, 11".

== Directing ==
Saulius Mykolaitis also achieved success as a theatre director. His most important plays were "Stop Machine" and "The City". He played leads in both.

"Stop Machine" was based on Russian satirist's Daniil Charms' life and short stories, a performance that combined physical and psychological theatre. "Once Petrushevsky broke his watch and asked to call Pushkin. Pushkin came, took a look at Petrushevsky's watch and put it back on the chair. "So what do you say, brother Pushkin?" – asked Petrushevsky. "Stop machine," – said Pushkin." (Anecdotes from the life of Pushkin)

- Daniil Charms. Stop Machine (Stop Mašina). LNDT, 2000
- Anton Chekhov. Ivanov (Ivanovas). LNDT, 2002
- A. A. Milne. Winnie The Pooh (Mikė Pūkuotukas). Keistuolių theatre, 2003
- Yevgeni Grishkovets. The City (Miestas). OKT (Theatre of Oskaras Koršunovas), 2005
- Antoine de Saint-Exupéry. The Little Prince (Mažasis Princas). LNDT, 2006

== Music ==
Saulius Mykolaitis wrote music for various theatre plays for children, some of which was posthumously collected in an album called "Nupiešti Pasaulį" ("To Draw the World") (2006). Outside of theatre, Mykolaitis wrote and performed songs in the genre of sung poetry, playing the guitar. He debuted live at an acoustic music evening in 2002, and his first solo album "Nieko Nepasakyta" ("Nothing's Said") was released in autumn 2005.

- "Nieko Nepasakyta" ("Nothing's Said") (2005)
- "Nupiešti Pasaulį" ("To Draw the World") (2006) – music for children
- "Debesys" ("Clouds") (2007) – non-professional live recordings and demos
- "Balta Diena" ("White Day") (2016) – shorter version of "Clouds"
- "Kelio Pradžia" ("Journey's Beginning") (2018) – early demos
- "Mykolaitis" (2021) (LP)

== Death ==
Mykolaitis committed suicide in 2006 in Vilnius, Lithuania. He is buried in his native Ramygala.
