= Edward Pawłowicz =

Polish-Lithuanian teacher

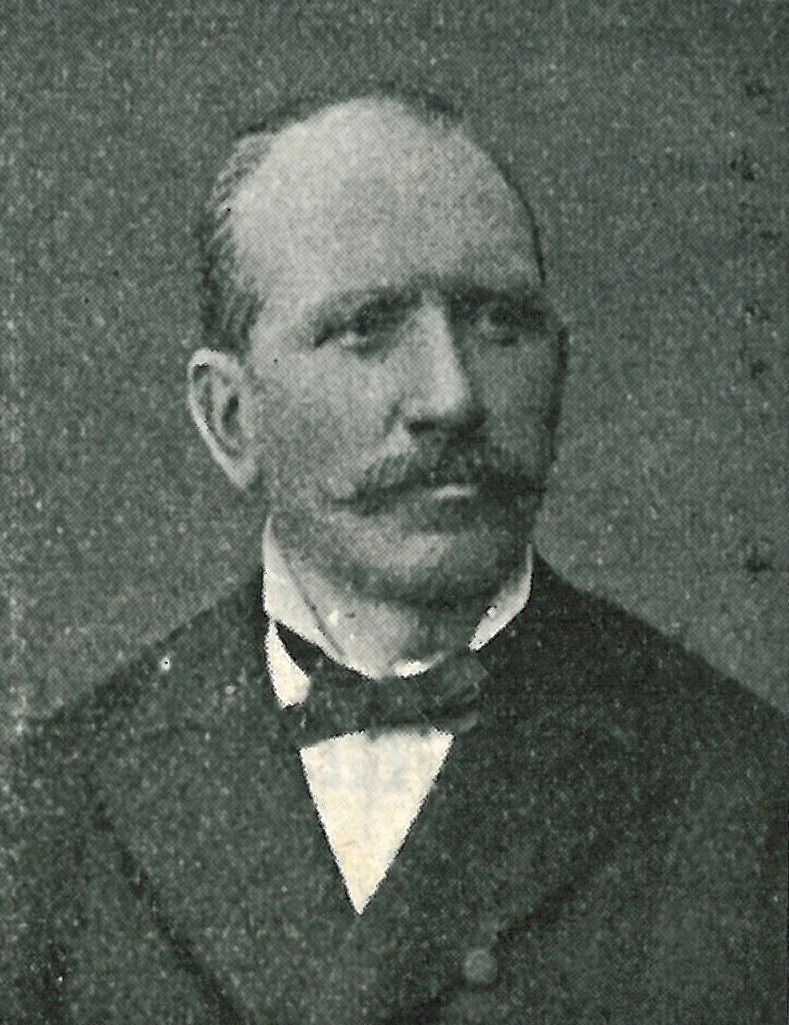
- Born: March 30, 1837; Lapgiriai, Lithuania (then Russian Empire)
- Died: June 1, 1895 (aged 58); Pavirvytis, Lithuania (then Russian Empire)
- Resting place: Viekšniai Old Cemetery
- Education: Imperial University of Dorpat
- Occupation: Educator

Edward Pawłowicz (Lithuanian: Edvardas Paulavičius; 30 March 1837 – 1895) was a Polish-Lithuanian teacher and director of the Private Real School in Kalisz, as well as a prominent educational activist.

== Biography ==
He was born in 1837 at the Lapgiriai Manor, in the Lithuanian region of Samogitia, to the Samogitian noble Paulavičiai/Pawłowicz family of the Przyjaciel coat of arms. He was the son of Józef Bernard Pawłowicz, an estate administrator, and Maria née Dokalski. In 1856, he graduated from the gymnasium in Šiauliai and began studying medicine at the University of Moscow, before transferring to the Imperial University of Dorpat, where he pursued studies in mathematics and natural sciences. In 1861, he earned a degree of candidate of sciences and began working as a teacher at the Men's Gymnasium in Kalisz.

In 1873, Pawłowicz resigned from his position and founded a private four-grade progymnasium, which was transformed in 1875 into a six-grade Private Real School. The school soon became known as the "Pawłowicz School." He was part of a group of intellectuals in Kalisz who regularly met at the Berlin Hotel on Mariańska Street and made efforts to animate the cultural life of the city. Pawłowicz was a member of the Charity Society, the Music Society in Kalisz, and the Society for the Encouragement of Fine Arts in Warsaw.

He led the school until 1883, when he left Kalisz to settle in the inherited estate of Pavirvytis in Samogitia. The school was taken over by Konstanty Jerzykowicz, and in 1893 it was nationalized by the Tsarist government. Mykolas Biržiška, in his memoirs, describes the "Polish Flying Library" run in Pavirvytis by Pawłowicz, who made his extensive collection of Polish books available to the local landowners. A significant part of this collection Pawłowicz had received when leaving his school in Kalisz.

Edward Pawłowicz died in 1895.

== Family ==
He was married to Maria Szaniawska, daughter of Józef Szaniawski, a Kalisz archivist and historian. Together they had four sons: Jan, Kazimierz, Józef, and Edward, and five daughters: Maria, married to Życki, Jadwiga, wife of Kazimierz Dowgird, Aniela, wife of Jan Venordin, Zofia, and Wanda, wife of Leonard Micuta.

Kazimierz Pawłowicz completed engineering studies at the Jagiellonian University in Kraków and amassed wealth as the manager of a brick factory in the Congress Poland. In independent Poland, he became the founder of the Garden City Czerniaków (now part of the Sadyba district) in Warsaw.

Edward Pawłowicz's grandchildren included, among others, the Polish writer and traveler Bohdan Pawłowicz (son of Kazimierz), Polish economist and World War II veteran Wacław Micuta (son of Wanda) and the Lithuanian historian Vanda Daugirdaitė-Sruogienė (born Wanda Dowgierd, daughter of Jadwiga).
