= Maxim Stepanov =

Soviet komkor (corps commander)

- Born: August 1893; Novaya village, Suzhdalsky Uyezd, Vladimir Governorate, Russian Empire
- Died: 25 September 1945 (aged 52) Kotlas, Soviet Union
- Allegiance: Russian Empire; Soviet Union
- Branch: Imperial Russian Army; Soviet Red Army
- Service years: 1915–1917 (Russian Empire); 1918–1938 (Soviet Union)
- Conflicts: World War I Russian Civil War

Maxim Osipovich Stepanov (August 1893 – 25 September 1945) was a Soviet komkor (corps commander). He fought for the Imperial Russian Army in World War I before going over to the Bolsheviks during the subsequent civil war. He received the Order of the Red Banner twice (1920, 1922). During the Great Purge, Stepanov's colleague division commissar Peter Maximovich Feldman (standing to his left in the group photo behind Alexander Yegorov) was executed on August 22, 1938. On November 28, 1938, the Central Committee of the Communist Party of the Soviet Union made the decision to dismiss Stepanov from the military, which was carried out the next day. He was arrested on December 9, 1938. He initially pleaded guilty to the charges he was accused of, but then withdrew his plea. He was convicted on May 31, 1939 and sentenced to 20 years imprisonment. He survived the Second World War, but did not participate in it. He died shortly after the end of the Soviet–Japanese War of 1945 in a prison camp in Arkhangelsk Oblast. After the death of Joseph Stalin, he was posthumously rehabilitated on June 30, 1956.

== Early life and World War I ==
Stepanov was born in August 1893 in the village of Novaya, Suzhdalsky Uyezd, Vladimir Governorate to a peasant family. He graduated from a two-year school in 1906 and worked as a knife sharpener before being drafted into the Imperial Russian Army in 1915 during World War I. Stepanov became an unter-ofitser upon graduation from a training command in the latter year. He fought as part of the 5th and 12th Armies of the Western Front. After the February Revolution Stepanov became chairman of the regimental committee of the 143rd Dorogobuzh Infantry Regiment, and in November became deputy secretary of the divisional committee. He was demobilized as a feldfebel in February 1918, subsequently working as secretary of a volost executive committee and as an organizer of the committee of the poor of the Zimin factory in Moscow Governorate.

== Interwar period ==
He attended the 16th Congress of the All-Union Communist Party (Bolsheviks) from 26 June to 13 July 1930. On 26 November 1935, he was promoted to Komdiv when the Red Army introduced personal military ranks. Stepanov was promoted to Komkor on 22 February 1938.

== Arrest and imprisonment ==
Stepanov was arrested on 9 December 1938, and sentenced to twenty years of imprisonment in the gulag on 31 May 1939, charged with participating in a military conspiracy. According to an account by historian Michael Parrish, on 30 March 1939, Stepanov wrote a letter to Kliment Voroshilov in which he told him that between 40 and 45 percent of chemical officers serving in military districts and 60 to 65 percent of those with corps and divisions had been arrested in the Great Purge. Voroshilov forwarded the letter to the Special Department, and Stepanov was arrested.

While in the gulag, Stepanov repeatedly wrote requests to various institutions requesting review of his case, but was turned down each time. Both of his sons, Boris and Vladimir, fought in combat during World War II, and during the war Stepanov himself requested to be sent to the front, even as a private, but was again denied. He died at the Intalag on 25 September 1945, and was posthumously rehabilitated on 30 June 1956.
