= Forest of the Gods (film) =

Lithuanian World War II film (2005)

Forest of the Gods (Dievų miškas)
- Forest of the Gods Film Poster
- Directed by: Algimantas Puipa
- Screenplay by: Ričardas Gavelis; Algimantas Puipa
- Based on: Forest of the Gods by Balys Sruoga
- Produced by: Robertas Urbonas
- Starring: Valentinas Masalskis; Steven Berkoff; Liubomiras Laucevičius; Rolandas Boravskis; Šarūnas Puidokas; Robertas Urbonas; Saulius Mykolaitis; Monika Bičiūnaitė
- Cinematography: Algimantas Mikutenas
- Edited by: John Grove
- Music by: Kipras Masanauskas
- Distributed by: Garsų pasaulio įrašai
- Release date: 23 September 2005
- Running time: 120 minutes
- Countries: Lithuania; United Kingdom
- Language: Lithuanian
- Budget: €1,700,000 EUR(est.)

Forest of the Gods (Lithuanian: Dievų miškas) is a 2005 film, directed by Algimantas Puipa, based on the 1957 Balys Sruoga novel of the same name.

== Plot ==
This story is about one man — who is an artist and an intellectual — imprisoned by two brutal regimes, the Nazis and the Soviets. 'The Professor' is a man who lives by his own personal version of the Ten Commandments. After miraculously surviving imprisonment in a Nazi concentration camp through a bit of ironic fate, he writes a memoir of his life, which becomes the target of the Soviet censors.

== Reception ==
The film became the most profitable film released after Lithuania restored its independence.

The 98-year-old Vladislovas Telksnys, the only Lithuanian survivor of the Stutthof concentration camp in 2013, referred to the movie as "a piece of nonsense". In particular he referred to the scene depicting a Gestapo officer marching and a woman with an umbrella following behind. According to Telksnys, "there were no such things".
