= Minlag =

Soviet political prison camp

Minlag or Mineralny Camp Directorate (Минлаг, Минеральный лагерь, Особый лагерь № 1 (Special Camp no. 1), Особлаг № 1) was an MVD special camp for political prisoners within the Gulag system of the Soviet Union. It was established on February 28, 1948 based on the Inta labor camp (Inta ITL), Komi ASSR. In 1954, after Stalin's death it was reorganized into an ordinary Mineralny Corrective Labor Camp (Минеральный ИТЛ, Mineralny ITL).

== Notable inmates ==
- Jaan Kross, Estonian writer
- Viktoras Petkus, Lithuanian political activist and Soviet dissident
- Oleksii Brys, Ukrainian Insurgent Army fighter
- Stasys Ignatavičius, Lithuanian engineer, member of anti-Soviet resistance
- Vendelín Javorka, Slovak Catholic priest, founder of the Pontifical Russian College (Russicum)
- uk:Грицяк Євген Степанович
- ru:Гогитидзе, Герман Иосифович
- ru:Данилов, Виктор Петрович (священник)
- ru:Дунский, Юлий Теодорович
- Aleksei Kapler, second sentence, after serving in Vorkutlag
- ru:Корак, Борис Яковлевич
- ru:Смеляков, Ярослав Васильевич
- ru:Фирсова, Софья Михайловна
- ru:Фрид, Валерий Семёнович
