= Rygos naujienos =

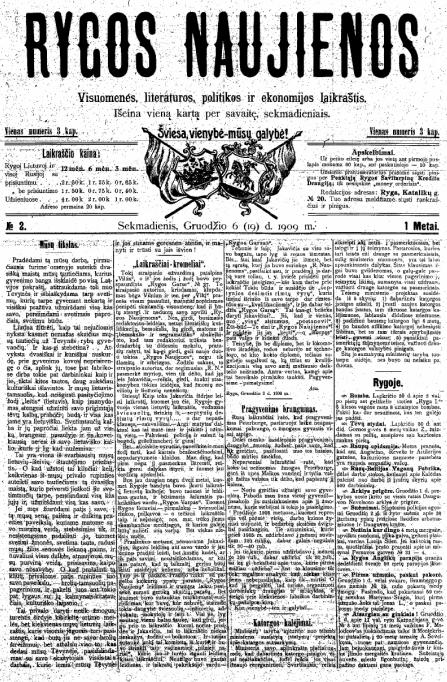
- Front page for December 6, 1909
- Type: Weekly newspaper
- Founder: Liudvikas Jakavičius (Lietuvanis)
- Founded: December 6, 1909
- Ceased publication: July 11, 1915
- Language: Lithuanian

Rygos naujenos (literally: news of Riga) was a Lithuanian-language newspaper printed in Riga, Latvia, from December 29, 1909 to July 11, 1915. Liberal in political orientation, but nationalist (pro-Lithuanian) and anti-communist, the paper was the most widely circulated newspaper amongst Lithuanian citizens residing in Latvia. It was founded and edited by Liudvikas Jakavičius.

== Publication history ==
Its first issue was published on December 29, 1909, and it was issued every week until July 11, 1915. The newspaper was printed in black and white and its main emphasis was Lithuanian politics, economics, literature and the social life of notable Lithuanian nationals living abroad. The newspaper was liberal, but nationalist (pro-Lithuanian) and anti-communist in political ideology.

The most distinguished contributors of Rygos naujenos were Tadas Balanda; Zigmas Gaidamavičius (poet); Konstantinas Jasiukaitis (writer); Jonas Krikščiūnas (poet); Kazys Puida (writer); Ona Pleirytė (writer); Balys Sruoga (writer); Juozas Petrulis (historian) and Kostas Stiklius (journalist). The printing house which produced the newspaper, called "Lietuvos Knygynas," was located in 20 Kataliku Street in Riga, Latvia.
