= MS Chrobry =

Transatlantic passenger liner

Coordinates: 68°03′N 14°46′E

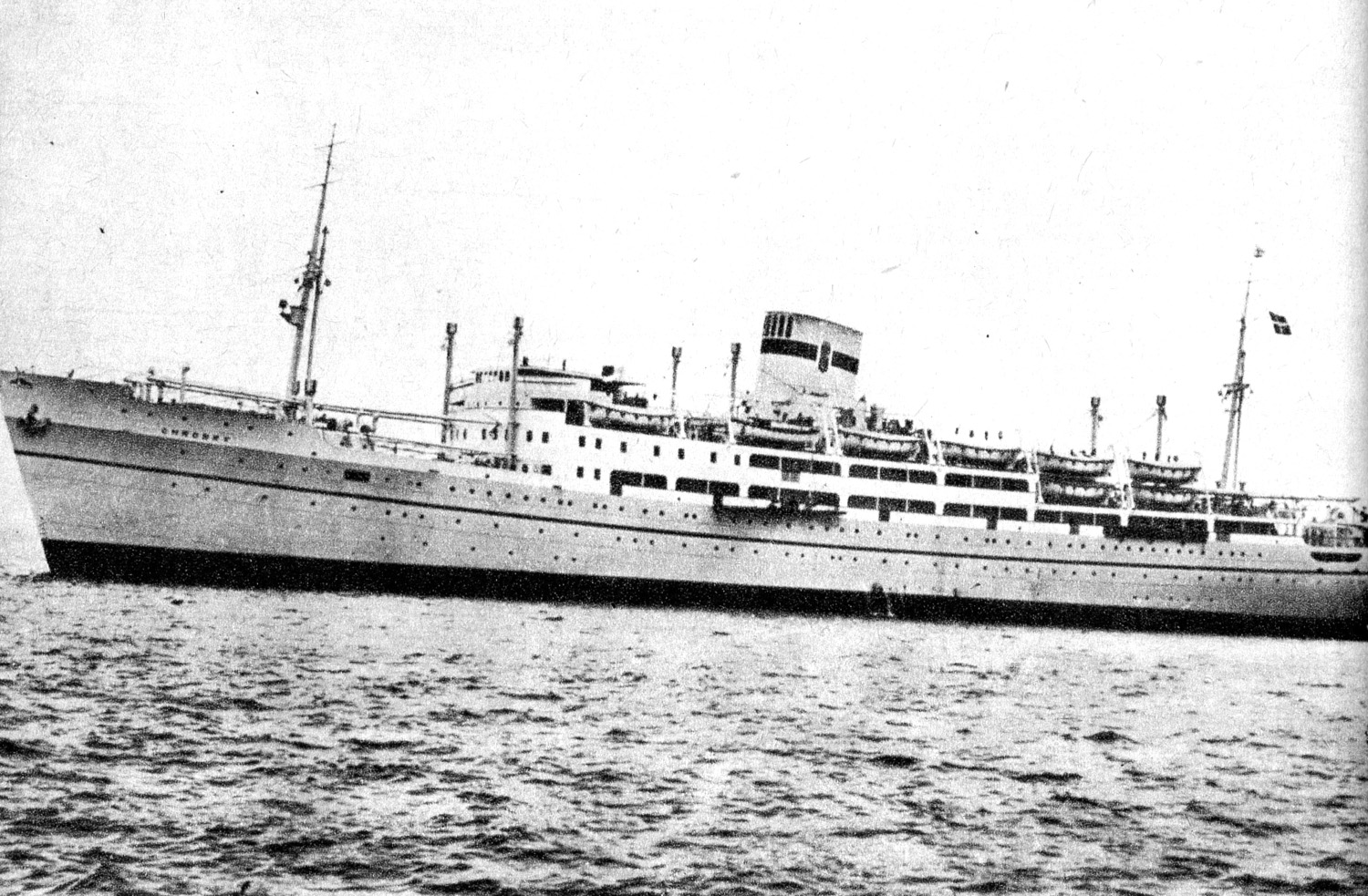

History

Poland
- Name: Chrobry
- Namesake: Bolesław I Chrobry
- Owner: Gdynia-America Line – GAL
- Port of registry: Gdynia
- Builder: Nakskov SV
- Yard number: 89
- Launched: 24 February 1939
- Completed: July 1939
- Commissioned: 1939
- Out of service: 14 May 1940
- Fate: Scuttled in 1940 by British torpedo from HMS Ark Royal after being damaged by German aircraft a day before

General characteristics
- Tonnage: 11400 GRT; 7100 NRT
- Length: 154.2 m (505 ft 11 in)
- Beam: 20.3 m (66 ft 7 in)
- Draft: 8.3 m (27 ft 3 in)
- Installed power: 11250 hp
- Speed: 17 knots (31 km/h; 20 mph)
- Capacity: 1167 passengers total

MS Chrobry was a transatlantic passenger liner, and was the last pre-war new build for the Polish Merchant Navy. She was built for the Gdynia-Ameryka Linie Żeglugowe S.A. (Gdynia-America Line – GAL).

== Purpose ==
The ship was intended for the Poland–South America route to replace the aging SS Kościuszko and the SS Pułaski. Built in Denmark, it was the second (and larger) of a pair of ships, the other being the MS Sobieski. The MS Chrobry was named in honour of the first Polish king Bolesław I Chrobry. The name of the King means "Braveheart".

== Maiden Voyage & Exile ==
On its maiden voyage from Gdynia to Buenos Aires, it carried 1,167 passengers. The ship sailed on the 29 July 1939 and arrived uneventfully in Buenos Aires on the 19 August 1939. Among the Polish personalities on board were Senator Jan Rembielinski, the ambassador Władysław Mazurkiewicz, author Bohdan Pawłowicz, and the young writers Witold Gombrowicz and Czesław Straszewicz, who had been invited along to promote the ship.

The ship left Buenos Aires on the 24th of August on the return leg of its maiden passenger voyage and was near Pernambuco in Brazil, when World War II broke out. Initially the ship stayed at the Brazilian port for 40 days with the passengers having disembarked in Brazil rather than return to Poland. Then the essentially stateless ship sailed with her crew of 264. There were 20 women and 14 boy apprentices from a Polish sea school, aged between 16 and 18, among the party. After wandering the Atlantic for three weeks the ship diverted to Southampton in the UK.

As a transatlantic liner she made only one transatlantic voyage, never returning to her home port of Gdynia.

== Wartime Service & Fate ==
During the war the ship was rebuilt in Britain to become a troop transport. The ship was used to transport the West Nova Scotia Regiment from Halifax, Nova Scotia, Canada to the U.K., embarking on 21 December 1939, sailing the next day and arriving in Gourock on the river Clyde, Scotland on the 29 Dec 1939.

The ship was used during the Norwegian Campaign, in the area around Narvik. On 14 May 1940 she sailed from Tjeldsundet transporting British troops to Bodø. Just before midnight German dive bombers attacked the ship three times in the middle of the Vestfjorden, setting the ship on fire, exploding ammunition, and killing several army officers and men. One of the escorts, the destroyer HMS Wolverine, took off 700 survivors from the ship, while the other escort, the sloop HMS Stork, stood on guard and drove off other German aircraft, then took off the remaining survivors. Both escorts, loaded with survivors, sailed for Harstad.

The abandoned Chrobry was sunk by aircraft from the aircraft carrier HMS Ark Royal on 16 May. A considerable amount of equipment went down with the ship.
