= Liudvikas Jakavičius =

Lithuanian writer and journalist (1871–1941)

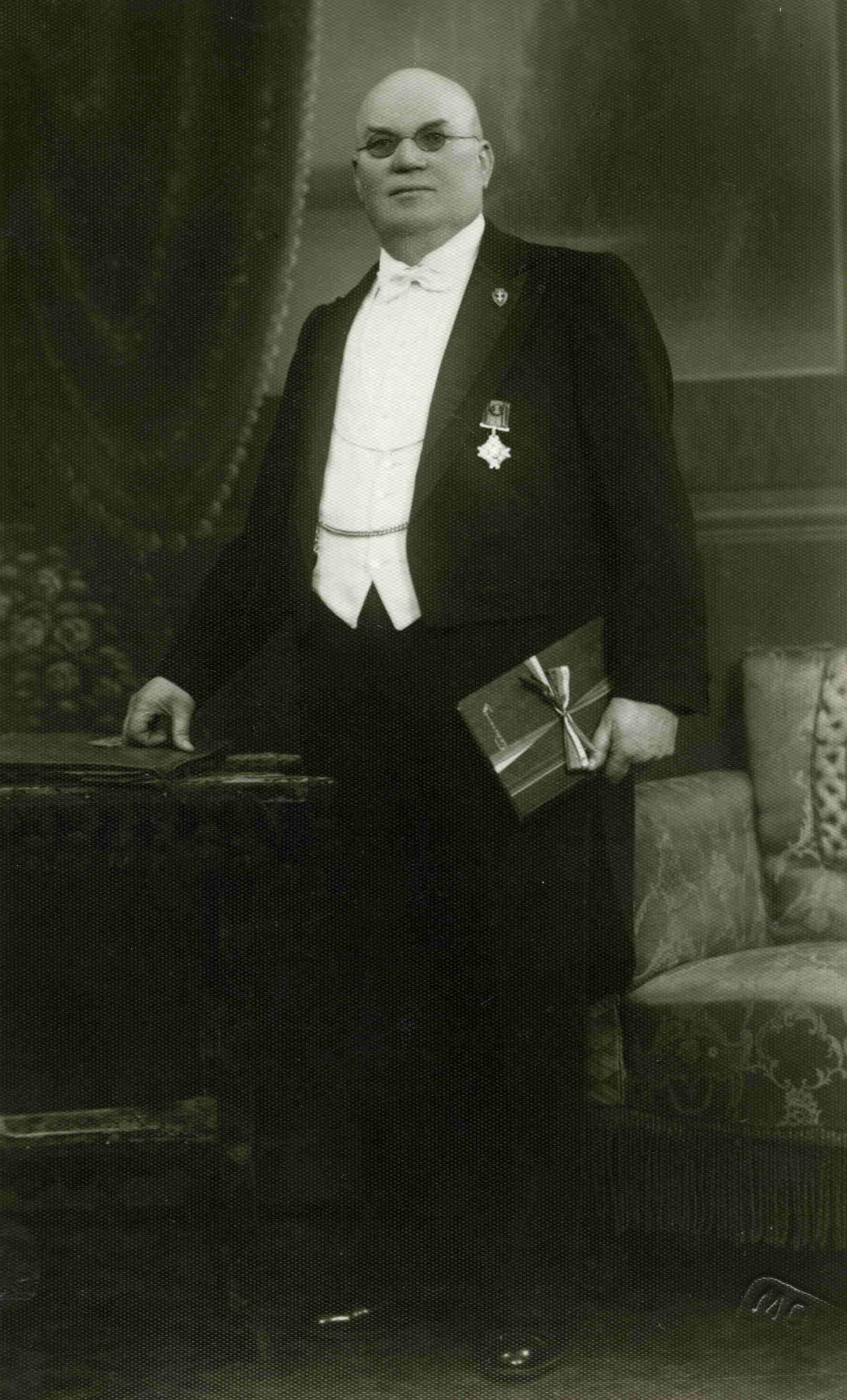
- Liudvikas Jakavičius – Lietuvanis in 1938
- Born: 22 June 1871; Akmene, Lithuania
- Died: 20 August 1941 (aged 70)
- Occupations: Banker, journalist, writer, publisher, theatre director and actor
- Spouse: Honorata Grimalauskaitė-Jakavičienė
- Children: Gražina Jakavičiūtė-Grimalauskaitė Šaltenienė, Liudas Jakavičius-Grimalauskas and Donatas Bronislovas Jakavičius-Grimalauskas

Liudvikas Jakavičius (22 June 1871 – 20 August 1941) was a Lithuanian writer, journalist, publisher, theatre director, banker and nobleman. He was born in Akmenė (Lithuania) and died in Anykščiai (Lithuania).

== Biography ==
Jakavičius studied drama and spoke nine languages (Lithuanian, Latvian, German, Polish, Finnish, Swedish, Czech, Russian and Latin). He used the pseudonym of Lietuvanis and represented informal literature, as a man who spread forbidden Lithuanian print, worked in several newspapers and in radio. Unfortunately, most of his works disappeared during the occupation of the Soviet regime after the Second World War. So he was rarely mentioned as the largest private publisher in the Lithuania of interwar.

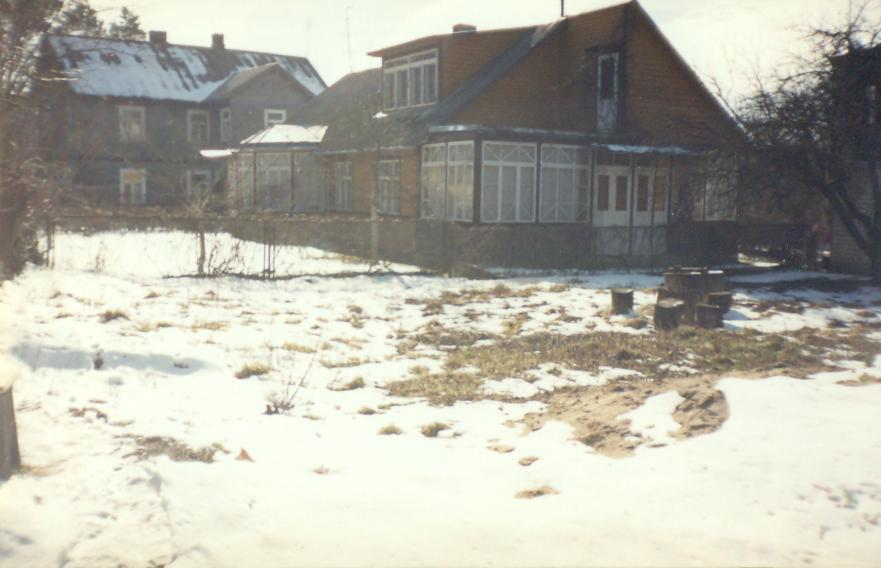
House where Liudvikas Jakavičius – Lietuvanis died in 1941 (Anykščiai, Lithuania). Picture year 2011.

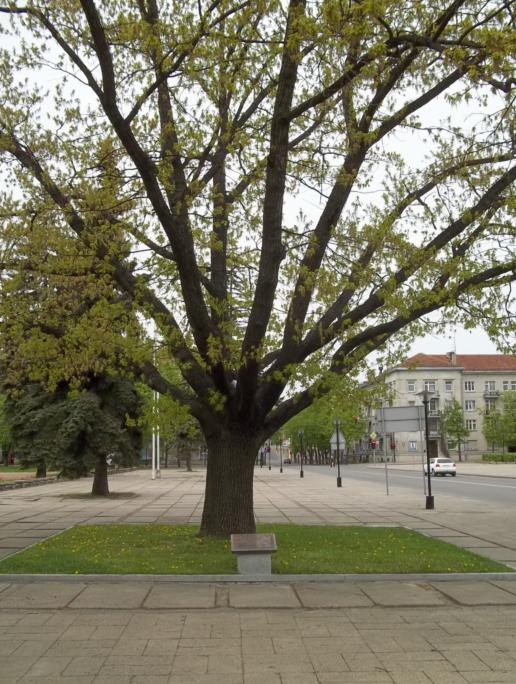
Tree planted by Liudvikas Jakavičius – Lietuvanis in 1929 in pro to the freedom of speech (Šiauliai, Lithuania). Picture year 2011.

But now, the most important historians and museologists of Lithuania like Almantas Šlivinskas, Leopoldas Rozga or Leonas Peleckis-Kaktavičius, consider him one of the most important writers and publishers of Lithuania. He produced more than two million books and performed more than 280 plays in 1898–1938. From 1888 to 1891 he worked in Šiauliai (Lithuania) as a journalist and writer. In 1891, he settled in Riga (Latvia), where he started working as judge and administrator of the railway company. In 1904, he opened his own printing house (AB Lietuvos Knygynas) and his own bookstore in Riga (Latvia). In 1909, he founded the newspaper Rygos naujienos which maintained its activities until 1915. He also collaborated with other newspapers and journalists like his friend Antanas Smetona (writer, journalist and the first president of the Republic of Lithuania). It should be mentioned that Antanas Smetona wrote about Liudvikas Jakavičius in his memories, written in Cleveland, Ohio, US, in 1960. In 1910, Jakavičius founded The Society of Lithuanian Theatre of Riga. In 1914, he financed the construction of the Lithuanian Theater of Riga. That same year he founded the Lithuanian–Latvian Savings Bank. His bank grew up rapidly, but it was expropriated in 1915 by the State Bank of the Russian Empire, as a result of the beginning of the First World War. In 1916, all his business was paralyzed and confiscated by the outbreak of the First World War and he changed his residence to Saint Petersburg (Russia). He bought 15,000 USD (equivalent to US$350,000 in 2014) in printing equipment and moved the machinery in secret to Saint Petersburg, where he continued with his printing house spreading Lithuanian language.

Jakavičius was a book smuggler – transported Lithuanian language books printed in the Latin alphabet into Lithuanian-speaking areas of the Russian Empire where Lithuanian press was banned.

In 1919, Jakavičius returned to Lithuania and re-opened his printing house (AB Lietuvos Knygynas) and inaugurated five bookstores in the major cities of Lithuania, establishing itself as the largest publisher of Lithuania. In 1924, he founded the Society for Ethical Culture. In 1938, he was awarded by President, Antanas Smetona, with the Great Grand Cross of the Order of Lithuanian Grand Duke Gediminas. In 1940, sick and depressed by the Soviet occupation of his country, Jakavičius moved to Anykščiai (Lithuania), where his father-in-law, Juozas Grimalauskas, bought a little village with a private lake, a mansion and nine houses (one for each of his children). Grimalauskas bought this little village because of his bankruptcy in Poland by the Great Depression in 1929. Jakavičius died in 1941 in the lands of his wife Honorata Grimalauskaitė-Jakavičienė.

In 2011, his great-grandson Liudvikas Jakavičius–Grimalauskas announced to the press that he will open in the near future the "Liudvikas Jakavičius – Lietuvanis Museum" in honor to his great-grandfather Jakavičius. The museum will be about the Second World War and about the Soviet Holocaust that caused more victims than Nazism. Currently, there is a permanent exhibition of the life and work of Liudvikas Jakavičius in the Siauliai Ausros Museum (Šiauliai, Lithuania). Also, there is about 400 works (books, newspapers, postcards, etc.) written and printed by Liudvikas Jakavičius in the Martynas Mažvydas National Library of Lithuania (Vilnius, Lithuania).

== Family ==
He was married to Honorata Grimalauskaitė-Jakavičienė, a Lithuanian–Polish noblewoman and public figure. Honorata's father, Juozas Grimalauskas, was a wealthy Lithuanian, whose family was close to the Drucki-Lubecki dynasty of the old Princedom of Druckiai (Belarus), related to the Lithuanian House of Gediminas and the Polish-Lithuanian House of Jagiellon, and contributed to the foundation of the National Bank of Poland. Liudvikas and Honorata had five children (Gražina; Liudas; Donatas Bronislovas, Juozas and Artūras) all of which were artists devoted to music and theatre. His eldest son was Liudas Jakavicius-Grimalauskas, President of the Siauliai Drama Theatre, composer of the first Lithuanian tango (Sutemos tango) and a famous pianist, disciple of the Russian musician Dmitry Kabalevsky. His only daughter was the actress Gražina Jakavičiūtė-Grimalauskaitė Šaltenienė, remembered by her performances at the Lithuanian National Drama Theatre. His son Donatas Bronislovas Jakavičius-Grimalauskas was a Stradivarius violinist who played in several national orchestras, including the Lithuanian National Opera, the ballet orchestra Kaunas Philharmonic Orchestra, the Royal Concertgebouw Orchestra, the Berlin Philharmonic Orchestra, the Berlin Radio Symphony Orchestra, the Vienna State Opera Orchestra, the Belgrade Philharmonic Orchestra and the Venezuela National Symphony Orchestra.

== Most prominent works ==
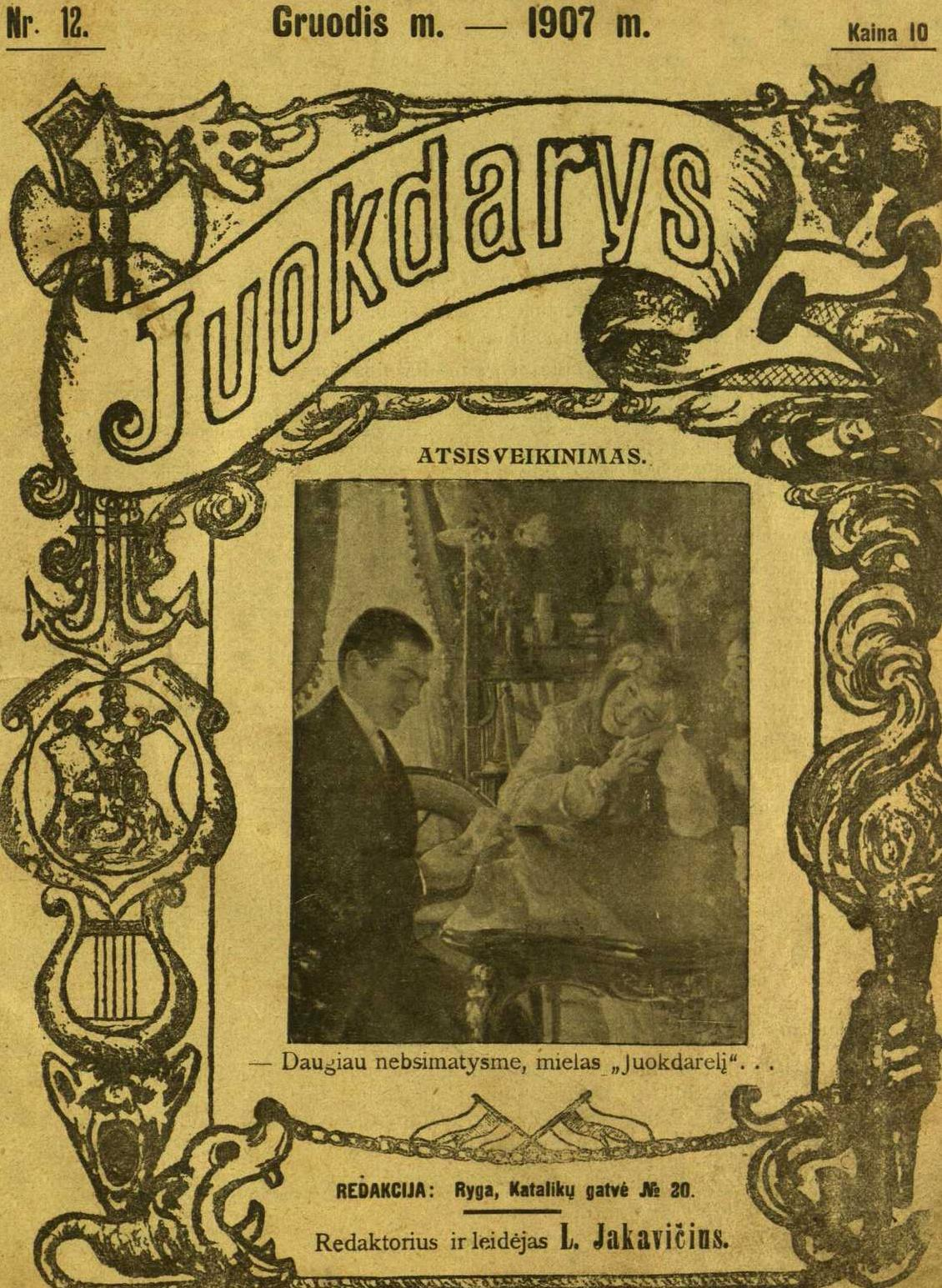
Book written by Liudvikas Jakavičius–Lietuvanis in 1907

- 1905 – Lietuvių naminis draugas
- 1907 – Juokdarys
- 1907 – Juokų kalendorius
- 1909 – Artistų patarėjas
- 1909 – Juokai be pinigų
- 1924 – Teismas
- 1927 – Linksmųjų monologų pasakotojas
- 1927 – Džiaugsmas per ašaras
- 1929 – Juokų milteliai: linksmūs vakarėliams paįvairinti kupletai su gaidomis
- 1929 – Meilės ir tarnybinių laiškų
- 1932 – Ką turi žinoti jauna mergaitė prieš ištekėsiant
- 1936 – Linksmų valandų dainelės
- 1939 – Lietuvos dievai
