= Intalag =

Former forced labour camp near Inta, Russia

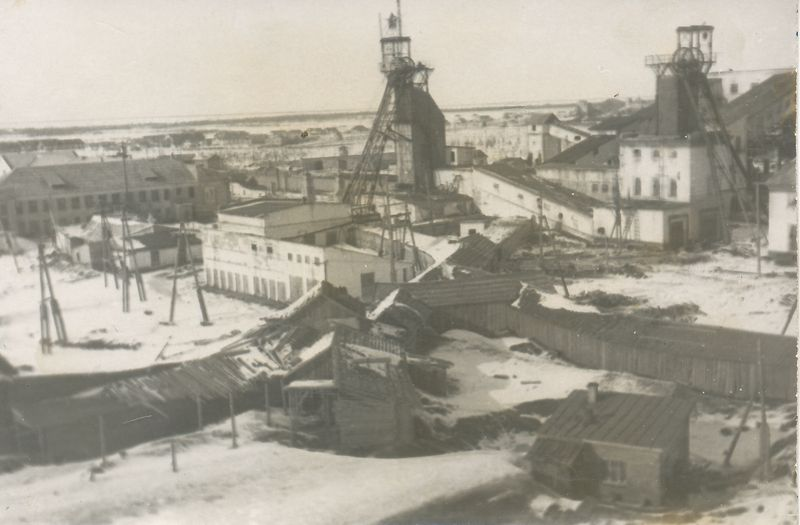
Mine number 9

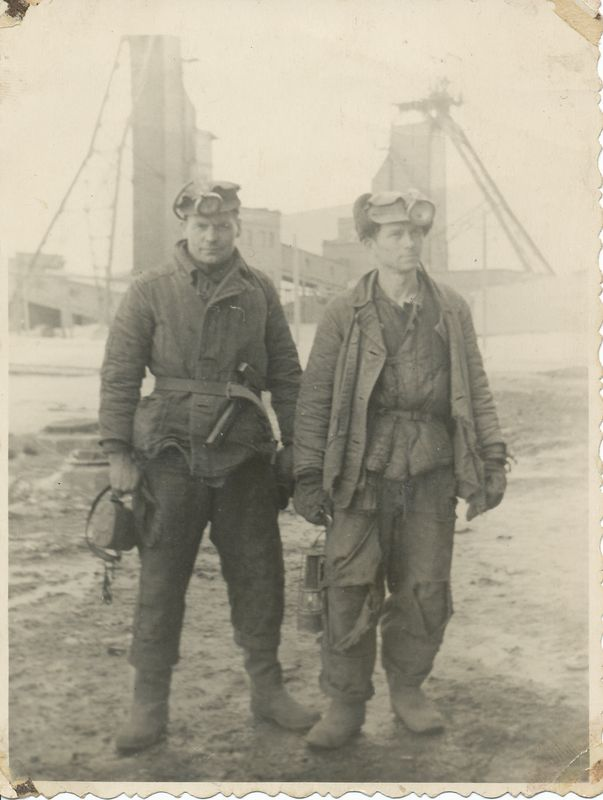
Two Lithuanian political prisoners in Intalag (1955) ready to go into a coal mine

The Inta Corrective Labor Camp or Intalag (Russian: Инти́нский исправи́тельно-трудово́й ла́герь, Инталаг, romanized: Intínskiy ispravítel'no-trudovóy láger', also abbreviated Intinlag, Intlag, and Intastroy) was a forced labor camp of the Gulag, which existed between 1941 and 1948 near the town of Inta in the Komi Autonomous Soviet Socialist Republic. Prisoners at the camp were mainly engaged in the mining of local coal deposits.

== History ==
Intalag was established on 17 November 1941 by being separated from Vorkutlag. Despite its name, the camp was not actually located at Inta until 1942, being initially located at Vorkuta. The first camp commander was Captain Mikhail Savich Zdunis, who led it until 17 July 1942, and it was subordinated to the General Directorate of Railway Construction Camps (GULZHDS). The camp's prisoners were tasked with mining the Inta coal deposit and building and operating (from 11 September 1942) the Inta Central Electric System. On 27 July, Senior Lieutenant V.P. Sokolov took command of the camp, replacing Zdunis. Major G.B. Orlovsky became the camp commander on 26 March 1943. The camp was transferred to the General Directorate of Mining and Metallurgy Camps (GULGMP) on 5 October. Colonel M.I. Khaleyev became camp commander on 16 September 1944, and would command the camp for the rest of its existence. The Shchugorugol camp was split off from Intalag on 15 September 1945, but reabsorbed at the end of 1946. At the beginning of 1947, the number of inmates in the camp reached 20,585, its highest size. On 30 October 1948, the camp was closed down and reorganized into Minlag, an MVD special camp for political prisoners.

== Notable inmates ==
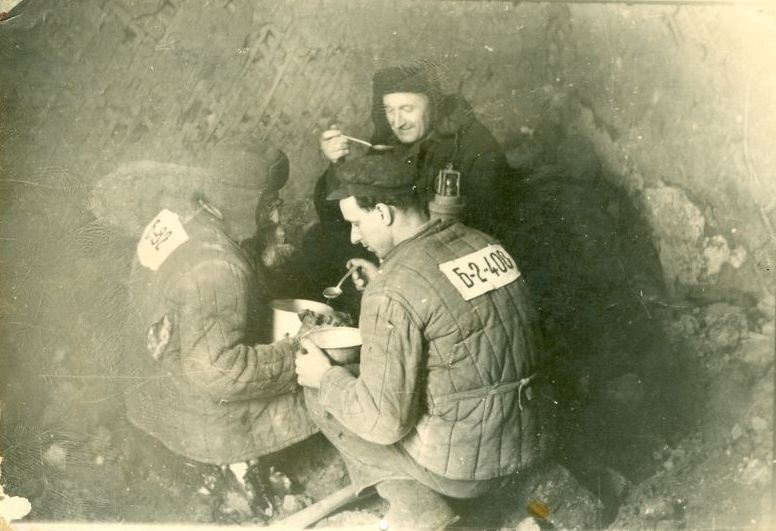
Prisoners at Intalag in 1955, with prisoner numbers on their backs

- Dmitry Dudko, Orthodox priest and former dissident
- Yuli Dunsky, Soviet screenwriter
- Valeri Frid, Soviet screenwriter
- Aleksei Kapler, film director and lover of Svetlana Alliluyeva, Stalin's daughter
- Jaan Kross, Estonian writer, served a sentence in Intalag from 1947-1951, was later sent to Krasnoyarsk krai.
- Nikolay Pechkovsky, opera singer, People's Artist of the RSFSR
- Lina Prokofiev, Spanish singer and the first wife of Russian composer Sergei Prokofiev
- Adolfas Sruoga (1887–1941), one of the first heads of the Lithuanian Post Office
- Maxim Stepanov, Red Army officer (died at Intalag in 1945)
