= Adolfas Sruoga =

Director of Lithuanian postal services (1889–1941)

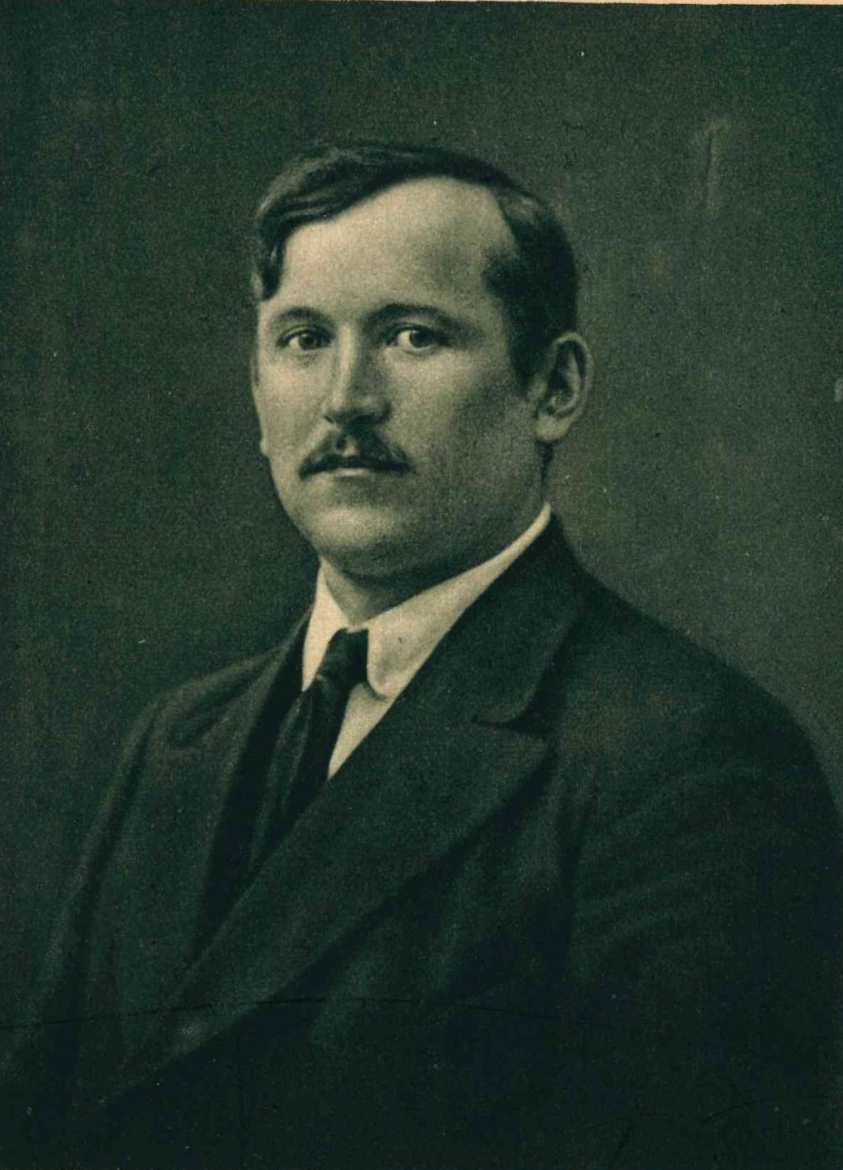
- Adolfas Sruoga in the Lithuanian Album (1921)

Director of Lietuvos paštas
- In office 1927–1933

Personal details
- Born: 12 March 1886 Baibokai, Kovno Governorate, Russian Empire
- Died: 1941 Intalag, Komi ASSR, Soviet Union
- Spouse: Tatjana Sruogienė
- Relatives: Balys Sruoga, Juozas Sruoga, Kazys Sruoga
- Education: Charlottenburg Polytechnic School

Adolfas Sruoga (19 April 1889 – 1941) was the director of Lithuanian postal services in interwar Lithuania. He was the brother of writer Balys Sruoga.

Educated as an electrical engineer at the Charlottenburg Polytechnic School, Sruoga worked in various electric engineering-related posts in the Russian Empire until moving to Lithuania in 1918 to work at the Lithuanian postal service. He was its director from 1927 until 1933 when he was accused of tampering with litas money stamps, accumulating enormous personal wealth. Found guilty of financial manipulation, Sruoga was sentenced to fifteen years of hard labor in 1935, eventually dying in 1941 as a deportee in the Intalag forced labor camp of the Soviet Union.

== Biography ==
=== Early life and career ===
Sruoga was born on 12 March 1886 in the village of Baibokai near Vabalninkas, then part of the Kovno Governorate, Russian Empire. Like his brother Balys Sruoga, Adolfas Sruoga went to a private secret Lithuanian-language school. Sruoga participated in organizing Lithuanian-language theater evenings in 1905. Graduating from a gymnasium in 1906, Sruoga studied electrical engineering at a polytechnic school in Charlottenburg, graduating in 1911.

Sruoga then worked as a telegraph mechanic in Transcaucasia, and also was assigned to head the technical school of the Caucasian Railway Battalion. From 1913 Sruoga worked as a telephone network engineer at the St. Petersburg telephone exchange. Sruoga's brother Balys Sruoga lived with him while the latter studied in St. Petersburg. In 1918, Sruoga returned to Lithuania, Vilnius, where he worked at various technical commissions. Sruoga was married twice.

=== Director of postal service ===
In interwar Lithuania, Sruoga was one of the directors of the Lithuanian postal service. At first, he worked as a co-director, and then as director since 1927. He also led a telegraph and telephone school. Described as a wealthy salon-visiting aphorist, Sruoga owned Justas Paleckis's newspaper Naujas žodis, the Tulpė bookstore in Kaunas, a printing house of the same name, and had shares in other companies.

=== Corruption ===
Sruoga became infamous in 1931 when speculation arose about an illegal business using small, rhombus-shaped stamps. After checking the stamp warehouse and the expeditions department of the postal services, counterfeit stamps worth almost 3 million litas were found. It was established that Sruoga took used stamps from the warehouse and sold them, and instead he placed fake stamps of 3 and 5 litas denominations. Painter Adomas Varnas participated in determining the authenticity of the stamps. In 1933, Sruoga was formally accused of financial manipulation and arrested. Sruoga asserted his innocence by claiming that the stamps were product defects, and that which he had was part of a personal collection.

In 1935, Sruoga was sentenced to fifteen years of hard labor, and his wealth was confiscated. His wife Tatjana Sruogienė, along with their children, fled to Paraguay. Letters of his brother Balys Sruoga reveal the case's negative psychological effect on Balys and the shame it brought the family name.

Sruoga was deported to Intalag in 1941 by Soviet authorities, where he died.

== Bibliography ==
- Samulionis, Algis (1986). Balys Sruoga (in Lithuanian). Vilnius: Vaga Publishers.
