= Bohdan Pawłowicz =

Polish journalist and writer (1899–1967)

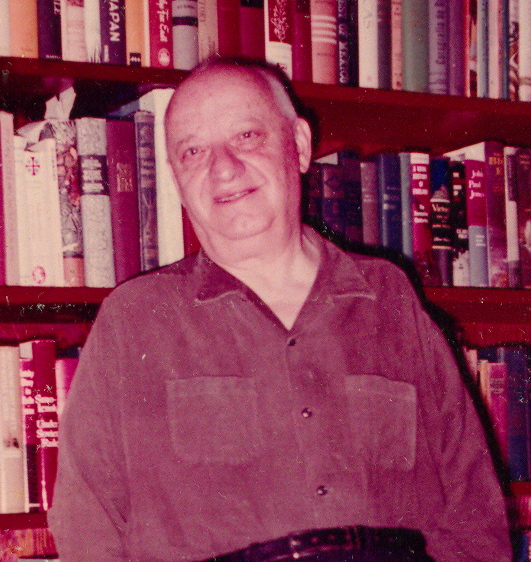
- Born: 2 February 1899; Warsaw, Poland
- Died: May 28, 1967 (aged 68); New York State, US
- Citizenship: Polish, American
- Occupations: scout, military man, writer, journalist, emigration officer, radio broadcaster, professor
- Spouse: Wanda Salmonowicz h Orla (Szaszor) (1901-1987)
- Children: Leszek Kazimierz (1925-2008) and Hanna Antonina (1928-2018)
- Writing career
- Language: Polish, English, Portuguese, Russian
- Period: 20th century
- Notable works: Franek na Szerokim Swiecie. Przygody na morzu i lądzie; Pionierzy; Przez ocean do Polski walczącej; Krew na oceanie (English version: O.R.P. Garland in convoy to Russia)
- Notable awards: Medal Niepodległości, Krzyż Walecznych, British War Medal 1939-1945, Ordem Barão do Rio Branco
- Website: bohdanpawlowicz.org/biographies/bohdan

Bohdan Pawłowicz (February 2, 1899 - May 28, 1967) was a Polish writer, journalist, radio broadcaster and a Polonia activist. He was also a scout, an emigration officer, a military man, a professor of Polish literary history and a globe-trotter.

== Biography ==
Bohdan Pawłowicz h Przyjaciel was born on February 2, 1899, in Warsaw. Poland was then partitioned. His parents were Kazimierz Pawłowicz, a ceramic engineer from Kalisz, and Helena Bożeniec-Jełowicka His grandfather was Edward Pawłowicz, a well-known educational activist.

As a young scout, he joined Piłsudski's Polish Legions during World War I and later, as an officer in the Polish Military Organisation (Polska Organizacja Wojskowa), he took part in the Polish-Soviet War, during which he was wounded and moved to the reserve. He then became responsible for Polish emigration issues. In 1923, he joined the Polish Navy and sailed to South America on the Lwów, the first Polish ship to cross the Equator. In Curitiba, Brazil, he met and married Wanda Salmonowicz h Orla (Szaszor). He brought her to Warsaw, where they had two children: Leszek and Hanna. Between the two World Wars, he finished his studies at the Warsaw School of Fine Arts and mingled with the Arkadia group of literati in Kazimierz, Warsaw. He also worked for the Maritime and Colonial League, and as an emigration inspector was sent on numerous trips on different ships around the world. In the 1930s, he played a very active role in the Polish Radio - in Warsaw, Lwów, Łódź and Toruń.

The outbreak of World War II (September 1, 1939) caught Pawłowicz on the maiden voyage of the MS Chrobry. The ship, already on her return trip, docked in Recife, Brazil, from where she was summoned to serve the British Royal Navy. Unable to return to occupied Poland, Pawłowicz joined the Polish Government in Exile, first in Paris, then in Scotland and London, where he served the Polish Navy Directorate (KMW) as Head of the Press. In 1941, he was the Polish narrator of the documentary film Podnosimy Kotwice, which can be found in its English version "Poles Weigh Anchor" at the Sikorski Museum. In May 1942, he went as war correspondent on ORP Garland, which escorted convoy PQ 16 from Iceland to Murmansk. This experience was largely documented in reports, articles, referenced in books and in his war memoir O.R.P. Garland in Convoy to Russia.

From 1943 until the end of the war, he was appointed Chief of Intelligence in Brazil, officially as assistant to the Navy military attaché at the Polish Legation in Rio de Janeiro. He was released from military service on February 1, 1947. As he would not recognize the Soviet Communist dominance imposed on Poland after the end of World War II, he and his wife decided to stay in exile, first in Brazil and as from 1953, in the US, where they later applied for citizenship.

In 1956 Pawłowicz was appointed Lublin Lecturer in Polish history and literature at Canisius College in Buffalo and as from 1957 wrote a weekly column in the Chicago published magazine Ameryka Echo. Also in 1957, he received an honorary doctorate in literature and culture from Le Moyne College in Syracuse.

In 1961, he moved with his wife to Silver Springs, Maryland, where they worked for research offices in Washington, D.C. and where they lived until his death on May 28, 1967, in the car on his way home from a conference in New York. He was buried in the All Souls cemetery in Pleasantville, New York.

While in exile, Pawłowicz was the delegate in Brazil for the Board of the Polish Combatants Association (SPK) from 1946 to 1953, a board member of the Navy Mutual Aid Branch in New York (1953–1956), the vice-president of the SPK circle in Buffalo and honorary member of the Merchant Navy Officers Association.

== Honours and awards ==
He was awarded the Medal for Freedom and Independence (Medal Niepodległości) for active participation in the struggle for Polish independence, the Cross of Valour (Krzyż Walecznych) for his attitude during the naval battle on May 27, 1942, and the British War Medal 1939-1945. In Brazil, he was awarded the Ordem Barão do Rio Branco.

== Works ==
Pawłowicz was a prolific writer with a varied literary output. Among his writings, which mirror the different periods of his life, one can find poems, travel writings and journals, novels (covering South American themes, esp. Brazil), short stories targeted at young people, memoirs describing his war experience, radio broadcasts, public speeches and newspaper articles. He was considerably popular in Poland in the interwar period, as a radio broadcaster on seafaring and exotic themes.

Much of his work was published in Poland, much in exile (mostly UK and US) but quite a number of writings still remain in manuscript, especially his diaries, Silva Rerum or Pele Mele, as he titled them, and in which, for many years, he recorded his impressions, daily life and anecdotes.

=== Poems ===
- Szary Czlowiek.[The Gray Man]
- Morze. [The Sea]
- Na Bałtyku [On the Baltic]
- Cisza na morzu [Silence on the sea]

=== Teen fiction ===
- Franek Na Szerokim Świecie: Przygody Na Morzu I Lądzie. [Franek in the wide world: adventures on sea and land]
- Kolorowe serce : powieść. [Coloured Heart: a novel]

=== Novels ===
- Pionierzy. [Pioneers] - the 2nd edition came out in two volumes and was renamed: v. 1. Wojciech Mierzwa w Paranie; [Wojciech Mierzwa in Parana]. 2. Wyspa Świętej Katarzyny.[The island of Saint Catherine]
- Załoga; ostatnia podróż parowca "Barbara". [Crew: the last journey of steamer Barbara]
- Chłopiec Z Pinjorowych Lasów. [The boy from the pine forests]

=== Short stories ===
- Córka latarnika : opowieści egzotyczne.[The lighthouse keeper's daughter: exotic stories]

=== Memoirs ===
- Pod Polską Banderą. [Under Polish flag]
- W Słońcu Dalekiego Południa: Szkice Z Podróży.[In the sun of the far south: travel sketches]
- Przez ocean do Polski walczącej. [Across the ocean to fighting Poland]
- O.R.P. Garland in Convoy to Russia: The record of a Polish destroyer on her journey from Great Britain to Murmansk and Archangel in the spring of 1942.
- Krew Na Oceanie: Kartki Z Pamiętnika W Konwoju Do Rosji. [Blood on the ocean: cards and diaries from the convoy to Russia]

=== Reported missing ===
- Storm w la Manche. (1939) 351-page typewritten script.

=== Unpublished manuscripts ===
- Piraci XX wieku [Pirates of the 20th century]
- Korsarz z Wyspy Zólwia [The corsair from the Turtle Island]
- Ochotnik z Brazylii [A volunteer from Brazil]
- Romans w Rio de Janeiro (Romance in Rio de Janeiro]
- The Girl from Brazil
- Kurki Wodne znad Guaiba [Moorhens from Guaiba]

== Documentary Narration ==
- Podnosimy kotwice (1941) [Poles Weigh Anchor]
