= Lapgiriai Manor =

Coordinates: 55°15′15″N 22°51′58″E

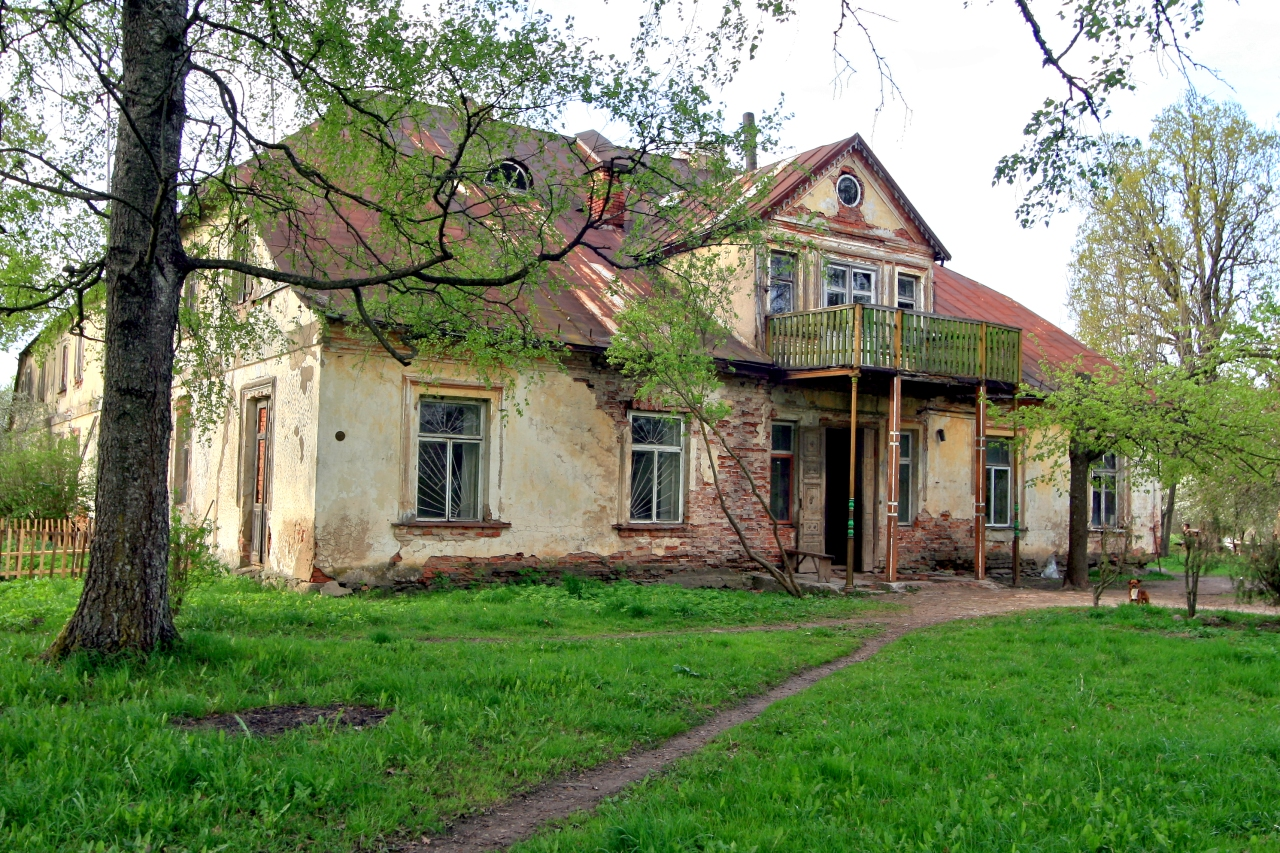
Lapgiriai Manor in 2010

Lapgiriai Manor was a former residential manor in Lapgiriai village, Jurbarkas District Municipality, Lithuania. It was established in the mid-19th century.
