= Liudas Jakavicius-Grimalauskas =

Lithuanian pianist, composer and theatre director

Liudas Jakavičius-Grimalauskas (10 August 1910, Riga, Latvia – 3 July 1998, Buenos Aires, Argentina) was a Lithuanian pianist, composer and theatre director. He was son of the writer and banker and Liudvikas Jakavičius and of Honorata Grimalauskaitė-Jakavičienė, daughter of a Polish-Lithuanian Duke.

== Early life ==
Liudas Jakavičius-Grimalauskas was the son of Lithuanians, but he was born in Riga, Latvia where his father had all his business. The Jakavičius-Grimalauskas family was one of the most prominent families in Latvia. Liudas Jakavičius-Grimalauskas began studying drama and music with private tutors at the age four and graduated as pianist from the Lithuanian Academy of Music and Theatre (Kaunas Conservatoire). He was a disciple of the noted composer, pianist and educator Dmitry Kabalevsky.

== Career to 1940 ==
From 1926 to 1940 he worked as theatre director in the Šiauliai Drama Theatre and as a pianist in radio (Kaunas Radio and Šiauliai Radio) and with different orchestras and bands, giving concerts throughout Northern Europe (Germany, Poland, Lithuania, Latvia, Estonia, Finland, Sweden and Norway), earning recognition as a musician in his home country and abroad. During this period (1926–1940) he was pianist of the Kaunas Laisvės Philharmonic, Lithuanian National Opera and Ballet Orchestra, Hofmekleris Orchestra, Concert Capella (band), and Pomerancas Orchestra (band). In 1933 he composed the first Lithuanian tango, called "Sutemos tango".

== Wartime ==
With the invasion of Lithuania by Nazi Germany in 1941, he was designated president of the Šiauliai Drama Theatre until the government sent a new permanent president. After his presidency of the Šiauliai Drama Theatre, he worked for the German Army as translator because of his fluency in eight languages (Lithuanian, Latvian, German, Polish, Czech, Italian, Spanish and Russian).

== Postwar career ==
After the end of World War II in Lithuania, which was annexed by the Soviet Union, he moved to Italy in 1944, where he married Gražina Janavičienė-Jakavičienė, aunt of the Lithuanian businessman Zenonas Janavičius. In 1948 he moved with his wife to Argentina, where he worked as a pianist in various radio stations such as Radio Splendid, Radio El Mundo and Radio Rivadavia. Also he worked as a pianist in the famous Alvear Palace Hotel.

== Later life ==
Due to poor health, he formally retired from music in 1967. He died on 3 July 1998 in Buenos Aires, Argentina. He is survived by his daughters and his grandson. His daughters are the actress, singer and composer Marcia Bell and the model, fashion designer, businesswoman and writer Carla Rigg. His grandson is the lawyer and culture promoter Liudvikas Jakavicius-Grimalauskas, son of Carla Rigg who decided to conceive him as single mother.
