= Algimantas Puipa =

Lithuanian film director and screenwriter (born 1951)

- Born: 14 June 1951 (age 74); Antalieptė, Lithuanian SSR, USSR (now Lithuania)
- Occupations: Film director, screenwriter
- Years active: 1975–present

Algimantas Puipa (born 14 June 1951) is a Lithuanian film director and screenwriter. With more than 70,000 admissions, his film Whisper of Sin was a success in Lithuania. Other successful films include Forest of the Gods and Elze's Life.

== Biography ==
Puipa graduated from All–Union State Institute of Cinematography located in Moscow in 1974. He directed his first feature film alongside Stasys Motiejūnas the following year. His first successful film was Devil's Seed. It won the Soviet Film Festival Prize for its realistic portrayal of rural life in the early twentieth century. Puipa specializes in drama films.

== Selected filmography ==
Film
Year	Title	Translation	Awards
1975	Atpildo diena	The Day of Retribution	
1978	Nebūsiu gangsteris, brangioji	I Won't Be a Gangster, My Dear	
1979	Velnio sėkla	Devil's Seed	(Soviet Union) Soviet Film Festival Prize in Dushanbe (1980)
1981	Arkliavagio duktė	A Horse–Thief's Daughter	
1983	Moteris ir keturi jos vyrai	A Woman and Her Four Men	(Soviet Union) Best Cinematographer Film in Chișinău (1983) (Soviet Union) Soviet Film Festival Prize in Kyiv (1984)
1985	Elektroninė senelė	Electronic Grandmother	
1987	Amžinoji šviesa	Eternal Light	(Italy) San Remo Film Festival Grand Prize in Sanremo (1990)
1989	Žuvies diena	Fish Day	
1990	Bilietas iki Tadž Mahalo	Ticket to Taj Mahal	(Germany) Munich's International Film Festival Ecumenical Jury Prize (1991)
1991	Ir ten krantai smėlėti	Over There the Shores are Sandy	(Europe) Shown in multiple film festivals, including Munich, Rotterdam, Paris and Sanremo
1994	Procesas	Process	
1994	Ašarų pakalnė	A Hill of Tears	
1995	Žaibo nušviesti	Hit By Lightning	
1996	Velnio išvarymas iš Mykolų kaimo	Exorcism in Mykolai Village	
1997	Vilko dantų karoliai	A Wolf Teeth Necklace	(Germany) Northern European Film Day Ecumenical Jury Prize in Lübeck (1997) (France) Northern European Film Festival Grand Prize in Roanne (1998)
2000	Elzė iš Gilijos	Elze's Life	(Russia) Kinošok Film Festival Best Director Laureate in Anapa (2000) (Germany) Berlin Film Festival Panorama Film (2000)
2002	Trys mylimos, arba Paskutinė diena	Three Beloved (the Last Day)	
2005	Dievų miškas	Forest of the Gods	(Lithuania) Best Premiere Record (2005–2007)
2007	Nuodėmės užkalbėjimas	Whisper of Sin	(Lithuania) Silver Crane Laureate for Best Film in Vilnius (2008) (Lithuania) Best Premiere Record (2007–2008)
2011	Miegančių drugelių tvirtovė	The Fortress of Sleeping Butterflies	
2015	Edeno sodas	Garden Eden	
