= Forest of the Gods =

Lithuanian memoir novel

Forest of the Gods (Lithuanian: Dievų miškas) is a memoir of the Lithuanian poet and writer Balys Sruoga about his experiences in the Nazi Stutthof concentration camp. It was one of the first memoirs in Europe about Nazi camps. According to the author, the title is the local name of the marshy wooded area in which the camp was established.

A distinctive feature of the memoir is its gallows humor. An example: Balys and another camp inmate Jonas are carrying a dead inmate, who suddenly started sighing. "Well, well", says Jonas, "Why are you sighing? You died already, then just be dead and don't sigh!"

Balys Sruoga started writing his memoir in 1945 and finished a 450-page manuscript in several months in a writers' sanatorium in Birštonas. For many years the Soviet censorship disallowed the publication of the memoir. It was published only in 1957 in a censored form, after the author's death. The full original novel was published in 2011.

The 2005 film under the same name, Forest of the Gods became the most profitable Lithuanian film released after Lithuania restored its independence.

== Translations ==
- Russian translation: Лес богов, by Григорий Канович and Фёдор Шуравин, 1957
- Polish translation: Las bogów (from Russian) by Stanislaw Majewski, Gdynia : Wydawnictwo Morskie, 1965 (Las bogów in libraries (WorldCat catalog))
- English translation: by Ausrine Byla, by Vaga Publishers, Vilnius, 1996.
- French translation: La Forêt des dieux, by Miglé Dulskyté, Arles : Actes Sud, 2027.
