= Vanda Daugirdaitė-Sruogienė =

Lithuanian historian and cultural activist

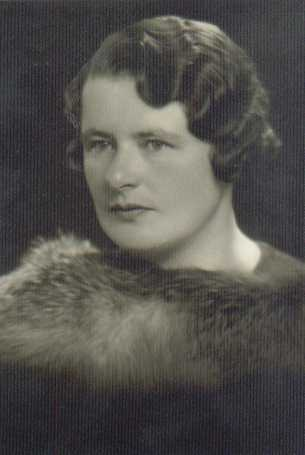
- Born: Vanda Daugirdaitė; 16 August 1899; Pyatigorsk, Russian Empire
- Died: 10 February 1997 (aged 97); Putnam, Connecticut, United States
- Burial place: Rasos Cemetery
- Education: Moscow Commercial Institute, Humboldt University of Berlin, University of Bonn
- Occupations: Writer, educator, activist
- Notable work: Lietuvos istorija: Lietuva amžių sūkury (1956)
- Spouse: Balys Sruoga
- Children: Dalia Sruogaitė
- Awards: Order of the Lithuanian Grand Duke Gediminas (1939)

Vanda Sruogienė née Daugirdaitė (16 August 1899 – 10 February 1997) was a Lithuanian historian, educator, and cultural activist. She was the wife of writer Balys Sruoga.

== Biography ==
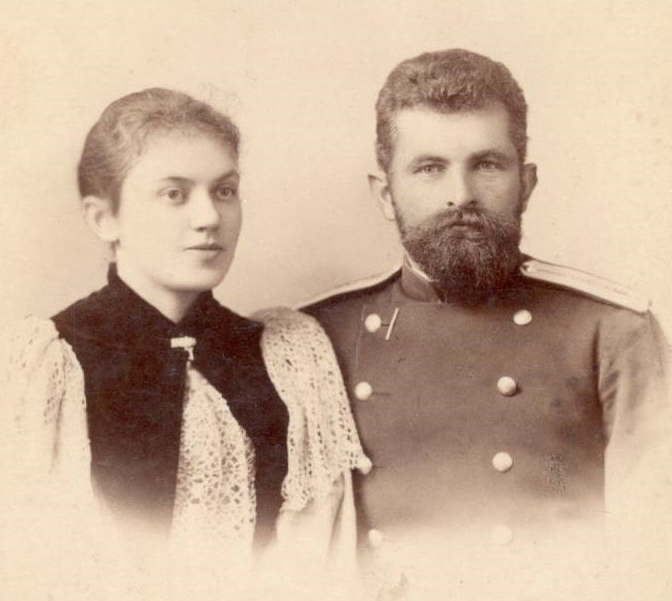
Daugirdaitės's parents Kazimieras Daugirdas and Jadvyga Paulavičiūtė in 1896, Minsk

=== Early life and education ===
Vanda Daugirdaitė was born on 16 August 1899 in Pyatigorsk. Her father Kazimieras Daugirdas was a veterinarian of Kharkov University. A descendant of the Lithuanian noble Daugirdai family, Kazimieras Daugirdas owned a manor in Būgiai. He was exiled from the Šiauliai Gymnasium for illegally reading Aušra, and as a punishment was stationed in the northern Caucasus for military service, where his daughter was born. On her mother's side, she was the granddaughter of Edward Pawłowicz, a well-known educational activist.

Daugirdaitė was taught Polish literature, history, and the Polish language by her mother née Jadwiga Pawłowicz. In her childhood, Daugirdaitė learned French and Ukrainian. Daugirdaitė graduated from gymnasiums in Rostov-on-Don and Kamianets-Podilskyi in 1916. She then enrolled at the Moscow Commercial Institute the following year to study for a few semesters. There she met the upcoming writer Balys Sruoga.

After graduating in 1918, Daugirdaitė traveled to Lithuania and taught French at the Šiauliai Gymnasium. In 1919 Daugirdaitė traveled to Kaunas, where she worked on the editorial board of the daily newspaper Lietuva. During Lithuanian negotiations with Poland during the Polish–Lithuanian War, Daugirdaitė interviewed members of the Military Control Commission of the League of Nations and prepared Polish and French press reviews. Working with the Lithuanian press bureau, her relationship with Balys Sruoga deepened. From 1921 to 1923, Daugirdaitė studied philosophy at the Humboldt University of Berlin. She married Balys Sruoga on 22 March 1924 in the village of Būgiai. Their only child, Dalia Sruogaitė, was born on 15 August 1925.

=== Historian career in Lithuania ===
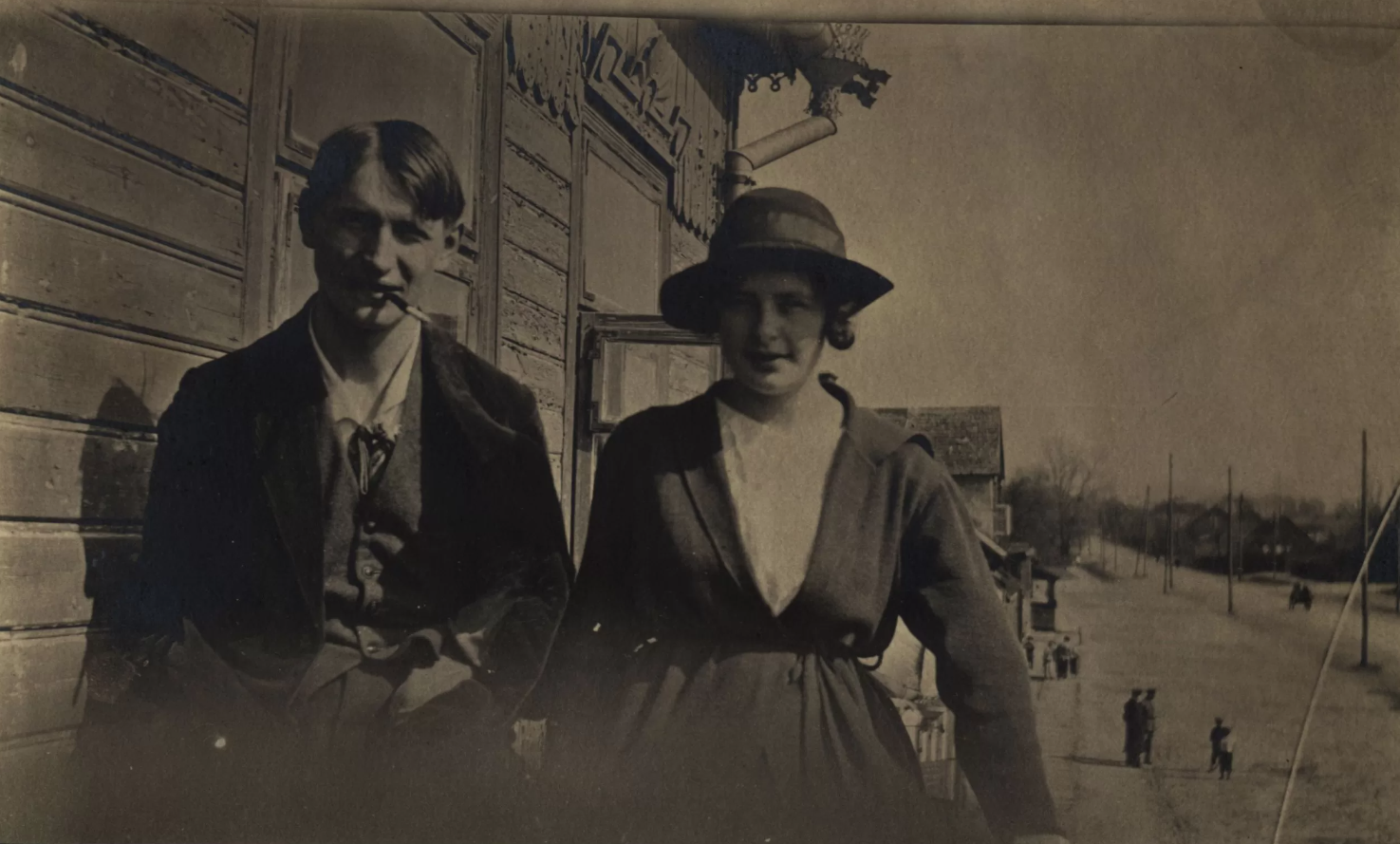
Balys Sruoga and Vanda Daugirdaitė in 1922

Sruogienė graduated from the University of Lithuania in 1929 with a degree in history, becoming a member of the Lithuanian Historical Society shortly thereafter. She lectured on history from 1927, and was the chief editor of the newspaper Vyturys from 1929. Sruogienė contributed to various journals such as Lietuvos žinios, Naujoji Romuva, Lietuvos aidas, and others. She was the author of multiple books on Lithuanian history, such as Lietuvos istorijos vadovėlis gimnazijoms (1935), a school history textbook, as well as Žemaičių bajorų ūkis I pusėj XIX šimtmečio (1938) and Lietuvos istorijos vaizdai ir raštai (1939). As a historian, Sruogienė helped her husband create historically accurate poems. In 1939 she was awarded the Order of the Lithuanian Grand Duke Gediminas.

=== Emigration ===
After the Soviet occupation of Lithuania in 1940, Sruogienė and her husband moved to Vilnius. Until 1944, she was the principal of two gymnasiums. In 1944 she moved to Germany in hopes of freeing her husband from the Stutthof concentration camp, however, he had already returned to Lithuania. After briefly exchanging letters, the couple never met each other again. Sruogienė studied philosophy at the University of Bonn from 1944 to 1948.

She and her only daughter emigrated to the United States in 1949. As an émigré teacher living in Chicago, Sruogienė contributed to the making of the Lithuanian Encyclopedia published in Boston. Additionally, she wrote Lietuvos istorija: Lietuva amžių sūkury (1956), a book on the history of Lithuania spanning first human appearances in the Baltic region to the Second World War, Lietuvos kultūros istorijos bruožai (1962), and Lietuvos Stegiamasis Seimas (1975). Sruogienė lectured at Aurora University from 1958 to 1969. She also actively took care of her husband's literary heritage; in 1974 she co-authored, along with their daughter Dalia Sruogaitė, a book on Balys Sruoga entitled Balys Sruoga mūsų atsiminimuose. Sruogienė was a member of the Lithuanian Research Center based in Chicago, the International Women's Forum, and other Lithuanian organizations.

Sruogienė died on 10 February 1997 in Putnam, Connecticut. She was re-buried in 1998 at the Rasos Cemetery.

== Remembrance ==
Her book concerning Lithuanian history was re-published in Lithuania in 1990. Since 1997, the Lithuanian Foundation of the US and the Institute of Lithuanian Emigrants annually award the Vanda Daugirdaitė-Sruogienė scholarship to talented, well-educated students of Vytautas Magnus University who actively participate in scientific and social activities. Her and her husband's former home in central Vilnius was opened as a museum in 1986.

== Bibliography ==
- Samulionis, Algis (1986). Balys Sruoga (in Lithuanian). Vilnius: Vaga Publishers.
