= Balys Sruoga =

Lithuanian dramatist and playwright (1896–1947)

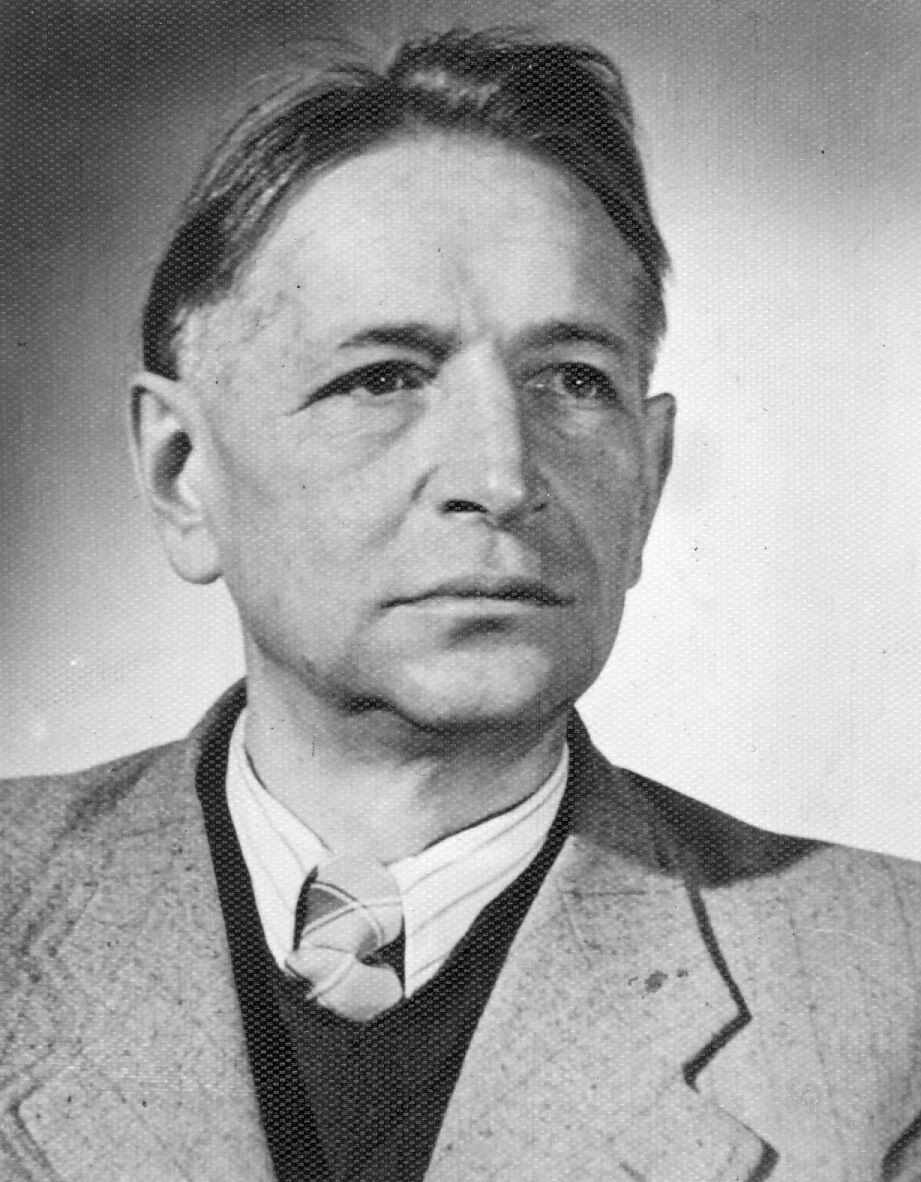
- Sruoga in 1945
- Born: Balys Sruoga; 2 February 1896; Baibokai, Kovno Governorate, Russian Empire
- Died: 16 October 1947 (aged 51); Vilnius, Lithuanian SSR, Soviet Union
- Resting place: Rasos Cemetery
- Education: Ludwig-Maximilians-Universität München
- Occupations: Playwright, novelist, literary and theater critic
- Spouse: Vanda Daugirdaitė-Sruogienė (m. 1924)
- Children: Dalia Sruogaitė
- Relatives: Juozas Sruoga, Adolfas Sruoga, Kazys Sruoga
- Writing career
- Genre: Symbolism
- Notable work: Dievų miškas (Forest of the Gods)

Balys Sruoga (2 February 1896 – 16 October 1947) was a Lithuanian poet, playwright, critic, and literary theorist.

He contributed to cultural journals from his early youth. His works were published by the liberal wing of the Lithuanian cultural movement, and also in various Lithuanian newspapers and other outlets (such as Aušrinė, Rygos naujienos etc.). In 1914, he began studying literature in Saint Petersburg, and later in Moscow, due to World War I and the Russian Revolution. In 1921, he enrolled in the Ludwig-Maximilians-Universität München, where in 1924 he received his Ph.D. for a doctoral thesis on the relations between Lithuanian and Slavic folk songs. Sruoga was also the first translator of Anna Akhmatova's poetry, which he likely completed between November 1916 and early 1917.

After returning to Lithuania, Sruoga taught at the University of Lithuania and established a theater seminar that eventually became a course of study. He also wrote various articles on literature. From 1930, he began writing dramas. In 1939, he began teaching at Vilnius University. Shortly after the annexation of Lithuania by the Soviet Union, Sruoga relocated to Vilnius, where he continued lecturing on theater. However, during the Nazi occupation of the country, as an intellectual, Sruoga was arrested, imprisoned, and later deported to the Stutthof concentration camp. He wrote of his experience in the camp in the novel Forest of the Gods. After the camp was liberated by Soviet troops, the frail author died two years later in 1947.

== Early life ==
=== Studies in Lithuania ===
Balys Sruoga was born on 2 February 1896 in the village of Baibokai (near modern-day Panevėžys), then the Kovno Governorate of the Russian Empire. Balys's parents, Pranciškus Sruoga and Agota Sruogienė (née Lomanaitė) also raised Juozas Sruoga (1886–1957), a diplomat; Adolfas Sruoga (1887–1941), director of postal services; and Kazys Sruoga (1899–1974), an economist. Their parents had a large amount of land, but were nevertheless peasants. Future Prime Minister of Lithuania Ernestas Galvanauskas was a distant relative of the Sruoga family. As was standard at the time, before beginning official education, Sruoga attended a private secret school that was set up at his home. He attended a school of the Vabalninkas parish in 1903. From 1906 to 1914, Sruoga attended the Panevėžys real school, where he belonged to the socialist Aušrininkai society and became its leader in the city. Sruoga was an active participant and organizer of the city's music and drama society Aidas. Although reserved in nature, Sruoga became known for his literary school work; he later printed poems, articles, and correspondences in newspapers such as Aušrinė, Rygos naujienos, and the Vaivorykštė magazine.

=== Studies in Russia ===
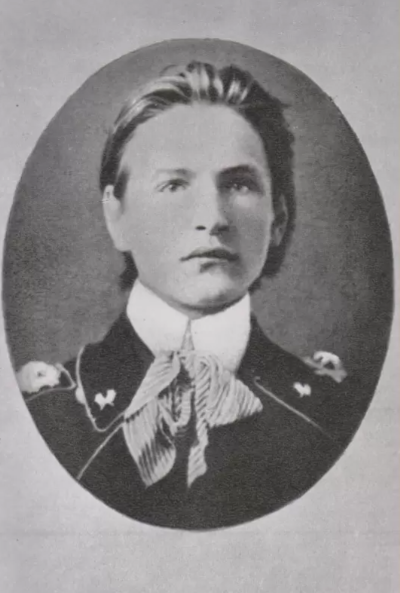
Balys Sruoga in 1915

Although he initially wanted to study philology in Moscow, instead in 1914 Sruoga traveled to St. Petersburg, where he first studied at the Imperial Forestry Institute, but later changed to studying literature in 1915. In the city, Sruoga experienced a psychological crisis mainly due to loneliness and homesickness. Sruoga was one of the editors of the Lithuanian literary almanac in the Russian language. To assist Sruoga in his living standards, Sruoga was invited to work at the Lithuanian Society for the Relief of War Sufferers by Stasys Šilingas and Adomas Varnas, where he had prepared a technical terms glossary that has not survived. In St. Petersburg, Sruoga was also acquainted with Ignas Šeinius, Jurgis Baltrušaitis, Konstantin Balmont, Vyacheslav Ivanov, and Maxim Gorky. Sruoga continued translating the works of Mykolas Vaitkus, Maironis, Sofija Čiurlionienė, Ignas Šeinius, and others.

In 1916, Sruoga moved to Moscow, where he began attending the Imperial Moscow University at the faculty of history and philology. In Moscow, Sruoga was attracted by the symbolist movement as well as the works and ideas of Friedrich Nietzsche. Due to the outbreak of the October Revolution, Sruoga's language almanac was not published. Sruoga visited the Caucasus in 1917. A year later, due to the increasing chaos and famine, Sruoga and other war refugees returned to Lithuania in 1918.

== Life in Lithuania ==
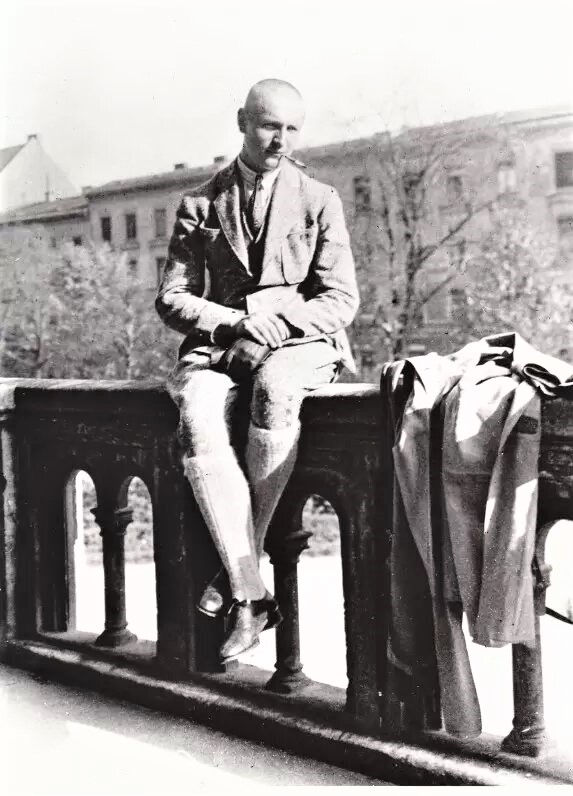
Balys Sruoga as a student in Munich, 1923

After returning to Lithuania, Sruoga lived in Vilnius. However, as military tensions between newly independent Lithuania and Poland were rising (which would culminate in the Polish–Lithuanian War), Sruoga decided to leave Vilnius and traveled to Kaunas on foot in 1919, where Sruoga worked as the chief editor of the newspaper Lietuva. That same year he was elected as the first president of the Vilkolakis Theatre. There he met his future wife Vanda Daugirdaitė-Sruogienė. Sruoga was also one of the initiators in establishing the Society of Lithuanian Art Creators, abbreviated then as "Liemenkūdra". As the secretary of the society, Sruoga wrote letters to Lithuanian authorities and Lithuanians in the United States regarding the establishment of opera and drama theaters, the publication of chrestomathy of world literature, and the awarding of prizes and scholarships to prominent artists. Sruoga at that point established himself as a literary and theater critic.

In 1921, Sruoga traveled to Ludwig-Maximilians-Universität München, where he studied Slavic philology. Sruoga was also interested in German Impressionist and Expressionist literature. Sruoga planned on becoming a mountaineer at the nearby mountains. Nonetheless, Sruoga continued to be a critic for the press as a means to earn money. In 1924, Sruoga received a Ph.D. for his doctoral thesis on the relations between Lithuanian and Slavic folk songs.

He returned to Lithuania that same year. On 22 March 1924, Sruoga married Vanda Daugirdaitė in the village of Būgiai, after which they moved to the port city Klaipėda. Their only daughter Dalia Sruogaitė was born in 1927. Originally, Sruoga decided to move there to write a libretto commissioned by Jonas Žilius-Jonila. For a few months, Sruoga worked on the editorial board of the local state-established news magazine. In autumn, Sruoga moved to back to Kaunas. Until 1940, Sruoga worked at the faculty of humanitarian sciences of the Vytautas Magnus University, where he lectured on Russian literature and the history of theater as a docent. During this time, Sruoga created what is considered his most mature works of literature, such as the historical plays Milžino paunksmė (1932), Baisioji naktis, Radvila Perkūnas, the allegorical children's play Aitvaras teisėjas (1935), Giesmė apie Gediminą (1938), among others. During his fifteen years of work at the university, Sruoga published fourteen fiction and science books. He also briefly belonged to the Lithuanian Writers' Union. In 1932 Sruoga became a professor. Sruoga also published two volumes on the history of Russian literature in 1931–1933.

== Life during occupation ==
In 1940, after the Soviet occupation of Lithuania, Sruoga moved to Vilnius. Sruoga proceeded to join the Writers' Trade Union of the Lithuanian SSR. During Nazi occupation, Sruoga continued to head his theater seminar.

=== Forest of the Gods ===
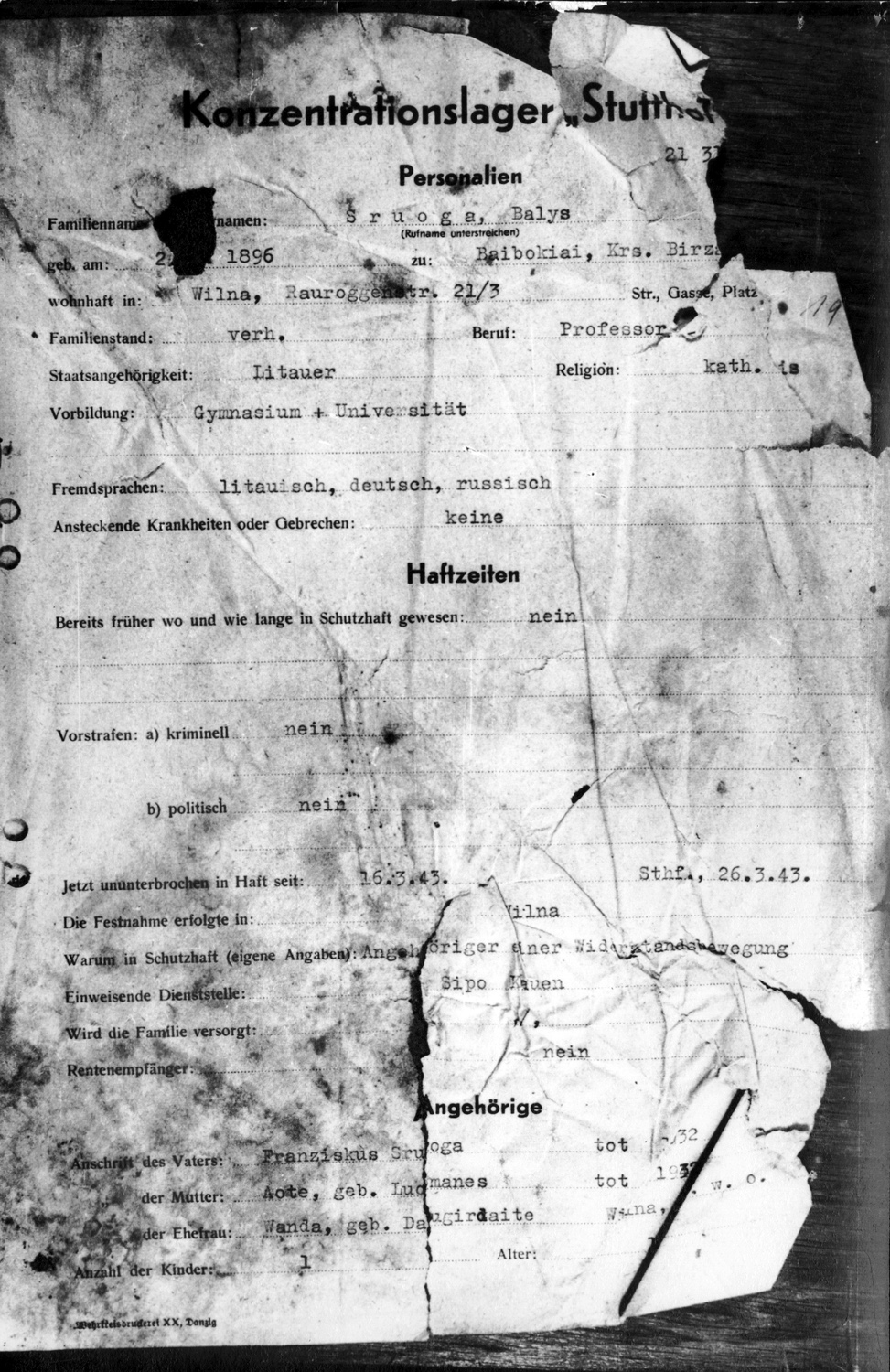
File of Balys Sruoga in Stutthof, 1943

Sruoga's best known work is the novel Forest of the Gods, based on his own life experiences as a prisoner in Stutthof concentration camp in Sztutowo, Free City of Danzig (now present-day Nowy Dwór County, Pomeranian Voivodeship, Poland), where he was sent in March 1943 together with forty-seven other Lithuanian intellectuals after the Nazis started a campaign against possible anti-Nazi agitation in occupied Lithuania. Sruoga staunchly opposed Nazism. In the book, Sruoga revealed life in a concentration camp through the eyes of a man whose only way to save his life and maintain his dignity was to view everything through a veil of irony and humor, where torturers and their victims are exposed as imperfect human beings, being far removed from the false ideals of their political leaders. For example, he wrote "A man is not a machine. He gets tired.", referring to the guards beating prisoners. Originally, the novel was suppressed by the Soviet officials; it was ultimately published in 1957, ten years after the author's death. The novel was adapted into a movie in 2005 under the name Forest of the Gods, becoming the most profitable film released after Lithuania restored its independence.

Sruogas's experiences in the concentration camp were written with elements of the grotesque, where dark humor creates an image of an absurd world. The novel is generally compared to Western existentialist literature due to motifs of dehumanization and the fall of civilization – the camp is presented at the beginning of the book as a resort, and German culture is presented as passing from "baroque" to "barrack".

== Later life ==
After the Soviet Union liberated the Nazi camps, Sruoga continued to be held in the same camp. Before returning to Vilnius, Sruoga spent another two months in a military field hospital in Lauenburg and in Toruń, in a temporary camp where ex-prisoners were checked to ensure that there were no war criminals or agents subordinate to Nazi Germany in hiding. In the camp, Sruoga worked at the post office and the chief's office, where he translated and processed documents. In 1945, Sruoga returned to Vilnius and lectured on pedagogy at Vilnius University, where he wrote the dramas Pajūrio kurortas and Barbora Radvilaitė.

The Soviet authorities' refusal to publish Sruogas's novel, weak health resulting from his time in the concentration camp, as well as the psychological burden of not seeing his daughter and wife who fled the war and emigrated to United States, led to his death on 16 October 1947. He succumbed during his return journey from Kaunas to Vilnius due to complications arising from a cold. He was buried in the Rasos Cemetery.

== Remembrance ==
A memorial plate was uncovered in Vilnius in 1992. He is the namesake of a street in Antakalnis.

== Bibliography ==
- Andrijauskaitė, Ugnė Marija (2013). Aušrininkų organizacija 1910-1938 m. (PDF) (Master's thesis) (in Lithuanian). Kaunas: Vytautas Magnus University.
- Samulionis, Algis (1986). Balys Sruoga (in Lithuanian). Vilnius: Vaga Publishers.
