= Kazys Sruoga =

Lithuanian economist (1899–1974)

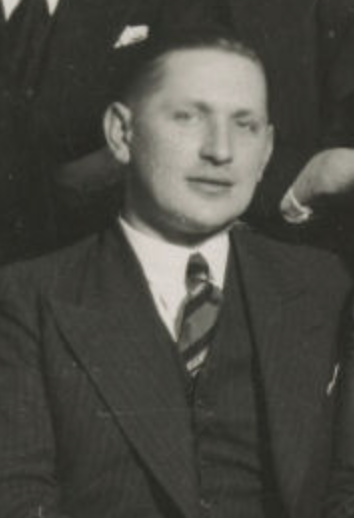
- Kazys Sruoga in 1933
- Born: 2 April 1899; Baibokai, Kovno Governorate, Russian Empire
- Died: 9 March 1974 (aged 84); Elgin, Illinois, United States
- Relatives: Adolfas Sruoga, Balys Sruoga, Juozas Sruoga

Academic background
- Education: University of Bern

Academic work
- Discipline: Economy
- Notable ideas: Production cost calculation in Lithuania

Kazys Sruoga (2 April 1899 – 9 March 1974) was a Lithuanian economist and advisor to the Lithuanian Ministry of Economy. Sruoga is remembered as the pioneer of the calculation of production cost in interwar Lithuania. He was the brother of writer Balys Sruoga.

== Biography ==
Sruoga was born on 2 April 1899 in the village of Baibokai, near modern-day Panevėžys, then the Kovno Governorate of the Russian Empire. In 1918 Sruoga graduated from the Panevėžys real school. Due to the First World War, it was moved to Venyov, a town belonging to the Imperial Russian Tula Governorate. After returning to German-occupied Lithuania, Sruoga was secretly made the elder of Vabalninkas, and later as manager of the education department of the Biržai district. Sruoga fought in the Lithuanian Wars of Independence, serving in the Lithuanian Army from 28 October 1919 to 5 August 1922. For his service, in 1931 he was awarded his own plot in Kaunas, the temporary capital of Lithuania.

Sruoga graduated from the Swiss St. Gallen Institute of Trade in 1925. Sruoga graduated from the University of Bern in 1929 with a doctor's degree. From 1929 to 1936, Sruoga was head of the department of loans and economic information of the Lithuanian Ministry of Finance. An active entrepreneur, Sruoga read lectures on economic questions on the Kaunas radiophone, wrote articles in various magazines such as Tautos ūkis, Vairas, Lietuvos Aidas, and others. From 1933 to 1936, Sruoga edited the weekly newspaper Verslas. From 1935 to 1937, Sruoga wrote a total of four books. From 1936 to 1940, Sruoga acted as the co-director of the joint-stock company Maistas.

In 1944, Sruoga emigrated to Germany, and to the United States in 1947. As an émigré, Sruoga was a council member of the Lithuanian Community of the United States of America, the Lithuanian Armed Forces Volunteer Center, as well as the chairman of the Chicago branch of the Union of Lithuanian Journalists. From 1953 to 1954, Sruoga was one of the editors of the Laisva Lietuva magazine.

Sruoga died on 9 March 1974 in Elgin, Illinois.
