= Robertas Nevecka =

Lithuanian film director

- Born: 1 April 1984; Klaipėda, Lithuanian SSR, Soviet Union
- Occupations: Film director, animator, illustrator
- Notable work: Snow Shelter; Film Crew in Quarantine; Bomba
- Website: Official Website

Robertas Nevecka (born 1 April 1984) is a Lithuanian film director, animator, and illustrator.

== Biography ==
Robertas Nevecka was born on 1 April 1984 in Klaipėda, Lithuania.

He graduated from the Lithuanian Academy of Music and Theatre with a master's degree in cinematography and directing in 2007.

Robertas Nevecka has directed films, animations, and music videos, illustrated album covers for underground bands, and regularly shares his illustrations on social media. He also works as an assistant director on various fiction projects, including all films by director Vytautas Katkus and films produced by Marija Razgutė (M-Films), such as Cherries (directed by Vytautas Katkus), and Slow directed by Marija Kavtaradzė.

Between 2022 and 2023 he shared about twenty caricature illustrations in support of Ukraine on his social media platforms.

== Filmography ==
=== Director ===
- 2020: Snow Shelter / Sniego pastogė (animation / short film).
- 2020: Film Crew in Quarantine / Kino žmonės karantine (animation / short film).
- 2014: The Jungle / Džiunglės (fiction / short film).
- 2013: The Bomb / Bomba (fiction / short film).
- 2013: The Bandit / Banditas (fiction / short film).
- 2012: Curonian Twitch / Kuršių trūkčiojimai (fiction / short film).
- 2011: Street Artist / Gatvės artistas (fiction / short film).
- 2011: A Film About Filming Horses / Filmas apie filmą apie arklius (documentary / short film).
- 2007: Kuleshovas / Kulešovas (experimental / short film).

=== Assistant director ===
- 2023: Slow, feature film directed by Marija Kavtaradzė, Cinematographer Laurynas Bareiša, produced by Marija Razgutė (M-Films).
- 2023: Nominee, short film directed by Birutė Kapustinskaitė, Cinematographer Vytautas Katkus.
- 2023: 1991, short film directed by Linas Žiūra, Cinematographer Ugnius Tuleikis.
- 2022: Parada, feature film directed by Titas Laucius, Cinematographer Laurynas Bareiša.
- 2022: The Poet, feature film directed by Giedrius Tamoševičius and Vytautas V. Landsbergis, Cinematographer Vytautas Plukas.
- 2022: Cherries, short film directed by Vytautas Katkus, Cinematographer Simonas Glinskis, produced by Marija Razgutė (M-Films).
- 2022: The Trip, short film directed by Jorūnė Greičiūtė, Cinematographer Zbigniev Bartoševič.
- 2021: Song for a fox, feature film directed by Kristijonas Vildžiūnas, Cinematographer Jurģis Kmins.
- 2021: Pilgrims feature film directed by Laurynas Bareiša, Cinematographer Narvydas Naujalis.
- 2021: Parking lot, short film directed by Jorė Janavičiūtė, Cinematographer Vytautas Katkus.
- 2021: Techno Mama, short film directed by Saulius Baradinskas, Cinematographer Vytautas Katkus.
- 2020: PLACES, short film directed by Vytautas Katkus.
- 2020: Dummy, short film directed by Laurynas Bareiša.
- 2019: Community Garden, short film directed by Vytautas Katkus.
- 2018: Family Unit, short film directed by Titas Laucius, Cinematographer Zbigniev Bartoševič.
- 2016: The roots are bitter, short film directed by Domas Petronis, Cinematographer Zbigniev Bartoševič.
- 2015: I'm Twenty Something, short film directed by Marija Kavtaradzė, Cinematographer Laurynas Bareiša, produced by Marija Razgutė (M-Films)

== Awards and nominations ==
Festival and Year	Category	Name of the Movie	Result (Win or Nominated)
Vilnius International Film Festival 2013	Best Debut Film Award	Bomba	Win
Tallinn Black Nights Film Festival 2013	International Student Film Award	Bomba	Nominated
Lithuanian National Cinema Awards 2015	Best Student Film category	Bomba	Nominated
Salerno International Film Festival 2020	Grand Prize for Best Animation Film	Snow Shelter	Win
Tirana International Film Festival 2020	Jury Prize for Best Animated Short Film	Snow Shelter	Win
Mister Vorky Film Festival 2020	Short Film Award	Film Crew in Quarantine	Win
Vilnius International Film Festival 2020	Best Short Film Award	Snow Shelter	Nominated
Brukivka International Film Festival 2021	Jury Prize for Best Animated Short Film	Snow Shelter	Nominated
Lithuanian National Cinema Awards 2021	Best Animation Film category	Snow Shelter	Nominated
British Animation Film Festival 2021	Official Selection	Snow Shelter	Win
