= List of Lithuanian submissions for the Academy Award for Best International Feature Film =

Best International Feature Film submissions from Lithuania

Highlights
- Debut: 2006
- Submissions: 19
- Nominations: none
- Oscar winners: none

Lithuania has submitted films for the Academy Award for Best International Feature Film (Note: The category was previously named the Academy Award for Best Foreign Language Film, but this was changed to the Academy Award for Best International Feature Film in April 2019, after the Academy deemed the word "Foreign" to be outdated.) since 2006 . The award is handed out annually by the United States Academy of Motion Picture Arts and Sciences to a feature-length motion picture produced outside the United States that contains primarily non-English dialogue. It was not created until the 1956 Academy Awards, in which a competitive Academy Award of Merit, known as the Best Foreign Language Film Award, was created for non-English speaking films, and has been given annually since.

As of 2026, Lithuania has submitted nineteen films for the category, but none of them were nominated.

== Submissions ==
Though they have been invited to submit a film by AMPAS regularly since achieving independence in the early 1990s, Lithuania has started to submit films for consideration in 2006. The documentary short Before Flying Back to Earth (2006) was the country first submission. With a 52-minute running time, it is one of the few documentaries and few non-feature-length films ever to be submitted in the category, but it was not nominated.

Below is a list of the films that have been submitted by Lithuania for review by the Academy for the award by year and the respective Academy Awards ceremony.

| Year (Ceremony) | Film title used in nomination | Original title | Director | Result |
|---|---|---|---|---|
| 2006 (79th) | Before Flying Back to Earth | Prieš parskrendant į žemę | Arūnas Matelis | Not nominated |
| 2008 (81st) | Loss | Nereikalingi žmonės | Māris Martinsons | Not nominated |
| 2009 (82nd) | Vortex | Duburys | Gytis Lukšas | Not nominated |
| 2011 (84th) | Back to Your Arms | Kai apkabinsiu tave | Kristijonas Vildžiūnas | Not nominated |
| 2012 (85th) | Ramin | | Audrius Stonys | Not nominated |
| 2013 (86th) | Conversations on Serious Topics | Pokalbiai rimtomis temomis | Giedrė Beinoriūtė | Not nominated |
| 2014 (87th) | The Gambler | Lošėjas | Ignas Jonynas | Not nominated |
| 2015 (88th) | The Summer of Sangailė | Sangailės vasara | Alantė Kavaitė | Not nominated |
| 2016 (89th) | Seneca's Day | Senekos diena | Kristijonas Vildziunas | Not nominated |
| 2017 (90th) | Frost | Šerkšnas | Šarūnas Bartas | Not nominated |
| 2018 (90th) | Wonderful Losers: A Different World | Nuostabieji Luzeriai. Kita planeta | Arūnas Matelis | Not nominated |
| 2019 (92nd) | Bridges of Time | Laiko tiltai | Kristine Briede, Audrius Stonys | Not nominated |
| 2020 (93rd) | Nova Lituania | | Karolis Kaupinis | Not nominated |
| 2021 (94th) | Isaac | Izaokas | Jurgis Matulevičius | Not nominated |
| 2022 (95th) | Pilgrims | Piligrimai | Laurynas Bareiša | Not nominated |
| 2023 (96th) | Slow | Tu man nieko neprimeni | Marija Kavtaradzė | Not nominated |
| 2024 (97th) | Drowning Dry | Sesės | Laurynas Bareiša | Not nominated |
| 2025 (98th) | The Southern Chronicles | Pietinia Kronikas | Ignas Miškinis | Not nominated |
| 2026 (99th) | How to Divorce During the War | Skyrybos karo metu | Andrius Blaževičius | Pending |

== See also ==
- List of countries by number of Academy Awards for Best International Feature Film
- Cinema of Lithuania
