= Runner (2021 film) =

2021 Lithuanian drama film

- Lithuanian: Bėgikė
- Directed by: Andrius Blaževičius
- Screenplay by: Marija Kavtaradzė: Teklė Kavtaradzė; Andrius Blaževičius
- Produced by: Marija Razgutė: Jakub Kostal; Vratislav Slajer; Brigita Beniušytė
- Starring: Žygimantė Elena Jakštaitė: Marius Repšys; Laima Akstinaitė
- Cinematography: Narvydas Naujalis
- Edited by: Ieva Veiverytė
- Music by: Jakub Rataj
- Production company: M-Films: Bionaut
- Distributed by: Alief
- Release dates: 21 August 2021 (Czech Republic); November 2021 (Lithuania)
- Running time: 87 minutes
- Country: Lithuania
- Language: Lithuanian

Runner (Lithuanian: Bėgikė) is a Lithuanian film written and directed by Andrius Blaževičius, released in 2021.

This dramatic thriller explores the themes of self-sacrifice, love, and toxic relationships, realistically portraying 24 hours of a toxic relationship, which eventually contaminates the entire city of Vilnius, Lithuania, all within a chaotic and frenzied chase.

== Plot ==
After her boyfriend Vytas (played by Marius Repšys) experiences a psychotic episode and disappears, Maria (portrayed by Žygimantė Elena Jakštaitė) is determined to find and help him. Chasing every clue about his whereabouts, she embarks on a fast-paced odyssey through the city. Always one step behind and against all odds, she fights for both, her love and her freedom.

== Cast ==
- Žygimantė Elena Jakštaitė as Marija
- Marius Repšys as Vytas
- Laima Akstinaitė as Ona
- Vytautas Kaniušonis as Marija's Father
- Viktorija Kuodytė as Marija's Mother
- Valentinas Krulikovskis as Petras
- Emilis Aškelovičius as Pranas
- Lukas Malinauskas as Jonas
- Indrė Patkauskaitė as Jūratė

== Production ==
Runner is the second feature film by Andrius Blaževičius, marking his second collaboration with producer Marija Razgutė (M-Films) after The Saint in 2016.

Formerly titled Paralysis, Runner was produced by M-Films (Lithuania) in co-production with Bionaut (Czech Republic). The film was financed by the Lithuanian Film Centre during the scriptwriting, development, and production stages, as well as through tax incentives.

Filming took place in Lithuania in the city of Vilnius during the summer of 2019.

== Reception ==
The film was generally well received by critics. It garnered 67% positive reviews based on 390 reviews collected, on the website IMDb and 3.4/5 stars for 350 votes on the website Letterboxd.

== Accolades ==
Award	Date of ceremony	Category	Recipients	Result
Crossing Europe Film Festival 2022	2022	Best Films	Andrius Blaževičius	Selected
National Lithuanian Film Awards 2022 (Silver Crane)	2022	Best Actress	Žygimantė Elena Jakštaitė	Won
National Lithuanian Film Awards 2022 (Silver Crane)	2022	Best Supporting Actress	Laime Akstinaitė	Won
National Lithuanian Film Awards 2022 (Silver Crane)	2022	Best Actor	Marius Repšys	Nominated
National Lithuanian Film Awards 2022 (Silver Crane)	2022	Best Film	Andrius Blaževičius	Nominated
National Lithuanian Film Awards 2022 (Silver Crane)	2022	Best Director	Andrius Blaževičius	Nominated
National Lithuanian Film Awards 2022 (Silver Crane)	2022	Best Screenplay	Marija Kavtaradzė: Teklė Kavtaradzė; Andrius Blaževičius	Nominated
National Lithuanian Film Awards 2022 (Silver Crane)	2022	Best Cinematography	Narvydas Naujalis	Nominated
National Lithuanian Film Awards 2022 (Silver Crane)	2022	Best Editing	Ieva Veiverytė	Nominated
National Lithuanian Film Awards 2022 (Silver Crane)	2022	Best Sound	Martin Ožvold	Nominated
National Lithuanian Film Awards 2022 (Silver Crane)	2022	Best Makeup	Jurgita Globytė	Nominated
National Lithuanian Film Awards 2022 (Silver Crane)	2022	Best Art Direction	Justė Kalnietytė	Nominated
National Lithuanian Film Awards 2022 (Silver Crane)	2022	Best Costume	Fausta Naujalė	Nominated
National Lithuanian Film Awards 2022 (Silver Crane)	2022	Audience Award	Andrius Blaževičius	Selected
Tallinn Black Nights Film Festival 2021	2021	Best Film - Baltic Competicion	Andrius Blaževičius	Won
Riga International Film Festival 2021	2021	Best Film, International competition	Andrius Blaževičius	Won
Karlovy Vary International Film Festival 2021	2021	Best Film, International competition	Andrius Blaževičius	Selected
