= Kings' Shift =

- Directed by: Ignas Miškinis
- Written by: Saulius Drunga; Ignas Miškinis
- Produced by: Ieva Norvilienė; Janis Kalejs
- Starring: Vainius Sodeika; Dainius Gavenonis; Aistė Diržiūtė; Vidas Petkevičius; Paulius Ignatavičius; Juozas Rapalis
- Music by: Edgars Rubenis
- Release date: April 9, 2016 (Vilnius Film Festival)
- Running time: 100 minutes
- Countries: Lithuania; Latvia
- Language: Lithuanian

Kings' Shift (Lithuanian: Karalių Pamaina (Note: The term "Karalių pamaina" (kings' shift) is the Lithuanian term used in hospitals for a shift during the holiday nights.)) is a 2016 Latvian-Lithuanian film directed by Ignas Miškinis. It is about a policeman who is left without change in a private clinic to guard a comatose suspect of World War II war crimes.

== Plot ==
A rookie policeman in a private clinic guarding a comatose suspect of World War II war crimes is left without replacement on his shift. However, the policeman is determined not to leave his post without orders. Lack of sleep, loneliness, hunger and the persistence to serve his duty, however, with growing doubts, put the young man into a difficult position. He must decide how far he can go guarding this suspect.

== Cast ==
- Vainius Sodeika as Kastytis, the policeman
- Aistė Diržiūtė as Julija, a nurse and a granddaughter of Vytautas
- Dainius Gavenonis as a doctor
- Vidas Petkevičius as Vytautas, Julija's grandfather
- Paulius Ignatavičius as a private clinic guard
- Juozas Rapalis

== Awards ==
2016: Sidabrinė gervė Best Composer's Work of the Year – Edgars Rubenis
