= Summer Survivors =

2018 Lithuanian romantic film

- Original poster of the movie Summer Survivors 2018
- Directed by: Marija Kavtaradzė
- Written by: Marija Kavtaradzė
- Produced by: Marija Razgutė
- Starring: Indrė Patkauskaitė: Gelminė Glemžaitė; Vilija Grigaitytė
- Cinematography: Laurynas Bareiša: Vytautas Katkus
- Edited by: Domas Petronis
- Music by: Domas Strupinskas
- Production company: M-Films
- Release date: 2018
- Running time: 91 minutes
- Country: Lithuania
- Language: Lithuanian

Summer Survivors (Lithuanian: Išgyventi vasarą) is a 2018 Lithuanian drama film written and directed by Marija Kavtaradzė.

It aims to portray mental illnesses, their impact on the lives of young adults, and their resilience.

The film had its world premiere on September 7, 2018, at the Toronto International Film Festival, its European premiere at the Tallinn Black Nights Film Festival on November 22, 2018, and its Lithuanian premiere at the Vilnius International Film Festival (Kino Pavasaris) in April 2019.

== Synopsis ==
An ambitious young research psychologist, Indrė, portrayed by Indrė Patkauskaitė, agrees to transport two patients, played by Gelminė Glemžaitė and Paulius Markevičius, from one psychiatric unit to another in exchange for research privileges at her clinic. She finds herself the leader of a rather rag-tag band on the long journey to the sea. Outgoing Paulius is a young man whose manic stage of his bipolar disorder stands in great contrast to the introvert Justė whose wounds are hidden from sight, but they both struggle to fight the inner battles that define them. As they all navigate the survival process together, what looks like a carefree summer ride with friends sharing laughs from the outside, could actually be the beginning of healing in this bittersweet story that — just like summer — is full of hopes, surprises and the promise that anything is possible.

== Distribution ==
- Indrė Patkauskaitė: Indrė
- Gelminė Glemžaitė: Justė
- Paulius Markevičius: Paulius
- Vilija Grigaitytė: Danguolė
- Giedrė Gudeikienė: Cafeteria Employee
- Giedrius Juršys: Nurse
- Adrija Čepaitė-Palšauskienė: Doctor
- Larisa Kalpokaitė: Doctor Jolanta
- Karolis Kaupinis: Doctor
- Danas Kavaliauskas: Automechanic's Son
- Tekle Kavtaradzė: Waitress
- Giedrius Kiela: Patient
- Ligita Kondrotaitė: Doctor
- Jurgis Marčėnas: Nurse
- Inga Maškarina: Patient
- Darius Meškauskas: Algis
- Lilija Milašienė: Austė's Mother
- Juozas Milašius: Austė's Father
- Robertas Narkus: Gas Station Attendant
- Šarūnas Puidokas: Automechanic
- Lina Rastokaitė: Nurse
- Inga Šepetkaitė: Young Woman at Gas Station
- Dovilė Šilkaitytė: Patient
- Agnė Sirgėdaitė: Palanga Waitress
- Julija Steponaityte: Julija
- Ieva Triskauskaitė: Austė
- Aldona Vilutytė: Doctor
- Donatas Želvys: Brother Laurynas
- Šarūnas Zenkevičius: Laughing Man

== Production ==
This film is the debut film written and directed by Marija Kavtaradzė.

This is the first collaboration between Marija Kavtaradzė, as a director and writer, and producer Marija Razgutė, following Kavtaradzė's co-writing on the film The Saint produced by M-Films.

Summer Survivors achieved 26k admissions in the Lithuanian box office, making it the most appreciated independent Lithuanian film in 2019.

Filming began on 24 August 2017, and ended on 25 September 2017.

== Reception ==
The film received generally positive reviews from both critics and audiences, with an average score of 7.5/10 based on over 1500 collected votes on the IMDb.

== Accolades ==
Award	Date	Category	Recipients	Results
Lithuanian National Film Award 2021	2021	Best Screenplay	Marija Kavtaradzė	Nominated
Lithuanian National Film Award 2021	2021	Best Supporting Actress	Vilija Grigaitytė	Nominated
Lithuanian National Film Award 2021	2021	Public choice	Marija Kavtaradzė	Won
Lithuanian National Film Award 2021	2021	Best Actor	Paulius Markevičius	Nominated
Lithuanian National Film Award 2021	2021	Best Actress	Indrė Patkauskaitė	Nominated
Lithuanian National Film Award 2021	2021	Best Film Nomination	Marija Kavtaradzė	Nominated
Lithuanian National Film Award 2021	2021	Best Director	Marija Kavtaradzė	Nominated
Silver Crane Lithuanian Film Award 2019	2019	Best Film of 2019	Marija Kavtaradzė	Nominated
Silver Crane Lithuanian Film Award 2019	2019	Best Director Nomination	Marija Kavtaradzė	Nominated
Silver Crane Lithuanian Film Award 2019	2019	Best Actress	Indrė Patkauskaitė	Won
Silver Crane Lithuanian Film Award 2019	2019	Best Actor	Paulius Markevičius	Nominated
Silver Crane Lithuanian Film Award 2019	2019	Best Supporting Actress	Vilija Grigaitytė	Nominated
Silver Crane Lithuanian Film Award 2019	2019	Best Supporting Actor	Darius Meškauskas	Nominated
Silver Crane Lithuanian Film Award 2019	2019	Best Screenplay	Marija Kavtaradzė	Nominated
Silver Crane Lithuanian Film Award 2019	2019	Audience Award	Marija Kavtaradzė	Nominated
Vilnius International Film Festival 2019 - New Europe	2019	Best Film Award	Marija Kavtaradzė	Nominated
Vilnius International Film Festival 2019 - New Europe	2019	Best Actor	Paulius Markevičius	Won
Vilnius International Film Festival 2019 - New Europe	2019	Public Award	Marija Kavtaradzė	Won
Riviera International Film Festival 2019	2019	Best Film Award	Marija Kavtaradzė (Director) and Marija Razgutė (Producer)	Won
Riviera International Film Festival 2019	2019	Best Director	Marija Kavtaradzė	Nominated
Riviera International Film Festival 2019	2019	Best Actress	Indrė Patkauskaitė	Nominated
Riviera International Film Festival 2019	2019	Best Actor	Paulius Markevičius	Nominated
Lithuanian Association of Cinematographers (L.A.C)	2019	Best Cinematography	Rugilė Barzdžiukaitė and Laurynas Bareiša	Nominated
International Film Festival Film by the Sea 2019	2019	International Student Award for Best Film	Marija Kavtaradze	Nominated
Athena International Film Festival 2018	2018	Best Film	Marija Kavtaradze	Nominated
