= Cherries (film) =

2022 Lithuanian short

- Poster
- Lithuanian: Uogos
- Directed by: Vytautas Katkus
- Written by: Vytautas Katkus
- Produced by: Marija Razgutė, Brigita Beniušytė
- Starring: Vytautas Katkus: Viktoras Katkus
- Cinematography: Simonas Glinskis
- Edited by: Laurynas Bareisa
- Production company: M-FILMS
- Distributed by: Lights on
- Release date: 27 March 2022 (Cannes)
- Running time: 15 minutes
- Country: Lithuania
- Language: Lithuanian

Cherries (Lithuanian: Uogos) is a Lithuanian short film written and directed by Vytautas Katkus and released in 2022.

== Plot ==
A recently retired father invites his son to help him with the cherry picking in the garden. The father is in no hurry to finish the cherry job though, as he tries to catch up with his son. The cherries remain in the background.

== Production ==
Cherries is the third film by Vytautas Katkus and his second selection for the director at the Cannes Film Festival (2022), with his previous short film Collective Gardens (2019) becoming the first Lithuanian film to participate in the Critics' Week program at Cannes.

After several collaborations as a cameraman, Cherries marks Vytautas Katkus's first collaboration with producer Marija Razgutė of M-Films as a director. Shot in two and a half days, the short film Cherries features mostly non-professional actors, including the director's family members and the twins who are former classmates.

His first feature film, The Visitor, is currently in development and will also be produced by M-Films.

== Cast ==
- Viktoras Katkus as Himself
- Vytautas Katkus as Himself
- Audrius Lučiūnas as Twin #1
- Vitalijus Lučiūnas as Twin #2
- Vismantė Ruzgaitė as Woman

== Accolades ==
Award	Date	Category	Recipients	Result
Kyiv International Short Film Festival 2022	2022	International	Vytautas Katkus	Nominated
Valladolid International Film Festival 2022	2022	International	Vytautas Katkus	Nominated
Uppsala International Short Film Festival 2022	2022	International	Vytautas Katkus	Nominated
Hamptons International Film Festival 2022	2022	Narrative short	Vytautas Katkus	Nominated
Nashville Film Festival 2022	2022	The Edge Shorts	Vytautas Katkus	Nominated
Doku Fest 2022	2022	International	Vytautas Katkus	Nominated
European Film Awards	2022	Short Film	Vytautas Katkus	Candidate
Cannes Film Festival 2022	2022	Short film	Vytautas Katkus	Nominated
Riga International Short Film Festival 2023	2023	International	Vytautas Katkus	Nominated
Lithuanian Film Awards 2023	2023	Short film	Vytautas Katkus	Nominated
Vilnius International Film Festival 2023	2023	Best Lithuanian Short Film	Vytautas Katkus	Won
Clermont-Ferrand International Short Film Festival 2023	2023	International competition	Vytautas Katkus	Nominated
