= Dog's Life (disambiguation) =

Dog's Life is a 2003 video game for the Sony PlayStation 2.

Dog's Life or A Dog's Life may refer to:

== Music ==
- "A Dog's Life", a song by Nina Nastasia, from the album Dogs
- "Dog's Life", a song by eels from the Welcome to Woop Woop soundtrack
- "Dog's Life", a song by Gentle Giant, from the album Octopus

== Literature ==
- "Dog's Life", short story by Martha Soukup
- A Dog's Life, 1987 collection of short stories by Ma Jian
- A Dog's Life, 1995 novel by Peter Mayle with Ed Koren
- A Dog's Life, 1996 English translation by Anthea Bell of Der Hund kommt!, 1987 children's novel by Christine Nöstlinger
- A Dog's Life: The Autobiography of a Stray, 2005 children's novel by Ann M. Martin

== TV and film ==
- Dog's Life (film), a 2013 Lithuanian film
- A Dog's Life (1918 film), a silent film written and directed by Charlie Chaplin
- A Dog's Life (1943 film), a French comedy film
- A Dog's Life (1950 film), an Italian film starring Gina Lollobrigida
- Another name for the 1962 film Mondo Cane
- "McGurk: A Dog's Life", an unsold 1979 TV pilot by Norman Lear and starring Barney Martin
- "A Dog's Life" (Butterflies), a 1979 television episode
- "A Dog's Life", a 2005 episode of Pocoyo
- "A Dog Life", a 1991 episode of Shining Time Station
- A Dog's Life (radio drama), a 1951 Australian radio drama

== See also ==
- It's a Dog's Life (disambiguation)
