= Bridges of Time =

2018 film

- Film poster
- Directed by: Kristine Briede; Audrius Stonys
- Release date: 1 July 2018 (Karlovy Vary IFF)
- Running time: 78 minutes
- Country: Lithuania
- Language: Lithuanian

Bridges of Time (Lithuanian: Laiko tiltai) is a 2018 Lithuanian documentary film directed by Kristīne Briede and Audrius Stonys. It was selected as the Lithuanian entry for the Best International Feature Film at the 92nd Academy Awards, but it was not nominated. The film won the Golden Goblet Award for Best Documentary Film at the 22nd Shanghai International Film Festival.

== Premise ==
A documentary about the "Baltic New Wave", avant-garde filmmakers in Estonia, Latvia and Lithuania during the 1960s.

== See also ==
- List of submissions to the 92nd Academy Awards for Best International Feature Film
- List of Lithuanian submissions for the Academy Award for Best International Feature Film
