= Granauskas =

- Lithuanian surname
- m.: Granauskas
- f.: (unmarried): Granauskaitė
- f.: (married): Granauskienė
- Related names: Granowski, Granovsky

Granauskas is a Lithuanian surname, from Polish Granowski. Notable people with the surname include:

- Romualdas Granauskas
