= Marija Razgutė =

Lithuania film producer

- Born: 26 June 1985 (age 41); Klaipėda, Lithuania
- Occupation: Producer
- Notable work: Slow; Nova Lituania; Runner; Cherries
- Website: M-Films

Marija Razgutė (born 26 June 1985) is a Lithuanian film producer and the founder of the production company M-Films.

== Biography ==
Marija Razgutė was born on 26 June 1985 in Klaipėda, Lithuania.

She initially studied business management but later switched to a master's degree in cultural management and cultural policy at the Vilnius Academy of Arts, which she completed in 2010. During her studies, she produced the short film Suicide directed by Mindaugas Sruogius in 2008, which won the Silver Crane Award for the Best Student Short Film from the Lithuanian Film Academy.

In 2008, Marija Razgutė founded the production company M-Films. She initially produced short films and later developed Lithuanian films and international co-productions (Spain, France, Sweden, Germany, Georgia, Czech Republic). She collaborated with directors such as Karolis Kaupinis, Andrius Blaževičius, Marija Kavtaradzė, and Vytautas Katkus on short films and their debut feature films.

Among her notable productions are Slow, the second feature film by Marija Kavtaradze, which won the Best Directing award at the 2023 Sundance Film Festival, Nova Lituania by Karolis Kaupinis, which was Lithuania's submission to the 93rd Academy Awards, and Cherries by Vytautas Katkus, which participated in the 2022 Cannes Film Festival for the Palme d'Or for Best Short Film.

Since 2011, Marija Razgutė has been a member of the Association of Independent Producers of Lithuania and has been a board member since 2016. She has also been a member of the European Film Academy since 2015 and EWA Network since 2018, and has hosted the Pop Up Film Residency Vilnius since 2020.

In addition, Marija Razgutė has participated in and received intensive trainings from various film workshops, including MAIA 2013–2014, EAVE Producers Workshop 2016, Producer on the Move 2020, ACE producers 2020, and ACE Leadership 2022.

She worked on the debut feature film by Vytautas Katkus - The Visitor and the second feature film by Karolis Kaupinis — Hunger Strike Breakfast with her production company M-Films.

== Filmography ==
=== As a producer ===
- 2008 : Suicide directed by Mindaugas Sruogius (fiction / short film / Lithuania)
- 2011 : Ten Reasons directed by Andrius Blaževičius (fiction / short film / Lithuania)
- 2013 : Dog’s Life directed by Ieva Veiverytė (fiction / short film / Lithuania)
- 2013 : Identities directed by Aistė Žegulytė (documentary / short film / Lithuania)
- 2013 : The Noisemaker directed by Karolis Kaupinis (fiction / short film / Lithuania)
- 2014 : I'm Twenty Something directed by Marija Kavtaradzė (fiction / short film / Lithuania)
- 2015 : Woods directed by Ignas Meilūnas (animation / short film / Lithuania)
- 2015 : The Amateur directed by Audrius Antanavičius (documentary / short film / Lithuania)
- 2016 : The Saint directed by Andrius Blaževičius (fiction / feature film / Lithuania)
- 2017 : The Mother's Day directed by Kamilė Milašiūtė (fiction / short film / Lithuania)
- 2017 : Watchkeeping directed by Karolis Kaupinis (fiction / short film / Lithuania)
- 2018 : Summer Survivors directed by Marija Kavtaradzė (fiction / 91 min / Lithuania)
- 2019 : Matilda and the Spare Head directed by Ignas Meilūnas (animation / short film / Lithuania)
- 2019 : Nova Lituania directed by Karolis Kaupinis (fiction / feature film / Lithuania)
- 2021 : Runner directed by Andrius Blaževičius (fiction / feature film / Lithuania)
- 2022 : Cherries directed by Vytautas Katkus (fiction / 15 min / Lithuania)
- 2023 : Slow directed by Marija Kavtaradzė (fiction / 108 min / Lithuania, Spain, Sweden)
- 2024 : The Visitor directed by Vytautas Katkus (fiction / feature film / Lithuania, France / in development)
- 2024 : Hunger Strike Breakfast directed by Karolis Kaupinis (fiction / feature film / Lithuania / in development)
- 2026: How to Divorce during the War directed by Andrius Blaževičius (fiction / 108 min / Lithuania, Luxembourg, Ireland, Czech Republic)

=== Minor Participation (Co-Production) ===
- 2018 : Trot by Xacio Baño
- 2020 : Otar’s Death by Ioseb Soso Bliadze
- 2021 : Out of Sync by Juanjo Giménez
- 2023 : Life Interrupted by Ilze Kunga-Melgaile

== Awards and honors ==
Festival and Year	Category	Name of the Movie(s)	Result (Win or Nominated)
Lithuanian Film Academy "Silver Crane" Awards 2017	Best Personal Achievement	The Saint, The Mother's Day, and Watchkeeping	Nominated
Riviera International Film Festival 2019	Special Jury Prize	Summer Survivors	Shared award with director Marija Kavtaradzė
Riviera International Film Festival 2019	Best Cinematography	Summer Survivors	Shared nomination with director Marija Kavtaradzė
Lithuanian Film Academy "Silver Crane" Awards 2022	Best Co-Production	Out of Sync	Nominated
