= Greta Grinevičiūtė =

Lithuanian actress, choreographer, and dancer

- Born: 18 September 1990 (age 35); Palanga, Lithuania
- Occupations: Actress, choreographer, dancer
- Notable work: Slow
- Website: Official Website

Greta Grinevičiūtė (born 18 September 1990) is a Lithuanian actress, choreographer, and dancer.

== Biography ==
Greta Grinevičiūtė was born on 18 September 1990, in Palanga, Lithuania.

She holds a bachelor's degree in contemporary dance and drama and pursued a Master's in Arts at the Lithuanian Academy of Music and Theatre between 2013 and 2015.

From 2015 onwards, she has been involved in numerous film and theater projects as an actress, choreographer, and dancer. Greta Grinevičiūtė has participated in various dance performances with different choreographers, including AIROS dance theatre, Vytis Jankauskas Dance Theatre, Mauricia Berreira's Nueves Anesthetize (premiere in 2019 at the GUIdance festival, Guimaraes, Portugal), Simon Pederson, Tony Vezich, and Andrius Katinas.

In 2016, she choreographed and directed the critically acclaimed stage performance B&B Dialogue which was nominated for the Lithuanian Theatre Academy's Best Dance Piece of the Year.

In 2017, Grinevičiūtė and Agnietė Lisičkinaitė founded the independent dance company B&B, creating, choreographing, and performing three dance works between 2017 and 2020.

In 2023, she played the lead role in the Lithuanian film Slow directed by Marija Kavtaradzė. The film premiered at the Sundance Film Festival in 2023, where Marija Kavtaradzė won the Best Director award.

Since 2016, she has been a member of the board of the Lithuanian Association of Contemporary Dance and a member of the professional theater MMLAB in Vilnius since 2018.

== Selected Choreographies in Contemporary Dance Performances ==
- 2016: B&B Dialogue
- 2018: Dance for a Vacuum Cleaner and Father (Mono performance, Arts Printing house)
- 2020: I'm Going to Buy Some Milk
- 2020: Dance for a Washing Machine and Mother
- 2021: Dance for an Object and Child
- 2021: Bath

== Theater ==
=== Performer ===
- 2015: YesMoonCan
- 2015: The Ball
- 2016: Honour for Grandmother
- 2016: Things
- 2017: Bad Weather
- 2018: Unlearned Lessons
- 2019: Olympian Machine
- 2020: Navigations
- 2020: Pluto

=== Choreographer ===
- 2017: The Matters
- 2018: Urod
- 2019: The Seagull
- 2019: 12 Grams to the North
- 2019: Manuliukai

== Filmography ==
- 2016: Faked David (fiction / short film / Lithuania)
- 2017: Yana (fiction / 30 / Lithuania)
- 2018: Prisitaikymas (fiction / short film / Lithuania)
- 2019: Miraculous Light of the Bonfire Lights Up the Future directed by Petras Kuneika (fiction / 10 min / Lithuania)
- 2023: Slow (fiction / 108 min / Lithuania, Spain, Sweden)

== Awards and honors ==
- Lithuanian Theatre Academy 2016: Nomination for Best Dance Piece of the Year for B&B Dialogue
- Lithuanian National Academy of Contemporary Dance 2018: Most Memorable Creative Work of the Year Award for Dance for a Vacuum Cleaner and Father
- Lithuanian Theatre Academy 2020: Nomination for the Lithuanian Theatre "Golden Stage Cross" awards for Best Dance Piece of the Year for I'm Going to Buy Some Milk
