= Vytautas Katkus =

Lithuanian film director and cinematographer

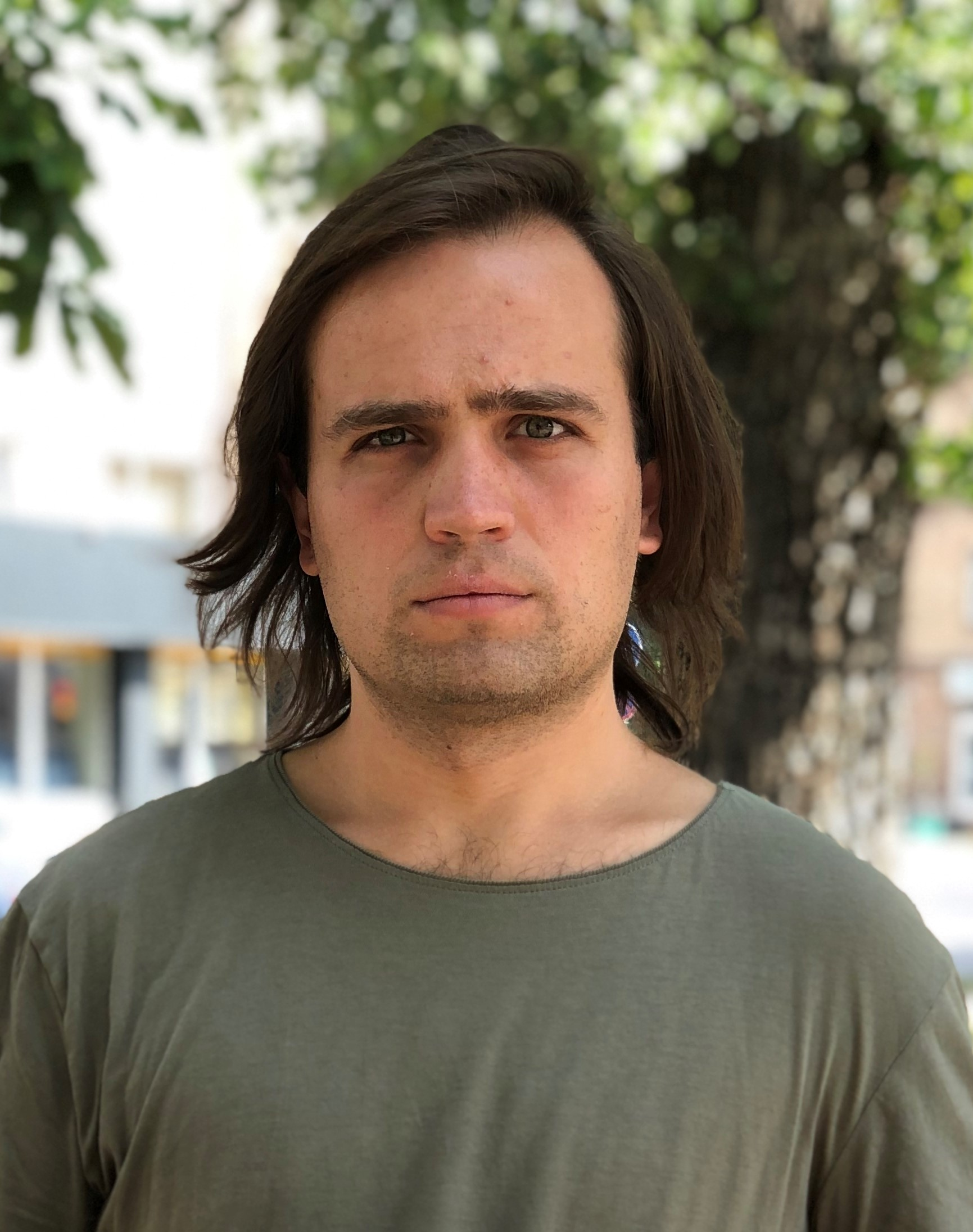
- Vytautas Katkus in 2023
- Born: 3 September 1991; Vilnius, Lithuania
- Occupations: Film director, cinematographer
- Notable work: Cherries; Community Garden; Places

Vytautas Katkus (born 3 September 1991) is a Lithuanian film director, cinematographer, and screenwriter.

== Biography ==
Vytautas Katkus was born on 3 September 1991, in Vilnius, Lithuania.

He graduated from the Lithuanian Academy of Music and Theatre with a master's degree in cinematography and directing in 2014, and began working as a camera assistant on around twenty films and commercials in Lithuania and abroad.

Vytautas Katkus has twice won the award for Best Young Director of photography from the Lithuanian Association of Directors of Photography, of which he has been a member since 2016.

In 2019, his first short film Collective Gardens was selected for the Cannes Film Festival's Critics' Week, and his second short film Places premiered in 2020 at the Venice Film Festival as part of the Orizzonti program.

After several collaborations as a cinematographer and cameraman with producer Marija Razgutė and M-Films, he directed his third short film, Cherries, in 2022, produced by M-Films, which was selected in the short film category at the Cannes Film Festival.

Vytautas Katkus is currently developing his first feature film, The Visitor, with screenwriter Marija Kavtaradzė and producer Marija Razgutė, a second collaboration with M-films and other international partners like Totem Films (France).

On each of his projects as a director, Vytautas Katkus had assistant director Robertas Nevecka.

== Filmography ==
=== Director ===
- 2011 : Išskalbta pasaka (fiction / short film / Lithuania)
- 2014 : Parketo skutėjai (fiction / short film / Lithuania)
- 2015 : Igloo (fiction / short film / Lithuania)
- 2019 : Community Gardens (fiction / short film / Lithuania)
- 2020 : Places (fiction / short film / Lithuania)
- 2022 : Cherries (fiction / 15 min / Lithuania)
- 2025 : The Visitor (fiction / feature film / Lithuania, Norway, Sweden)

=== Cinematographer ===
- 2016 : 12 kėdžių directed by Algis Ramanauskas (fiction).
- 2017 : Antikvariniai Kašpirovskio dantys – Indai directed by Saulius Baradinskas (music video).
- 2017 : Hamster House directed by Titas Laucius (documentary short film).
- 2017 : Kambariokai directed by Titas Laucius (short film).
- 2018 : Summer Survivors directed by Marija Kavtaradzė, Laurynas Bareiša (fiction).
- 2018 : Animus Animalis directed by Aistė Žegulytė (documentary).
- 2019 : Monique - Virš vandens directed by Saulius Baradinskas (music video).
- 2019 : Nacionalinės premijos laureatų vaikai directed by Kamilė Milašiūtė (short film).
- 2019 : Community Gardens directed by Vytautas Katkus (short film).
- 2019 : Auksinės minutės directed by Saulius Baradinskas (short film).
- 2019 : From Mother to Daughter directed by Vytautas Puidokas (experimental film).
- 2020 : Places directed by Vytautas Katkus (short film).
- 2021 : The Roop – Discoteque directed by Saulius Baradinskas (music video).
- 2021 : The Roop – OhMyGodable directed by Saulius Baradinskas (music video).
- 2021 : Automobilių stovėjimo aikštelė directed by Jorė Janavičiūtė (short film).
- 2021 : Nevermore 2021|Nevermore directed by Gerda Paliušytė (experimental documentary).
- 2021 : Techno, mama directed by Saulius Baradinskas (short film).
- 2021 : Motinos directed by Birutė Kapustinskaitė (short film).
- 2022 : Pasakyk, kad myli directed by Elena Rožukaitė (short film).
- 2022 : Kaip būti žmogumi? directed by Jorė Janavičiūtė (short film).
- 2022 : Businessman directed by Lukas Kacinauskas (short film).
- 2023 : Happy Next Year directed by Lukas Kacinauskas (short film).
- 2024 : Toxic directed by Saulė Bliuvaitė (feature film).

== Awards ==
=== Accolades ===
Festival and Year	Category	Name of the Movie	Result (Win or Nominated)
Vilnius International Film Festival Kino pavasaris 2011	Best Student Film Award	Išskalbta pasaka	Nominated
Lithuanian Association of Cinematographers 2014	Best Short Cinematography	Parketo skutėjai	Win
Lithuanian Cinema Goes Berlin Festival 2015	Best Film Award	Igloo	Win
European Film Festival Scanorama 2015	Lithuanian short	Igloo	Nominated
Lithuanian Film Awards 2019	Best Director	Community Gardens	Win
Cannes' Festival 2019	Semaine de la Critique	Community Gardens	Selected
Concorto Film Festival 2019	Best Short Film	Community Gardens	Win
Ghent International Film Festival 2019	Best Short Film	Community Gardens	Win
Helsinki International Film Festival 2019	Selections	Community Gardens	Nominated
Riga International Film Festival 2019	Selections	Community Gardens	Nominated
Venice Film Festival 2020	Orizzonti Competition	Places	Nominated
Valladolid International Film Festival 2020	Selections	Places	Nominated
Ghent International Film Festival 2020	Selections	Places	Nominated
Cannes Film Festival 2022	International short	Cherries	Nominated
Telluride Film Festival 2022	International short	Cherries	Nominated
Valladolid International Film Festival 2022	International short	Cherries	Nominated
Ghent International Film Festival 2022	International short	Cherries	Nominated
Montreal World Film Festival 2022	International short	Cherries	Nominated
Tallinn Black Nights Film Festival 2025	Best Baltic Feature Film	The Visitor	Win
