= Aistė Diržiūtė =

Lithuanian actress

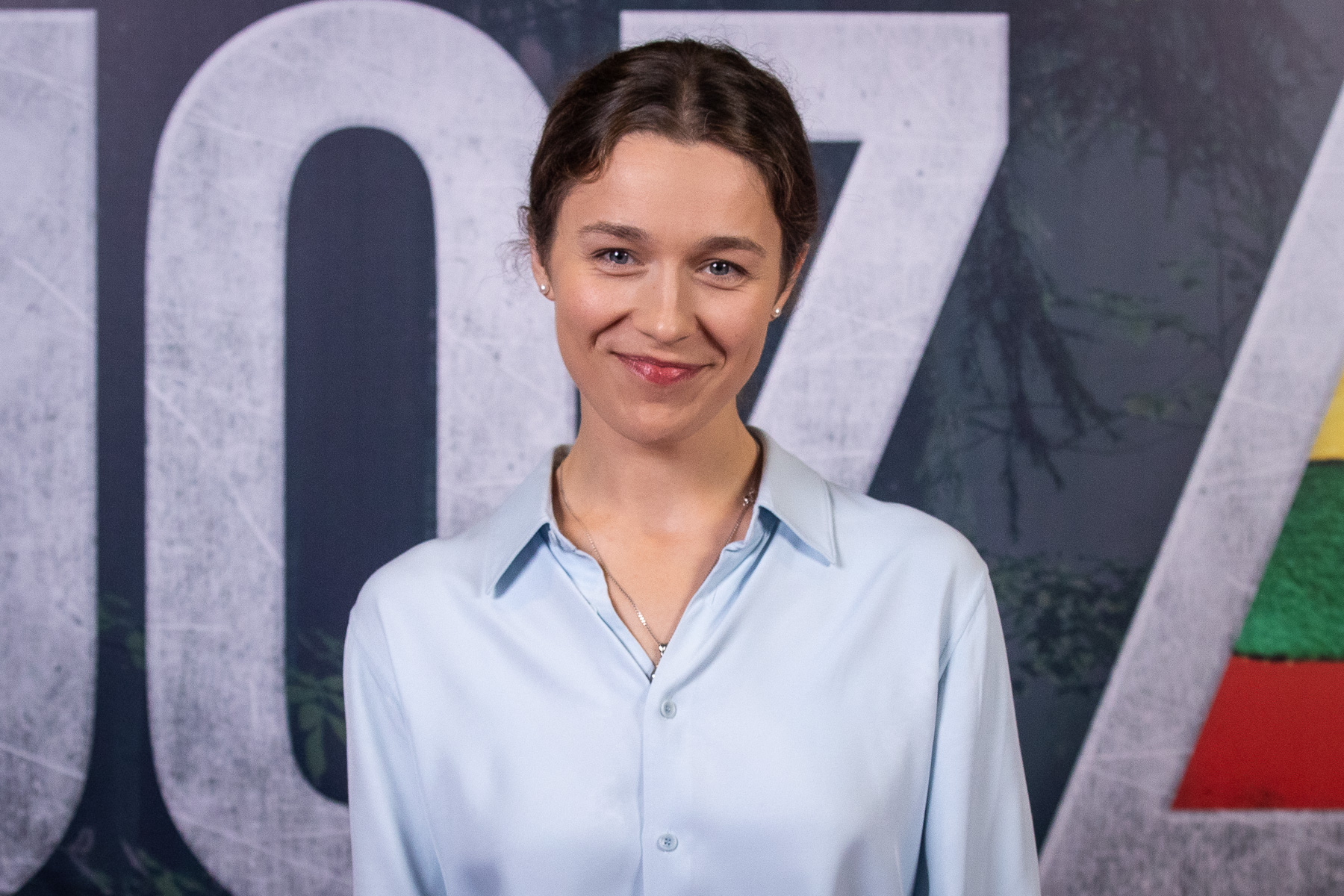
- Aistė Diržiūtė (2023)
- Born: 18 October 1991 (age 34); Vilkaviškis, Lithuania
- Occupation: Actress
- Years active: 2011–present

Aistė Diržiūtė (born 18 October 1991) is a Lithuanian actress best known for her role as Austė in The Summer of Sangaile (Lithuanian: Sangailė or Sangailės Vasara).

== Biography ==
=== Early life and career beginnings ===
Diržiūtė was born in Vilkaviškis.

From 1998 to 2005, Diržiūtė studied piano at a Vilkaviškis music school. In 2010 she moved to Vilnius where she studied music at the Vilnius college of higher education for a year and then entered the Lithuanian Academy of Music and Theatre. During her studies, Diržiūtė appeared in several commercials and got small roles in TV series.

=== 2015-2016: Breakthrough ===
"I both cried and laughed with happiness when I heard this news on the phone. Words cannot describe the feeling."

— Diržiūtė about being named one of the European Shooting Stars in 2015

In 2015 Diržiūtė made her film debut. She co-starred in Robert Mullan's movie based on real events, We Will Sing, and was cast as one of the lead roles in Alantė Kavaitė's The Summer of Sangaile.

After The Summer of Sangaile premiered at the Berlin International Film Festival, Diržiūtė was noticed by film critics and became the first Lithuanian actress named as one of the European Shooting Stars, alongside actors such as Maisie Williams and Moe Dunford. Diržiūtė also won the award for Best Lithuanian Actress at the Vilnius International Film Festival and was nominated for both Sidabrinė gervė and KINFO awards.

After her success, she became a face of the “Body Talk” women's clothing collection in May 2015.

In 2016, Diržiūtė starred in Kings' Shift directed by Ignas Miškinis and the short film Back directed by Gabrielė Urbonaitė. Both films premiered at the Vilnius International Film Festival. She plays the role of Simona in an independent short, Sexy to the Point, produced by students from Lithuanian Academy of Music and Theatre.

=== 2017–present: International career ===
After the success in Diržiūtė's home country Lithuania, actress started to work in foreign productions. In 2017 Diržiūtė starred in Russian biographical drama Kharms about an early Soviet-era surrealist and absurdist poet Daniil Kharms. Diržiūtė portrayed poet's second wife Marina Malich. The movie had its premiere in 20th Shanghai International Film Festival, winning two awards for Best screenplay and Best cinematography.

In 2018 Diržiūtė starred in Latvian-British historical fiction film The Pagan King, directed by Latvian director Aigars Grauba.

In 2018 Diržiūtė played Joana in a film Ashes in the Snow, based on the best-selling book Between Shades of Gray by Ruta Sepetys. It follows the Stalinist repressions of the mid-20th century and follows the life of young girl Lina as she is deported from her native Lithuania with her mother and younger brother, and the journey they take to a labor camp in Siberia.

Diržiūtė appeared with actor Rom Blanco in Men in Black: International as a couple at Eiffel Tower.

== Personal life ==
=== Sidabrinė Gervė 2018 speech ===
Before presenting an award for best actor in Sidabrinė Gervė 2018 awards, Diržiūtė made a speech about the current situation in the film industry in Lithuania and around the world. During the speech, actress mentioned her The Summer of Sangailė co-star Julija Steponaitytė and Paulė Bocullaitė and thanked for their bravery to speak out against sexual harassment.

== Filmography ==
Films
Year	Title	Role	Notes
2015	We Will Sing	Agnė	
2015	The Summer of Sangaile	Austė	
2016	Kings' Shift	Julija	
2016	Back	Alina	Short
2016	Sexy to the Point	Simona	Short
2017	Kharms	Marina Malich	
2018	The Pagan King	Lauga	
2018	Ashes in the Snow	Joana	
2018	Hopscotch and the Christmas Tree	Hopscotch (voice)	Short; Lithuanian dubbing
2019	Je Suis Une Revolution	Mergina	Short
2019	Men in Black: International	Jenny	
2019	Gently Into The Night	Faith	Short; Post-production
2019	Life in a Dream	Karol	Short;
2020	By Your Side		Short; Post-Production
2020	The Lawyer	Emilija	Post-Production
Television
Year	Title	Role	Notes
2013	Moterų Laimė	Journalist	1 episode
2013	Kriminalistai	Inga Mulytė	1 episode
Theatre
Year	Title	Role	Notes
2011	The House of Bernarda Alba	Adela	
2014–2015	Devynbėdžiai	Žemgulienė	
2014–2015	Remote Vilnius		
2015	Humiliated and Insulted	Katerina Fiodorovna	
Music Videos
Year	Song title	Artist	Notes
2015	"Unity"	Deeper Upper	Cameo
2015	"Į Venesuelą"	Antikvariniai Kašpirovskio Dantys	Cameo
2016	"Nobody Loves Me Like You"	Low Roar	

== Awards and nominations ==
Year	Organisation	Nominated work	Award	Result	Ref
2013	Laimonas Noreika declamation contest			Won	
2015	Berlin International Film Festival	The Summer of Sangaile	Shooting Stars Award	Won	
2015	Vilnius International Film Festival	The Summer of Sangaile	Best Actress	Won	
2015	Sidabrinė gervė	The Summer of Sangaile	Best Actress	Nominated	
2016	KINFO Awards	The Summer of Sangaile	Actress of The Year	Nominated	
