= Suicide (film) =

2008 Lithuanian short

- Lithuanian: Savižudis
- Directed by: Mindaugas Sruogius
- Written by: Mindaugas Sruogius
- Produced by: Marija Razgutė Sabina Katkevičiūtė
- Cinematography: Simonas Glinskis
- Edited by: Mindaugas Sruogius
- Production company: M-FILMS
- Release date: 2008
- Running time: 22 minutes
- Country: Lithuania
- Language: Lithuanian

Suicide (Lithuanian: Savižudis) is a Lithuanian short film written and directed by Mindaugas Sruogius and released in 2008.

== Plot ==
The film tells a story about the middle-age man who deals with the crisis in his life. His plans about the suicide are suddenly changed by a mass of awkward events that enroll during the film.

== Production ==
Suicide is the debut film of Mindaugas Sruogius and a first production for the Lithuanian producer Marija Razgutė during their respective studies at the Vilnius Academy of Arts.

This is also the first short produced by Lithuanian production company M-Films.

The film is based on the novel of the same name by Charles Bukowski.

Suicide was selected in 2009 for the Lithuanian Film Academy "Silver Crane" Awards and won the Best Student Film award.

== Cast ==
- Saulius Bareikis
- Aldona Vilutytė
- Marius Repšys
- Vainius Sodeika
