= Kęstutis Cicėnas =

Lithuanian actor

- Born: 10 October 1993; Vilnius, Lithuania
- Occupation: Actor
- Notable work: Slow; Isaac; 3 Million Euros

Kęstutis Cicėnas (born 10 October 1993) is a Lithuanian theatre, film and television actor.

== Biography ==
Kęstutis Cicėnas was born in Vilnius. From 2012 to 2016 he studied drama at the Lithuanian Academy of Music and Theatre under the guidance of Oskaras Koršunovas.

In 2015, while still a student at the academy, Kęstutis Cicėnas was selected as the best young actor at the Dalia Tamulevičiūtė Professional Theatre Festival for his role as Benjamin in the play The Martyr by Oskaras Koršunovas. He became an actor at the Lithuanian Academy of Drama in 2020, creating more than 15 characters throughout his theatre career.

Simultaneously he worked as an actor in numerous Lithuanian and international films. In 2023, he played a supporting role in the Lithuanian film Slow directed by Marija Kavtaradzė, which won the Best Director award at the 2023 Sundance Film Festival.

== Film and television ==
- 2014: After Rave (fiction / 21 min / Lithuania)
- 2015: The Summer of Sangaile directed by Alante Kavaite (fiction / 90 min / France, Lithuania, Netherlands)
- 2017: 3 Million Euros directed by Tadas Vidmantas (fiction / 90 min / Lithuania)
- 2018: Leitis (fiction / 42 min / Lithuania) directed by Andrius Bartkus
- 2019: Golden Minutes directed by Saulius Baradinskas (fiction / 10 min / Lithuania)
- 2019: Isaac directed by Jurgis Matulevicius (fiction / 1 hr 44 min / Lithuania)
- 2019: The Last Czars TV SHOW directed by Adrian McDowall (fiction / 45 min / United States)

== Theatre ==
- 2012: In Search of Lost Time directed by Oskaras Koršunovas
- 2012: Oxygen directed by Loreta Vašková
- 2013: The Wonderful and Sad Plan B directed by Vidas Bareikis at the Lithuanian National Drama Theatre
- 2013: Feast Fashion directed by Marit Sirgmets and Simona Bieksaite at the Vilnius Trade Union Chamber
- 2013: Caligula directed by Vidas Bareikis at the LTMKM
- 2014: Jekizaveta Bam directed by Oskaras Koršunovas at the Lithuanian National Drama Theatre
- 2015: Martyr directed by Oskaras Koršunovas at the Lithuanian National Drama Theatre
- 2015: Romeo and Juliet directed by Oskaras Koršunovas at the Lithuanian National Drama Theatre
- 2015: Cleansed directed by Oskaras Koršunovas at the OKT
- 2016: Childhood directed by Karolis Vilkas at the Art Printing House
- 2016: A Respectable Wedding directed by Oskaras Koršunovas at the OKT
- 2017: The Delhi Dance directed by Oskaras Koršunovas at the OKT
- 2017: Isvarymas directed by Oskaras Koršunovas at the Lithuanian National Drama Theatre
- 2017: Tartuffe directed by Oskaras Koršunovas at the Lithuanian National Drama Theatre
- 2018: Woyzeck directed by Antanas Obsarckas at the Lithuanian National Drama Theatre
- 2020: Alice in Wonderland directed by Antanas Obsarckas at the Lithuanian National Drama Theatre
- 2020: Julija directed by Kiril Glušajev at the Lithuanian National Drama Theatre
- 2021: Solaris 4 directed by Grzegorz Jarzyna at the Lithuanian National Drama Theatre
- 2021: Miegantys directed by Oskaras Koršunovas at the Lithuanian National Drama Theatre

== Awards and honors ==
- Dalia Tamulevičiūtė Professional Theatre Festival 2015: Best Young Actor Award for the role of Benjamin in the performance of Oskaras Koršunovas, based on the play Martyr by Marius von Mayenburg.
- Lithuanian Professional Theatre Festival 2015: Best Male Hope Award for the role of Benjamin in the performance of Oskar Koršunovas, based on the play Martyr by Marius von Mayenburg.
- Lithuanian Professional Theatre Festival 2017: Best Male Hope Award for the role of a man in Oskaras Koršunovas's production of Bertolt Brecht's play A Respectable Wedding.
