= Matilda and the Spare Head =

2019 Lithuanian animation film

- Lithuanian: Matilda ir atsarginė galva
- Directed by: Ignas Meilūnas
- Written by: Ignas Meilūnas; Dangiras Bugas; Miloš Macourek
- Produced by: Marija Razgutė
- Starring: Rusne Savickaite; Ignas Meilūnas; Rytis Saladzius; Dovile Sarutyte
- Cinematography: Simonas Glinskis
- Production company: M-Films
- Distributed by: Miyu
- Release date: 2019
- Running time: 12 minutes
- Country: Lithuania
- Language: Lithuanian

Matilda and the Spare Head (Lithuanian: Matilda ir atsarginė galva) is a Lithuanian short film written and directed by Ignas Meilūnas, released in 2019.

The film explores methods of school learning and the role of parents and school in the education of young children.

== Synopsis ==
The movie features a girl who wants to be the smartest person in the world. When all of the things she's learned can no longer fit in one head, her mother buys her a backup one. Two heads are better than one, but Matilda soon becomes confused which head should she wear at what time. Shortly after, she loses the second head. It is uncertain what would happen if not for a ball that accidentally flies in through her window. It changes Matilda forever.

== Cast ==
- Rusne Savickaite as Matilda
- Ignas Meilūnas as Principal
- Rytis Saladzius
- Dovile Sarutyte

== Production ==
This film is the second collaboration between director Ignas Meilūnas and producer and founder of M-Films, Marija Razgutė. His first animated short and fiction film, Woods, also produced by M-Films, won the Best Animation award from the Lithuanian Academy of Cinema in 2015.

The film premiered on June 15, 2019, at the Annecy International Animation Film Festival), and premiered in Lithuania on March 21, 2020.

The film's script is based on a story titled A Little Girl with a Spare Head by Czech poet, playwright, author, and screenwriter Miloš Macourek. Macourek was also one of the directors of the Czech version, done with Adolf Born and Jaroslav Doubrava back in 1985.

Filming took place in Vilnius, Lithuania in 2018. An exhibition at the Pamėnkalnio Gallery (Vilnius, Lithuania) from March 3, 2020, to April 3, 2020, showcases the creation process of this new stop-motion short film, including the film's sets, characters, and numerous accessories and objects related to the film, such as facial expressions, sketches, storyboards, and making-of materials.

The film screened at over 50 international festivals between 2019 and 2021 and qualified for the pre-selection of the Academy Awards 2022.

== Awards ==
- Ottawa International Animation Festival 2020 (Canada): Young Audience Award
- Black Nights Film Festival (Latvia) 2020: Best Animated Short Film
- Olympia International Film Festival for Children and Young People (Greece) 2020: Best Animated Film
- New York International Children's Film Festival (United States) 2021: Best Animated Short Film
- Fredrikstad Animation Festival (Norway) 2021: Gunnar Award for Best Children's Film
- Lithuanian National Academy of Cinema 2021: Best Animated Film
- Lisbon Animation Film Festival (Portugal) 2021: Best Animated Short Film
- Zlin Film Festival (Czech Republic) 2021: Best Short Film for Children
