= Slow (2023 film) =

2023 Lithuanian romantic film

- Sundance release poster
- Lithuanian: Tu man nieko neprimeni
- Directed by: Marija Kavtaradzė
- Written by: Marija Kavtaradzė
- Produced by: Marija Razgutė
- Starring: Greta Grinevičiūtė: Kęstutis Cicėnas; Pijus Ganusauskas; Laima Akstinaitė
- Cinematography: Laurynas Bareisa: Vytautas Katkus
- Edited by: Silvija Vilkaitė
- Music by: Irya Gmeyner; Martin Hederos; Vincent Barrière
- Production companies: M-Films; Frida Films; Garagefilm International; Film Stockholm
- Distributed by: Totem Films
- Release date: 22 January 2023 (Sundance)
- Running time: 108 minutes
- Countries: Lithuania; Spain; Sweden
- Languages: Lithuanian; English

Slow (Lithuanian: Tu man nieko neprimeni, lit. 'You Don't Remind Me of Anything') is a 2023 romantic drama film written and directed by Marija Kavtaradzė. It portrays closeness and intimacy within a relationship that challenges stereotypes and the conventional notions of a couple. The film had its world premiere in January 2023 at the Sundance Film Festival and its European premiere at the Karlovy Vary Festival in July 2023. It is a co-production between Lithuania, Spain and Sweden.

It was selected as the Lithuanian entry for the Best International Feature Film at the 96th Academy Awards.

== Plot ==
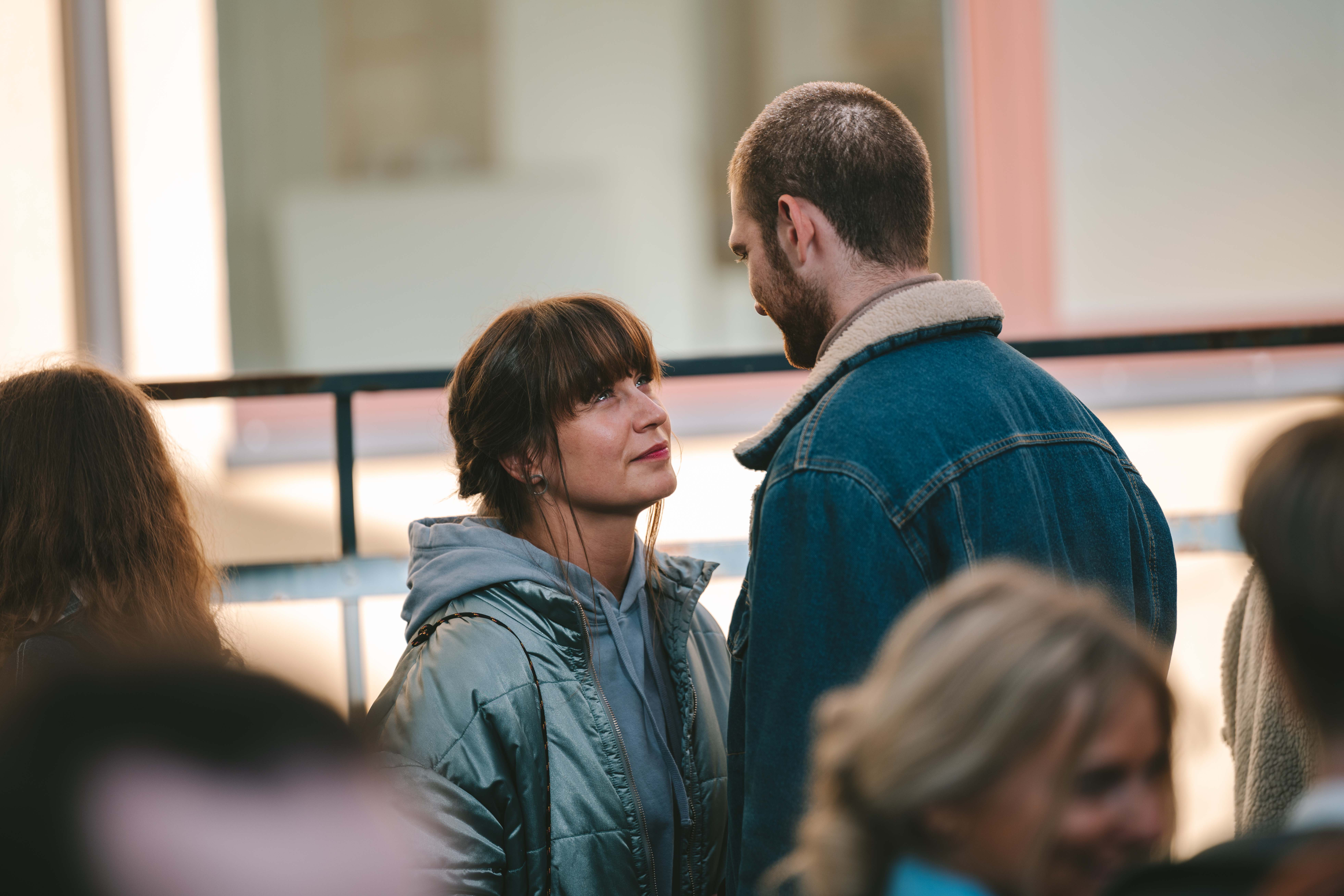
Grinevičiūtė and Cicėnas on set in 2022

Dancer Elena and asexual sign language interpreter Dovydas, portrayed by Greta Grinevičiūtė and Kęstutis Cicėnas, meet and form a beautiful bond. As they dive into a new relationship, they must navigate how to build their own kind of intimacy.

== Cast ==
- Greta Grinevičiūtė as Elena
- Kęstutis Cicėnas as Dovydas
- Pijus Ganusauskas as Vilius
- Laima Akstinaitė as Viktorija
- Vaiva Žymantė as Viltė
- Mantas Barvičius as Jokūbas
- Rimantė Valiukaitė as Elena's Mother

== Production ==
The film is written and directed by Marija Kavtaradzė, who graduated in film directing from the Lithuanian Academy of Music and Theatre in 2014. Slow is her second feature film following Summer Survivors marking her second collaboration with producer Marija Razgutė and the production company M-Films.

The movie had its world premiere on 22 January 2023, at the Sundance Film Festival.

== Reception ==
=== Critical response ===
The film received positive reviews from critics. On the review aggregator website Rotten Tomatoes, 92% of 36 critics' reviews are positive, with an average rating of 7.2/10. The website's consensus reads: "With moving performances from its leads, Slow takes its time exploring the simple and complex depths of emotional relationships."

=== Awards and nominations ===
Awards and nominations for Slow
Award	Date of ceremony	Category	Recipient(s)	Result	Ref.
Sundance Film Festival	27 January 2023	Directing Award: World Cinema	Marija Kavtaradzė	Won	
Arras Film Festival	12 November 2023	'Young Outlook' Award - Hauts-de-France Region	Slow	Won	
Atlàntida Mallorca Film Fest	9 December 2023	Grand Prize	Marija Kavtaradzė	Nominated	
European Film Awards	9 December 2023	Grand Prize	Marija Kavtaradzė	Nominated	
Les Arcs Film Festival	22 December 2023	Crystal Arrow	Marija Kavtaradzė	Won	

Several awards at the Lithuanian Sidabrinė gervė 2024 awards.

== See also ==
- List of submissions to the 96th Academy Awards for Best International Feature Film
- List of Lithuanian submissions for the Academy Award for Best International Feature Film
