= Andrius Blaževičius =

Lithuanian film director and screenwriter

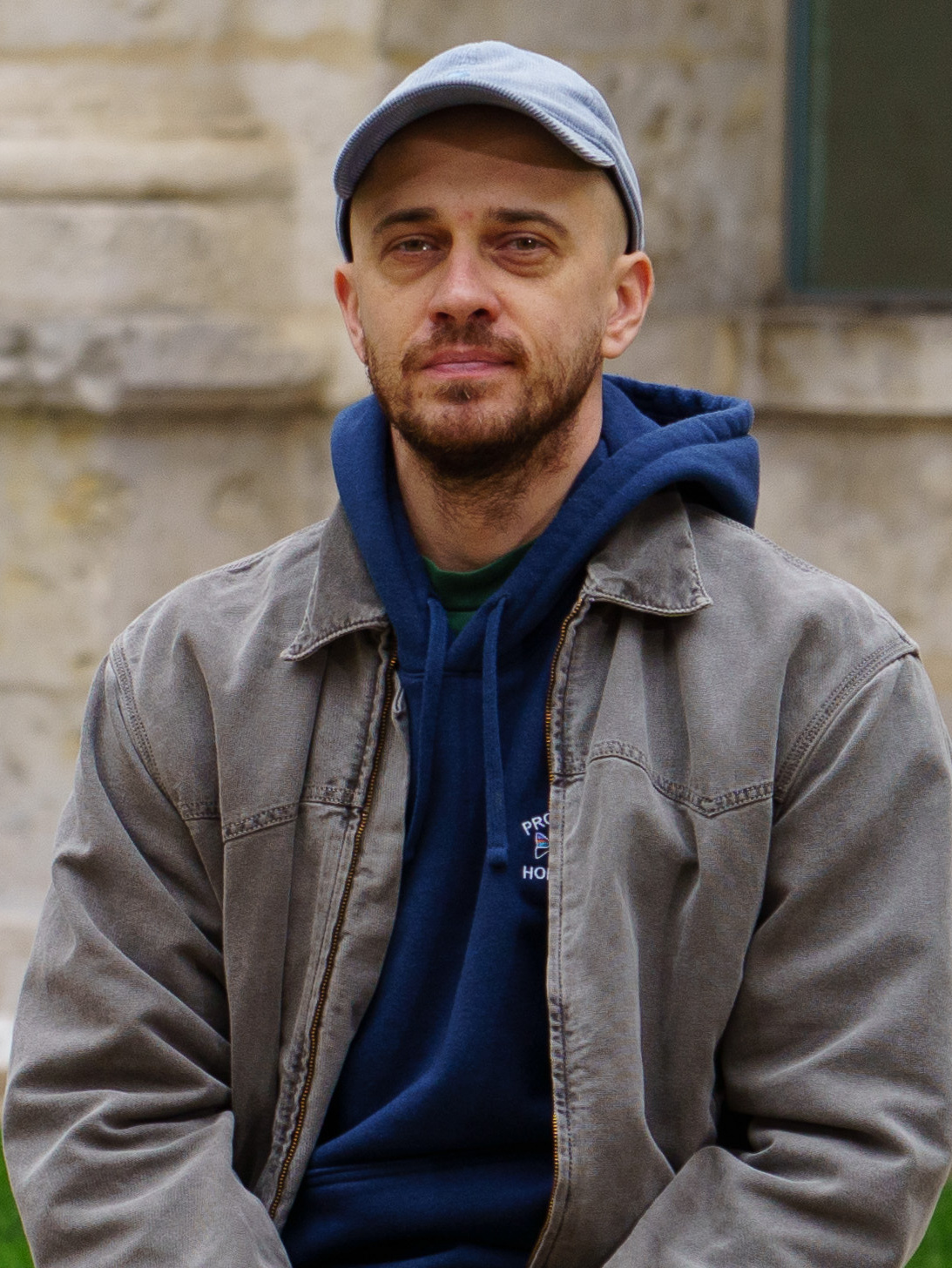
- Portrait of director Andrius Blaževičius
- Born: 26 June 1985 (age 41); Vilnius, Lithuania
- Occupations: Film director, screenwriter
- Notable work: Runner; The Saint; Ten Reasons

Andrius Blaževičius (born 26 June 1985) is a Lithuanian film director and screenwriter.

== Biography ==
Andrius Blaževičius was born in Vilnius, Lithuania. He studied cultural history and anthropology at Vilnius University for one year before pursuing studies in film direction at the Lithuanian Academy of Music and Theatre, where he earned a master's degree in 2011.

During his studies, he directed six short films, including a documentary. Andrius Blaževičius worked as an independent filmmaker and, since 2010, as a programme director for the Vilnius International Film Festival in Lithuania.

In 2011, he wrote and directed his last short film, Ten Reasons, in collaboration with producer Marija Razgutė and the production company M-Films. This project won two awards from the Lithuanian Film Academy.

In 2016, Blaževičius directed his first feature film, The Saint. Still accompanied by Marija Razgutė in production (M-Films), the project premiered at the Warsaw International Film Festival and the Busan International Film Festival and won six national awards from Lithuanian Cinema Academy. This film became one of the highest-grossing independent Lithuanian films with 47,000 admissions at the national box office.

Blaževičius wrote and directed his second film, Runner, in 2021. This third collaboration with Marija Razgutė and M-Films premiered at the Karlovy Vary International Film Festival in 2021, and the lead actress, Žygimantė Elena Jakštaitė, received the Shooting Star Award from the European Film Institute. Runner also received two awards from the Lithuanian Film Academy, for Best Actress in a Leading Role and Best Actress in a Supporting Role.

Blaževičius has served as a jury member at various international film festivals, including the Vilnius International Film Festival, FeKK, Sleepwalkers, and ZubrOFFka. He is also a reader at the Lithuanian Film Centre and a member of the selection committee for the Vilnius International Film Festival since 2010.

== Filmography ==
=== Director ===
- 2006: While Andrius Blaževičius Was Young and Inexperienced (short film)
- 2007: The Death of McCaulay Culkin (short film)
- 2008: Vytautas (short film)
- 2009: Bergen (short film)
- 2011: A Story of a Deportee Exiled by her Own Father (documentary short film)
- 2011: Ten Reasons (short film)
- 2016: The Saint (feature film)
- 2021: Runner (feature film)
- 2026: How to Divorce During the War (feature film)

== Accolades ==
Festival and Year	Category	Name of the Movie	Result (Win or Nominated)
Lithuanian Film Awards 2012	Best Short Film	Ten Reasons	Win
Listapad International Film Festival 2016	Grand Jury Prize	The Saint	Win
Listapad International Film Festival 2016	Youth on the March Competition	The Saint	Nominated
Lithuanian Film Awards 2017	Best Director	The Saint	Win
Lithuanian Film Awards 2017	Best Screenplay	The Saint	Nominated
Lithuanian Film Awards 2017	Best Feature Film	The Saint	Nominated
Kiev Molodist International Film Festival 2018	Grand Jury Prize	The Saint	Win
Tallinn Black Nights Film Festival 2021	Best Baltic Film	Runner	Win
Karlovy Vary International Film Festival 2021	Best Fiction Film	Runner	Nominated
Riga International Film Festival 2021	Best Fiction Film	Runner	Win
Crossing Europe 2022	Nomination for Best Fiction Film	Runner	Nominated
Lithuanian Film Awards 2022	Nomination for Best Screenplay	Runner	Nominated
