= Ramin (film) =

2011 film

- Directed by: Audrius Stonys
- Produced by: Uldis Cekulis
- Release date: April 2011 (Switzerland)
- Running time: 58 minutes
- Country: Lithuania
- Language: Georgian

Ramin is a 2011 Lithuanian documentary film directed by Audrius Stonys about the Georgian wrestler Ramin Lomsadze, who once won seven matches in 55 seconds. The film was selected as the Lithuanian entry for the Best Foreign Language Oscar at the 85th Academy Awards, but it did not make the final shortlist.

== See also ==
- List of submissions to the 85th Academy Awards for Best Foreign Language Film
- List of Lithuanian submissions for the Academy Award for Best Foreign Language Film
