= Ashes in the Snow =

- Directed by: Marius A. Markevičius
- Written by: Ben York Jones
- Based on: Between Shades of Gray by Ruta Sepetys
- Produced by: Chris Coen; Marius A. Markevicius; Žilvinas Naujokas; Prithvi Chavan; Ruta Sepetys
- Starring: Bel Powley; Jonah Hauer-King; Martin Wallström; Tom Sweet
- Cinematography: Ramunas Greicius
- Edited by: Jonathan M. Dillon; Veronika Jenet
- Music by: Volker Bertelmann
- Production companies: Sorrento Productions; Tauras Films; Twilight Merengue Studios
- Distributed by: Vertical Entertainment
- Release dates: 21 September 2018 (LAFF); 11 January 2019
- Running time: 98 minutes
- Countries: United States; Lithuania
- Language: English
- Budget: $5,000,000
- Box office: $1,557,172 (Lithuania)

Ashes in the Snow is a 2018 war drama film based on the 2011 best selling novel Between Shades of Gray by Ruta Sepetys. The film is a coming-of-age tale of a young teenager named Lina who, with her mother and younger brother, was deported from her native Lithuania to a Soviet gulag amid Stalin's occupation of the Baltic region during World War II. An aspiring artist, she secretly documents her harrowing journey with her drawings.

Ashes in the Snow stars Aistė Diržiūtė, Bel Powley, Martin Wallström, Lisa Loven Kongsli, Jonah Hauer-King, Peter Franzén and Sophie Cookson. It had its world premiere at the LA Film Festival on 21 September 2018.

== Plot ==
In 1941, sixteen-year old Lina Vilkas is preparing for art school, first dates and the summer holidays in her hometown of Kaunas in Lithuania. However, her father Kostas Vilkas is involved in the Lithuanian resistance against the Soviet occupation of the Baltic states, forging documents to help people escape Lithuania. One night, Lina along with her mother Elena, younger brother Jonas and friend Andrius are rounded up by the NKVD and deported by train to a gulag in the Altaysky region in Siberia.

Lina and her family endure the harsh conditions during the journey. One of their fellow passengers, a young mother named Ona with an infant, is driven to despair by the death of her daughter, causing her to commit suicide by provoking her captors into shooting her. At the gulag, Commander Komarov offers Lina and her fellow prisoners a reduced sentence of 25 years if they sign a confession. Led by Elena, Lina and Jonas refuse to sign the confession and are subjected to harsher treatment. The gulag inmates are forced to grow crops including potatoes in order to meet their quotas.

Amidst the harsh and bleak surroundings, Lina documents her experiences through her art and notes while experiencing flashbacks of her carefree childhood. She also sends messages in her art in an attempt to contact her father's prison camp to let him know his family is still alive. Lina also develops a romantic relationship with Andrius who smuggles supplies to them. Realizing that Elena can speak Russian, Commander Komarov tries to recruit her as a translator but she refuses to collaborate with the enemy. Komarov later orders Lina to draw a portrait of him but she draws a caricature depicting him as a monster. In retaliation, Komarov burns her drawings and messages.

The NKVD guard Nikolai Kretzsky, an ethnic Ukrainian who is looked down upon by his Russian compatriots, becomes infatuated with Elena. After revealing that her husband Kostas was killed by Soviet forces, he attempts to rape her but Elena rebuffs him. Afterward Kretzsky assaults a Russian guard. Komarov "promotes" him to Commander and reassigns him to lead a new gulag on the island Trofimovsky (Russian: остров Трофимовский) in the Laptev Sea. Elena, Lina, and Jonas are reassigned to the Trofimovsky gulag.

Due to the harsh polar conditions and insufficient rations, Elena dies of ill health. Their mother's death compels Lina to demand better rations and warm clothing for the prisoners. To honor Elena's memory, a guilt-ridden Kretzsky grants Lina and Jonas an amnesty before committing suicide. The film ends with the two siblings walking on the beach towards their ship.

== Cast ==
- Bel Powley as Lina Vilkas
- Jonah Hauer-King as Andrius
- Lisa Loven Kongsli as Elena Vilkas
- Sophie Cookson as Ona
- Martin Wallström as Nikolai Kretzsky
- Peter Franzén as Commander Komarov
- Sam Hazeldine as Kostas Vilkas
- James Cosmo as Mr. Stalas
- Tom Sweet as Jonas Vilkas
- Adrian Schiller as The Man Who Winds His Watch
- Timothy Innes as Nojus
- Aistė Diržiūtė as Joana
- Greg Kolpakchi as Greshnev
- Nadja Bobyleva as Marija
- Sarah Finigan

== Production ==
=== Casting ===
On 19 May 2015, it was announced that Bel Powley was attached to play the lead role of Lina Vilkas. On 3 November 2015, Jonah Hauer-King was added to the cast. On 3 February 2016, it was announced that Martin Wallström had been cast as the movie's male lead, playing a Soviet officer taunted for being Ukrainian, who befriends the young girl and her mother. Norwegian actress Lisa Loven Kongsli was cast as Lina's mother Elena Vilkas, James Cosmo as Mr. Stalas, and Peter Franzén as General Komarov.

Four Lithuanian actors were cast: Aistė Diržiūtė, Gabija Jaraminaitė, Darius Meškauskas, and Ramūnas Cicėnas.

=== Filming ===
In late January 2016, filming began in Nida, Lithuania. Filming in Vilnius began in April 2016 and moved to Kaunas in May.

== Music ==
On 13 September 2018, an official song for the movie was released. It was announced that a cover of the Bob Dylan song "Ring Them Bells", performed by Lithuanian singer Gjan, would appear in the end titles of "Ashes in the Snow". The music video for the song was directed by Marius Markevicius and features scenes from the movie.

== Release ==
The film had its world premiere at the LA Film Festival on 21 September 2018. Vertical Entertainment distributed the film in the United States.

== Reception ==
On review aggregator website Rotten Tomatoes, the film received a 53% approval rating, based on 15 reviews with an average rating of 5.1/10. It also holds a weighted average rating of 42 out of 100 on Metacritic, based on 7 critics, indicating "mixed or average" reviews.

Ben Kenigsberg of The New York Times said that the movie has "a few powerful images", while Cath Clarke of The Guardian called the movie "soapy". Stephen Farber of The Hollywood Reporter, called the movie a "[g]rim chronicle of a historical tragedy".

Rex Reed of The Observer called the movie "[a]nother dreary Holocaust drama with no regard for narrative trajectory and an overwhelming lack of verbal coherence." The Holocaust however, "was the genocide of European Jews during World War II ... (by) Nazi Germany and its collaborators", whereas the Soviet Union was Germany's enemy, and the Lithuanians taken prisoner were not necessarily Jewish.
