= Mariupolis =

2016 Ukrainian-Lithuanian documentary

- Theatrical release poster
- Directed by: Mantas Kvedaravičius
- Written by: Mantas Kvedaravičius
- Produced by: Julie Gayet, Thanassis Karathanos, Nadia Turincev, Uljana Kim, Mantas Kvedaravičius, Anna Palenchuk
- Cinematography: Vadym Ilkov, Mantas Kvedaravičius, Vyacheslav Tsvetkov
- Edited by: Dounia Sichov
- Production companies: Studio Uljana Kim, Extimacy Films, Twenty Twenty Vision, 435 Films, Rouge International
- Release dates: 14 February 2016 (World Premiere); 8 April 2016 (Lithuania)
- Running time: 96 minutes
- Countries: Lithuania, Germany, France, Ukraine
- Language: Russian

Mariupolis (Ukrainian: Маріуполіс) is a 2016 feature-length documentary by Lithuanian director Mantas Kvedaravičius. The film was shot in the autumn of 2015 in Mariupol and aimed to portray what has been described as "the testimonies of Ukrainians, captured on film and mobile phone cameras, and[...]images of despair and anxiety, destroyed settlements and lives that prove that the war has been going on since 2014."

In lieu of focusing upon combat, the film has been noted to place an emphasis on civilians and their daily lives. Instances of regular workers, performers, fishers, and children have been observed to be the primary focus of the film. The film subsequently received critical acclaim and won several awards, premiering at the 66th Berlin International Film Festival and accruing awards such as Best Documentary at the Lithuanian Film Awards (Silver Crane) and Best Film at the Vilnius International Film Festival. Following the director's death in the 2022 Siege of Mariupol, however, the film has since also become a salient document of pre-2022 life in Mariupol.

== Synopsis ==
Described by the Visions du Réel Film Festival as "A collective fresco on the fringes of war: the town of Marioupol in Ukraine is resisting through weapons and its ferocious will to live," the film presents itself as a series showcasing the minutiae of civilian day-to-day lives in the besieged city of Mariupol. Scenes in the film included multiple plot lines, such as a shoemaker repairing shoes in his workshop, a daughter interviewing an elderly villager, a set of colliding trams, and factory workers at a violin recital.

Much of the film, however, also centers around the emptiness of Mariupol. Writing for ScreenDaily, David D'Arcy notes that "In the style of an essay film that touches and skirts themes of siege, abandonment and mute denial, the camera makes its way through neglected public spaces in a city which seems to have lost much of its population."

Maintaining this theme, critics have also noted that while "occasional explosions are heard, life nevertheless goes on, with celebrations and weddings[...]the film concentrates not on the political but on the delicacy of the life of Mariupolites."

Unlike other documentaries, the film notably lacked a constant musical score and traditional voiceover, creating what has been observed as a "sound vacuum."

== Production ==
=== Development and Conception ===
Not originally intended to be a standalone documentary, Kvedaravičius had originally traveled to Odesa and Mariupol to develop a script for a different feature film. During his travels, Kvedaravičius became intrigued by the atmosphere present in Mariupol, ultimately shifting his focus to capturing the city's daily routines before it was permanently altered.

=== Filming ===
Wary of the threat that Russia posed to the city, the film crew spent two weeks preparing for shooting. Subsequently, they shot for one month until May 9 when the city was rumored to be attacked, noted also as the day for traditional Ukrainian Victory Day festivities. This rumor proved false and multiple reshoots occurred in the following weeks. Despite this, most of the footage was filmed in that month.

=== Post-production ===
The film was largely edited by Dounia Sichov in Paris and Vilnius and focused on a non-linear structure for the film, aiming to reflect life in Mariupol, where the threat of war is constant and life is unpredictable. The sound design, headed by Artūras Pugačiauskas, omitted a traditional musical score purposefully in an effort to rely on ambient city sounds.

The film was also a multi-national co-production involving Studio Uljana Kim (Lithuania), Twenty Twenty Vision (Germany), Rouge International (France), and 435 Films (Ukraine) and receiving support from the Lithuanian Film Centre (LFC) and Eurimages.

== Release ==
The world premiere of Mariupolis was held at the 66th Berlin International Film Festival on February 14, 2016, where it was screened as part of the Panorama Dokumente section. Following this premiere, the film continued to be screened in various film festivals throughout 2016, including at the Hong Kong International Film Festival, Visions du Réel, DocuDays UA, Stockholm International Film Festival, Vilnius International Film Festival, and Artdocfest.

The film received a theatrical release in Lithuania on April 8, 2016.

== Critical reception ==
Critical reception of Mariupolis has remained generally positive, with critics praising its observational style and anthropological perspective. Writing for the East European Film Bulletin, Moritz Pfeifer notes that "By refusing to frame the members of civil society as victims in the need of some bigger ideology – unity, freedom or whatever –, Kvedaravičius recognizes the loss of their dignity as their essential threat."

Similarly, film critic Laurence Boyce has praised the film's ability to highlight how "Even on the front line of war, domesticity shines through," subsequently declaring that the film's ability to provoke thought within its audiences would make it a surefire success.

In contrast to this praise, however, some critics have pointed out that the raw imagery appears "amateur in its execution" and "overtly scripted," questioning the authenticity of the interactions. Film critic James Ager observes that "Whether it’s the heavy-handed juxtaposition of the civilians and the military, or the rough-round-the-edges film quality, it’s difficult to miss indicators that this director has yet to master the nuances of his craft."

== Awards and nominations ==
| Year | Award/Organization | Category | Nominee | Result |
|---|---|---|---|---|
| 2016 | Berlin International Film Festival | Amnesty International Film Prize | Mantas Kvedaravičius | Nominated |
| 2016 | Lithuanian Film Awards (Silver Crane) | Best Documentary | Mantas Kvedaravičius | Won |
| 2016 | Lithuanian Film Awards (Silver Crane) | Best Art Direction | Yuriy Grigorovich | Won |
| 2016 | Lithuanian Film Awards (Silver Crane) | Best Cinematography | Mantas Kvedaravičius, Vadym Ilkov, Viacheslav Poliantsev | Nominated |
| 2016 | Vilnius International Film Festival | Best Director (Baltic Gaze) | Mantas Kvedaravičius | Won |
| 2016 | Hong Kong International Film Festival | Golden Firebird Award | Mariupolis | Nominated |
| 2016 | Stockholm International Film Festival | Bronze Horse (Best Documentary) | Mariupolis | Nominated |

== Legacy ==
Originally produced as an anthropological documentation of what Kvedaravičius noted as "life next to war, life lived in spite of war," the significance of the film has since shifted following the 2022 Russian Invasion of Ukraine and Siege of Mariupol. Notable landmarks in Mariupol featured in the film − such as the Azovstal Iron and Steel Works – have since been destroyed.

The film's legacy has also been tied to the murder of director Mantas Kvedaravičius, who was captured and killed by Russian forces in Mariupol whilst filming the sequel to Mariupolis – Mariupolis 2 – in April 2022. Mariupolis 2 was later released posthumously and shown at the Cannes Film Festival. The death of director Kvedaravičius subsequently prompted numerous renewed international screenings at festivals and museums.
