= The Summer of Sangailė =

2015 film

- Film poster
- Directed by: Alantė Kavaitė
- Written by: Alantė Kavaitė
- Produced by: Živilė Gallego; Antoine Simkine
- Starring: Julija Steponaityte; Aistė Diržiūtė; Jūratė Sodytė; Martynas Budraitis; Laurynas Jurgelis; Nele Savicenko; Inga Salkauskaite
- Cinematography: Dominique Colin
- Edited by: Joëlle Hache
- Music by: Jean-Benoît Dunckel
- Distributed by: Fralita Films; Les Films d'Antoine; Viking Film
- Release dates: 22 January 2015 (Sundance); 29 July 2015 (France); 21 August 2015 (Lithuania)
- Running time: 88 minutes
- Countries: Lithuania; France; Netherlands
- Language: Lithuanian

The Summer of Sangailė (Lithuanian: Sangailės vasara) is a 2015 romantic teen drama film written and directed by Alantė Kavaitė. It was screened in the Panorama section of the 65th Berlin International Film Festival. The film won the directing award in the dramatic world cinema category at the 2015 Sundance Film Festival. It also won Best Film, Best Actress (Julija Steponaitytė) and best set design (Ramunas Rastauskas) at the Silver Crane Awards. The film was selected as the Lithuanian entry for the Best Foreign Language Film at the 88th Academy Awards but it was not nominated.

== Plot ==
Sangailė is a simple girl who dreams of becoming a stunt pilot but her lack of self-confidence and vertigo are preventing her from getting into a cockpit. Sangailė meets another teenage girl, Austė, at an air show. As the two girls spend more time together Austė finds ways to get alone time with Sangailė. Throughout the film Sangailė is shown cutting herself in her bathroom. Austė uses photography and fashion to highlight Sangaile's inner and outer beauty. The two girls become romantically involved and they enjoy their summer days together revealing their passions and secrets. Austė tries to help Sangailė stop cutting herself by becoming her support system and listening to her. There are scenes between Sangailė and her parents that show a strained relationship between her and her mother. Eventually Austė convinces Sangailė to go on a stunt plane ride but Sangailė's vertigo kicks in causing her to feel sick and blame Austė. Sangailė eventually apologizes to Austė for yelling and ignoring her. With the support of Austė, Sangailė decides to train herself to get over her vertigo so she can ride in a plane again. The film ends with two years having passed since Austė and Sangailė last saw each other and both are living their dreams. Austė got into fashion school and Sangailė is flying planes for the air show.

== Filming locations ==
It was filmed in Lithuania, primarily in Vilnius, Elektrenai and Kyviškės.

== Cast ==
- Julija Steponaityte as Sangailė
- Aistė Diržiūtė as Austė
- Jūratė Sodytė as Sangailė's mother
- Martynas Budraitis as Sangailė's father

== See also ==
- List of LGBT films directed by women
- List of lesbian, gay, bisexual or transgender-related films of 2015
- List of submissions to the 88th Academy Awards for Best Foreign Language Film
- List of Lithuanian submissions for the Academy Award for Best Foreign Language Film
