= Dog's Life (film) =

2013 Lithuanian dramatic film

- Šuns dienos
- Directed by: Ieva Veiverytė
- Written by: Ieva Veiverytė; Teklė Kavtaradzė
- Starring: Vesta Grabštaitė; Laimutė Štrimaitytė
- Cinematography: Narvydas Naujalis
- Production company: M-Films
- Release date: June 2013
- Running time: 24 minutes
- Country: Lithuania
- Language: Lithuanian

Dog's Life (Lithuanian: Šuns dienos) is a Lithuanian drama film written and directed by Ieva Veiverytė and released in 2013.

== Plot ==
Dalia is fifty, she lives in a large detached house of Soviet architecture together with her retired mum. Dalia's daughter studies in another town and Dalia relies on her advice and support in every situation. Unexpectedly the retired mum is sent to the hospital for tests and Dalia is stays alone at home. A random idea to release their guard dog for a free run around ends up in disaster – the dog is run over by a car. A dog burial issue becomes a real challenge for a woman, who has never experienced self-sufficiency.

== Cast ==
- Vesta Grabštaitė as Dalia
- Laimutė Štrimaitytė as Mother
- Gintaras Liutkevičius as Neighbor
- Marius Drakšas as Mindaugas
- Goncar Zana as Nurse
- Joana Danutė Keturakytė as Room Neighbor (hospital)
- Giedrius Arbačiauskas as Voice

== Production ==
Dog's Life is the second short film by Ieva Veiverytė and the first collaboration of the director with producer Marija Razgutė (M-Films). The film's international premiere took place in Finland on March 5, 2014, at the Tampere Film Festival. Dog's Life is the first Lithuanian film to be selected for this festival in the last four years.

In 2020, the Lithuanian short film agency Shorts ranked Dog's Life among the top eight Lithuanian short films made in the 2010s.

== Nominations and awards ==
- Scanorama European Film Forum 2013: Nomination in the New Baltic Cinema program
- Lithuanian Film Academy Silver Crane Awards 2014: Best Actress Award in a Leading Role and Nomination for Best Short Film
- Tampere International Film Festival 2014: Selection in the International Competition program
- Leeds International Short Film Festival 2014: Selection in the Lithuanian program
- Clermont-Ferrand International Short Film Festival 2014: Selection in the International Competition
