= It's a Dog's Life =

It's a Dog's Life may refer to:

- It's a Dog's Life (film), a 1955 American film
- "It's a Dog's Life" (Lucky Feller), a 1976 television episode
- "It's a Dog's Life" (Murder, She Wrote), a 1984 television episode
- "It's a Dog's Life" (The Ren & Stimpy Show), a 1994 television episode
- It's a Dog's Life, a 1984 Hank the Cowdog children's book by John R. Erickson
- It's a Dog's Life, a video game developed by Sanctuary Woods
- "It's a Dog's Life", a song by Celica Gray, closing theme of the TV series 101 Dalmatian Street
- It's a Dog's Life with Bill Farmer, a 2020 Disney+ documentary series featuring Bill Farmer

== See also ==
- "It's a Dog's Life and I Love It", a song from the 1991 animated film Rover Dangerfield
- Dog's Life (disambiguation)
