= Golden Goblet Award for Best Documentary Film =

Chinese film award

The Golden Goblet Award for Best Documentary Film (Chinese: 金爵奖最佳纪录片) is a highest prize awarded to films in the documentary category of competition at the Shanghai International Film Festival.

== Award winners ==
Year	Film	Country
2015	The Verse of Us	(China) Wu Feiyue/Qin Xiaoyu
2016	When Two Worlds Collide	(Peru) Heidi Brandenburg/Mathew Orzel
2017	When Paul Come Over the Sea - Journal of an Encounter	(Germany) Jakob Preuss
2018	The Long Season	(Netherlands) Leonard Retel Helmrich
2019	Bridges of Time	(Latvia) (Lithuania) (Estonia)
2023	Anxious in Beirut	(Lebanon) (Jordan) (Qatar) (Spain) Zakaria Jaber (Dir) / Jumana Saadeh (Prod)
