= The Saint (2016 film) =

2016 Lithuanian drama film

- Lithuanian: Šventasis
- Directed by: Andrius Blaževičius
- Written by: Andrius Blaževičius: Teklė Kavtaradzė; Marija Kavtaradzė
- Produced by: Marija Razgutė: Marta Lewandowska
- Starring: Marius Repšys: Indrė Patkauskaitė; Gelminė Glemžaitė
- Cinematography: Linas Dabriška
- Edited by: Silvija Vilkaitė
- Music by: Vytautas Rasimavičius
- Release date: 2016
- Running time: 96 minutes
- Country: Lithuania
- Language: Lithuanian

The Saint (Lithuanian: Šventasis) is a Lithuanian film written and directed by Andrius Blaževičius and released in 2016.

It is a social drama exploring themes of social pressure, vulnerability, masculinism, the role of religion in our society, and the fragility of post-Soviet countries in the late 2010s.

== Plot ==
Lithuanian provincial town is facing Great Recession in 2008. Vytas, portrayed by Marius Repšys, gets fired from his job at a factory. Pushed by his wife, he immediately starts looking for a new job, but not successfully. After having his haircut done, Vytas starts looking for a new love affair with a hairdresser Marija, played by Gelminė Glemžaitė. This is not successful either. Finally, Vytas gets involved in a third search – he starts looking for a guy who posted a video on YouTube, claiming he saw Jesus Christ in their town. This is the only time he succeeds.

== Cast ==
- Marius Repšys as Vytas
- Indrė Patkauskaitė as Juratė
- Gelminė Glemžaitė as Marija
- Valentinas Krulikovskis as Petras
- Lukas Malinauskas as The Saint
- Artūras Aleksejevas as Edgaras
- Eglė Ancevičiūtė as Partygoer
- Jonas Braškys as Rokas
- Erikas Brazauskas as Kindergarten boy
- Remigijus Bučius as Neighbor
- Karolis Butvydas as Partygoer
- Vladimir Dorondov as Consultant
- Martyna Gedvilaitė as Pop group 'Illusion'
- Karolina Gričiūtė as Aušra
- Aurelija Jogaudaitė as Partygoer
- Junė Juknelytė as Dovilė's girl
- Jelena Juščenko-Kirejeva as Secretary
- Jurijus Karanas as Marija's father
- Elija Kavaliauskaitė as Girl with umbrella
- Urtė Kavaliauskaitė as Indrė's girl
- Dangiras Masionis as Sacristan
- Darius Meškauskas as Employer
- Ignas Misiūra as Man in suit
- Sandra Navickaitė as Pop group 'Illusion'
- Marius Pocevičius as Partygoer
- Tomas Pukys as Partygoer
- Agnieška Ravdo as Algina
- Ilona Rėkuvienė as Marija's mother
- Dovilė Šilkaitytė as Gražina
- Audrius Tamulionis as Elderly man
- Justas Tertelis as Partygoer
- Liubov Timochova as Petras' mother

== Production ==
This is the first feature film of Andrius Blaževičius. After producing his graduation short film Ten reasons (2011), Lithuanian producer Marija Razgutė (M-Films) signed a second collaboration with the director for his first feature film The Saint, originally titled Crisis.

The film had one of the best openings at the Lithuanian box office in 2017. It remained in the number one spot for its second week in Lithuania and exceeded 66,000 admissions in its first week of release, accounting for nearly a quarter of all entries for the week.

== Reception ==
The film received generally positive reviews from critics. It garnered over 70% positive reviews, with an average score of 3.4/5 based on 154 collected reviews on the website Letterboxd.

== Accolades ==
Award	Date of ceremony	Category	Recipients	Result
47th International Kiev Molodist Film Festival (Belarus) 2018	2018	Grand Prix	Andrius Blaževičius	Won
International Vilnius Film Festival (Kino pavasari)	2017	Best Actor	Marius Repšys	Won
National Lithuanian Film Cinema Award "Silver Crane"	2017	Best Feature Film	Andrius Blaževičius	Won
National Lithuanian Film Cinema Award "Silver Crane"	2017	Best Director	Andrius Blaževičius	Won
National Lithuanian Film Cinema Award "Silver Crane"	2017	Best Screenplay	Andrius Blaževičius, Marija Kavtaradzė, Teklė Kavtaradzė	Won
National Lithuanian Film Cinema Award "Silver Crane"	2017	Best Actor	Marius Repšys	Won
National Lithuanian Film Cinema Award "Silver Crane"	2017	Best Supporting Actress	Gelminė Glemžaitė	Won
National Lithuanian Film Cinema Award "Silver Crane"	2017	Best Supporting Actor	Valentinas Krulikovskis	Won
National Lithuanian Film Cinema Award "Silver Crane"	2017	Best Individual Achievement	Producer Marija Razgutė	Selected
National Lithuanian Film Cinema Award "Silver Crane"	2017	Best Cinematography	Linas Dabriška	Selected
National Lithuanian Film Cinema Award "Silver Crane"	2017	Best Actress	Indrė Patkauskaitė	Selected
National Lithuanian Film Cinema Award "Silver Crane"	2017	Best Editing	Silvija Vilkaitė	Selected
National Lithuanian Film Cinema Award "Silver Crane"	2017	Best Art Direction	Aurimas Akšys	Selected
Lübeck Nordic Film Days Festival (Germany)	2017	Selected	Andrius Blaževičius	Selected
Crossing Europe Festival (Austria)	2017	Selected	Andrius Blaževičius	Selected
Trieste International Film Festival (Italy)	2017	Selected	Andrius Blaževičius	Selected
Brisbane International Film Festival (Australia)	2017	Selected	Andrius Blaževičius	Selected
23rd International Minsk Film Festival, Listapad (Belarus)	2016	Special Jury Mention	Andrius Blaževičius	Selected
Warsaw International Film Festival (Poland)	2016	Selected	Andrius Blaževičius	Selected
Busan International Film Festival (South Korea)	2016	Selected	Andrius Blaževičius	Selected
