= Ten Reasons =

2011 Lithuanian drama short

- Lithuanian: Desimt priezasciu
- Directed by: Andrius Blaževičius
- Written by: Andrius Blaževičius: Teklė Kavtaradzė
- Produced by: Marija Razgutė: Marta Lewandowska
- Starring: Marius Repšys: Gelminė Glemžaitė; Arvydas Dapšys
- Cinematography: Linas Dabriska
- Edited by: Andrius Blaževičius Ieva Veiverytė
- Music by: Domas Strupinskas
- Production company: M-Films
- Release date: 2011
- Running time: 29 minutes
- Country: Lithuania
- Language: Lithuanian

Ten Reasons (Lithuanian: Desimt priezasciu) is a Lithuanian film written and directed by Andrius Blaževičius and released in 2011.

The film addresses the theme of Lithuanian youth in the 2000s, social alienation, and identity issues after Lithuania's independence in 1991.

== Plot ==
Vytas, portrayed by Marius Repšys, is a resident of a blocked houses quarter and he is just as dull as his neighborhood. Though the young guy is over his twenties, he still lives with his parents – spending their days watching TV.

Vytas’ girlfriend Ona, portrayed by Gelminė Glemžaitė, is a bit different – she is independent, knows her likes and dislikes, has some friends – one of which she starts seeing more and more often. This leaves no sunshine in Vytas life at all and makes him wander for the truth in the maze of the blocked houses quarter.

== Cast ==
- Marius Repšys as Vytas
- Gelminė Glemžaitė as Ona
- Arvydas Dapšys as Vytas' father
- Nele Savicenko as Vytas' mother

== Production ==
Ten Reasons is the sixth film by Andrius Blaževičius, the first of three cinematic collaborations between the director and producer Marija Razgutė (M-Films Productions).

The film portrays the daily life and reality of Lithuania after its liberation in 1991, as seen through the eyes of a protagonist who feels alienated in this new life. The director emphasizes human relationships, alienation, and jealousy influenced by the world of entertainment and technology.

The song "Ten Reasons" by the Lithuanian group 69 Dangujue is featured in this short film.

== Awards and recognition ==
Award	Date of ceremony	Category	Recipients	Result
Scanorama 2011 European Cinema Forum	2011	Best Short Film	Andrius Blaževičius	Won
TEO LT 2011 Grant	2011	Best Short Film	Andrius Blaževičius	Won
Lithuanian Cinema Awards 2012	2012	Best Short Film	Andrius Blaževičius	Won
Lithuanian Cinema Awards 2012	2012	Best Actor	Andrius Blaževičius	Won
Lithuanian Cinema Awards 2012	2012	Nomination for Best Project of the Year	Andrius Blaževičius	Nominated
