= Mantas Kvedaravičius =

Lithuanian filmmaker and academic (1976–2022)

- Kvedaravičius in 2016
- Born: 23 June 1976; Biržai, Lithuanian SSR, USSR (now Lithuania)
- Died: 30 March 2022 (aged 45); Mariupol, Ukraine
- Occupations: Filmmaker, anthropologist, and archaeologist
- Partner: Hanna Bilobrava
- Children: 2

Mantas Kvedaravičius (23 June 1976 – 30 March 2022) was a Lithuanian filmmaker, anthropologist, and archaeologist known for war reporting in hostile areas. He was killed during the Siege of Mariupol.

== Life and career ==
Kvedaravičius held a PhD in social anthropology from the University of Cambridge, and was an associate professor at Vilnius University. His doctoral thesis was titled "Knots of absence: death, dreams, and disappearances at the limits of law in the counter-terrorism zone of Chechnya" (Cambridge University, 2012). War-torn Chechnya, one of the republics of the Russian Federation, is also the setting of his 2011 documentary film, Barzakh ("Limbo").

His next documentary film, in 2016, focused on the Ukrainian port city of Mariupol in 2014–15 and attacks on it by separatist troops. In 2019, Kvedaravičius's first feature film was released, entitled Partenonas (Parthenon), and set in Athens, Odesa, and Istanbul. Based on several years of ethnographic research, it explores the enigmatic workings of memory. In arresting, often disconnected images, the pivotal character revives various lives he may have lived: "Memories betray him, but he knows for sure that in one of these lives, he will be killed."

== Death ==
Working on yet another Mariupol documentary, Kvedaravičius was killed on 30 March 2022 during the Siege of Mariupol. Lyudmyla Denisova, Ukraine's ombudsperson for human rights, alleged that he "was taken prisoner by 'rashists', who later shot him. The occupiers threw the director's body out into the street". Kvedaravičius's fiancée, Hanna Bilobrova, reported that a Russian soldier led her to his body two days after his death. She said that he had been shot in the stomach, but there was "no blood on the ground" and no bullet hole in the clothes he was wearing. Bilobrova brought his body home to Lithuania.

Kvedaravičius' killing was condemned by Audrey Azoulay, director general of Unesco, in a press release published on 6 April 2022. According to global monitoring on the safety of journalists by the Unesco Observatory of Killed Journalists, Kvedaravičius was the ninth media professional killed by Russian forces in Ukraine in 2022.

== Filmography ==
=== Documentaries ===
- Barzakh (2011)
- Mariupolis (2016)
- Mariupolis 2 (2022)

=== Feature film ===
- Parthenon (Partenonas) (2019)
- Prologos (2021)

== Awards ==
- 2022: Lithuanian National Prize for Culture and Arts
- Barzakh

Amnesty International Film Prize, 2011 Berlin International Film Festival
Best Film, 2011 Belgrade Documentary and Short Film Festival
Best Documentary, 2011 Lithuanian Film Awards
Amnesty International Film Prize, 2012 Ljubljana International Film Festival
Grand Prize, 2011 Tallinn Black Nights Film Festival
Best Lithuanian Debut, 2011 Vilnius International Film Festival

- Mariupolis

Best Documentary, 2016 Lithuanian Film Awards
Best Director, 2016 Vilnius International Film Festival

- Mariupolis 2

European Documentary, 2022 European Film Awards
