= Back to Your Arms =

2010 film

- Lithuanian poster
- Directed by: Kristijonas Vildžiūnas
- Written by: Kristijonas Vildžiūnas
- Produced by: Uljana Kim
- Starring: Giedrius Arbaciauskas
- Cinematography: Vladas Naudzius
- Release date: 26 November 2010
- Running time: 90 minutes
- Country: Lithuania
- Language: Lithuanian

Back to Your Arms (Lithuanian: Kai apkabinsiu tave) is a 2010 Lithuanian drama film directed by Kristijonas Vildžiūnas. The film was selected as the Lithuanian entry for the Best Foreign Language Film at the 84th Academy Awards, but it did not make the final shortlist.

== Cast ==
- Giedrius Arbačiauskas
- Andrius Bialobžeskis as Vladas
- Margarita Broich as Bettina
- Franz Broich-Wuttke
- Jurga Jutaitė as Auksė
- Aleksas Kazanavičius
- Elžbieta Latėnaitė as Rūta
- Sandra Maren Schneider as Renate
- Sabin Tambrea

== See also ==
- List of submissions to the 84th Academy Awards for Best Foreign Language Film
- List of Lithuanian submissions for the Academy Award for Best International Feature Film
