= Vortex (2009 film) =

- Directed by: Gytis Lukšas
- Based on: Duburys, novel by Romualdas Granauskas
- Release date: 2009
- Running time: 140 minutes
- Country: Lithuania

Vortex is a 2009 Lithuanian drama film, directed by Gytis Lukšas, a known Lithuanian film director. It is an adaptation of the novel Duburys by Lithuanian writer Romualdas Granauskas. Granauskas is a winner of Lithuanian National Prize. One review called the film "rather boring".
