= The Gambler (2013 film) =

2013 film

- Film poster
- Directed by: Ignas Jonynas
- Written by: Kristupas Sabolius; Ignas Jonynas
- Starring: Vytautas Kaniušonis
- Release dates: 25 September 2013 (San Sebastián); 22 March 2014 (Lithuania)
- Running time: 109 minutes
- Country: Lithuania
- Language: Lithuanian

The Gambler (Lithuanian: Lošėjas) is a 2013 Lithuanian drama film directed by Ignas Jonynas. An ambulance driver is addicted to gambling. It was selected as the Lithuanian entry for the Best Foreign Language Film at the 87th Academy Awards, but was not nominated.

== Cast ==
- Vytautas Kaniušonis as Vincentas
- Oona Mekas as Ieva

== See also ==
- List of submissions to the 87th Academy Awards for Best Foreign Language Film
- List of Lithuanian submissions for the Academy Award for Best Foreign Language Film
