= The Visitor (2024 film) =

2024 United Kingdom film

- Teaser poster
- Directed by: Bruce LaBruce
- Screenplay by: Bruce LaBruce; Alex Babboni; Victor Fraga
- Based on: Teorema by Pier Paolo Pasolini
- Produced by: Alex Babboni; Victor Fraga
- Starring: Bishop Black; Macklin Kowal; Amy Kingsmill
- Cinematography: Jack Hamilton
- Edited by: Judy Landkammer
- Music by: Hannah Holland
- Production company: A/POLITICAL
- Distributed by: Best Friend Forever
- Release date: 17 February 2024 (Berlinale)
- Running time: 101 minutes
- Country: United Kingdom
- Language: English
- Box office: $16,362

The Visitor is a 2024 British film directed by Bruce LaBruce. The film, starring burlesque actor Bishop Black in the titular role, is a new interpretation of Pier Paolo Pasolini's 1968 allegorical film Teorema, depicted in explicit sex scenes.

It was selected in the Panorama section at the 74th Berlin International Film Festival where it was screened on 17 February 2024.

== Plot ==
The Visitor is a British-set reimagining of Pier Paolo Pasolini's 1968 film Teorema. Pasolini's enigmatic protagonist, known to everyone as "the visitor", arrives at the house of an upper-class family and seduces each family member one after the other. When he suddenly departs, he leaves behind an emptiness for which the rest attempt to compensate in different ways. In Bruce LaBruce's The Visitor, it is a refugee who washes up in a small suitcase on the banks of the River Thames in London. He is one of several identical-looking men who simultaneously emerge from suitcases in other locations around the city. Dressed in the guise of a homeless man, he arrives at the house of an upper-class family and gets to know the maid. When she passes him off as her nephew, the family invites him to also work for them as a live-in servant. The guest makes love with each of the residents of the house one after the other, depicted in explicit sex scenes. Each member of the household experiences a radical sexual and spiritual transformation.

== Cast ==
- Bishop Black as The Visitor
- Macklin Kowal as The Father
- Amy Kingsmill as The Mother
- Ray Filar as The Daughter
- Kurtis Lincoln as The Son
- Luca Federici as The Maid
- John Foley as Homeless Man

== Production ==
The film is produced by A/POLITICAL.

== Release ==
The Visitor had its world premiere on 17 February 2024, as part of the 74th Berlin International Film Festival, in Panorama.

In January 2024, Brussels-based Best Friend Forever acquired the sales rights of the film.

== Reception ==
On the review aggregator website Rotten Tomatoes, 94% of 17 critics' reviews are positive. Metacritic, which uses a weighted average, assigned the film a score of 83 out of 100, based on 4 critics, indicating "universal acclaim".

Catherine Bray writing in Variety said, "Jack Hamilton’s camera stays close to the squelchy action throughout, to the extent that you may find yourself wondering whether there was a line in the budget for tissues and lens cleaner, or perhaps some sort of splatter guard." Serena Seghedoni reviewing at Berlinale for Loud And Clear Reviews awarded 3.5 stars and wrote, "It’s a revolutionary movie, in the sense that it subverts what we’re used to seeing in film, in more than one way."

Muriel Del Don reviewing the film at Berlinale for Cineuropa wrote, "Transgressive and proud of it, Bruce LaBruce shows us, with his latest powerful film, that he has lost none of his subversive energy."

David Opie of IndieWire, reviewing at Berlinale, graded the film A and wrote, "Brilliantly depraved... It’s hard to imagine anyone better suited to sticking two middle fingers up at contemporary Britain than LaBruce, and it’s even harder to imagine anyone else doing so with such disruptive, subversive glee."

== Accolades ==
Award	Date	Category	Recipient	Result	Ref.
Berlin International Film Festival	25 February 2024	Panorama Audience Award for Best Feature Film	The Visitor	Nominated	
Berlin International Film Festival	25 February 2024	Teddy Award for Best Feature Film	The Visitor	Nominated	

== See also ==
- List of LGBT-related films of 2024
