= Vilnius International Film Festival =

Film festival in Vilnius, Lithuania

- Location: Vilnius, Lithuania
- Founded: 1995
- Language: Lithuanian & English
- Website: kinopavasaris.lt

The Vilnius International Film Festival (VIFF) Kino pavasaris is a film festival held annually in March in Vilnius, Lithuania since 1995, and is the largest film festival in the nation in number of films and audience. It is one of the most anticipated annual cultural events in Lithuania.

Vilnius International Film Festival Kino Pavasaris is the biggest and most important cinema event in Lithuania. Over 30 years, the festival has become a highly attended cultural phenomenon. In 2017, it attracted 114 250 members of audience in 5 Lithuanian cities. In 2025, Vilnius IFF will take place in 14 cities over two weeks.

The festival's main venue is Forum Cinemas Vingis, with additional screenings taking place at the local art film theatre SKALVIJA, cinema boutique "Pasaka" and at the shopping mall "Akropolis" at "Forum Cinemas Akropolis". Some screenings are shown in the second largest city of Lithuania - Kaunas at local "Forum Cinemas" centre. And from 2018 Vilnius IFF took place in 11 cities over two weeks.

== History ==
The festival was founded in 1995 at the cinema Lietuva. Festival director Vida Ramaškienė.

After the 2002 festival the venue Lietuva was sold to private investors. As a result, the festival did not happen in 2003.

In 2004 the festival got the first donation from the European Commission. Festival's programme becomes more independent and Edvinas Pukšta with Jurga Stakėnaitė started making festival's film programme.

In 2006 the festival changed its location to Forum Cinemas Vingis in Naujamiestis.

In 2018, Vilnius IFF presented 112 feature and 56 short films, including 12 Lithuanian premieres. Like always, the festival has selected strong debuts and works from masters of film. The large programme has been divided into 5 categories: Discoveries, Festivals' Favourites, Masters, Critics' Choice, and Competition of European Debuts.

In 2025, the Vilnius International Film Festival celebrated its 30th anniversary, screening over 100 films and hosting more than 50 events across Lithuania. The festival attracted nearly 130,000 attendees. To mark the occasion, the winners received a special anniversary edition of the Vilnius International Film Festival statuette.

== Programmes ==
Since 2009, the festival's competition programmes have become our phenomenal calling card for international film industry professionals, and a great educational tool for festivalgoers. This year, films from debuting European directors will take part in the Competition of European Debuts.

Vilnius International Film Festival is organised in various sections:

Competition programmes:

- New Europe – New Names (since 2009), the films are assessed by an international jury of cinema industry professionals: actors, directors, programme directors, cinematographers and producers. The jury selects the best film of the festival and awards it two special prizes.
- Baltic Gaze (since 2014), the idea of this competition programme is to satisfy growing interest of Baltic region cinematography. The films are assessed by the international jury of the cinema industry professionals. The jury will select the best film of this programme and award it with solid monetary prize.

Other programmes:

- Short films. Competition
- Discoveries
- Festivals' favourites
- Masters
- Critics' choice
- VIASAT comedies
- Documentaries
- Retrospective, each year a different director or/and a topic is selected.
- American Independents
- A Letter to Ukraine
- Culinary films
- Films for Family
- Lithuanian films – premiers
- Lithuanian films
- Lithuanians Abroad
- Short films

2018 Vilnius IFF will also be the first Lithuanian festival to welcome members of the prestigious FIPRESCI association, who will award one director from the Baltic region their prize. The FIPRESCI Prize is significant proof of the festival's quality being recognized on an international level.

== Industry event "Meeting Point – Vilnius" ==
International film industry professionals meet in Vilnius to discuss hot topics of today's and tomorrow's audiovisual world. The highlight of the industry event is the presentation of Lithuanian and Baltic film industry.

== Awards at Vilnius International Film Festival ==
=== The Audience Award ===
The oldest and one of the most important award of VIFF.

- 2004: Spring, Summer, Fall, Winter... and Spring, directed by Kim Ki-duk South Korea
- 2005: 3-Iron (Bin-jip), directed by Kim Ki-duk South Korea
- 2006: The Method, directed by Marcelo Piñeyro Argentina
- 2007: The Lives of Others, directed by Florian Henckel von Donnersmarck Germany
- 2008: 4 Months, 3 Weeks & 2 Days, directed by Cristian Mungiu Romania
- 2009: Camino, directed by Javier Fesser Spain
- 2010: Departures, directed by Yōjirō Takita Japan
- 2011: Incendies, directed by Denis Villeneuve Canada
- 2012: The Intouchables, directed by Olivier Nakache and Éric Toledano France
- 2013: Searching for Sugar Man, directed by Malik Bendjelloul Sweden
- 2014: Omar, directed by Hany Abu-Assad Palestine
- 2015: Mommy, directed by Xavier Dolan Canada
- 2016: Truman, directed by Cesc Gay Spain
- 2017: Perfect Strangers, directed by Paolo Genovese Italy
- 2018: Loving Vincent, directed by Dorota Kobiela Poland and Hugh Welchman United Kingdom
- 2019: Capernaum, directed by Nadine Labaki Lebanon
- 2020: Corpus Christi (Boże Ciało), directed by Jan Komasa Poland
- 2021: Quo Vadis, Aida?, directed by Jasmila Žbanić Bosnia and Herzegovina
- 2022: The Worst Person in the World, directed by Joachim Trier Norway
- 2023: The Eight Mountains, directed by Felix van Groeningen and Charlotte Vandermeersch Belgium
- 2024: Hoard, directed by Luna Carmoon United Kingdom
- 2025: The Seed of the Sacred Fig, directed by Mohammad Rasoulof Iran

=== The Audience Award (Lithuanian film) ===
Introduced in 2011.

- 2011: Book smuggler, directed by Jonas Trukanas
- 2012: The Last Day of the Honeymoon, directed by Rokas Eltermanas
- 2013: The Swimmer, directed by Gabrielė Urbonaitė
- 2014: The Invisible Front, directed by Vincas Sruoginis and Jonas Ohman
- 2015: Life Is Sacred, directed by Andreas Dalsgaard, Nicolas Servide and Vivana Gomez
- 2016: Junction, directed by Nathan Jurevicius
- 2017: Woman and the Glacier, directed by Andrius Stonys
- 2018: 100 Years Together, directed by Edita Kabaraitė
- 2019: Summer Survivors, directed by Marija Kavtaradzė
- 2015: – no award

=== The Audience Award (Short film) ===
Introduced in 2013.

- 2013: Buzkashi Boys, directed by Sam French United States
- 2014: Kush, directed by Shubhashish Bhutiani India
- 2015: – no award
- 2016: Otto, directed by Marieke Blaauw Netherlands, Joris Oprins Netherlands, Job Roggeveen Netherlands
- 2017: Running Lights, directed by Gediminas Šiaulys Lithuania
- 2018: Mother, directed by Rodrigo Sorogoyen Spain
- 2019: Family Unit, directed by Titas Laucius Lithuania
- 2015: – no award

=== Short Film Competition ===
Best short film, selected by a jury from short competition programme. Introduced in 2012.

- 2012: Beast (Csicka), directed by Attila Till Hungary
- 2013: The Whistle (Gwizdek), directed by Grzegorz Zariczny Poland
- 2014: Pandas, directed by Matus Vizar Slovakia
- 2015: Symphony No. 42, directed by Réka Bucsi Hungary
- 2016: Fear, directed by Michal Blaško Slovakia
- 2017: Close Ties, directed by Zofia Kowalewska Poland
- 2018: By The Pool, directed by Laurynas Bareiša Lithuania
- 2019: In Between, directed by Samir Karahoda Kosovo
- 2020: Journey Through a Body, directed by Camille Degeye France

=== European Debut Competition ===
Introduced in 2018

Jury

- 2018: Homayoun Ershadi, Audrius Stonys, Dagnė Vildžiūnaitė, Elad Samorzik, Kathleen Mclnnis
- 2019: Cosima Finkbeiner, Eglė Vertelytė, Marcin Pienkowski, Mark Peranson, Takeo Hisamatsu
- 2020: Rugilė Barzdžiukaitė, Evgeny Gusyatinskiy, Boyd van Hoeij, Jonas Holmberg, Katarzyna Sinarska

Best Actress

- 2018: Darya Zhovner (Russia) , film Closeness
- 2019: ?, film Journey To Mother's Room
- 2020: Roxanne Scrimshaw (United Kingdom) , Nichola Burley (United Kingdom) , film Lynn + Lucy

Best Director

- 2018: Bertrand Mandico (France) , film The Wild Boys
- 2019: Zsófia Szilágyi (Hungary) , film One Day
- 2020: Fyzal Boulifa (United Kingdom) , film Lynn + Lucy

Best Actor

- 2018: Elliott Crosset Hove (Denmark) , film Winter Brothers
- 2019: Paulius Markevičius (Lithuania) , film Summer Survivors
- 2020: Jérémie Laheurte (France) , Djanis Bouzyani (France) , Anthony Bajon (France) , film You Deserve a Lover

Best Film

- 2018: Winter Brothers, directed by Hlynur Pálmason (Denmark)
- 2019: Ray & Liz, directed by Richard Billingham (United Kingdom)
- 2020: The Metamorphosis of Birds, directed by Catarina Vasconcelos (Portugal)

CINEUROPE Prize

- 2019: Animus Animalis (A Story About People, Animals And Things), directed by Aistė Žegulytė (Lithuania)
- 2020: Nova Lituania, directed by Karolis Kaupinis (Lithuania)

== Retired Awards ==
=== Competition programme "New Europe – New Names" ===
Introduced 2009 - 2018 Retired The main awards at Vilnius International Film Festival. Introduced in 2009. Chosen by the international jury of the cinema industry professionals: actors, directors, programme directors, cinematographers and producers. The jury will select the best film of the festival and award it with two special prizes.

Best Film

- 2009: The World Is Big and Salvation Lurks Around the Corner, directed by Stefan Kitanov Bulgaria
- 2010: Eastern Plays, directed by Kamen Kalev Bulgaria
- 2011: Outbound (Periferic), directed by Bogdan George Apetri Romania
- 2012: Courage, directed by Grzegorz Zgliński Poland
- 2013: Loving (Miłość), directed by Slawomir Fabicki Poland
- 2014: Japanese Dog, directed by Tudor Cristian Jurgiu Romania
- 2015: Koza, directed by Ivan Ostrochovský Slovakia
- 2016 >1: I, Olga Hepnarová, directed by Petr Kazda Czech Republic and Tomáš Weinreb Czech Republic
- 2016 >2: Thirst, directed by Svetla Tsotsorkova Bulgaria
- 2017: The Last Family, directed by Ostatnia Rodzina Poland

Best Director Introduced 2009 - 2018 Retired

- 2009: Javor Gardev Bulgaria
- 2010: - no award
- 2011: - no award
- 2012: Adrian Sitaru Romania, film Best Intentions
- 2013: Mira Fornay Slovakia, film My Dog Killer,
- 2014: Levan Koguashvili Georgia, film Blind Dates (Brma paemnebi)
- 2015: Myroslav Slaboshpytskiy Ukraine, film The Tribe
- 2016: Agnieszka Smoczyńska Poland, film The Lure
- 2017: Kristina Grozeva and Petar Valchanov Bulgaria, film Glory,

Best Actors Introduced 2009 - 2018 Retired

- 2009: Miki Manojlovic Serbia, film The World Is Big and Salvation Lurks Around the Corner
- 2010: Vlad Ivanov Romania, film Police, Adjective
- 2011: Bartu Kucukcaglayan Turkey, film Majority
- 2012 >1: Anjela Nedyalkova Bulgaria, film Avé
- 2012 >2: Ada Condeescu Romania, film Loverboy
- 2012 >3: Isidora Simijonovic Serbia, film Clip
- 2013: Dan Chiorean Romania, film Rocker
- 2014: Actor: Igor Samobor Slovakia, film Class Enemy. Actress: Michaela Bendulova Slovakia, film Miracle
- 2015: Actor: Márton Kristóf Hungary, film Afterlife. Actress: Margita Gosheva Bulgaria, film The Lesson
- 2016: Actor: Uliks Fehmiu Serbia, film Our Everyday Life. Actress: Monika Naydenova Bulgaria, film Thirst
- 2017: Actor: Marius Repšys Lithuania, film The Saint. Actress: Mia Petričević Croatia, film Quit Staring at My Plate

CICAE jury film award Introduced 2009 - 2018 Retired

- 2009: - no award
- 2010: Eastern Plays, directed by Kamen Kalev Bulgaria
- 2011: On the Path, directed by Jasmila Žbanić Bosnia and Herzegovina
- 2012: director Adrian Sitaru Romania, film Best Intentions
- 2013: Keep Smiling (Gaigimet), directed by Rusudan Chkonia
- 2014: director Rok Biček Czech Republic, film Class Enemy
- 2015: Ivan Ostrochovský' Slovakia, film Koza
- 2016: Mirjana Karanović' Serbia, film A Good Wife
- 2017: film Glory Bulgaria

Special award

- 2010: Protector, directed by Marek Najbrt Czech Republic (for creative excellence)
- 2011: The House, directed by Zuzana Liová Slovakia

=== Competition programme "Baltic Gaze" ===
Introduced 2014 - 2018 Retired

Best Film

- 2014: The Hope Factory, directed by Natalia Meshaninova Russia
- 2015: Victoria, directed by Sebastian Schipper Germany
- 2016: Under the Sun, directed by Vitaly Mansky Ukraine
- 2017: Woman and the Glacier, directed by Andrius Stonys Lithuania

Best Director

- 2014: Paweł Pawlikowski Poland, film Ida
- 2015: Joshua Oppenheimer United States, film The Look of Silence
- 2016: Mantas Kvedaravičius Lithuania, film Mariupolis
- 2017: Sergei Loznitsa Germany, film Austerlitz

Best Actor

- 2014: Lauri Lagle Estonia, film Free Range
- 2015: Janusz Gajos Poland, film Body
- 2016: Oleg Maximov Russia, film Don Juan
- 2017: Petr Skvortsov Russia, film The Student

Best Actress

- 2014: Alexandra Finder Germany, film The Police Officer's Wife
- 2015: Bianca Kronlöf Sweden-Finland, film Underdog (Svenskjävel)
- 2016: Trine Dyrholm Denmark, film The Commune
- 2017: Lene Cecilia Sparrok Norway, film Sami Blood

Special mention

- 2014: - no mention
- 2015: Rocks in My Pockets directed by Signe Baumane Latvia
- 2016: Granny's Dancing on the Table directed by Hanna Sköld Sweden
- 2017: - no mention

=== Best Lithuanian Actress ===
Introduced by L'Oreal Paris in 2007 as "Lithuanian star", discontinued after 2010. Revived in 2012 as "Best Lithuanian Actress" with new sponsor Bourjois.

- 2007: Nelė Savičenko
- 2008: Larisa Kalpokaitė
- 2009: Gabija Ryškuvienė
- 2010: Edita Užaitė
- 2011: - no award
- 2012: Toma Vaškevičiūtė
- 2013: Valda Bičkutė
- 2014: Jurgita Jurkutė
- 2015: Aistė Diržiūtė
- 2016: Viktorija Kuodytė

=== Best Lithuanian Actor ===
Introduced in 2014.

- 2014: Giedrius Savickas
- 2015: Marius Repšys
- 2016: Juozas Budraitis

=== Lithuanian debut ===
Introduced in 2010.

- 2010: Lernavan, directed by Marat Sargsyan
- 2011: Barzakh, directed by Mantas Kvedaravičius
- 2012: A Place We Call Home, directed by Albina Griniūtė
- 2013: The Bomb, directed by Robertas Nevecka
- 2014: The Etude, directed by Austėja Urbaitė
- 2015: Fellow Travelers (Pakeliaiviai), directed by Linas Mikuta
- 2016 - no award

=== Special award. Since 2013 award of Saulius Macaitis ===
- 2012: Infinite Minutes (Vegtelen percek), directed by Cecilia Felméri Hungary
- 2013: No, directed by Pablo Larraín Chile
- 2014: Norte, the End of History, directed by Lav Diaz Philippines
- 2015: Timbuktu, directed by Abderrahmane Sissako Mauritania
- 2016: The Pearl Button, directed by Patricio Guzmán Chile

=== Special award for best film translations ===
- 2014: Ieva Mažeikaitė and Goda Lūčiūnienė
- 2015: Andrius Patiomkinas
