= Marija Kavtaradzė =

Lithuanian film director and screenwriter

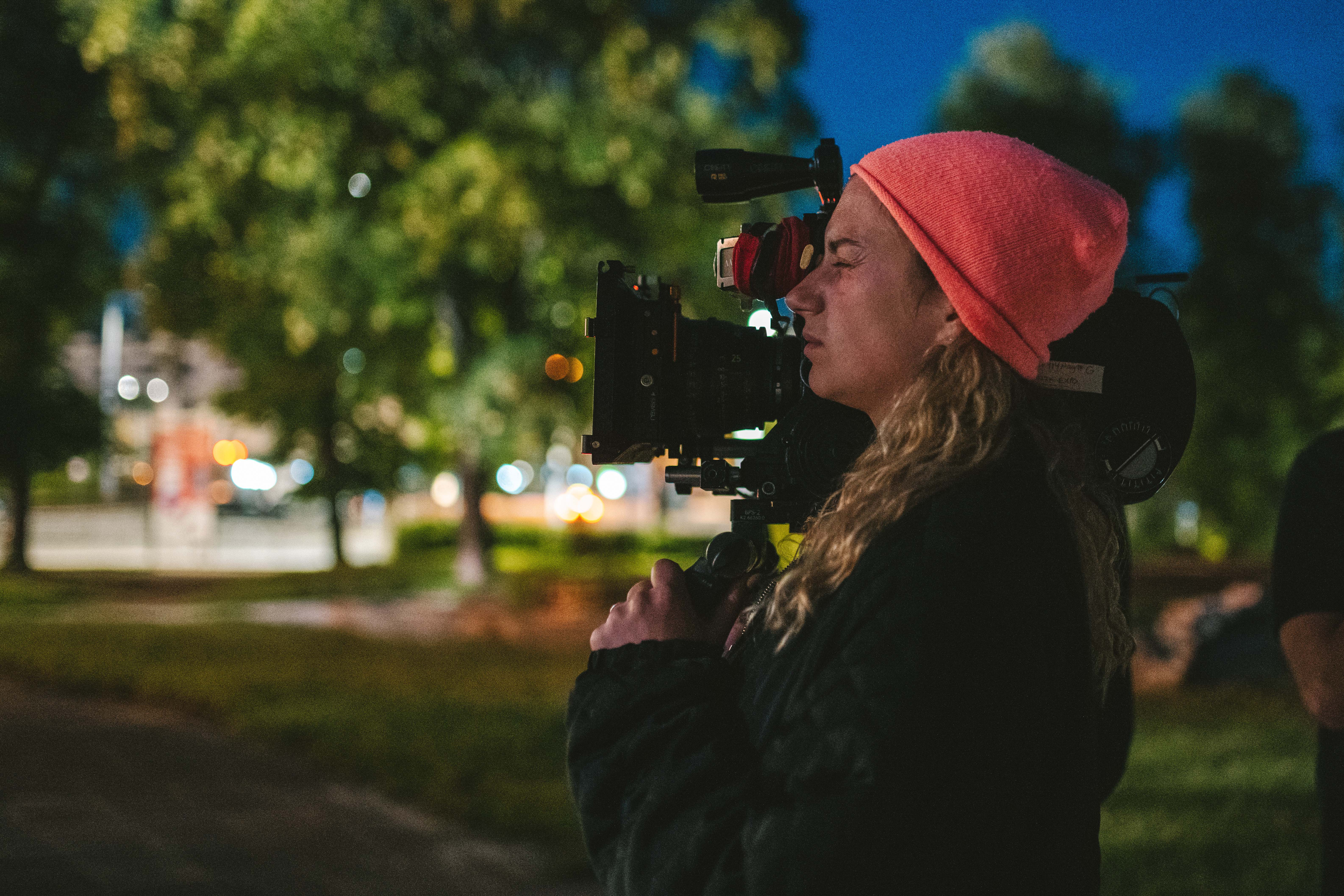
- Marija Kavtaradzė on the set of the film Slow (2023), Vilnius, night scene.
- Born: 3 June 1991 (age 35); Vilnius, Lithuania
- Occupations: Film director, screenwriter
- Years active: 2010–present
- Notable work: Slow; Summer Survivors; I'm Twenty Something

Marija Kavtaradzė (born 3 June 1991) is a Lithuanian film director and screenwriter.

== Biography ==
Marija Kavtaradzė studied filmmaking at the Lithuanian Academy of Music and Theatre from 2010 to 2014. During this period, she directed five short films, three of which were selected for the Vilnius International Film Festival (Kino pavasaris).

In 2016, Marija Kavtaradze co-wrote the feature film The Saint, directed by Andrius Blaževičius and produced by Marija Razgutė (M-Films). The film premiered at the Busan International Film Festival and the Warsaw International Film Festival in 2016.

In collaboration with director Andrius Blaževičius and Teklė Kavtaradzė, she co-wrote the 2021 feature film Runner, directed by Andrius Blaževičius and produced by Marija Razgutė. The film had its premiere at the Karlovy Vary International Film Festival in 2021.

She wrote and directed her first feature film, Summer Survivors, in 2018, also produced by Marija Razgutė (M-Films). The film had its world premiere at the Toronto International Film Festival in 2018 and went on to be selected for numerous festivals, winning three national film awards.

In 2023, she wrote and directed Slow, her third collaboration with producer Marija Razgutė (M-Films). The film premiered at the Sundance Film Festival, where Marija Kavtaradze won the Best Director award.

She also developed and co-wrote the 2024 debut feature film of Vytautas Katkus, The Visitor, produced by M-Films.

In 2026, she was a member of the Proxima Competition jury at the 60th Karlovy Vary International Film Festival.

== Filmography ==
Director

- 2010: Before Falling (short film)
- 2010: Washed Fairytale (short film)
- 2013: Youngblood (short film)
- 2013: The Accident (short film)
- 2013: Normal people don’t explode themselves (short film)
- 2014: Floor scrapers (short film)
- 2014: I'm Twenty Something (short film)
- 2015: Igloo (short film)
- 2018: Summer Survivors (feature film)
- 2023: Slow (feature film)

Screenwriter

- 2011: Laikinai (short film)
- 2016: The Saint (feature film)
- 2018: Nacionalinės Premijos Laureatų Vaikai (short film)
- 2019: Laukais (short film)
- 2020: Pieno Baras (short film)
- 2021: Runner (feature film)
- 2025: The Visitor (feature film)

== Awards and nominations ==
Awards

- 2010: Before Falling (Best Student Film at the Lithuanian Academy of Film Awards)
- 2013: Youngblood (Nominated for Best Student Film at the Lithuanian Academy of Film Awards)
- 2013: Normal people don’t explode themselves (Nominated for Best Student Film at the Lithuanian Academy of Film Awards)
- 2015: I'm Twenty Something (Best Student Film at the Lithuanian Academy of Film Awards)
- 2015: Igloo (Best Student Film at the Lithuanian Academy of Film Awards)
- 2018: Summer Survivors (3 Lithuanian Academy of Film Awards, Audience Award at the Festival del Cinema Europeo)
- 2023: Slow (Best Director at the 2023 Sundance Film Festival)

Nominations

- 2010: Before Falling (Lithuanian Academy of Film Awards)
- 2013: Youngblood (Lithuanian Academy of Film Awards)
- 2013: Normal people don’t explode themselves (Lithuanian Academy of Film Awards)
- 2015: I'm Twenty Something (Lithuanian Academy of Film Awards)
- 2015: Igloo (Lithuanian Academy of Film Awards)
