= Romualdas Granauskas =

Romualdas Granauskas (18 May 1939 – 28 October 2014) was a Lithuanian/Samogitian author and dramaturge. He was born in Mažeikiai, Lithuania.

== Biography ==
After finishing youth labour school in Seda, he worked with the Lithuanian newspaper "Mūsų žodis" and the magazine "Nemunas", established in Skuodas, as an editor. Later on he worked as construction worker, metalworker, radio reporter, and lectured in Mosėdis.

Granauskas started publishing his stories in 1954 in his collection "Medžių viršūnės" (eng. "Tops of the Trees") (1969), and in "Duonos valgytojai" (eng. "Bread Eaters") (1975), where he spoke about the elder generation of retiring farmers, also about their customs, daily life, moral code. One of the main creations of Romualdas Granauskas is considered to be the novella "Gyvenimas po klevu" (eng. "Life Under the Maple Tree") (1988), which drew the whole society's attention. Nature, history and mythology are the topics of one of the most mature and sophisticated novellas of R.Granauskas "Jaučio aukojimas" (eng. "Sacrifice of a Bull") (1975).

Duburys (Vortex) is a classical artistic novel covering the entire life of the main character during Soviet times in Lithuania (2003). He died in Vilnius on 28 October 2014, aged 75.

== Relevant literature ==
- Vaičenonienė, Jurgita. "Lithuanian literature in English: a corpus-based approach to the translation of author-specific neologisms." Doctoral dissertation, Vytautas Magnus University (2011).
- Vaičenonienė, Jurgita. "Lithuanian literature in English: The Two English Translation of Romualdas Granauska’s short story ‘The Bread Easters’ (1975)." Key Cultural Texts in Translation, Edited by Kirsten Malmkjær, Adriana Şerban, Fransiska Louwagie. Pp. 95-114. John Benjamins. 2018.
