= Pilgrims (film) =

2021 Lithuanian film

- Lithuanian theatrical release poster
- Lithuanian: Piligrimai
- Directed by: Laurynas Bareiša
- Screenplay by: Laurynas Bareiša
- Produced by: Klementina Remeikaitė
- Starring: Gabija Bargailaitė; Giedrius Kiela; Indrė Patkauskaitė; Paulius Markevičius
- Cinematography: Narvydas Naujalis
- Edited by: Laurynas Bareiša
- Production company: Afterschool Production
- Distributed by: REASON8
- Release dates: 8 September 2021 (Venice); 8 April 2022 (Lithuania)
- Running time: 92 minutes
- Country: Lithuania
- Language: Lithuanian

Pilgrims (Lithuanian: Piligrimai) is a 2021 Lithuanian crime drama film written, directed and edited by Laurynas Bareiša, in his feature film directorial debut.

The film won the Orizzonti competition at the 78th Venice International Film Festival. It was selected as the Lithuanian entry for the Best International Feature Film at the 95th Academy Awards.

== Plot ==
A woman and a friend travel to the small town where a crime was committed. They interview several people involved and gradually they unearth an unwelcome past.

== Cast ==
- Gabija Bargailaitė as Indrė
- Giedrius Kiela as Paulius
- Indrė Patkauskaitė as Ieva
- Paulius Markevičius as Martynas
- Jolanta Dapkūnaitė as Jolanta
- Ieva Andrejevaitė as Karolina

== Reception ==
On the review aggregator website Rotten Tomatoes, 100% of 7 critics' reviews are positive, with an average rating of 7/10.

== See also ==
- List of submissions to the 95th Academy Awards for Best International Feature Film
- List of Lithuanian submissions for the Academy Award for Best International Feature Film
