= Audrius Stonys =

Lithuanian documentary filmmaker (born 1966)

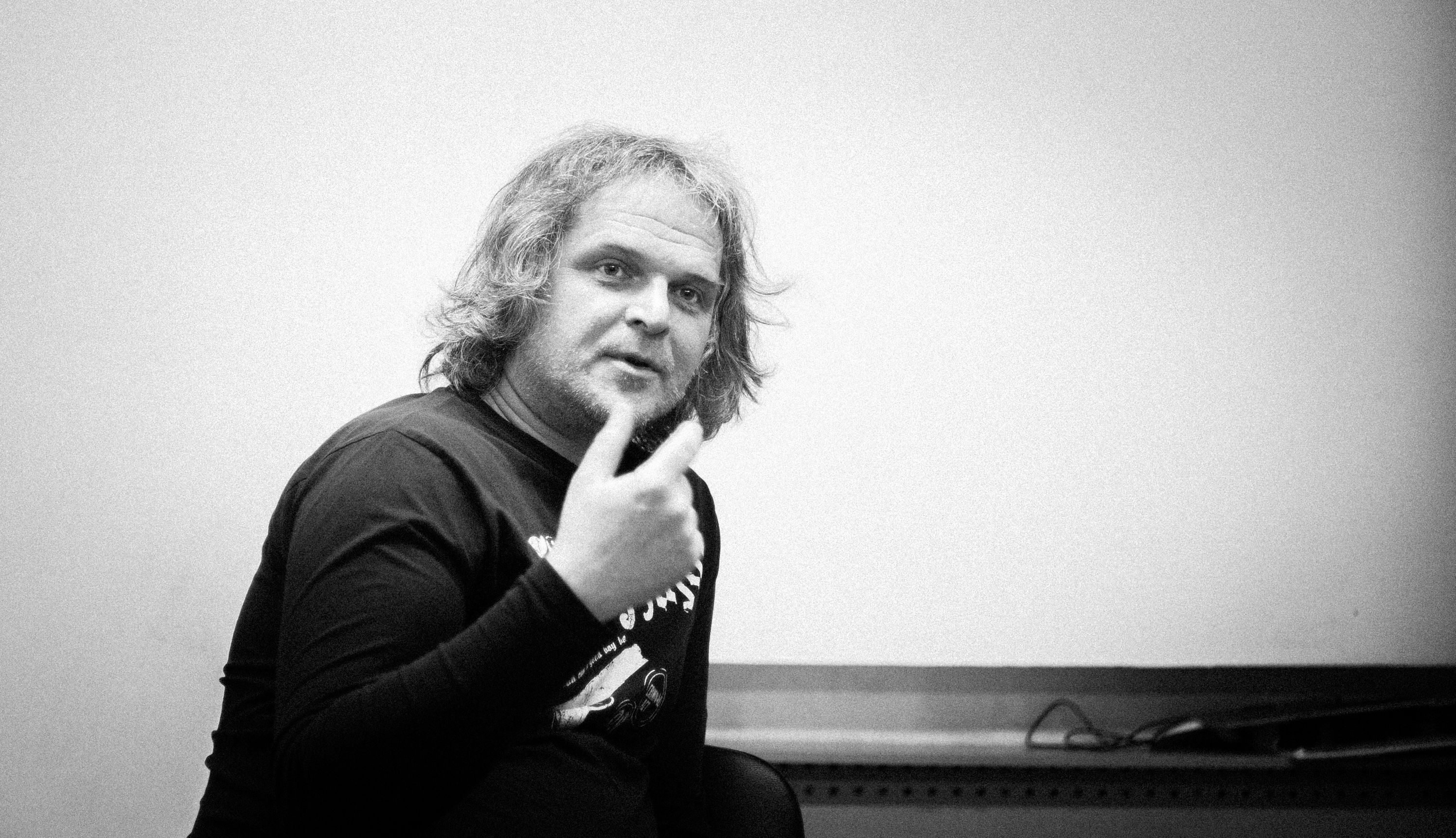
Audrius Stonys lecturing

Audrius Stonys (born April 28, 1966, in Vilnius) is a Lithuanian documentary filmmaker. He is recipient of the European Film Award for the documentary film Neregių žemė (Earth of the Blind) in 1992 and the Lithuanian National Prize in 2002. Since 1989 he has created 13 documentaries and one short fiction film. His film Skrydis per Lietuvą arba 510 sekundžių tylos (The Flight over Lithuania or 510 Seconds of Silence) co-created with Arūnas Matelis was well received at the Expo 2000. Stonys is a member of the European Documentary Network and European Film Academy.

His 2011 film Ramin was selected as the Lithuanian entry for the Best Foreign Language Oscar at the 85th Academy Awards, but it did not make the final shortlist.

== Awards and nominations ==
Year	Title	Award	Nominated work	Result
1992	"European Film Award"	Best film	"Neregių žemė"	Won
1997	"Findling Award"	Best film	"Skrajojimai mėlynam lauke"	Won
2003	"Findling Award"	Best film	"Fedia. Trys minutės po Didžiojo sprogimo"	Won
2008	Sidabrinė gervė	Best director	"Varpas"	Won
2020 (together with Kristīne Briede)	"Baltic Assembly Prize for Literature, the Arts and Science"	Baltic Assembly Prize for the Arts	n/a	Won
