= Sidabrinė gervė =

Lithuanian film awards

- Awarded for: Excellence in cinematic and television achievements
- Country: Lithuania
- Presented by: Audiovisual works copyright association AVAKA
- First award: 2008
- Website: sidabrinegerve.lt

Sidabrinė gervė (Silver Crane) are the Lithuanian film industry awards for best actors, directors and films. The annual awards were initiated in 2008 by AVAKA (audiovizualinių kūrinių autorių teisių asociacija), the (national) Association for Author Rights of Audiovisual Artists. The award statuette of the crane was created by Audrius Liaudanskas. In Lithuanian, as in English, the word "gervė", 'crane', means both a bird and a lifting device on which cameramen ride.

During the ceremony, the Golden Crane (Auksinė gervė) award, for the merits to the national cinema, is also presented. Also, since 2009 an award for the best student work of the year was issued, which was named Sidabrinės gervės kiaušinis ("Silver crane egg") in 2012.

During 2008-2018 the award event was organized by the Lithuanian Film Academy In 2019 the Lithuanian Film Academy retired due bankruptcy. As a result the awards for that year were cancelled. Lithuanian film industry awards "Silver Crane" returned in 2020 and was held by the AVAKA, which, after announcing the competition in 2019, acquired the rights to the Silver Crane Award.

== Categories ==
=== Merit awards ===
- Best Film
- Best Director
- Best Actor
- Best Actress
- Best Supporting Actor
- Best Supporting Actress
- Best Screenplay
- Best Documentary Feature
- Best Animated Feature
- Best Short Film
- Best Cinematography
- Best Score
- Best Art Direction
- Best Individual Achievement

=== Special awards ===
- Golden Egg for Best Student Film
- Golden Crane for Lifetime Achievement
- Audience Award

=== Irregular / Retired awards ===
- Best TV Film
- Best Co-Production
- Best Documentary Short
- Best Leading Performance
- Best Supporting Performance

== Ceremonies ==
Edition	Date	Best Film
1st	29 May 2008	The Collectress
2nd	29 May 2009	Vortex
3rd	28 May 2010	Eastern Drift
4th	27 May 2011	Back to Your Arms
5th	13 May 2012	The Fortress of Sleeping Butterflies
6th	11 May 2013	Aurora
7th	2 May 2014	The Gambler
8th	30 May 2015	The Summer of Sangailė
9th	27 May 2016	Peace to Us in Our Dreams
10th	13 June 2017	The Saint
11th	13 June 2018	Miracle
—N/a	2019	Cancelled due to bankruptcy
12th	22 November 2020	For 2019: Summer Survivors, for 2020: Nova Lituania
—N/a	2021	Cancelled due to the COVID-19 pandemic
13th	5 June 2022	Pilgrims
14th	4 June 2023	Remember to Blink
15th	9 June 2024	Slow
16th	8 June 2025	The Southern Chronicles
