= Laurynas Bareiša =

Lithuanian filmmaker (born 1988)

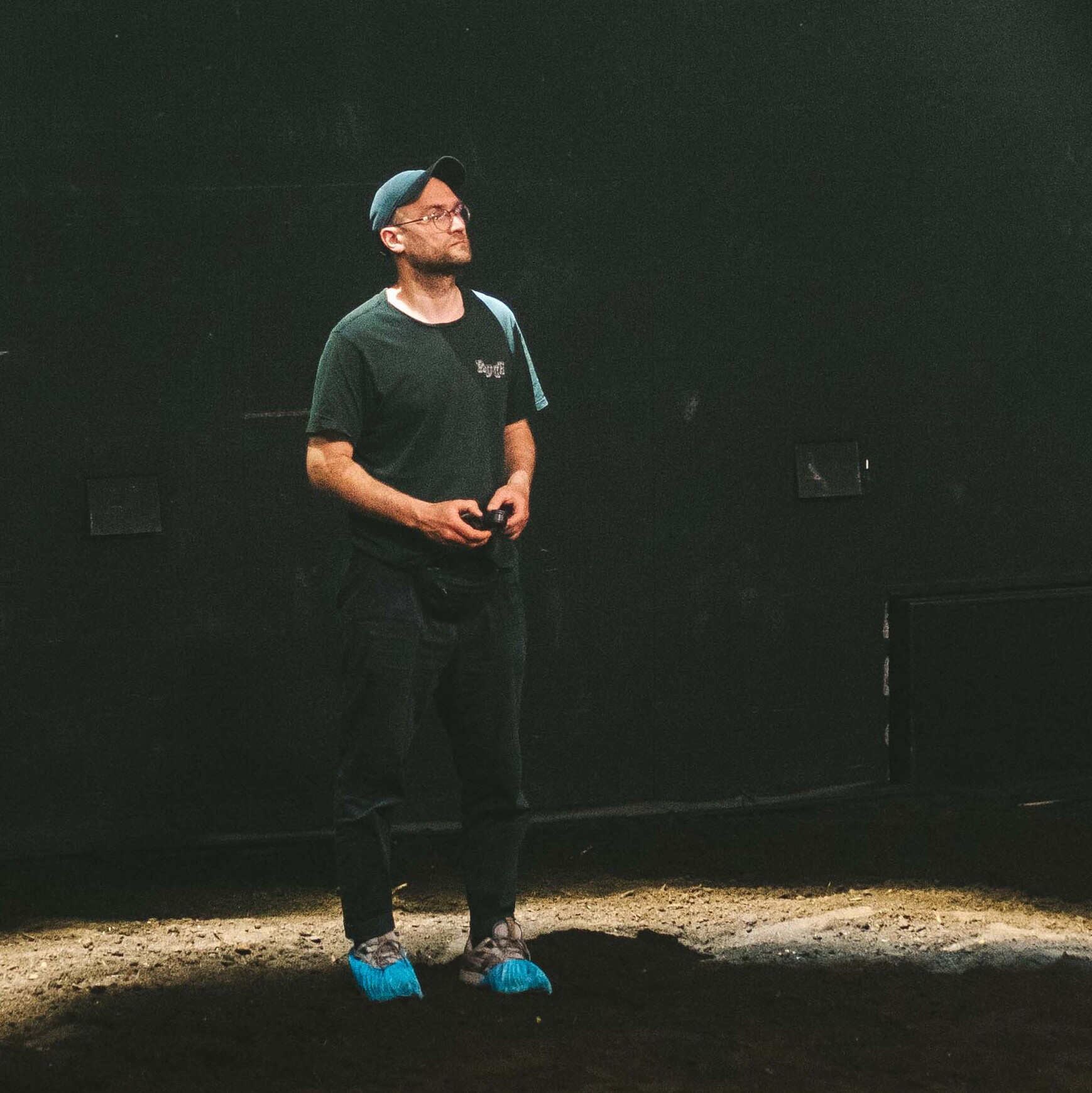
- Bareiša lighting a scene for the 2023 film Slow
- Born: February 26, 1988 (age 37); Kaunas, Lithuania
- Occupation(s): Film director, cinematographer

Laurynas Bareiša (born February 26, 1988) is a Lithuanian filmmaker. After beginning his career as a cinematographer, he directed a series of short films followed by the feature films Pilgrims and Drowning Dry.

== Early life and education ==
Bareiša was born in Kaunas, Lithuania. He earned bachelor's degrees in applied mathematics and cinematography from Vilnius University and the Lithuanian Academy of Music and Theatre, respectively. In 2016, he graduated with a master's degree in film directing.

== Career ==
After serving for years as a cinematographer, Bareiša's 2014 directorial debut, the short film Dembava, was named one of the Top 5 Short Films of 2014 by Cineuropa. He directed the 2017 short films The Camel and By the Pool; the latter premiered in the Orizzonti section of the 74th Venice International Film Festival.

Bareiša's short film Caucasus premiered in the Pardi di Domani section of the 2018 Locarno Film Festival. His short film Dummy premiered at the 2020 Berlin International Film Festival.

Bareiša's 2021 feature-length debut Pilgrims starred Gabija Bargailaite and Giedrius Kiela as the brother and girlfriend of a murder victim. The film debuted at the 78th Venice International Film Festival, where it was awarded the Orizzonti prize. Pilgrims was nominated in 11 categories at the Lithuanian Film Awards. Bareiša won in three categories (Best Film, Best Director, and Best Screenplay), while Giedrius Kiela won Best Actor.

In 2024, Bareiša's film Drowning Dry premiered in the Concorso Internazionale section of the 77th Locarno Film Festival in competition for the Golden Leopard. For the film, he was recognized with the festival's Best Direction Award while the principal cast received the Best Performance Award.

== Filmography ==
Year	English title	Original title	Notes	Ref.
2014	Dembava		Short film	
2017	The Camel		Short film	
2017	By the Pool		Short film	
2018	Caucasus		Short film	
2020	Dummy	Akturimas	Short film	
2021	Pilgrims	Piligrimai	—	
2024	Drowning Dry	Seses	—	

== Awards and nominations ==
Year	Award	Category	Nominated work	Result	Ref.
2020	Berlin International Film Festival	Golden Bear for Best Short Film	Dummy	Nominated	
2020	Regard: Saguenay International Short Film Festival	Grand Prix, International Competition	Dummy	Won	
2020	Palm Springs International ShortFest	Best Live Action Short	Dummy	Won	
2021	Venice Film Festival	Orizzonti	Pilgrims	Won	
2022	Lithuanian Film Awards	Best Director	Pilgrims	Won	
2022	Lithuanian Film Awards	Best Actor	Pilgrims	Won	
2022	Lithuanian Film Awards	Best Screenplay	Pilgrims	Won	
2022	Lithuanian Film Awards	Best Editing	Pilgrims	Nominated	
2024	Locarno Film Festival	Golden Leopard	Drowning Dry	Nominated	
2024	Locarno Film Festival	Best Direction Award	Drowning Dry	Won	
