= 26th Buil Film Awards =

2017 Korean award ceremony

- Date: October 13, 2017

The 26th Buil Film Awards (Korean: 부일영화상) ceremony was hosted by the Busan-based daily newspaper Busan Ilbo. It was held on October 13, 2017.

== Nominations and winners ==
Complete list of nominees and winners:

(Winners denoted in bold)

Best Film	Best Director
**A Taxi Driver**; The Age of Shadows; Anarchist from Colony; Asura: The City of Madness; The Day After	**Kim Sung-su** - **Asura: The City of Madness**; Hong Sang-soo - The Day After; Kim Jee-woon - The Age of Shadows; Kim Soo-hyun - Beaten Black and Blue; Lee Joon-ik - Anarchist from Colony
Best Actor	Best Actress
**Song Kang-ho** - **A Taxi Driver**; Cho Jin-woong - Bluebeard; Jung Woo-sung - Asura: The City of Madness; Kwon Hae-hyo - The Day After; Lee Je-hoon - Anarchist from Colony	**Youn Yuh-jung** - **The Bacchus Lady**; Gong Hyo-jin - Missing; Kim Ha-neul - Misbehavior; Kim Min-hee - On the Beach at Night Alone; Kim Ok-bin - The Villainess
Best Supporting Actor	Best Supporting Actress
**Kim Hee-won** - **The Merciless**; Ju Ji-hoon - Asura: The City of Madness; Kim Dae-myung - Bluebeard; Ryu Jun-yeol - The King; Uhm Tae-goo - The Age of Shadows	**Kim Su-an** - **The Battleship Island**; Bae Doona - The Tunnel; Kim So-jin - The King; Ra Mi-ran - The Last Princess; Yoo In-young - Misbehavior
Best New Actor	Best New Actress
**Koo Kyo-hwan** - **Jane**; Kim Jun-han - Anarchist from Colony; Lee Joo-won - Alone; Lee Won-keun - Misbehavior; Park Seo-joon - Midnight Runners	**Choi Hee-seo** - **Anarchist from Colony**; Lee Joo-young - Jane; Lee Min-ji - Jane; Lee Sang-hee - Our Love Story; Lee Soo-kyung - Yongsoon
Best New Director	Best Screenplay
**Lee Hyun-ju** - **Our Love Story**; Cho Hyun-hoon - Jane; Lee Joo-young - Single Rider; Lee Yo-sup - The Queen of Crime; Ko Bong-soo - Delta Boys	**Hwang Seong-gu** - **Anarchist from Colony**; Cho Hyun-hoon, Kim So-mi - Jane; Hong Eun-mi - Missing; Lee Ji-min, Park Jong-dae - The Age of Shadows; Lee Soo-yeon - Bluebeard
Best Cinematography	Best Art Direction
**Park Jung-hoon** - **The Villainess**; Go Nak-seon - A Taxi Driver; Kim Ji-yong - The Age of Shadows; Kim Woo-hyung - The King; Lee Mo-gae - Asura: The City of Madness	**Lee Hwo-kyung** - **The Battleship Island**; Cho Hwa-sung and Jeong Yi-jin - A Taxi Driver; Jang Geun-young - Asura: The City of Madness; Jo Hwa-seong - The Age of Shadows; Lee Na-gyeom - The King
Best Music	Buil Readers' Jury Award
**Flash Flood Darlings** - **Jane**; Bang Jun-seok - The Battleship Island; Jo Yeong-wook - A Taxi Driver; Lee Jae-jin - Asura: The City of Madness; Mowg - The Age of Shadows	**A Taxi Driver**
Yu Hyun-mok Film Arts Award
**Kim Ji-seok**
