= Darcy Paquet =

American film critic, university lecturer, subtitler, author and actor

- Born: 1972 (age 53–54); Massachusetts, United States
- Education: Carleton College; Indiana University Bloomington
- Occupations: Film critic University lecturer Author

Darcy Paquet (born 1972) is an American film critic, university lecturer, author and actor. In 2010, Paquet was awarded the Korea Film Reporters Association Award at the 15th Busan International Film Festival for his contributions in introducing Korean cinema to the world. Paquet was also the founder and organiser of Wildflower Film Awards Korea, which presents the Wildflower Film Awards.

== Education ==
Paquet, a Massachusetts native, majored in Russian at Carleton College in Minnesota and earned a master's in applied linguistics at Indiana University.

== Career ==
After making many Korean friends in graduate school, Paquet went to Seoul in 1997 to teach English at Korea University and planned to stay briefly before going to the Czech Republic.

Since 1998, Paquet has served as a special adviser and English-language editor for the Korean Film Council.

In 1999, he created the website Koreanfilm.org to introduce Korean films. From 2003 to 2011, he also wrote a monthly column for the Korean film weekly Cine21.

In 2009, Paquet published a book, New Korean Cinema: Breaking the Waves, about the changes in Korean cinema from the 1980s to 2000s.

At the 15th Busan International Film Festival in 2010, Paquet received the Korea Film Reporters Association Award for his contributions to promoting Korean cinema to the world.

Paquet has been the English subtitle translator for numerous Korean films, some examples include:

- Barking Dogs Never Bite (2000) by Bong Joon-ho
- Memories of Murder (2003) by Bong Joon-ho
- The Host (2006) by Bong Joon-ho
- Mother (2009) by Bong Joon-ho
- Ode to My Father (2014) by Yoon Je-kyoon
- Assassination (2015) by Choi Dong-hoon
- The Handmaiden (2016) by Park Chan-wook
- The Age of Shadows (2016) by Kim Jee-woon
- The Day After (2017) by Hong Sang-soo
- Parasite (2019) by Bong Joon-ho
- Decision to Leave (2022) by Park Chan-wook
- Next Sohee (2022) by Jung Ju-ri
- Broker (2022) by Hirokazu Kore-eda
- The Dream Songs (2022) by Cho Hyun-chul
- Hopeless (2023) by Kim Chang-hoon
- Cobweb (2023) by Kim Jee-woon
- Concrete Utopia (2023) by Um Tae-hwa

He was appointed an honorary citizen of Busan in 2020 for "his contributions to the city's film education."

== Personal life ==
Paquet met his wife Yeon Hyeon-sook in 1998 and they married after dating for three years. They have two sons.

== Filmography ==
=== Film ===
| Year | Title | Role |
|---|---|---|
| 2010 | One Night Stand segment: "First Night" | Rohmer |
| 2011 | Dance Town | (cameo) |
| 2012 | The Taste of Money | Robert Altman |
| 2012 | The Weight | Minister (cameo) |
| 2012 | Almost Che | Andrei |
| 2012 | Ari Ari the Korean Cinema | |
| 2014 | Santa Barbara | United States agent |
| 2017 | Anarchist from Colony | |
| 2020 | The Woman Who Ran | Foreign audience member |

=== Television series ===
| Year | Title | Role | Network |
|---|---|---|---|
| 2014 | Three Days | | SBS |
| 2021 | Joseon Exorcist | John | SBS |

== Bibliography ==
- Paquet, Darcy (2009). New Korean cinema : breaking the waves. London: Wallflower. ISBN 978-0-231-85012-4. OCLC 813843988.
