= Electric Child =

2024 science fiction film

- Directed by: Simon Jaquemet
- Screenplay by: Simon Jaquemet
- Produced by: Michela Pini; Aurelius Eisenreich; Simon Jaquemet
- Starring: Elliott Crosset Hove; Rila Fukushima; Sandra Guldberg Kampp
- Cinematography: Gabriel Sandru
- Edited by: Caterina Mona
- Music by: Wiwek Mahabali
- Production companies: 8horses; Perron X; unafilm; Revolver; Epic media
- Release date: 9 August 2024 (Switzerland)
- Running time: 118 minutes
- Countries: Switzerland; Germany; Philippines
- Language: English

Electric Child is a 2024 internationally co-produced science fiction film written and directed by Simon Jaquemet and starring Elliott Crosset Hove, Rila Fukushima, and Sandra Guldberg Kampp.

== Premise ==
A computer scientist working on a new form of artificial intelligence makes a deal with his creation to save his newborn son with a serious illness. This agreement has unforeseen consequences for humankind.

== Cast ==
- Elliott Crosset Hove
- Rila Fukushima
- Sandra Guldberg Kampp
- João Nunes Monteiro
- Helen Schneider

== Production ==
Fundraising for Electric Child began at the 2020 Berlin Film Festival. The filmmakers sought additional financial support at the Gap-Financing Market at the Venice Production Bridge during the 2021 Venice Film Festival. Filming took place in Germany, Switzerland, and the Philippines.

== Release ==
Electric Child was selected to premiere at the 77th Locarno Film Festival on 9 August 2024.
