= The Flood (2024 film) =

2024 film directed by Gianluca Jodice

- French: Le Déluge
- Directed by: Gianluca Jodice
- Screenplay by: Gianluca Jodice; Filippo Gravino
- Produced by: Matteo Rovere; Andrea Paris; Yann Zenou
- Starring: Guillaume Canet; Mélanie Laurent
- Cinematography: Daniele Ciprì
- Production companies: Ascent Film; Quad
- Distributed by: Memento Distribution
- Release dates: 7 August 2024 (Locarno Film Festival); 21 November 2024 (Italy); 25 December 2024 (France)
- Running time: 101 minutes
- Countries: France; Italy
- Language: French

The Flood (French: Le Déluge) is a 2024 historical drama film directed by Gianluca Jodice from a screenplay written by Jodice and Filippo Gravino. The film stars Guillaume Canet and Mélanie Laurent as Louis XVI and Marie Antoinette at the end of their reign.

== Premise ==
In 1792, Louis XVI has been imprisoned in the Tour du Temple with his wife Marie Antoinette and their children ahead of their upcoming trial.

== Cast ==
- Guillaume Canet as Louis XVI
- Mélanie Laurent as Marie Antoinette
- Aurore Broutin as Madame Elisabeth
- Hugo Dillon as Henri
- Tom Hudson as Manuel
- Roxane Duran as Madame de Lamballe
- Anouk Darwin Homewood as Marie Thérèse
- Vidal Arzoni as Le Dauphin Louis-Charles de France
- Fabrizio Rongione as Cléry
- Christoph Perez as Maximilien de Robespierre

== Production ==
Filming lasted six weeks in Turin and Rome, concluding in May 2023. Paolo Sorrentino served as executive producer.

== Release ==
The Flood was selected to open the 77th Locarno Film Festival on 7 August 2024.
