= The Bad Poet =

2020 Italian biographical drama film

- Film poster
- Italian: Il cattivo poeta
- Directed by: Gianluca Jodice
- Written by: Gianluca Jodice
- Produced by: Andrea Paris; Matteo Rovere
- Starring: Sergio Castellitto
- Cinematography: Daniele Ciprì
- Edited by: Simona Paggi
- Music by: Michele Braga
- Release dates: 8 September 2020 (Pescara); 20 May 2021 (Italy)
- Running time: 106 minutes
- Country: Italy
- Language: Italian

The Bad Poet (Italian: Il cattivo poeta) is a 2020 Italian biographical-drama film directed by Gianluca Jodice. The film is inspired by the book by the Italian journalist and writer Roberto Festorazzi, D'Annunzio e la piovra fascista, first published by Minotauro in 2005 and republished by Silicio-Editoriale Lombarda in 2020. The film focuses on the last years of the poet Gabriele D'Annunzio, played by Sergio Castellitto, and on his ambiguous relationship with fascism.

== Plot ==
1936. The young Giovanni Comini, a convinced supporter of the Fascist Party, was promoted to the position of federal secretary of Brescia. Shortly after his appointment, Achille Starace entrusted him with a crucial mission because of his flair for poetry: he was to get into the good graces of the great poet Gabriele D'Annunzio, known as 'Il Vate' ('The Bard') and spy on him for the regime. The poet had long been intolerant of Fascism, and since a new war was considered to be just around the corner, Starace feared that if a person of such popularity spoke out against the alliance between Mussolini and Hitler, popular trust would be undermined.

Comini became a regular visitor to the Vittoriale, where D'Annunzio had long since retired into exile, assisted by his faithful Luisa and Amèlie. The Vate, now old, lives in complete seclusion; lost in the memory of his past glories, he limits his public outings to a minimum and is addicted to cocaine. However, he became very fond of Comini, even though he was aware of his mission from the start; the young federal also gradually began to be fascinated by the poet.

When he learns that Mussolini is about to travel to Germany to be received by Hitler, D'Annunzio asks Comini to arrange a meeting with the Duce, so that he can try to dissuade him from his intentions. The young man tries in vain. In the meantime, Comini is having a love affair with a woman, Lina, who will kill herself following the arrest of her anti-fascist half-brother. The young federal starts to doubt fascism.

In 1937, on the death of Guglielmo Marconi, D'Annunzio was appointed ex officio president of the Accademia d'Italia; the Vate, meanwhile, began to show signs of imbalance and impatience. The poet manages to meet the Duce at Verona Porta Nuova Station, on his return from his trip to Germany. Here, D'Annunzio tried to warn the Duce of the dangers of an alliance with Hitler, but the latter ignored him and treated him with extreme condescension. D'Annunzio, distraught, ends up having a mental and physical breakdown, after which he says goodbye to his friend Comini forever, revealing that opposing the war is his duty and that he will try again when he goes to Rome to accept the post of President of the Academy. On his return, however, Comini was severely reprimanded by Starace for highlighting in his dossiers the popular impatience with the alliance between Hitler and Mussolini.

A year later Gabriele D'Annunzio died in unclear circumstances. During his funeral, attended by the Duce himself, Luisa gave Comini a peacock feather that had belonged to the Vate, as a symbol of their friendship. Comini is later demoted because of his opposition to the alliance between Hitler and Mussolini, and Luisa and Amèlie have to leave the Vittoriale forever.

== Cast ==
- Sergio Castellitto as Gabriele D'Annunzio
- Francesco Patanè as Giovanni Comini
- Tommaso Ragno as Giancarlo Maroni
- Clotilde Courau as Amélie Mazoyer
- Fausto Russo Alesi as Achille Starace
- Massimiliano Rossi as Commissioner Rizzo
- Elena Bucci as Luisa Baccara
- Lidiya Liberman as Lina
- Janina Rudenska as Emy Heufler
- Lino Musella as Carletto
- Antonio Piovanelli as General Noseda
- Paolo Graziosi as Comini' father
- Marcello Romolo as Giuseppe Cobolli Gigli
- Raffaello Gaimari as Paolo
- Maurizio Fanin as Dr. Duse
- Vincenzo Pirrotta as Benito Mussolini

== Release ==
The film premiered at the Aurum Museum in Pescara, on 8 September 2020. It was expected to be theatrically released on 12 November 2020, but it was delayed to 20 May 2021 due to the second outbreak of the COVID-19 pandemic in Italy.
