= Nowhere to Lay My Eyes =

2026 South Korean drama film

- International promotional poster
- Hangul: 눈둘데가 없네
- RR: Nunduldega eomne
- MR: Nunduldega ŏmne
- Directed by: Hong Sang-soo
- Written by: Hong Sang-soo
- Produced by: Hong Sang-soo
- Starring: Kim Min-hee; Choi Myung-gil; Kwon Hae-hyo; Shin Seok-ho; Park Mi-so
- Cinematography: Hong Sang-soo
- Edited by: Hong Sang-soo
- Music by: Hong Sang-soo
- Production company: Jeonwonsa Film
- Distributed by: Finecut
- Release dates: August 13, 2026 (Locarno); October 21, 2026 (South Korea)
- Running time: 72 minutes
- Country: South Korea
- Language: Korean

Nowhere to Lay My Eyes (Korean: 눈둘데가 없네; RR: Nunduldega eomne) is a 2026 South Korean drama film written, produced, edited, scored and directed by Hong Sang-soo. It follows Sang-hee (Kim Min-hee) as she visits her mother with her younger brother, who has settled on Jeju Island with her stepfather.

The film had its world premiere at the main competition of the 79th Locarno Film Festival on August 13, 2026, where it won the Pardo for Best Direction for Hong and the Pardo for Best Performance for Min-hee. It will be theatrically released in South Korean on October 21.

== Synopsis ==
Sang-hee, raised by her grandparents after her parents divorced, travels with her younger brother to visit their mother on Jeju Island a decade after their last meeting. Her mother now runs a successful restaurant, while Sang-hee's stepfather is absorbed in making a film about a "grass tomb," and his daughter has started painting. Over the course of the visit, small revelations, unsolicited advice, and polite but cheap compliments were exchanged. On the morning of her departure, the family gathered to watch one of Sang-hee's films, offering a quiet moment of reflection.

== Cast ==
- Kim Min-hee as Sang-hee
- Choi Myung-gil
- Kwon Hae-hyo
- Shin Seok-ho
- Park Mi-so

== Release ==
Nowhere to Lay My Eyes had its world premiere at the 79th Locarno Film Festival on August 13, 2026, where it competed for Golden Leopard. It had its North American premiere in the Main Slate of the 2026 New York Film Festival on 26 September. It also featured in Asiascope section of Filmfest Hamburg on 27 September 2026. On October 7, 2026, it was showcased in 'Showcase' section at the 2026 Vancouver International Film Festival. It was also screened in 'Icons' section of the 31st Busan International Film Festival on October 7, 2026.

It was screened in Departure section at the 62nd Chicago International Film Festival on October 16, 2026.

The film will be released in South Korean theatres after its premiere at Busan International Film Festival, on October 21, 2026.

It will be screened in the Horizon section of the 37th Singapore International Film Festival on 24 October 2026.

== Accolades ==
Award	Date of ceremony	Category	Recipient	Result	Ref.
Locarno Film Festival	15 August 2026	Golden Leopard	Nowhere to Lay My Eyes	Nominated	
Locarno Film Festival	15 August 2026	Pardo for Best Direction	Hong Sang-soo	Won	
Locarno Film Festival	15 August 2026	Prize of the Ecumenical Jury	Hong Sang-soo	Won	
Locarno Film Festival	15 August 2026	Pardo for Best Performance	Kim Min-hee	Won	
