= Bogancloch =

2024 film directed by Ben Rivers

- Film poster
- Directed by: Ben Rivers
- Produced by: Ben Rivers; Sarah Neely; John Archer
- Starring: Jake Williams
- Cinematography: Ben Rivers
- Edited by: Ben Rivers
- Production companies: Urth Productions; Hopscotch Films
- Distributed by: New Wave Films (United Kingdom)
- Release dates: 9 August 2024 (Locarno); 18 August 2024 (Edinburgh)
- Running time: 86 minutes
- Countries: United Kingdom; Germany; Iceland
- Languages: English; Scots

Bogancloch is a 2024 documentary film directed by Ben Rivers. A follow-up to the director's 2011 documentary Two Years at Sea, the film once again concerns the daily life of Jake Williams, a modern day hermit in rural Scotland.

Bogancloch competed for the Golden Leopard at the 77th Locarno Film Festival in August 2024.

== Premise ==
For the past four decades, Jake Williams has led a solitary life in the Clashindarroch Forest in rural Scotland. Bogancloch follows Williams through both his daily routines and staged scenarios.

== Production ==
Rivers met Jake Williams in 2005. The pair first collaborated on the short film This Land is My Land, followed by the 2011 feature documentary Two Years at Sea. As he did for Two Years at Sea, Rivers shot Bogancloch in black-and-white on 16 mm film.

== Cast ==
- Jake Williams as himself

== Release ==
Bogancloch was acquired for international sales by Rediance and debuted on 9 August 2024 in competition at the Locarno Film Festival. The film will also screen at the Edinburgh International Film Festival.

== Reception ==
=== Accolades ===
Award	Ceremony date	Category	Recipient(s)	Result	Ref.
Locarno Film Festival	18 August 2024	Golden Leopard	Bogancloch	Nominated	
