= Drowning Dry =

2024 Lithuanian film

- Theatrical release poster
- Lithuanian: Sesės
- Directed by: Laurynas Bareiša
- Written by: Laurynas Bareiša
- Produced by: Klementina Remeikaitė
- Starring: Gelmine Glemzaite; Agne Kaktaite; Giedrius Kiela; Paulius Markevicius
- Cinematography: Laurynas Bareiša
- Edited by: Silvija Vilkaitė
- Production company: Afterschool Production
- Release date: 10 August 2024 (Locarno)
- Running time: 88 minutes
- Countries: Lithuania; Latvia
- Language: Lithuanian
- Box office: $315,136

Drowning Dry (Lithuanian: Sesės, lit. 'Sisters') is a 2024 drama film written and directed by Laurynas Bareiša starring Gelmine Glemzaite, Agne Kaktaite, Giedrius Kiela, and Paulius Markevicius.

A Lithuanian-Latvian co-production, the film premiered at the 77th Locarno Film Festival, where Bareiša received the Pardo for Best Direction while the film's principal cast was recognized with the Pardo for Best Performance. It was selected as Lithuanian's entry for the 97th Academy Awards for Best International Feature Film, but was not nominated.

== Premise ==
Ernesta and her sister Justė gather at a lakeside cabin for a weekend getaway with their husbands (Lukas and Tomas, respectively) and children. The vacation takes a dark turn when Justė's daughter falls into the lake, unable to swim to safety. Details about the accident and its aftermath are revealed in a series of flashbacks as the family tries to move on from the tragedy.

== Cast ==
- Gelminė Glemžaitė as Ernesta
- Paulius Markevičius as Lukas, Ernesta's husband
- Agnė Kaktaitė as Justė, Ernesta's sister
- Giedrius Kiela as Tomas, Justė's husband

== Production ==
Laurynas Bareiša wrote, directed, and served as cinematographer for Drowning Dry, which was produced through his company Afterschool Production. In developing the script, Bareiša consulted with medical professionals to learn more about dry drowning.

== Release ==
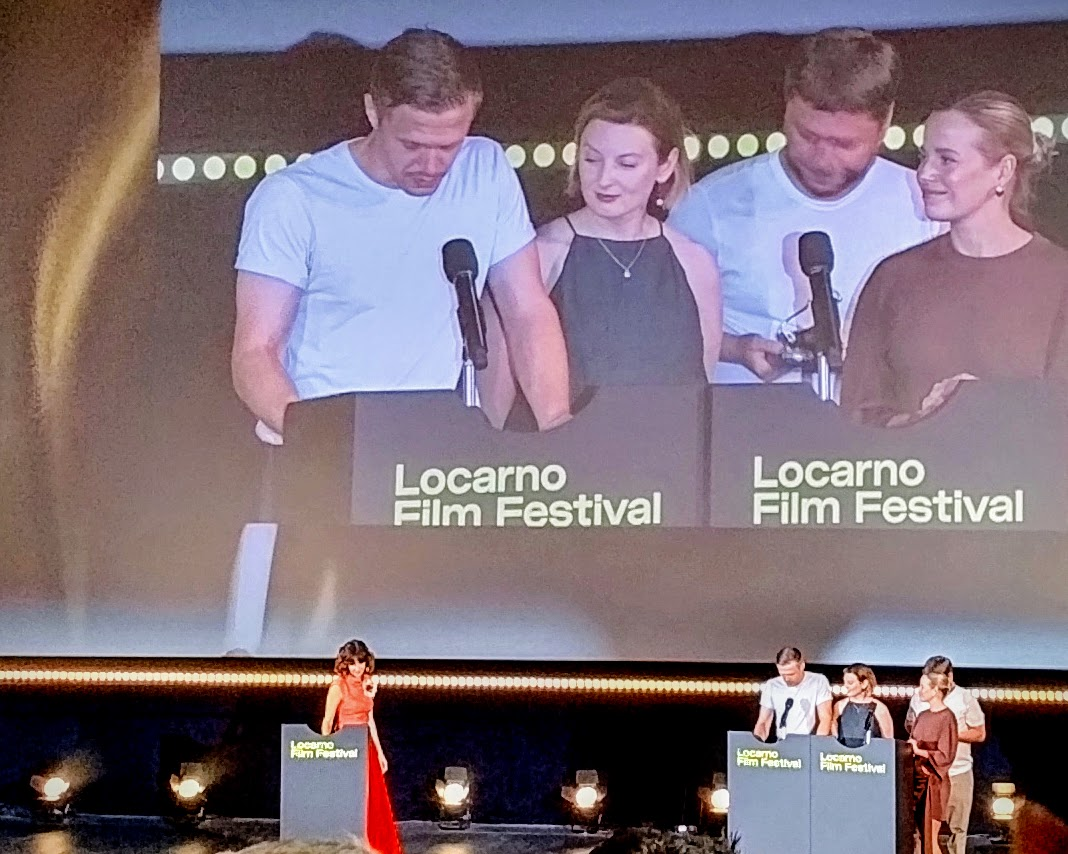
Ensemble members Paulius Markevičius, Agnė Kaktaitė, Giedrius Kiela, und Gelminė Glemžaitė at the 77th Locarno Film Festival

Drowning Dry premiered on 10 August 2024 in the Concorso Internazionale section of the Locarno Film Festival.

== Reception ==
On the review aggregator website Rotten Tomatoes, 85% of 26 critics' reviews are positive. Metacritic, which uses a weighted average, assigned the film a score of 80 out of 100, based on six critics, indicating "generally favorable" reviews.

Sheila O'Malley of RogerEbert.com gave the film three and a half out of four stars and wrote, "Part of the joy of Drowning Dry is watching Bareisa's work, taking note of the choices he makes in shot composition and perspective, his use of mirrors, and—most memorably—repetition. The scenes unfold mostly in one take, and there isn't a 'stock' shot in the whole film. Close-ups are rare. Drowning Dry holds you at arm's length, but I found it more moving—and unsettling—because of that."

=== Accolades ===
Award	Ceremony date	Category	Recipient(s)	Result	Ref.
Locarno Film Festival	17 August 2024	Golden Leopard	Drowning Dry	Nominated	
Locarno Film Festival	17 August 2024	Best Direction Award	Laurynas Bareiša	Won	
Locarno Film Festival	17 August 2024	Best Performance Award	Gelminė Glemžaitė, Agnė Kaktaitė, Giedrius Kiela, Paulius Markevičius	Won	

== See also ==
- List of submissions to the 97th Academy Awards for Best International Feature Film
- List of Lithuanian submissions for the Academy Award for Best International Feature Film
