= Kim Min-hee (actress, born 1982) =

South Korean actress (born 1982)

- 김민희
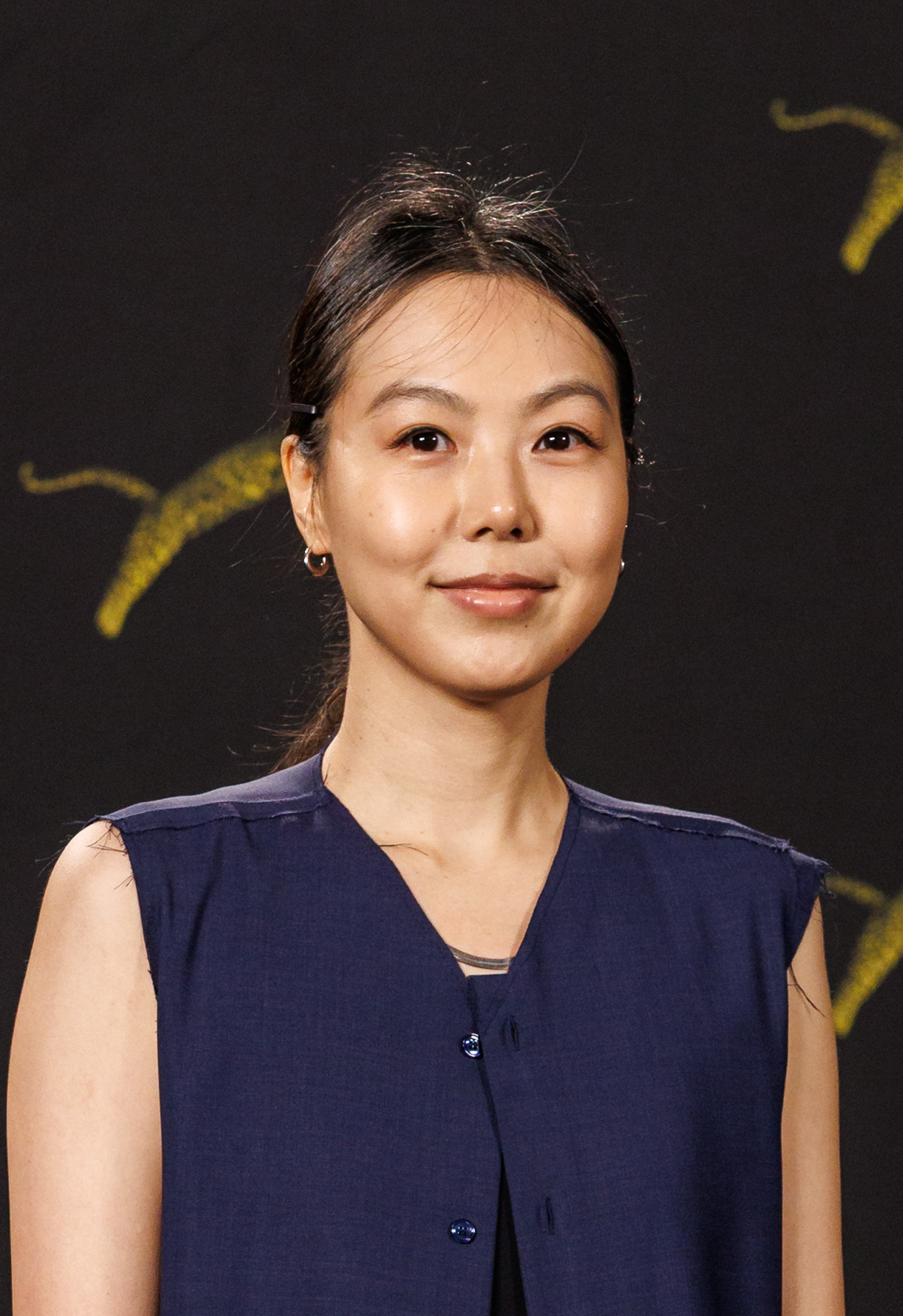
- Kim in 2026
- Born: March 1, 1982 (age 44); Seoul, South Korea
- Education: Dankook University (B.A. and M.A. in Theater and Film Studies)
- Occupations: Actress; model; film producer
- Years active: 1999–present
- Agents: BH Entertainment (until 2012); Management SOOP (2012–2016)
- Partner: Hong Sang-soo (2015–present)
- Children: 1

Korean name
- Hangul: 김민희
- Hanja: 金珉禧
- RR: Gim Minhui
- MR: Kim Minhŭi

Signature
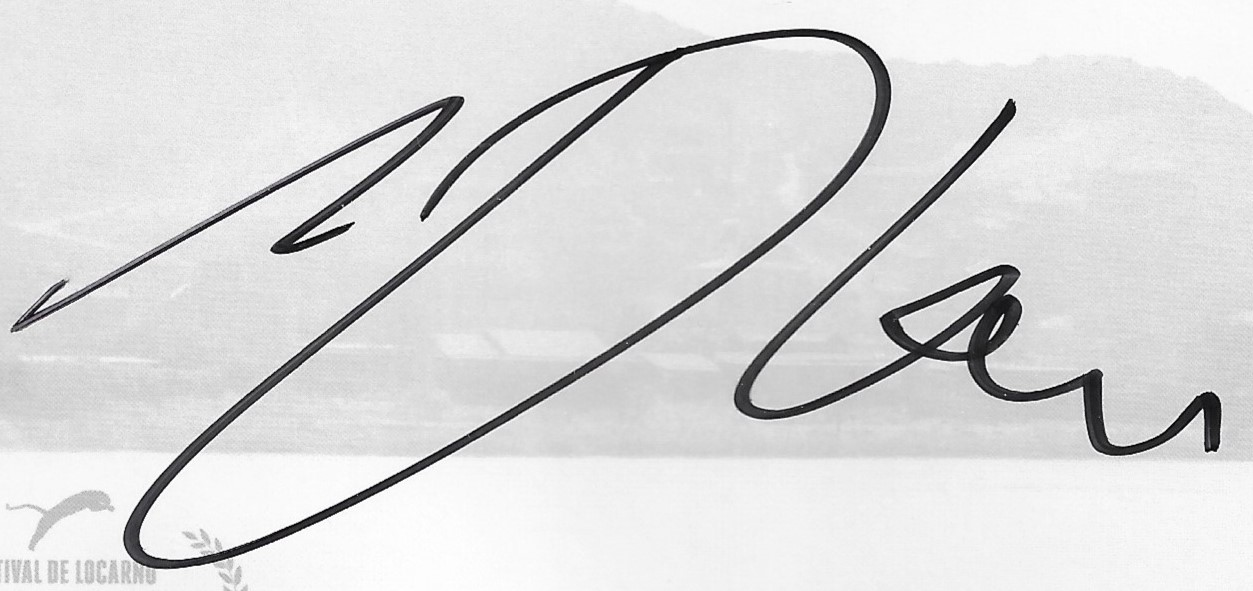

Kim Min-hee (Korean: 김민희; born March 1, 1982) is a South Korean actress and model. She first gained recognition in the films Hellcats (2008), Helpless (2012), and Very Ordinary Couple (2013). Kim rose to international fame for her role as Lady Hideko in Park Chan-wook's 2016 film The Handmaiden. Since then, she has solely acted in the films of her partner, Hong Sang-soo. She won the Silver Bear for Best Actress for her performance in Hong's 2017 film On the Beach at Night Alone, and the Pardo for Best Performance at the 77th Locarno Film Festival in 2024 for her role in Hong's By the Stream and then again for her performance in Hong's Nowhere to Lay My Eyes at the 79th Locarno Film Festival.

In 2020, The New York Times ranked Kim sixteenth on its list of "The 25 Greatest Actors of the 21st Century".

== Career ==
=== 1999: Early career ===
Kim Min-hee began modeling when she was in middle school, and soon appeared as a cover girl in teen magazines. In 1999, she was cast in the campus drama School 2 (1999–2000) as a rebellious high school girl, which launched her to stardom. She became a popular young star at barely 20 years old, appearing in TV dramas and movies. However, a string of poor acting performances brought her negative criticism. Critics and viewers disparagingly called her an "attractive but blank actress," more famous for being a fashion icon and actor Lee Jung-jae's then-girlfriend.

=== 2006–present ===
In 2006, after reading the synopsis of TV series Goodbye Solo, Kim knew that she wanted the role of Mi-ri more than anything, saying "I was ready to do anything to play her." She begged renowned screenwriter Noh Hee-kyung to cast her, and though Noh turned her down five times, Kim would not give up, and her determination eventually convinced Noh to see her hidden potential. Vowing to start over from the bottom, Kim went through strict acting training which included basic vocal and respiratory exercises; she got a hold of the script before anyone else, and continued to analyze the role and practice every day. Kim said that until Goodbye Solo, she hadn't been sure what to do with the rest of her life, but the drama made her feel that acting was her true calling, like she'd "finally opened up the first page of the textbook." She received good reviews for her performance, and despite the drama's low ratings, the role transformed her career.

Her succeeding movie roles helped solidify her career reinvention, beginning with 2008's Hellcats (also known as (Korean: 뜨거운 것이 좋아; lit. '"I Like It Hot" or "Some Like It Hot"'), a light-hearted comedy that explored the lives and loves of three women at different stages of womanhood. Kim played an aspiring screenwriter in her twenties who's agonizing over her insecure career and shaky romance with a deadbeat musician boyfriend. Reviews praised her "compelling performance," and she later won Best Actress at the Baeksang Arts Awards and the Busan Film Critics Awards.

Kim then joined the all-star cast of Actresses (2009), a semi-improvisational mockumentary directed by E J-yong (whom she had previously worked with in Asako in Ruby Shoes). Set during a Vogue Korea photo shoot, Kim gets upset in the film over a remark by a staffer that men don't find skinny women like her attractive, as compared to her more voluptuous costar Kim Ok-vin. A supporting turn as a reporter in conspiracy film Moby Dick followed in 2011.

Kim further stretched the limits of her acting range in psychological thriller Helpless (2012), adapted from Miyabe Miyuki's novel All She Was Worth (in Japanese, "one-way train/fire chariot to hell"). She said she had absolute trust in director Byun Young-joo and never even checked the monitors, and Byun was likewise complimentary, saying, "I ended up adding more scenes for her to act because she was just exceptional. She knew what she was doing, and knew she was able to pull it off. She was rarely nervous throughout the production. She's got no fear and is always confident." Kim said the role gave her a chance to show what she was capable of as an actress, adding, "I feel differently about acting now. I often feel a tremendous sense of achievement and really enjoy doing this job." Displaying a striking screen presence as a mysterious girl who disappears without a trace while her bewildered fiancé discovers a trail of falsified information, Kim received several acting nominations and won Best Actress at the Buil Film Awards.

After her contract with Lee Byung-hun's agency BH Entertainment ended in late 2012, Kim signed with Management SOOP, which also handles the career of her friend Gong Hyo-jin.

In 2013, Kim again earned raves for her performance in Very Ordinary Couple. Unlike the typical romantic comedy, the relationship drama told a more realistic story of an on-and-off couple of three years. During her acceptance speech as Best Actress at the 2013 Baeksang Arts Awards, Kim thanked her costar Lee Min-ki and director Roh Deok, who "helped shape (her) character Young on the screen." Action-noir No Tears for the Dead followed in 2014, in which she played a grieving woman who becomes a hitman's target.

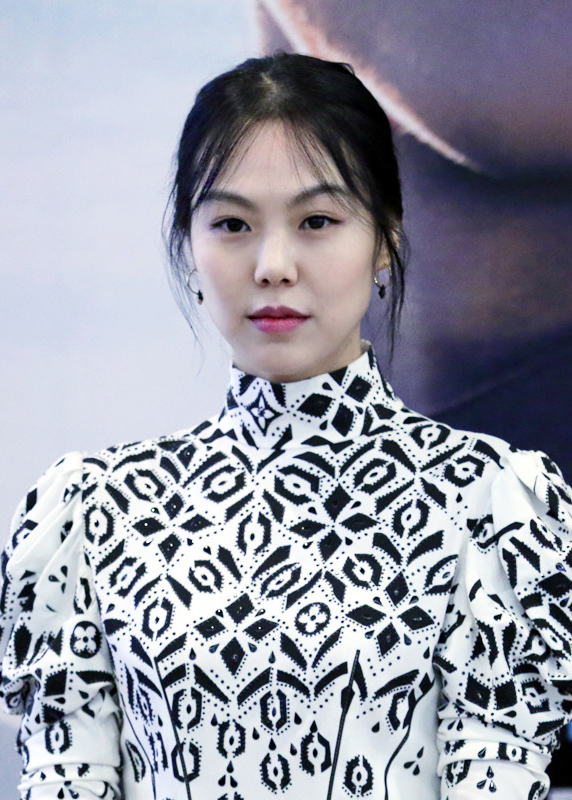
Kim in 2015

Kim next starred in Hong Sang-soo's critically acclaimed film Right Now, Wrong Then (2015), which won her Best Actress at the Busan Film Critics Awards. Kim shot to international stardom for her performance in the award-winning film The Handmaiden, Park Chan-wook's 2016 film adaptation of Fingersmith set in 1930s Korea. Park called her "the most coveted a-list actress at the moment."

In 2017, Kim became the first Korean actress to win the Silver Bear for Best Actress at the Berlin International Film Festival for her performance in the film On the Beach at Night Alone. In 2018, she starred in Grass and Hotel by the River.

Kim starred in The Woman Who Ran (2020) which won the Silver Bear for Best Director at the 70th Berlin International Film Festival. In 2020, The New York Times ranked Kim sixteenth on its list of "The 25 Greatest Actors of the 21st Century".

Kim received the Best Performance Award at the 77th Locarno Film Festival for her role as university acting instructor Jeonim in the 2024 Hong Sang-soo drama By the Stream.

== Personal life ==
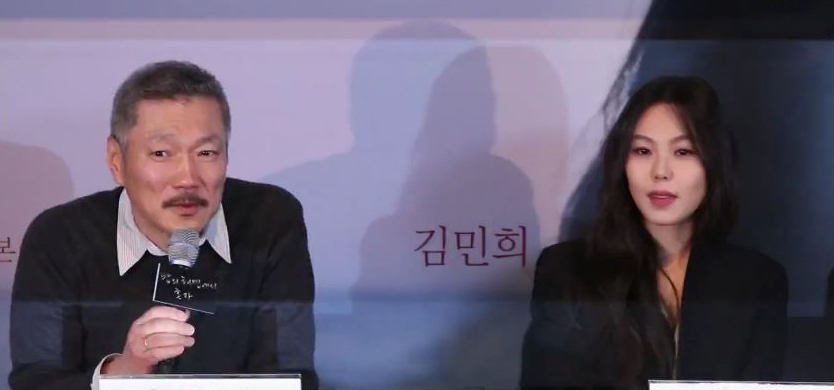
Hong Sang-soo and Kim admitted to their affair at a press conference in Seoul in March 2017.

In June 2016, Kim was reported to be having an affair with Hong Sang-soo, the married director of the film Right Now, Wrong Then, in which she starred as the lead actress in 2015, although it is believed Hong and his wife had been living separately for several years prior and she has rejected his request for a divorce ever since. At the Seoul premiere of On the Beach at Night Alone in March 2017, Kim and Hong openly admitted their affair.

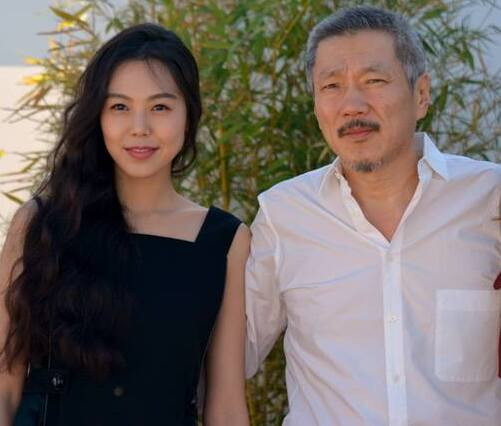
Kim and Hong attending the Cannes Film Festival

The controversy was allegedly the reason why Management SOOP decided not to renew Kim's management contract, which ended in early 2016. She also lost endorsement deals, including that with the cosmetics company Company K, and costume sponsorships, having to pay hundreds of millions of won in advertising penalties. Since then, Kim has been virtually banned from the Korean film industry and has solely appeared in Hong's movies, which are self-produced or co-produced alongside European production companies.

On January 14, 2025, it was reported by news outlets that Kim and Hong were expecting their first child after the two were spotted visiting an obstetrics clinic together. Kim later gave birth to a son on April 8, 2025.

== Filmography ==
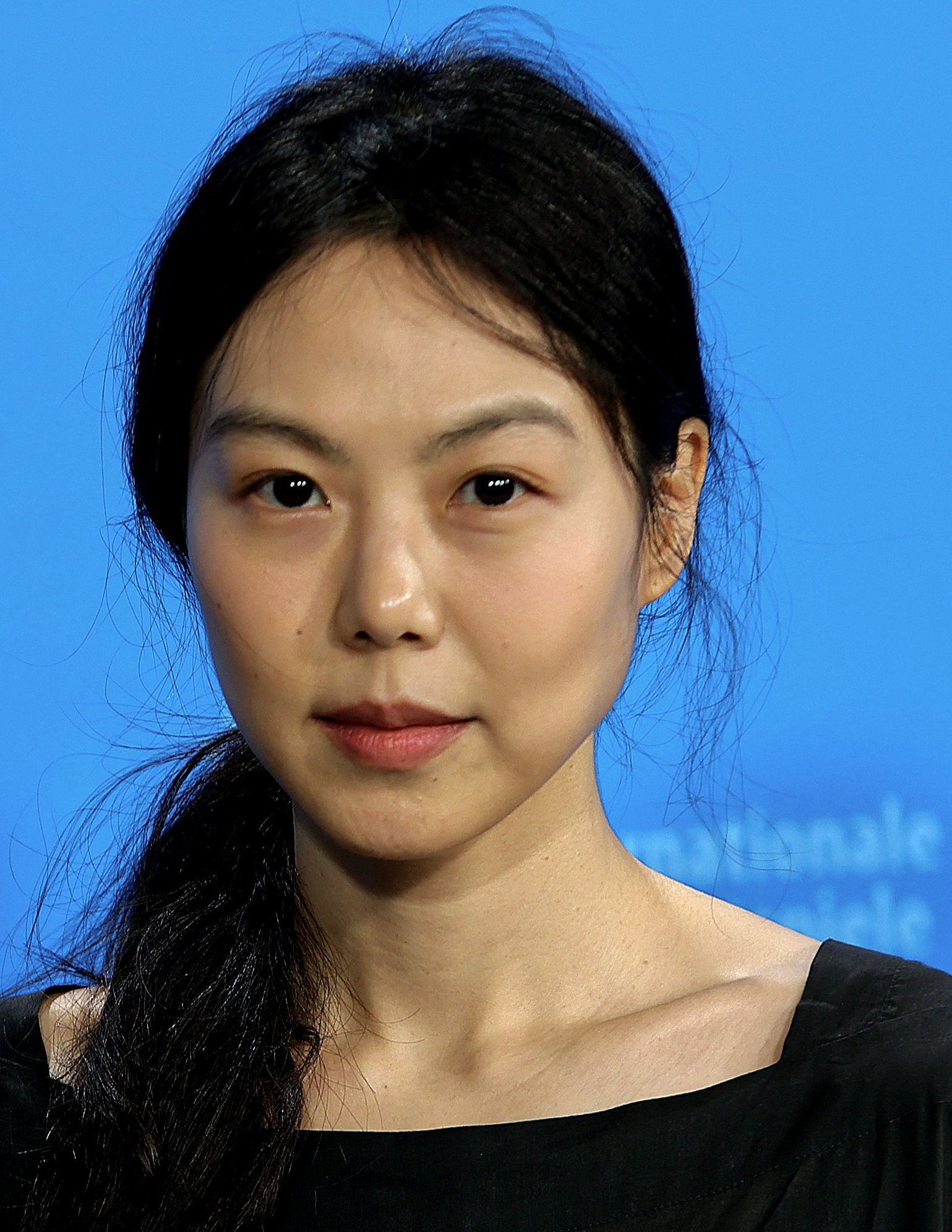
Kim Minhee at Berlinale 2022

=== Film ===
Year	Title	Role	Notes	Ref.
2000	Asako in Ruby Shoes	Mia		
2002	Surprise Party	Hwang Mi-ryung		
2008	Hellcats	Ami		
2009	Actresses	Kim Min-hee		
2011	Moby Dick	Sung Hyo-kwan		
2012	Helpless	Kang Sun-young		
2013	Behind the Camera			
2013	Very Ordinary Couple	Jang Young		
2014	No Tears for the Dead	Mo-kyung		
2015	Right Now, Wrong Then	Yoon Hee-jung		
2016	The Handmaiden	Lady Hideko		
2017	On the Beach at Night Alone	Young-hee		
2017	Claire's Camera	Jeon Man-hee		
2017	The Day After	Song Ah-reum		
2018	Grass	A-reum		
2018	Hotel by the River	A-reum		
2020	The Woman Who Ran	Gam-hee		
2021	Introduction	Painter		
2022	The Novelist's Film	Gil-soo, actress		
2022	Walk Up		Production manager	
2023	In Water			
2023	In Our Day	Sang-won		
2024	By the Stream	Jeonim		
2026	Nowhere to Lay My Eyes	Sang-hee	World premiere at the 79th Locarno Film Festival	

=== Television series ===
Year	Title	Role	Notes	Ref.
1999	School 2	Shin Hye-won		
2000	Look Back in Anger	Lee Hye-jung		
2000	Juliet's Man	Bol Yeo-woo		
2002	Age of Innocence	Ji-yoon		
2004	My 19 Year Old Sister-in-Law	Choi Soo-ji		
2006	Goodbye Solo	Choi Mi-ri		
2008	Love Marriage	Lee Kang-hyun		

=== Television shows ===
Year	Title	Role	Notes	Ref.
2000	Inkigayo	Host	with Ahn Jae-mo, April 23 – December 31, 2000	

== Awards and nominations ==
Name of the award ceremony, year presented, category, nominee of the award, and the result of the nomination
Award ceremony	Year	Category	Nominee / Work	Result	Ref.
Asian Film Awards	2018	Best Actress	The Day After	Nominated	
Austin Film Critics Association	2016	Best Supporting Actress	The Handmaiden	Nominated	
Baeksang Arts Awards	2008	Best Actress – Film	Hellcats	Won	
Baeksang Arts Awards	2012	Best Actress – Film	Helpless	Nominated	
Baeksang Arts Awards	2013	Best Actress – Film	Very Ordinary Couple	Won	
Baeksang Arts Awards	2017	Best Actress – Film	The Handmaiden	Nominated	
Berlin International Film Festival	2017	Best Actress	On the Beach at Night Alone	Won	
Blue Dragon Film Awards	2012	Best Actress	Helpless	Nominated	
Blue Dragon Film Awards	2013	Popular Star Award	Very Ordinary Couple	Won	
Blue Dragon Film Awards	2013	Best Actress	Very Ordinary Couple	Nominated	
Blue Dragon Film Awards	2016	Best Actress	The Handmaiden	Won	
Buil Film Awards	2012	Best Actress	Helpless	Won	
Buil Film Awards	2013	Best Actress	Very Ordinary Couple	Nominated	
Buil Film Awards	2016	Best Actress	The Handmaiden	Nominated	
Buil Film Awards	2017	Best Actress	On the Beach at Night Alone	Nominated	
Busan Film Critics Awards	2008	Best Actress	Hellcats	Won	
Busan Film Critics Awards	2016	Best Actress	Right Now, Wrong Then	Won	
Chunsa Film Art Awards	2016	Best Actress	Right Now, Wrong Then	Nominated	
Chunsa Film Art Awards	2017	Best Actress	The Handmaiden	Nominated	
Chunsa Film Art Awards	2018	Best Actress	On the Beach at Night Alone	Nominated	
Cine21 Awards	2016	Best Actress	The Handmaiden	Won	
Cine21 Awards	2020	Best Actress	The Woman Who Ran	Won	
Director's Cut Awards	2016	Best Actress	The Handmaiden	Won	
Gijón International Film Festival	2017	Best Actress	On the Beach at Night Alone	Won	
Gijón International Film Festival	2024	Best Actress	By the Stream	Won	
Grand Bell Awards	2001	Best Supporting Actress	Asako in Ruby Shoes	Nominated	
International Cinephile Society Awards	2017	Best Actress	The Day After	Won	
International Cinephile Society Awards	2018	Best Actress	On the Beach at Night Alone	Runner-up	
KBS Drama Awards	1999	Best Young Actress	School	Won	
KBS Drama Awards	2006	Best Couple Award	Kim Min-hee (with Lee Jae-ryong); Goodbye Solo	Nominated	
KBS Drama Awards	2006	Excellence Award, Actress	Goodbye Solo	Nominated	
KBS Drama Awards	2008	Best Couple Award	Kim Min-hee (with Kim Ji-hoon); Love Marriage	Nominated	
KBS Drama Awards	2008	Netizen Award, Actress	Love Marriage	Nominated	
KOFRA Film Awards	2013	Best Actress	Helpless	Nominated	
Korean Film Awards	2008	Best Actress	Hellcats	Nominated	
Locarno Film Festival	2024	Best Performance	By the Stream	Won	
Locarno Film Festival	2026	Best Performance	Nowhere to Lay My Eyes	Won	
SBS Drama Awards	2000	Best New Actress	Juliet's Man	Won	
SBS Drama Awards	2002	Netizen Popularity Award	Age of Innocence	Won	
Wildflower Film Awards	2016	Best Actress	Right Now, Wrong Then	Nominated	
Wildflower Film Awards	2018	Best Actress	On the Beach at Night Alone	Nominated	
Wildflower Film Awards	2019	Best Actress	Grass	Nominated	
Wildflower Film Awards	2021	Best Actress	The Woman Who Ran	Nominated	
Women in Film Korea Awards	2013	Best Actress	Very Ordinary Couple	Won	
