= Gianluca Jodice =

Italian film director (born 1973)

- Born: 4 December 1973 (age 51); Naples, Italy
- Occupation: Film director

Gianluca Jodice (born 4 December 1973) is an Italian filmmaker best known for the feature films The Bad Poet and The Flood.

== Early life and education ==
Jodice was born in Naples and graduated with a degree in philosophy from University of Naples Federico II.

== Career ==
After directing a series of award-winning short films throughout the late 1990s and 2000s, Jodice directed the 2014 documentary Searching for the Great Beauty, about the Paolo Sorrentino film The Great Beauty. In 2015, Jodice and Giuseppe Gagliardi co-directed the ten-episode Sky Italia series 1992.

Jodice's 2020 feature film debut, The Bad Poet, dramatized the relationship between Gabriele D'Annunzio and Benito Mussolini through the eyes of Giovanni Comini, a young federal secretary in Fascist Italy. For The Bad Poet, Jodice was nominated in the Best New Director category at the 2021 Nastro d'Argento and 2022 David di Donatello award ceremonies.

The Flood, Jodice's film about Louis XVI and Marie Antoinette at the end of their reign, was selected to open the 77th Locarno Film Festival in August 2024.

== Filmography ==
=== Films ===
Year	English title	Original title	Notes	Ref.
1995	Infinity	L’infinito	Short film	
1998	Rat Meat	Carne di topo	Short film	
2002	Portrait of a Child	Ritratto di bambino	Short film	
2014	Searching for the Great Beauty	Cercando la grande bellezza	Documentary about the Paolo Sorrentino film The Great Beauty	
2020	The Bad Poet	Il cattivo poeta	—	
2024	The Flood	Le Déluge	—	

=== Television ===
Year	Title	Notes	Ref.
2015	1992	Co-directed 10 episodes with Giuseppe Gagliardi	

== Awards and nominations ==
Year	Award	Category	Nominated work	Result	Ref.
2021	Nastro d'Argento	Best New Director	The Bad Poet	Nominated	
2021	Golden Ciak	Best First Feature	The Bad Poet	Nominated	
2022	David di Donatello Award	Best New Director	The Bad Poet	Nominated	
