= Tom Hudson (French actor) =

French actor

Tom Hudson (born 1994) is a French actor, who starred as 'Jeannot' in the French TV series Résistance.

He is the son of Peter Hudson, a British-born actor who has been based in France since at least 1985.

== Filmography ==
- 2013: Malavita
- 2013: Délit de fuite: Loïc
- 2015 : Joséphine, ange gardien : Rémy (1 Episode)
- 2015: Serial Teachers 2
- 2016: Kalinka
- 2018: Kursk
- 2021: The French Dispatch: Actor Playing Mitch-Mitch
- 2024: The Flood
