= Toxic (2024 film) =

2024 film by Saulė Bliuvaitė

- Theatrical release poster
- Lithuanian: Akiplėša
- Directed by: Saulė Bliuvaitė
- Written by: Saulė Bliuvaitė
- Produced by: Giedrė Burokaitė
- Starring: Vesta Matulytė; Ieva Rupeikaitė
- Cinematography: Vytautas Katkus
- Edited by: Ignė Narbutaitė
- Music by: Gediminas Jakubka
- Production company: Akis Bado
- Distributed by: Bendita Film Sales
- Release date: 15 August 2024 (Locarno)
- Running time: 99 minutes
- Country: Lithuania

Toxic (Lithuanian: Akiplėša, lit. 'a bold, shameless person') is a 2024 Lithuanian drama film written and directed by Saulė Bliuvaitė in her feature directorial debut. Starring newcomers Vesta Matulytė and Ieva Rupeikaitė, it tells the story of two 13-year-old girls who attend a modeling school that pushes them to their physical and emotional limits. The film premiered at the 77th Locarno Film Festival, where it won the Golden Leopard.

== Plot ==
13-year-old Marija is spurned by her mother in favor of the latter's lover and is sent to live with her bohemian grandmother in a bleak, unnamed industrial town. Marija is socially withdrawn, targeted by bullies due to her limp. Also living in town is another 13-year-old, the vivacious but temperamental Kristina, who lives with her single father, Šarūnas, a bumbling but loving and supportive blue-collar worker. Kristina steals Marija's designer jeans at the swimming pool, and when Marija finds her wearing them in public, she attacks Kristina to retrieve them, and the two end up brawling. When eventually visiting Kristina's house in a second attempt, the girls end up bonding and become close friends.

The town is home to a modeling agency, and despite Kristina's initial disdain for the practice, the two girls join the program after the instructor's promises that it will allow them to escape the town and travel the world. Though the tall, lean Marija is aesthetically preferred by the agency, her limp causes her to struggle with the physical aspects of modeling. Meanwhile, Kristina, desperate to lose weight, stops eating meals at home and eventually swallows a tapeworm egg she ordered online. The demands of the agency cause the girls to tilt between competitive rivalry and mutually protective friendship, and they even share a kiss. They also spar with some of the other modeling students, some of whom sell sex to older men to afford the school's fees.

The girls at the agency are required to pay for the photoshoots needed to apply for modeling jobs abroad. In order to afford the fee, Kristina at first considers performing sexually acts on the town's older boys, but demurs and instead steals valuables from Šarūnas. Šarūnas, sympathetic, sells his car to support Kristina and encourages her to find the opportunity to leave the town. Marija begs her unseen mother for the money, but her mother becomes alarmed by her modeling attempts and instead tries and fails to take her back home. Marija, out of options, considers performing a massage on a male stranger for payment, but backs out once she and Kristina arrive at his house. An annoyed Kristina decides to do the massage on her behalf, obtaining the money but leaving upset, with it implied that she'd been forced to sexually service the client.

While waiting to submit the payment, Marija overhears an argument between the instructor and the parents of a "graduated" model, which makes it clear that the agency is nothing but a scam, forcing students into predatory contracts that prevent them from making any actual revenue. Her suspicions are confirmed at the actual photoshoot, which is more of a softcore shoot than a legitimate enterprise.

Kristina ends up fleeing the shoot, dangerously nauseous from her tapeworm, which she has failed to expel despite her efforts. Marija leaves the shoot to take her home, where her grandmother helps remove the tapeworm with natural remedies. The film ends with Marija, Kristina, and some other children from the town playing basketball together, still trapped in the bleak environment but at last allowed some innocent play.

== Cast ==
- Vesta Matulytė as Marija
- Ieva Rupeikaitė as Kristina
- Giedrius Savickas as Šarūnas, Kristina's father
- Vilma Raubaitė
- Eglė Gabrėnaitė

== Production ==
Writer and director Saulė Bliuvaitė was inspired by the 2011 documentary film Girl Model, as well as her own experiences as an aspiring model in her youth. She stated, "Through the story of young girls navigating toxic landscapes, I wanted to explore the concept of the human body – the body as a project, currency, an object of desire, the body as a source of pain and magic."

The process of casting the two leads took roughly two years. Filming took place in Kaunas and Vilnius in mid-2023. Bendita Film Sales secured the international distribution rights to the film in July 2024.

== Reception ==
=== Critical response ===
Mariana Hristova of Cineuropa wrote, "It is rare for a film with an even narrative to hold viewers' attention from beginning to end. With Toxic, this happens miraculously, perhaps thanks to the genuine close-up portrayals of both female protagonists – each of whom is a narrative in herself – and the growing affectionate relationship between them." Amber Wilkinson of Screen Daily wrote that the film "benefits from a pair of excellent performances from the young, first-time leads, with [Vesta] Matulytė's more introspective approach dovetailing perfectly with the mercurial energy [Ieva] Rupeikaitė brings to Kristina." Guy Lodge of Variety also commended the performances of Matulytė and Rupeikaitė, calling them "extraordinary".

=== Accolades ===
Award	Year	Category	Recipient(s)	Result	Ref.
Calgary International Film Festival	2024	Best International Feature	Toxic	Nominated	
Chicago International Film Festival	2024	Gold Hugo	Toxic	Nominated	
CinEast	2024	Grand Prix	Toxic	Won	
CinEast	2024	Critics' Prize	Toxic	Won	
El Gouna Film Festival	2024	Golden Star	Toxic	Nominated	
European Film Awards	2024	European Discovery	Toxic	Nominated	
Festival du nouveau cinéma	2024	Louve d'Or	Toxic	Won	
International Film Festival of India	2024	Best Film	Toxic	Won	
International Film Festival of India	2024	Best Actor (Female)	Vesta Matulytė and Ieva Rupeikaitė	Won	
La Roche-sur-Yon International Film Festival	2024	Prix Nouvelles Vagues Acuitis	Toxic	Nominated	
Ljubljana International Film Festival	2024	Kingfisher Award	Toxic	Nominated	
Locarno Film Festival	2024	Golden Leopard	Toxic	Won	
Locarno Film Festival	2024	First Feature Award	Toxic	Won	
Locarno Film Festival	2024	Ecumenical Jury Prize	Toxic	Won	
Manaki Brothers Film Festival	2024	European Lo-cap Film Competition Award	Vytautas Katkus	Won	
Molodist International Film Festival	2024	Scythian Deer	Toxic	Nominated	
QCinema International Film Festival	2024	New Horizons Prize for Best First Film	Toxic	Won	
Reykjavík International Film Festival	2024	Golden Puffin	Toxic	Nominated	
Stockholm International Film Festival	2024	Bronze Horse	Toxic	Nominated	
Valladolid International Film Festival	2024	Punto de Encuentro Award	Toxic	Nominated	
Valladolid International Film Festival	2024	Seminci Joven Award	Toxic	Nominated	
Warsaw Film Festival	2024	Crème de la Crème Award	Toxic	Nominated	
