= Kwon Hae-hyo =

South Korean actor and activist

- Kwon in 2026
- Born: November 6, 1965 (age 61); Seoul, South Korea
- Education: Hanyang University (Theater and Film)
- Occupations: Actor; activist
- Years active: 1990–present
- Spouse: Cho Yun-hee (m. 1994)
- Children: 2

Korean name
- Hangul: 권해효
- Hanja: 權海驍
- RR: Gwon Haehyo
- MR: Kwŏn Haehyo

Kwon Hae-hyo (Korean: 권해효; born November 6, 1965) is a South Korean actor and activist. In addition to his acting career, he is also known for his activism. Kwon has been involved with a number of organizations advocating for political and social justice causes, including the Unite Our People Movement Headquarters, the Abolish the Family Registry and Create Family Equality Organization, the Cultural Alliance for Peace at Daechuri, and the Minkahyup Human Rights Group.

== Filmography ==
=== Film ===
Year	Title	Role	Notes	Ref.
1992	Myong-ja Akiko Sonia			
1994	Out to the World			
1994	The Fox with Nine Tails			
1994	Rules of the Game	Lee Ki-ri		
1996	The Real Man	Man		
1996	Ghost Mamma	Byun Joo-ho		
1997	Change	Sub-foreman	Bit part	
1998	Tie a Yellow Ribbon	Bo-sung		
1999	My Computer	Detective	Short film	
1999	A+ Life	Ji-seok		
2001	A Day	Baby store manager	Cameo	
2001	Last Present	Hak-soo		
2001	This Is Law		Cameo	
2002	The Beauty in Dream	Doctor	Cameo	
2002	Family	Prosecutor Choi		
2009	Ochetuji Diary	Narrator		
2010	One Night Stand	Narrator ("Third Night")		
2010	Hearty Paws 2	Bong-gu		
2010	Cyrano Agency	President Kwon	Cameo	
2011	Never Say I Can't	Himself	Cameo	
2012	Never Ending Story	Doctor		
2012	In Another Country	Jong-soo		
2012	Two Weddings and a Funeral	Senior colleague doctor	Cameo	
2012	Perfect Number	Police team leader		
2013	Happiness for Sale	Section chief, Kang Mi-na's boss	Cameo	
2013	Killer Toon	Jo Seon-gi		
2013	The Fake	Choi Gyeong-seok	Voice	
2014	Hot Young Bloods	Kang Dae-pan		
2014	Venus Talk	Representative Park		
2014	Whistle Blower	General manager of broadcasting station	Cameo	
2015	C'est Si Bon	Kim Choon-sik		
2015	Strangers on the Field	Documentary narrator		
2015	Minority Opinion	Judge		
2016	Vanishing Time: A Boy Who Returned	Baek-gi		
2016	Split	CEO Baek		
2016	Yourself and Yours	Park Jae-young		
2016	Remember You	Park Kyoung-joon		
2017	On the Beach at Night Alone	Chun-woo		
2017	Lucid Dream	Director Park	Cameo	
2017	The Day After	Kim Bong-wan		
2018	The Vanished	Police chief	Special appearance	
2018	Goodbye My Father			
2019	Juror 8	President of the Court		
2019	Tazza: One Eyed Jack	Mr. Kwon		
2020	The Woman Who Ran	Mr. Jung		
2020	Fukuoka	Hae-hyo		
2020	Peninsula	Elder Kim		
2021	Whispering Corridors 6: The Humming	Bae Gwang-mo		
2021	The Cursed: Dead Man's Prey	Lee Sang-in		
2021	In Front of Your Face	Jae-Won		
2021	Taeil	Hanmi-sa president	Animated Film	
2022	The Novelist's Film			
2022	Hommage	Ji-wan's husband		
2022	Walk Up	Byung-soo		
2024	Bogota: City of the Lost	Sergeant Park Jang-soo		
2024	By the Stream	Sieon		
2025	What Does That Nature Say to You	Kim Oryeong		
2025	The Ugly	Lim Yeong-gyu		
2026	Nowhere to Lay My Eyes			

=== Television series ===
Year	Title	Role	Notes	Ref.
1993	The Faraway Ssongba River	Private first class Sung Han-soo		
1994	Love Is in Your Arms			
1994	Two Detectives	Heo Geun-bal		
1995	Good Man, Good Woman	Min-ho		
1996	Reporting for Duty	Private first class Chu Jae-sik		
1996	Three Guys and Three Girls	Cafe owner Kwon Hae-hyo		
1997	OK Ranch	Pilot instructor		
1997	Revenge and Passion	Jang Dong-wook		
1998	Eun-shil	Jang Nak-cheon		
1998	Mister Q	Go Kwang-ryul		
1999	Did You Ever Love?	Lee Kang-jae		
1999	Beautiful Secret	Kang-pyo		
2000	Popcorn	Oh Dong-seok		
2000	MBC Best Theater "Brushing Against; Each Other in the Elevator"			
2001	Well Known Woman	Park In-sang		
2001	Orient Theatre	Im Sung-kyu		
2001	Man of Autumn	Choi Tae-sik		
2002	Winter Sonata	Senior colleague Kim		
2002	Successful Story of a Bright Girl	Joo Soo-bong		
2002	Reservation for Love	Jang Seung-won		
2002	To Be with You	Lee Ji-won		
2003	My Fair Lady	Go Hyun-tak		
2003	Pretty Woman	Kang Hyun-jae		
2004	Dog Bowl	Joong-tae		
2004	Forbidden Love	Detective Moon		
2005	Drama City "Chin Up, Dad! "	Kim Bong-soo		
2005	My Love Toram	Yeom Dong-ho		
2005	Drama City "Merry Mr. Yoo Pil-man"	Kim Bong-soo		
2005	My Lovely Sam Soon	Lee Hyun-moo		
2005	I Love You, My Enemy	Kwon Dal-pyung		
2005	My Rosy Life	Chun Won-man		
2006	Thank You, My Life	Kim Ki-ho		
2006	A Farewell to Arms	Chun Man-seok		
2006	Please Come Back, Soon-ae	Han Hyun-jong		
2006	What's Up Fox	Hwang Yong-kil		
2007	Dear Lover	Park Kwang		
2007	Air City	Min Byung-kwan		
2007	Golden Bride	Cha Byuk-soo		
2007	MBC Best Theater "Bong-jae Returns"	Park Jung-hee		
2008	Daebak Life	Yoo Gwi-chul		
2008	Kokkiri (Elephant)	Guk Young-soo		
2008	Who Are You?	Funeral service counselor		
2009	Cain and Abel	Kim Jin-geun		
2009	The Last Report About; Cardinal Stephen Kim Sou-hwan	Father Gong		
2010	Jejungwon	Oh Chung-hwan		
2010	Ang Shim Jung	Yoon Geuk-geom		
2010	Thank You for Making Me Smile			
2010	Chonticom Welcome to Stingray		Cameo	
2011	Believe in Love	Kwon Ki-chang		
2011	Lie to Me	Hwang Seok-bong		
2012	Dream High 2	Joo Jung-wan		
2012	Phantom	Han Young-seok		
2012	The King of Dramas	Na Woon-hyung		
2013	Goddess of Marriage	Noh Jang-soo		
2014	Angel Eyes	Kim Woo-chul		
2014	Big Man	Gu Deok-gyu		
2014	My Spring Days	Lee Hyuk-soo		
2014	Secret Door	Seo Gyun		
2015	My Heart Twinkle Twinkle	Dal-Gwan		
2015	Second 20s		Cameo (Episode 7)	
2016	Riders: Catch Tomorrow		Cameo	
2016	Entertainer	Entertainment Bureau director		
2016	Don't Dare to Dream	Oh Jong-Hwan		
2017	Radiant Office	Park Sang Man		
2017	Girls' Generation 1979	Jeong-hee's father		
2019	The Crowned Clown	Sin Chi-soo		
2019	Search: WWW	Min Hong-joo		
2020	Nobody Knows	Jang Gi-ho		
2021	Undercover	Oh Pil-jae		
2021	D.P.	Ahn Jun-ho's Father	Cameo	
2022	Forecasting Love and Weather	Ko Bong-chan		
2022	Glitch		Cameo	
2022	Under the Queen's Umbrella	Master Toji		
2023	Vigilante (TV series)	Professor Lee Joon-Yeob		
2024	Flex X Cop	Lee Hyung-jun		
2024	Wedding Impossible	Hyun Dae-Ho		
2024	Parasyte: The Grey	Kim Chul-Min		
2024	Bitter Sweet Hell	Choi Go-Myeon		
2024	Black Out	Hyun Gu-tak		
TBA	Who Is She	Mr. Park		

=== Variety shows ===
Year	Title	Role
1995	Go to the World of Pungmul Travel	
1999	It's a Good Morning for a Live Broadcast	
1999	TV Love on the Air	
2002	Cine Port	
2010	MBC Prime: "The Face of a Good Company" CSR	Documentary narrator

=== Hosting ===
Year	Title	Notes	Ref.
2021	22nd Jeonju International Fantastic Film Festival	with Park Ha-sun	
2022	Opening ceremony 2022 Seoul Independent Film Festival		

== Theater ==
Year	Title	Role	Reprised	Ref.
1990	The Good Person of Szechwan			
—N/a	Subway Line 1			
—N/a	Come and See Me			
—N/a	Taxi Driver	Deok-bae		
1994	True West			
2004	Art	Kyu-tae	2005, 2008	
2010	The Pitmen Painters	Lyon		
2010	Love Letters	Andy	2012–2013	
2011	Mongdang Pencil	Narrator		
2012	Seoul Notes			

== Accolades ==
=== Awards and nominations ===
Year	Award	Category	Nominated work	Result
1998	SBS Drama Awards	Best Supporting Actor	Mister Q, Eun-shil	Won
2006	KBS Drama Awards	Best Actor in a One-Act/Special/Short Drama	A Farewell to Arms	Nominated
2011	10th Future Female Leaders Awards	Special Award	—N/a	Won
2017	26th Buil Film Awards	Best Actor	The Day After	Nominated
2017	18th Busan Film Critics Awards	Best Actor	The Day After	Won
2019	13th Asian Film Awards	Best Supporting Actor	Hotel by the River	Nominated
2022	31st Buil Film Awards	Best Supporting Actor	Hommage	Nominated
2023	10th Wildflower Film Awards	Best Actor	Walk Up	Nominated
2025	46th Blue Dragon Film Awards	Best Supporting Actor	The Ugly	Nominated
2025	12th Korean Film Producers Association Awards	Best Supporting Actor	Bogota: City of the Lost	Won
2025	29th Chunsa Film Art Awards	Best Supporting Actor	The Ugly	Won
2026	13th Wildflower Film Awards	Best Actor	The Ugly	Won

=== Listicles ===
Name of publisher, year listed, name of listicle, and placement
Publisher	Year	Listicle	Placement	Ref.
Korean Film Council	2021	Korean Actors 200 (Note: Introduces 200 actors that best represent the present and future of Korean cinema to the people in the film industry all over the world.)	Included	
