= War (2014 film) =

2014 film

- Film poster
- German: Chrieg
- Directed by: Simon Jaquemet
- Written by: Simon Jaquemet
- Produced by: Christian Davi; Christof Neracher; Thomas Thümena
- Starring: Benjamin Lutzke; Ella Rumpf; Sascha Gisler
- Cinematography: Lorenz Merz
- Edited by: Christof Schertenleib
- Production companies: Hugofilm Productions GmbH; SRF Schweizer Radio und Fernsehen
- Distributed by: Déjà-vu Film; Outside the Box
- Release date: September 2014
- Running time: 110 minutes
- Country: Switzerland
- Language: Swiss German

War (German: Chrieg) is a 2014 Swiss drama film directed by Simon Jaquemet about a teenage boy sent to a remote alpine farm. It won awards including the Jury Prize at the 2014 Marrakech International Film Festival, the Max Ophüls Preis in 2015, and the Swiss Film Award for Best Cinematography.

== Synopsis ==
Matteo is a 15-year-old boy with no friends whose attempts to win his father’s respect are unsuccessful. One night, he is taken from his bed and sent by his parents to spend the summer working on a remote alpine farm under the supervision of a farming family. When he arrives in the mountains, however, he finds that three other teenagers have overpowered their supervisor. After being humiliated and forced to undergo a test of courage, Matteo is gradually accepted by the group, whose acts of violence increasingly turn against adults, including their own parents.

== Cast ==
The cast includes:

- Benjamin Lutzke as Matteo
- Ella Rumpf as Ali
- Sascha Gisler as Dion
- John Leuppi as Matteo's father
- Livia S. Reinhard as Matteo's mother
- Ernst C. Sigrist as Hanspeter
- Patric Gehrig as Stefan

== Reception ==
=== Awards and nominations ===
War won awards including the Jury Prize and Best Performance by an Actor at the 2014 Marrakech International Film Festival, the Max Ophüls Preis at the 2015 Filmfestival Max Ophüls Preis, and the Preis des Landes Südtirol für den besten Spielfilm im Wettbewerb at the 2015 Bozner Filmtage. At the 2015 Swiss Film Awards, it won Best Cinematography and received nominations for Best Fiction Film, Best Actor, Best Film Editing, and Best Performance in a Supporting Role.

The film was one of seven films shortlisted by Switzerland for the Academy Award for Best Foreign Language Film at the 88th Academy Awards, but Iraqi Odyssey was selected as the Swiss submission.

=== Critical response ===
Filmdienst described the film as a visually striking youth drama that gives considerable space to the anger of its young characters and portrays their destructive group dynamics with harsh intensity. The Hollywood Reporter wrote that it had "a drive and intensity" in its first half, though it found the later part of the film more predictable.

== Festival screenings ==
The film premiered in September 2014. It was later screened at festivals including the 2015 Raindance Film Festival, the 2015 Montreal World Film Festival, the 2015 Kyiv International Film Festival Molodist, and the 2015 Cologne Conference.
