= Saulė Bliuvaitė =

Lithuanian film director and screenwriter (born 1994)

- Born: October 4, 1994; Kaunas, Lithuania
- Education: Lithuanian Academy of Music and Theatre (LMTA)
- Occupations: Film director, screenwriter

Saulė Bliuvaitė (born 1994) is a Lithuanian film director and screenwriter. For her feature film debut Toxic (2024), she won the Golden Leopard at the Locarno Film Festival.

== Early life and education ==
Bliuvaitė studied film directing at the Lithuanian Academy of Music and Theatre (LMTA) in Vilnius. During this time, she made four short films that were shown at Lithuanian and foreign film festivals. She graduated in 2018 with a bachelor's degree.

== Career ==
In 2019, Bliuvaitė was involved as co-author and editor of the historical feature film Isaac by Jurgis Matulevičius. The work was nominated for the European Film Award and was Lithuania's contribution to a 2022 Oscar nomination in the Best International Feature Film. For Limousine (2021), Bliuvaitė won awards at the German film festival GoEast and the Warsaw Film Festival. The 15-minute documentary short film shows a wide variety of groups of people desperately searching for entertainment in a limousine of the same name.

Bliuvaitė's international breakthrough was her feature film debut Toxic (2024). The drama is about two 13-year-old girls who want to escape their desolate and hopeless Lithuanian hometown. To do so, they push their bodies to the limit in a modeling school. The screenplay for the film is based on Bliuvaitė's own experiences as a teenager. Toxic was invited to the international competition of the 77th Locarno Film Festival. There, the film was awarded the main prize, the Golden Leopard, by the jury led by Austrian Jessica Hausner. Other awards for Bliuvaitė included the Swatch First Feature Award for Best Feature Film Debut and the Prize of the Ecumenical Jury.

== Filmography ==
Short film

| Year | Title | Director | Writer | Editor | Notes |
|---|---|---|---|---|---|
| 2016 | Life Is Beautiful and Neverending (Gyvenimas yra grazus ir niekada nesibaigia) | Yes | Yes | Yes | |
| 2017 | Yana | Yes | Yes | Yes | |
| 2019 | The Contest | Yes | Yes | Yes | |
| 2021 | Limousine | Yes | Yes | Yes | Documentary short |

Feature film

| Year | Title | Director | Writer | Producer |
|---|---|---|---|---|
| 2024 | Toxic | Yes | Yes | No |

== Awards and nominations ==
| Year | Award | Category | Title | Result | Ref. |
|---|---|---|---|---|---|
| 2021 | GoEast | RheinMain Short Film Prize | Limousine | Won | |
| 2021 | Warsaw Film Festival | Best Documentary Short Film | Limousine | Won | |
| 2024 | Locarno Film Festival | Golden Leopard | Toxic | Won | |
| 2024 | Locarno Film Festival | Swatch First Feature Award | Toxic | Won | |
| 2024 | Locarno Film Festival | Prize of the Ecumenical Jury | Toxic | Won | |
