= The Innocent (2018 film) =

2018 film

- Film poster
- German: Der Unschuldige
- Directed by: Simon Jaquemet
- Written by: Simon Jaquemet
- Produced by: Tolga Dilsiz; Aurelius Eisenreich
- Starring: Judith Hofmann; Naomi Scheiber; Thomas Schuepbach
- Cinematography: Gabriel Sandru
- Edited by: Christof Schertenleib
- Production companies: 8horses GmbH; Augenschein Filmproduktion GmbH; ZDF Zweites Deutsches Fernsehen; SRF Schweizer Radio und Fernsehen; ARTE; Teleclub AG
- Distributed by: Ascot Elite Entertainment (Switzerland); Film Kino Text (Germany)
- Release date: 9 September 2018 (TIFF)
- Running time: 114 minutes
- Countries: Switzerland; Germany
- Language: Swiss German

The Innocent (German: Der Unschuldige) is a 2018 Swiss-German drama film written and directed by Simon Jaquemet. It stars Judith Hofmann as Ruth, whose life is disrupted by the return of her former lover. The film had its world premiere in the Platform section at the 2018 Toronto International Film Festival, and Hofmann later won Best Actress at the 2019 Swiss Film Awards.

== Synopsis ==
Ruth is a devout Christian who works in neuroscience. When her former lover reappears after twenty years in prison, her sense of reality begins to unravel.

== Cast ==
The cast includes:

- Judith Hofmann as Ruth
- Naomi Scheiber as Naomi
- Christian Kaiser as Hanspeter
- Thomas Schüpbach as Andreas
- Anna Tenta as Meike
- Urs-Peter Wolters as Paul

== Production ==
Jaquemet said the film was inspired by a television report about a woman who continued to believe in her fiancé’s innocence after he had been sentenced to life imprisonment. He also said that a dream later helped shape the project.

== Reception ==
=== Awards ===
At the 2019 Swiss Film Awards, the film was nominated for Best Fiction Film and Best Cinematography. Judith Hofmann won Best Actress, and Simon Jaquemet was nominated for Best Screenplay.

=== Critical response ===
The Hollywood Reporter described the film as ambitious and well performed, but considered it a letdown and criticised it as messily told. The review also praised Judith Hofmann’s performance, while arguing that the film left too much open to interpretation and did not fully develop its characters.

Variety described the film as a coolly intellectual drama and praised Judith Hofmann’s performance. The review said it unfolds like a slow-motion thriller, while suggesting it was only partly successful in placing the audience in Ruth’s perspective.

Filmdienst described the film as a drama told in the style of magical realism, centred on faith, delusion, and reality. The review praised Judith Hofmann’s lead performance and rated the film as worth seeing.

== Festival screenings ==
The film had its world premiere in the Platform section at the 2018 Toronto International Film Festival. In 2019, it was screened at festivals including the Jeonju International Film Festival, the Seattle International Film Festival, the Neuchâtel International Fantastic Film Festival, the Locarno Film Festival, and the Haifa International Film Festival. In 2021, it was screened at the Kaohsiung Film Festival.
