= 77th Locarno Film Festival =

Film festival in Locarno, Switzerland

- Official poster of the 77th Locarno Film Festival featuring a photograph by Annie Leibovitz
- Opening film: The Flood
- Location: Locarno, Switzerland
- Founded: 1946
- Awards: Golden Leopard: Toxic
- Hosted by: Associazione Festival del film Locarno
- Artistic director: Giona A. Nazzaro
- Festival date: Opening: 7 August 2024; Closing: 17 August 2024
- Website: Locarno Film Festival

Locarno Film Festival
- 78th 76th

The 77th Locarno Film Festival was held from 7 August to 17 August 2024. The Crowd by King Vidor, accompanied by live music from the Orchestra della Svizzera Italiana, screened the night before the festival began, and The Flood by Gianluca Jodice opened the festival.

Austrian filmmaker Jessica Hausner served as the jury president for the main competition. Additional jury members were announced in July 2024.

Lithuanian film Toxic, directed by Saulė Bliuvaitė, was the winner of the Golden Leopard, the festival's main prize. Kurdwin Ayub's Moon was the winner of the Special Jury Prize. Kim Min-hee was awarded the Best Performance prize for her role in By the Stream.

== Juries ==
=== Concorso Internazionale - Main Competition ===
- Jessica Hausner, Austrian filmmaker – Jury President
- Diana Elbaum, Belgian film producer
- Payal Kapadia, Indian filmmaker
- Luca Marinelli, Italian actor
- Tim Blake Nelson, American filmmaker

=== Concorso Cineasti del Presente - Filmmakers of the Present Competition ===
- C.J. Obasi, Nigerian filmmaker
- Lina Soualem, French-Palestinian-Algerian filmmaker
- Charles Tesson, French film critic

=== Pardi di Domani - Short Film Competition ===
- Licia Eminenti, Italian filmmaker and film programmer
- Laza Razanajatovo, Malagasy filmmaker and film curator
- Juliette Schrameck, French film producer

=== First Feature Competition ===
- Khalil Benkirane, Moroccan filmmaker
- Alma Pöysti, Finnish actress
- Esmé Sciaroni, Swiss-Italian makeup designer

=== Pardo Verde Competition ===
- Kantarama Gahigiri, Swiss-Rwandan artist and filmmaker
- Cédric Succivalli, French film programmer and critic
- Daniel Wiener, Swiss sustainability adviser, journalist, and arts manager

=== Independent Juries ===
==== Ecumenical Jury ====
- Douglas P. Fahleson, Ireland
- Dirk von Jutrczenka
- María Teresa Téramo
- Anita Uzulniece

==== Premio FIPRESCI - FIPRESCI Award ====
- Johannes Hagman
- Antonis Lagarias
- Gerhard Midding
- Silvia Posavec
- Mariola Wiktor

==== Europa Cinemas Label ====
- Ramiro Ledo Cordeiro
- Camelia Popa
- Mila Schlingemann
- Marvin Wiechert

==== Grand Prix Semaine de la Critique – Prix SRG SSR 2024 - Critics' Week Grand Prize ====
- Madeleine Hirsiger
- Charles Martig
- Cristina Trezzini

== Official sections ==
=== Piazza Grande ===
The following films were selected to be screened at the Piazza Grande, Locarno's open-air theater that accommodates a nightly audience of up to 8,000 people:

English Title	Original Title	Director(s)	Production Country
Dog on Trial	Le Procès du chien	Laetitia Dosch	Switzerland, France
Electric Child		Simon Jaquemet	Switzerland
The Fall (2006)		Tarsem Singh	United States, India
The Flood	Le Déluge	Gianluca Jodice	Italy, France
Gaucho Gaucho		Michael Dweck, Gregory Kershaw	United States, Argentina
Mexico 86		César Díaz	France, Belgium, Mexico
Reinas		Klaudia Reynicke	Switzerland, Peru, Spain
Savages	Sauvages	Claude Barras	Switzerland, France, Belgium
Rita		Paz Vega	Spain
The Piano (1993)		Jane Campion	New Zealand
The Seed of the Sacred Fig	دانه‌ی انجیر معابد	Mohammad Rasoulof	Iran, Germany, France
Sew Torn		Freddy Macdonald	United States, Switzerland
Shambhala		Min Bahadur Bham	Nepal, France, Norway, Hong Kong, China, Turkey, Taiwan, United States, Qatar
Timestalker		Alice Lowe	United Kingdom
A Woman Is a Woman (1961)	Une femme est une femme	Jean-Luc Godard	France
Piazza Grande: Pre-festival
E.T. the Extra-Terrestrial (1982)		Steven Spielberg	United States
Fiore Mio		Paolo Cognetti	Italy, Belgium

=== Main Competition (Concorso Internazionale) ===
The Concorso Internazionale, the main section of the Locarno Film Festival, features new works in competition for the Golden Leopard.

English Title	Original Title	Director(s)	Production Country
100,000,000,000,000	Cent mille milliards	Virgil Vernier	France
Agora		Ala Eddine Sim	Tunisia, France, Saudi Arabia, Qatar
Bogancloch		Ben Rivers	United Kingdom, Germany, Iceland
By the Stream	수유천	Hong Sang-soo	South Korea
Death Will Come	La Mort viendra	Christoph Hochhäusler	Germany, Luxembourg, Belgium
Drowning Dry	Seses	Laurynas Bareiša	Lithuania
Fire of Wind	Fogo do Vento	Marta Mateus	Portugal, Switzerland, France
Green Line		Sylvie Ballyot	France, Lebanon, Qatar
Luce		Silvia Luzi, Luca Bellino	Italy
Moon	Mond	Kurdwin Ayub	Austria
New Dawn Fades	Yeni șafak solarken	Gürcan Keltek	Turkey, Italy, Germany, Norway, Netherlands
Salve Maria		Mar Coll	Spain
The Sparrow in the Chimney	Der Spatz im Kamin	Ramon Zürcher	Switzerland
Transamazonia		Pia Marais	France, Germany, Switzerland, Taiwan, Brazil
Toxic	Akiplėša	Saulė Bliuvaitė	Lithuania
Weightless	Sulla terra leggeri	Sara Fgaier	Italy
Youth (Hard Times)	青春（苦）	Wang Bing	France, Luxembourg, Netherlands

=== Out of Competition (Fuori Concorso) ===
The Fuori Concorso section highlights works that challenge the conventions of narrative filmmaking.

English Title	Original Title	Director(s)	Production Country
Bang Bang		Vincent Granshaw	United States
Dragon Dilatation		Bertrand Mandico	France
Eight Postcards from Utopia	Opt Ilustrate Din Lumea Ideală	Radu Jude, Christian Ferencz-Flatz	Romania
Endangered Species	Espèce Menacée	Bruno Deville	Switzerland
Fréwaka		Aislinn Clarke	Ireland
Ma Famille Chérie		Isild Le Besco	France
La Passion Selon Béatrice		Fabrice Du Welz	Belgium, France
La Prodigiosa Trasformazione Della Classe Operaia in Stranieri		Samir	Switzerland, Italy
Sleep #2		Radu Jude	Romania
Telepathic Letters	Cartas Telepáticas	Edgar Pêra	Portugal
The Life Apart	La vita accanto	Marco Tullio Giordana	Italy

=== Filmmakers of the Present Competition (Concorso Cineasti del Presente) ===
The Concorso Cineasti del Presente, also known as the Filmmakers of the Present Competition, showcases first and second feature films from emerging filmmakers.

English Title	Original Title	Director(s)	Production Country
Crickets, It's Your Turn		Olga Korotko	France, Kazakhstan
Der Fleck		Willy Hans	Germany, Switzerland
Fario		Lucie Prost	France
Four Evil Deeds		Richard Hunter	United Kingdom
Hanami		Denise Fernandes	Switzerland, Portugal, Cape Verde
Holy Electricity		Tato Kotetishvili	Georgia, Netherlands
Invention		Courtney Stephens	United States
Joqtau		Aruan Anartay	Kazakhstan
Lesson Learned	Fekete Pont	Bálint Szimler	Hungary
Listen to the Voices	Kouté Vwa	Maxime Jean-Baptiste	France, French Guiana
Monólogo Colectivo		Jessica Sarah Rinland	Argentina, United Kingdom
Olivia & the Clouds	Olivia & Las Nubes	Tomás Pichardo-Espaillat	Dominican Republic
Real		Adele Tulli	Italy, France
Red Path	Les Enfants rouges	Lotfi Achour	Tunisia, France, Belgium, Poland
When the Phone Rang	Kada je Zazvonio Telefon	Iva Radivojević	Serbia, United States

=== Leopard of Tomorrow (Pardi di Domani) ===
The Pardi di Domani section, also known as the Leopard of Tomorrow, features short and medium-length films.

==== Concorso Internazionale ====
The Concorso Internazionale portion of the Pardi di Domani competition features short and medium-length films by emerging directors throughout the world.

English Title	Original Title	Director(s)	Production Country
400 Cassettes		Thelyia Petraki	Greece, Germany
B(l)ind the Sacrifice		Nakhane	South Africa
Dull Spots of Greenish Colours		Sasha Svirsky	Germany
Freak		Claire Barnett	United States
Gender Reveal		Mo Matton	Canada
Hymn of the Plague	Gimn Chume	Ataka51	Germany, Russia
Icebergs		Carlos Pereira	Germany
Mother is a Natural Sinner		Boris Hadžija, Hoda Taheri	Germany, Iran
On the Impossibility of an Homage	Despre Imposibilitatea unui Omagiu	Xandra Popescu	Romania, Germany
On Weary Wings Go By	Linnud Läinud	Anu-Laura Tuttelberg	Estonia, Lithuania
Power Inferno	Ludwig	Anton Bialas	France
Punter		Jason Adam Maselle	South Africa, United States
Que Te Vaya Bonito, Rico		Joel Alfonso Vargas	United Kingdom, United States
Razeh-Del		Maryam Tafakory	Iran, United Kingdom, Italy
Soleil Gris		Camille Monnier	France, Belgium
The Calvary		Alina Orlov	Canada, United States, Israel
The Form		Melika Pazouki	Iran
The Nature of Dogs		Pom Bunsermvicha	Thailand, United States, Singapore, Hong Kong
Washhh		Mickey Lai	Malaysia, Ireland
What Mary Didn't Know		Konstantina Kotzamani	France, Greece, Sweden

==== Concorso Nazionale ====
The Concorso Nazionale portion of the Pardi di Domani competition features short and medium-length films by emerging Swiss directors.

Original Title	Director(s)	Production Country
Better Not Kill the Groove	Jonathan Leggett	Switzerland
Looking She Said I Forget	Naomi Pacifique	Switzerland, Netherlands
Lux Carne	Gabriel Grosclaude	Switzerland
Maman Danse	Mégane Brügger	Switzerland
Métropole	Theo Kunz	Switzerland
Progress Mining	Gabriel Böhmer	United Kingdom, Switzerland
Revier	Felix Scherrer	Switzerland
Sans Voix	Samuel Patthey	Switzerland
Sky Rogers: Manager de Stars	Ciel Sordeau	Switzerland
Tinderboys	Sarah Bucher, Carlos Tapia	Switzerland

==== Concorso Corti d'Autore ====
The Concorso Corti d'Autore portion of the Pardi di Domani competition features short and medium-length films by established filmmakers.

English Title	Original Title	Director(s)	Production Country
1 Hijo & 1 Padre		Andrés Ramírez Pulido	France, Colombia
Days Before the Death of Nicky	Jours avant la mort de Nicky	Denis Côté	Canada
Les Bouches		Valentin Merz	Switzerland, Mexico
La Fille qui Explose		Caroline Poggi, Jonathan Vinel	France
Like What Would Sorrow Look	愁何状	Hao Zhou	China
The Masked Monster	괴인의 정체	Syeyoung Park	South Korea
My Life is Wind (A Letter)		Anahita Ghazvinizadeh	United States, Sweden
Practice, Practice, Practice		Kevin Jerome Everson	United States
Revolving Rounds		Johann Lurf, Christina Jauernik	Austria
Upshot		Maha Haj	Palestine, Italy, France

=== Histoire(s) du Cinéma ===
The festival's Histoire(s) du Cinema section showcases films deemed significant to the evolution of cinema. Films by the festival's career award winners are presented in this section.

English Title	Original Title	Director(s)	Production Country
The Hours of Love (1963)	Le ore dell'amore	Luciano Salce	Italy
Jonah Who Will Be 25 in the Year 2000 (1976)	Jonas qui aura 25 ans en l'an 2000	Alain Tanner	Switzerland, France
Onda Nova (1983)		Francisco C. Martins, José Antonio Garcia	Brazil
Street of No Return (1989)		Samuel Fuller	France, Portugal
Cinéma Suisse Redécouvert
Faces of Love (1977)	Repérages	Michel Soutter	Switzerland, France
The Unburdening (1983)	L'Allégement	Marcel Schüpbach	Switzerland
Heritage Online
Les Parias du cinéma (1997)		Idrissa Ouédraogo	Switzerland
A Real Woman (1954)	Mulher de Verdade	Alberto Cavalcanti	Brazil
Samba Traoré (1992)		Idrissa Ouédraogo	Burkina Faso
Homage to Stan Brakhage
Cat's Cradle (1959)		Stan Brakhage	United States
Dog Star Man: Prelude (1961)		Stan Brakhage	United States
Mothlight (1963)		Stan Brakhage	United States
Murder Psalm (1980)		Stan Brakhage	United States
The Dante Quartet (1987)		Stan Brakhage	United States
The Wonder Ring (1955)		Stan Brakhage	United States
Untitled (For Marilyn) (1992)		Stan Brakhage	United States
Window Water Baby Moving (1959)		Stan Brakhage	United States
Leopard Club Award: Irène Jacob
Three Colours: Red (1994)	Trois Couleurs: Rouge	Krzysztof Kieślowski	France, Switzerland, Poland
Pardo d'Onore Manor: Jane Campion
An Angel at My Table (1990)		Jane Campion	New Zealand
The Piano (1993)		Jane Campion	New Zealand
Raimondo Rezzonico Award: Stacey Sher
Django Unchained (2012)		Quentin Tarantino	United States
Erin Brockovich (2000)		Steven Soderbergh	United States
Pardo alla Carriera Ascona-Locarno Tourism: Shah Rukh Khan
Devdas (2002)		Sanjay Leela Bhansali	India

=== Open Doors Screenings ===
The Open Doors section is presented in collaboration with the Swiss Agency for Development and Cooperation. Since 2022, the section has featured works from Latin America and the Caribbean. The 2024 Open Doors films are drawn from nations throughout this region of focus.

English Title	Original Title	Director(s)	Production Country
About Queens and Other Colors (2021)	De reinas y otros colores	Juan Herrera Zuluaga	Guatemala
Aphorisms of the Lake (2021)	Aforismos del lago	Humberto González Bustillo	Venezuela
Back to Los Maravillas	Las Maravillas	Rob Mendoza	Ecuador
The Beach of Enchaquirados (2021)	La playa de los enchaquirados	Iván Mora Manzano	Ecuador
Bionico's Bachata	La bachata de Bionico	Yoel Morales	Dominican Republic
Black Mother (2018)		Khalik Allah	Jamaica
Eami (2022)		Paz Encina	Paraguay, Argentina, Mexico, Germany, United States, Netherlands, France
I Love Papuchi (2018)		Rosa María Rodríguez Pupo	Cuba
Kenbe Alaba (2020)		Wendy Desert	Haiti
Lost Chapters	Los capítulos perdidos	Lorena Alvarado	Venezuela, United States
Sirena		Olivia de Camps	Dominican Republic
The Skin of the Water	La piel del agua	Patricia Velásquez	Costa Rica, Chile
Tierra de Leche (2023)		Milton Guillén, Fiona Guy Hall	Nicaragua, United States
Three Leaves (2021)	Twa fèy	Eléonore Coyette, Sephora Monteau	Haiti, Belgium
Through Rocks and Clouds	Raiz	Franco García Becerra	Peru, Chile
Uncivilized (2019)		Michael Lees	Dominica
What Humans See as Blood, Jaguars See as Chicha (2023)	Lo que los humanos ven como sangre los jaguares ven como chicha	Luciana Decker Orozco	Bolivia

=== Locarno Kids ===
English Title	Original Title	Director(s)	Production Country
Akiko, the Flying Monkey (2024)	Akiko, der fliegende Affe	Veit Helmer	Germany
Banquise (2005)		Claude Barras, Cédric Louis	Switzerland
Block 5 (2024)	Igrišča ne damo	Klemen Dvornik	Slovenia, Czech Republic, Croatia, Serbia
Blue Sky Jo (2024)	La Petite et le vieux	Patrice Sauvé	Canada
A Boat in the Garden (2024)	Slocum et moi	Jean-François Laguionie	Luxembourg, France
The Cannonball Woman (2017)	La Femme Canon	Albertine Zullo, David Toutevoix	Switzerland, France, Canada
The Colors Within (2024)	きみの色	Naoko Yamada	Japan
The Dynamite Brothers (1949)	I fratelli Dinamite	Nino Pagot	Italy
Un enfant commode		Cédric Louis	Switzerland
E.T. the Extra-Terrestrial (1982)		Steven Spielberg	United States
Le Génie de la boîte de raviolis (2006)		Claude Barras	Switzerland
Land of the Heads (2009)	Au pays des têtes	Claude Barras, Cédric Louis	Switzerland, Canada
Living Large (2024)		Kristina Dufková	Czech Republic, Slovakia, France
My Life as a Courgette (2016)	Ma vie de Courgette	Claude Barras	Switzerland
Sainte Barbe (2007)		Claude Barras, Cédric Louis	Switzerland, Canada

=== Retrospettiva ===
The Lady With the Torch, a retrospective honoring the 100th anniversary of Columbia Pictures, will be presented in partnership with Cinémathèque suisse and Sony Pictures. Curated by Ehsan Khoshbakht, co-director of Il Cinema Ritrovato festival in Bologna, the retrospective will debut at Academy Museum of Motion Pictures in Los Angeles. An English-language companion book edited by Khoshbakht featuring writers from across the world was released in July 2024 by Les Éditions de l’Œil.

Original Title	Director(s)	Production Country
Address Unknown (1944)	William Cameron Menzies	United States
All the King's Men (1949)	Robert Rossen	United States
The Big Heat (1953)	Fritz Lang	United States
Bitter Victory (1957)	Nicholas Ray	United States
Brothers (1930)	Walter Lang	United States
Craig's Wife (1936)	Dorothy Arzner	United States
Disorder in the Court (1936)	Preston Black	United States
The First Time (1952)	Frank Tashlin	United States
Girls Under 21 (1940)	Max Nosseck	United States
The Glass Wall (1953)	Maxwell Shane	United States
Gun Fury (1953)	Raoul Walsh	United States
Gunman's Walk (1958)	Phil Karlson	United States
If You Could Only Cook (1935)	William A. Seiter	United States
It Should Happen to You (1954)	George Cukor	United States
The Killer That Stalked New York (1950)	Earl McEvoy	United States
The Lady from Shanghai (1947)	Orson Welles	United States
The Last Frontier (1955)	Anthony Mann	United States
Let Us Live (1939)	John Brahm	United States
Man's Castle (1933)	Frank Borzage	United States
Mr. Deeds Goes to Town (1936)	Frank Capra	United States
Murder by Contract (1958)	Irving Lerner	United States
My Sister Eileen (1942)	Alexander Hall	United States
My Sister Eileen (1955)	Richard Quine	United States
Mysterious Intruder (1946)	William Castle	United States
None Shall Escape (1944)	André de Toth	United States
Pest from the West (1939)	Del Lord	United States
Pickup (1951)	Hugo Haas	United States
Picnic (1955)	Joshua Logan	United States
Ride Lonesome (1959)	Budd Boetticher	United States
Sahara (1943)	Zoltan Korda	United States
The Talk of the Town (1942)	George Stevens	United States
Three Wise Girls (1932)	William Beaudine	United States
Together Again (1944)	Charles Vidor	United States
Twentieth Century (1934)	Howard Hawks	United States
Umpa (1933)	Archie Gottler	United States
Under Age (1941)	Edward Dmytryk	United States
The Undercover Man (1949)	Joseph H. Lewis	United States
The Walking Hills (1949)	John Sturges	United States
The Whole Town's Talking (1935)	John Ford	United States
Vanity Street (1932)	Nicholas Grinde	United States
Wall Street (1929)	Roy William Neill	United States
Washington Merry-Go-Round (1932)	James Cruze	United States
Women's Prison (1955)	Lewis Seiler	United States
You Nazty Spy! (1940)	Jules White	United States

== Independent sections ==
=== International Critics' Week (Semaine de la Critique) ===
The Semaine de la Critique is an independent section of the festival organized by the Swiss Association of Film Journalists in which seven new documentary feature films are presented.

English Title	Original Title	Director(s)	Production Country
Dear Beautiful Beloved		Juri Rechinsky	Austria
The Deposition	La Déposition	Claudia Marschal	France
Familiar Places		Maia Reinhardt	Germany
His Parents	Jenseits von Schuld	Katharina Köster, Katrin Nemec	Germany
A Sisters' Tale		Leila Amini	Switzerland, France, Iran
Ways to Traverse a Territory	Formas de atravesar un territorio	Gabriela Domínguez Ruvalcaba	Mexico
We, the Inheritors	Wir Erben	Simon Baumann	Switzerland

=== Panorama Suisse ===
The independent Panorama Suisse section features highlights of contemporary Swiss cinema.

English Title	Original Title	Director(s)	Production Country
Back to Alexandria	Retour en Alexandrie	Tamer Ruggli	Switzerland, France
Blackbird Blackbird Blackberry		Elene Naveriani	Switzerland, Georgia
The Fortunate Ones	Le Vent qui siffle dans les grues	Jeanne Waltz	Portugal, Switzerland
The Hearing	Die Anhörung	Lisa Gerig	Switzerland
The Landscape and the Fury		Nicole Vögele	Switzerland
Mountain Ride	Bergfahrt - Reise zu den Riesen	Dominique Margot	Switzerland
Paradises of Diane	Les Paradis de Diane	Carmen Jaquier, Jan Gassmann	Switzerland
Riverboom		Claude Baechtold	Switzerland
Songs Within	Jakobs Ross	Katalin Gödrös	Switzerland, Luxembourg
The Vanishing of Bruno Bréguet	La scomparsa di Bruno Bréguet	Olmo Cerri	Switzerland

== Official awards ==
=== Concorso Internazionale ===
- Golden Leopard: Toxic by Saulė Bliuvaitė
- Special Jury Prize: Moon by Kurdwin Ayub
- Pardo for Best Direction: Drowning Dry by Laurynas Bareiša
- Pardo for Best Performance:
  - Kim Min-hee for By the Stream
  - Gelminė Glemžaitė, Agnė Kaktaitė, Giedrius Kiela, Paulius Markevičius for Drowning Dry
- Special Mentions:
  - Youth (Hard Times) by Wang Bing
  - Salve Maria by Mar Coll

=== Concorso Cineasti del Presente ===
- Golden Leopard – Filmmakers of the Present: Holy Electricity by Tato Kotetishvili
- Best Emerging Director Award: Hanami by Denise Fernandes
- Special Jury Prize CINÉ+: Listen to the Voices by Maxime Jean-Baptiste
- Pardo for Best Performance:
  - Callie Hernandez for Invention
  - Anna Mészöly for Lesson Learned
- Special Mentions:
  - Lesson Learned by Bálint Szimler
  - When the Phone Rang by Iva Radivojević

=== Pardi di Domani ===
==== Concorso Corti d’Autore ====
- Pardino d’Oro Swiss Life for the Best Auteur Short Film: Upshot by Maha Haj
- Special Mention: Gwe-in Esi Jeongche (The Masked Monster) by Park Syeyoung
- Locarno Film Festival Short Film Candidate – European Film Awards: La Fille qui Explose by Caroline Poggi and Jonathan Vinel

==== Concorso Internazionale ====
- Pardino d’Oro SRG SSR for the Best International Short Film: Washhh by Mickey Lai
- Pardino d’Argento SRG SSR for the International Competition: Gimn Chune (Hymn of the Plague) by Ataka51
- Pardi di Domani Best Direction Award – BONALUMI Engineering: Que te Vaya Bonito, Rico by Joel Alfonso Vargas
- Medien Patent Verwaltung AG Award: The Form by Melika Pazouki
- Special Mention: Freak by Claire Barnett

==== Concorso Nazionale ====
- Pardino d’Oro Swiss Life for the Best Swiss Short Film Sans Voix by Samuel Patthey
- Pardino d’Argento Swiss Life for the National Competition: Better Not Kill the Groove by Jonathan Leggett
- Best Swiss Newcomer Award: Gabriel Grosclaude for Lux Carne
- Special Mention: Progress Mining by Gabriel Böhmer

=== Piazza Grande ===
==== Letterboxd Piazza Grande Award ====
The inaugural Letterboxd Piazza Grande Award will honor a new feature film that debuts on the Piazza Grande during the festival. The winning film will be selected by a jury of young film critics and Letterboxd staff. This new prize marks the first official award given by an international film festival in partnership with the Letterboxd platform.

- Gaucho Gaucho by Michael Dweck and Gregory Kershaw

==== Prix du Public ====
Presented in partnership with UBS, the Prix du public is the official audience award of the Locarno Film Festival.

- Reinas by Klaudia Reynicke

== Special awards ==
=== Leopard of Honour (Pardo d’Onore Manor) ===
- Jane Campion

=== Excellence Award Davide Campari ===
- Mélanie Laurent
- Guillaume Canet

=== Leopard Club Award ===
- Irène Jacob

=== Lifetime Achievement Award ===
- Alfonso Cuarón

=== Locarno Kids Award la Mobiliare ===
- Claude Barras

=== Pardo alla Carriera Ascona-Locarno Tourism ===
- Shah Rukh Khan

=== Premio Raimondo Rezzonico ===
- Stacey Sher

=== Vision Award Ticinomoda ===
- Ben Burtt
