= Hellcats (film) =

- Hangul: 뜨거운 것이 좋아
- RR: Tteugeoun geosi joa
- MR: Ttŭgŏun kŏsi choa
- Directed by: Kwon Chil-in
- Written by: Kim Hyun-soo; Kim Soo-ah; Park Hye-ryun
- Produced by: Kang Woo-suk; Kim Eun-young
- Starring: Lee Mi-sook; Kim Min-hee; Ahn So-hee
- Cinematography: Jo Yong-gyu
- Edited by: Kim Sun-min
- Distributed by: Cinema Service
- Release date: January 17, 2008
- Running time: 114 minutes
- Country: South Korea
- Language: Korean

Hellcats (Korean: 뜨거운 것이 좋아; RR: Tteugeoun geosi joa; lit. 'Like It Hot') is a 2008 South Korean romantic comedy film about an extended family of three women from different generations—the fortysomething interior designer Young-mi (Lee Mi-sook), the 27-year old screenwriter Ah-mi (Kim Min-hee), and the high school student Kang-ae (Ahn So-hee) -- who are all engaged in dilemmas regarding love and sex.

== Plot ==
27-year-old Ah-mi is a freelance screenwriter, and she's on her 17th rewrite for a screenplay that has been in the works for over a year. For the past 3 years, she's been living with her older sister Young-mi because she can't afford rent on her own. Ah-mi dreams of success and independence, but these seem far-off. She has a boyfriend named Won-suk, a member of a struggling rock band, who is mostly broke. Then one day, she goes out on a blind date and a new guy, Seung-won, enters her life. Seung-won is a successful accountant, and is very different from Won-suk.

Meanwhile, 40-year-old Young-mi is a happy, independent single mother and interior designer. She begins working with a theatre company where she meets a much younger actor named Kyoung-soo, who takes a romantic interest in her. But even her sexy, confident self gets insecure when on her next doctor's visit, she learns that she's undergoing menopause.

There is also Young-mi's teenage daughter, Kang-ae. She is a bright, optimistic high school student, whose current goal in life is to figure out a way to get a kiss from her boyfriend of three years, Ho-jae. Kang-ae's best friend, Mi-ran, a self-proclaimed dating expert, coaches Kang-ae in matters of love. Mi-ran helps Kang-ae plan a strategy for her first kiss, but their scheme goes haywire, and Kang-ae's first kiss ends up being with Mi-ran.

Although different in age, attitude about life, and dating preferences, the three women each learn to find their own unique way to happiness.

== Cast ==
- Lee Mi-sook as Kim Young-mi
- Kim Min-hee as Kim Ah-mi
- Ahn So-hee as Kim Kang-ae
- Kim Sung-soo as Oh Seung-won
- Kim Heung-soo as Na Won-suk
- Yoon Hee-seok as Choi Kyung-soo
- Kang Hae-in as Yoo Mi-ran
- Kim Bum as Lee Ho-jae
- Jang Hang-jun as Director Ahn
- Park Kwang-jung as Gynecologist
- Jung In-gi as Cafe owner
- Oh Yeon-ah as Woman in Na Won-suk's workshop
- Lee Myeong-haeng as Travel agency friend
- Kim Gyeong-hyeong as Customer
- Moon Se-yoon as Ah-mi's hairstylist
- Jun-seong Kim as Young-mi's nail artist
- Lee Eun-sung as Kang-ae's cosmetics staff member

== Awards and nominations ==
Year	Award	Category	Recipient	Result
2008	44th Baeksang Arts Awards	Best Actress	Kim Min-hee	Won
2008	44th Baeksang Arts Awards	Best New Actor	Kim Heung-soo	Nominated
2008	9th Busan Film Critics Awards	Best Actress	Kim Min-hee	Won
2008	17th Buil Film Awards	Best New Actress	Ahn So-hee	Nominated
2008	17th Buil Film Awards	Best Editing	Kim Sun-min	Won
2008	7th Korean Film Awards	Best Actress	Kim Min-hee	Nominated
