= Giovanni Comini =

Italian politician (1906–2002)

Federal secretary of Brescia
- In office 12 April 1935 – March 1940

Member of the Chamber of Fasces and Corporations
- In office 23 March 1939 – 28 March 1940

Personal details
- Born: 27 October 1906 Brescia, Kingdom of Italy
- Died: 2002 (aged 95–96) Cellatica, Lombardy, Italy
- Political party: National Fascist Party
- Occupation: Journalist

Giovanni Comini (27 October 1906 – 2002) was an Italian politician, who served as member of the Chamber of Fasces and Corporations, and federal secretary of Brescia for the National Fascist Party.

== Life and career ==
An ardent supporter of Fascism, Giovanni Comini was trained at the Fascist University Groups and rapidly advanced in the youth organizations of the National Fascist Party, first becoming vice-mayor of Brescia in 1929 and later the federal secretary of the Province of Brescia on 12 April 1935, at the young age of 28.

During his term as federal secretary, Comini was assigned by Secretary Achille Starace to stay in close contact with and closely monitor the poet Gabriele D'Annunzio, who was a source of concern for Benito Mussolini. Comini's diaries contain impressions and detailed accounts of the surveillance period and his interactions with D'Annunzio, as well as the involvement of the OVRA in the matter: "Informers and spies of every kind. More or less secret agents. Professional and amateur investigators, shrewd and not, but all always ready to sell gossip and nonsense to the highest bidder. If they had told me a month ago, I wouldn't have believed it". At the end of his assignment, with the death of the poet on 1 March 1938, Comini wrote: "D'Annunzio's death removes a major worry from me".

Comini's federal mandate lasted five years, during which he received a promotion for exceptional merit on the proposal of Generals Giovanni Girolamo Romei Longhena and Pietro Maravigna. In 1940, after informing Mussolini about the Brescia population's opposition to entering the war, he was replaced as federal secretary by Antonio Valli.

He was also national deputy of the Chamber of Fasces and Corporations from March 1939 to March 1940.

Comini died in Cellatica in 2002.

== In media ==
Giovanni Comini is portrayed by Francesco Patanè in the 2021 film The Bad Poet by Gianluca Jodice.

== Sources ==
- Roberto Festorazzi (2005). D'Annunzio e la piovra fascista. Spionaggi al Vittoriale nella testimonianza del federale di Brescia. Rome: Il Minotauro. ISBN 978-88-8073-100-9.
