= By the Stream =

2024 film by Hong Sang-soo

- Hangul: 수유천
- RR: Suyucheon
- MR: Suyuch'ŏn
- Directed by: Hong Sang-soo
- Written by: Hong Sang-soo
- Produced by: Hong Sang-soo
- Starring: Kim Min-hee; Kwon Hae-hyo; Cho Yun-hee; Ha Seong-guk
- Cinematography: Hong Sang-soo
- Edited by: Hong Sang-soo
- Music by: Hong Sang-soo
- Production company: Jeonwonsa Film
- Release date: 16 August 2024 (Locarno)
- Running time: 111 minutes
- Country: South Korea
- Language: Korean

By the Stream (Korean: 수유천; RR: Suyucheon, also known as Suyoocheon) is a 2024 South Korean drama film written and directed by Hong Sang-soo. In August 2024, the film was selected to compete for the Golden Leopard at the 77th Locarno Film Festival, where Kim Min-hee won Pardo for Best Performance Award.

== Premise ==
Art instructor Jeonim asks her uncle Sieon, a former actor, to write and direct a play for the theatre festival at the university where she teaches. Her boss, Jeong, is a fan of Sieon, and the pair develop feelings for each other to Jeonim's dismay.

== Cast ==
- Kim Min-hee as Jeonim, a university art instructor
- Kwon Hae-hyo as Sieon, a former actor turned bookstore owner
- Cho Yun-hee as Jeong, Jeonim's boss
- Ha Seong-guk
- Kang Soyi
- Park Hanbitnara
- O Yoonsoo
- Park Miso
- Lee Kyoungmin
- Han Nuri
- Kim Sunjin

== Release ==
By the Stream debuted on 16 August 2024 in the Concorso Internazionale competition at the 77th Locarno Film Festival. Ahead of the film's premiere, it was acquired for international sales by Finecut, from whom Cinema Guild purchased North American theatrical distribution rights.

In September 2024, By the Stream will screen in the Centrepiece section of the Toronto International Film Festival, marking the film's North American debut. The film is also slated to screen at the 2024 New York Film Festival.

== Reception ==
=== Critical response ===
On the review aggregator website Rotten Tomatoes, 100% of 31 critics' reviews are positive, with an average rating of 7.8/10.

=== Accolades ===
Award	Ceremony date	Category	Recipient(s)	Result	Ref.
Locarno Film Festival	17 August 2024	Golden Leopard	By the Stream	Nominated	
Locarno Film Festival	17 August 2024	Leopard for Best Performance	Kim Min-hee	Won	
Gijón International Film Festival	23 November 2024	Best Feature Film	By the Stream	Won	
Gijón International Film Festival	23 November 2024	Best Actress	Kim Min-hee	Won	
