= Marta Mateus =

Portuguese director born 1984

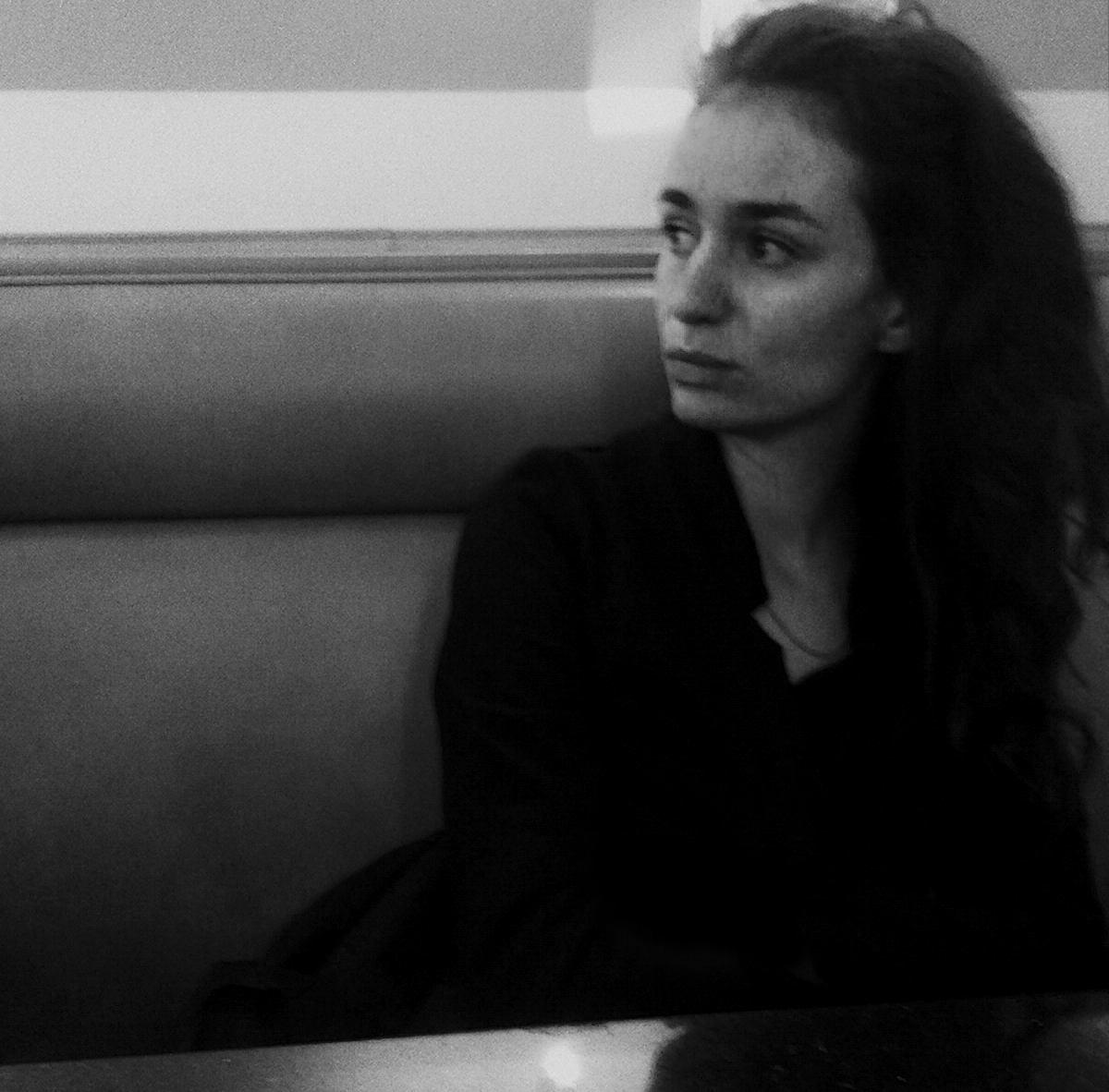
- Marta Mateus in 2016
- Born: 1984; Estremoz, Portugal
- Occupations: Film Director; Producer
- Known for: Fire of Wind (Fogo do Vento)

Marta Mateus (born 1984) is a Portuguese film director. She is known for her first film Fogo do Vento (Fire of Wind). Her work has been compared to that of Straub-Huillet.

== Education and early life ==
Mateus grew up in the Alentejo region of Portugual, specifically in Estremoz. She did not study cinema in school and instead studied philosophy, music, photography, and theater.

== Career ==
She began her directing career with the 2017 short film Farpões Baldios [Barbs, Wastelands]. In 2018, she joined the Casa de Velázquez, Académie de France à Madrid. In 2018 she also founded the production company Clarão Companhia.

This led to her directing and producing her first feature length film Fogo do Vento (Fire of Wind) released in 2024. The film took four years to complete and was set in the Alentejo region where Mateus grew up. It premiered in the main competition at the 77th Locarno Film Festival in 2024.
