= On the Beach at Night Alone =

2017 film by Hong Sang-soo

- Theatrical release poster
- Directed by: Hong Sang-soo
- Written by: Hong Sang-soo
- Produced by: Hong Sang-soo
- Starring: Kim Min-hee; Seo Young-hwa; Kwon Hae-hyo; Jung Jae-young; Song Seon-mi; Moon Sung-keun
- Cinematography: Kim Hyung-koo; Park Hong-yeol
- Edited by: Hahm Sung-won
- Production company: Jeonwonsa Film Company
- Distributed by: Contents Panda
- Release dates: 16 February 2017 (Berlin); 23 March 2017 (South Korea)
- Running time: 101 minutes
- Country: South Korea
- Language: Korean
- Box office: $429,159

On the Beach at Night Alone (Korean: 밤의 해변에서 혼자; RR: Bamui haebyeoneseo honja) is a 2017 South Korean drama film written, produced, and directed by Hong Sang-soo. It was selected to compete for the Golden Bear in the main competition section of the 67th Berlin International Film Festival, where Kim Min-hee won the Silver Bear for Best Actress award.

== Premise ==
Young-hee is an actress who has left Seoul after a highly publicized affair with a married man, who is also a colleague and a well-known film director. The first part of the film is set in Hamburg, where Young-hee stays with her older friend Jee-young and the latter's English-speaking German artist acquaintances. The two walk around a street market, a park, and a bookstore. Jeeyoung says she has no more desire for men, and Younghee encourages her to play around. Later, Young-hee and her friends visit the beach. The camera pans to Young-hee's friends, and then back to Young-hee being carried off over the shoulder of a man.

The film's second part begins with Young-hee sitting in a movie theater, lingering for a while after the lights come up and the theater empties. It is winter; Young-hee has returned to Gangneung, Korea, and reunites with several old friends over dinner and drinks. She falls asleep on the beach, and dreams of having dinner with the director, where she both confronts and reunites with him.

== Cast ==
- Kim Min-hee as Young-hee
- Seo Young-hwa as Jee-young
- Kwon Hae-hyo as Chun-woo
- Jung Jae-young as Myung-soo
- Song Seon-mi as Jun-hee
- Moon Sung-keun as Sang-won
- Ahn Jae-hong as Seung-hee
- Park Yea-ju as Do-hee
- Gong Min-jeung as Ma-ri

== Reception ==
=== Critical response ===
On the review aggregator website Rotten Tomatoes, the film has an approval rating of 92% based on 52 reviews, with an average rating of 7.9/10. The website's critics consensus reads, "On the Beach at Night Alone finds writer-director Sang-soo Hong working in a more personal vein—without losing the singular sensibilities that have informed much of his acclaimed earlier work. Metacritic, which uses a weighted average, assigned the film a score of 80 out of 100, based on 14 critics, indicating "generally favorable" reviews.

=== Accolades ===
Year	Award	Category	Recipient	Result
2017	67th Berlin International Film Festival	Silver Bear for Best Actress	Kim Min-hee	Won
2017	67th Berlin International Film Festival	Golden Bear	Hong Sang-soo	Nominated
2017	53rd Baeksang Arts Awards	Best Director	Hong Sang-soo	Nominated
2017	Jerusalem Film Festival	Wilf Family Foundation Award for Best International Film	On the Beach at Night Alone	Won
2017	37th Korean Association of Film Critics Awards	Top Ten Films	On the Beach at Night Alone	Won
2017	26th Buil Film Awards	Best Actress	Kim Min-hee	Nominated
2018	23rd Chunsa Film Art Awards	Best Actress	Kim Min-hee	Nominated
