= Simon Jaquemet =

Swiss filmmaker (born 1978)

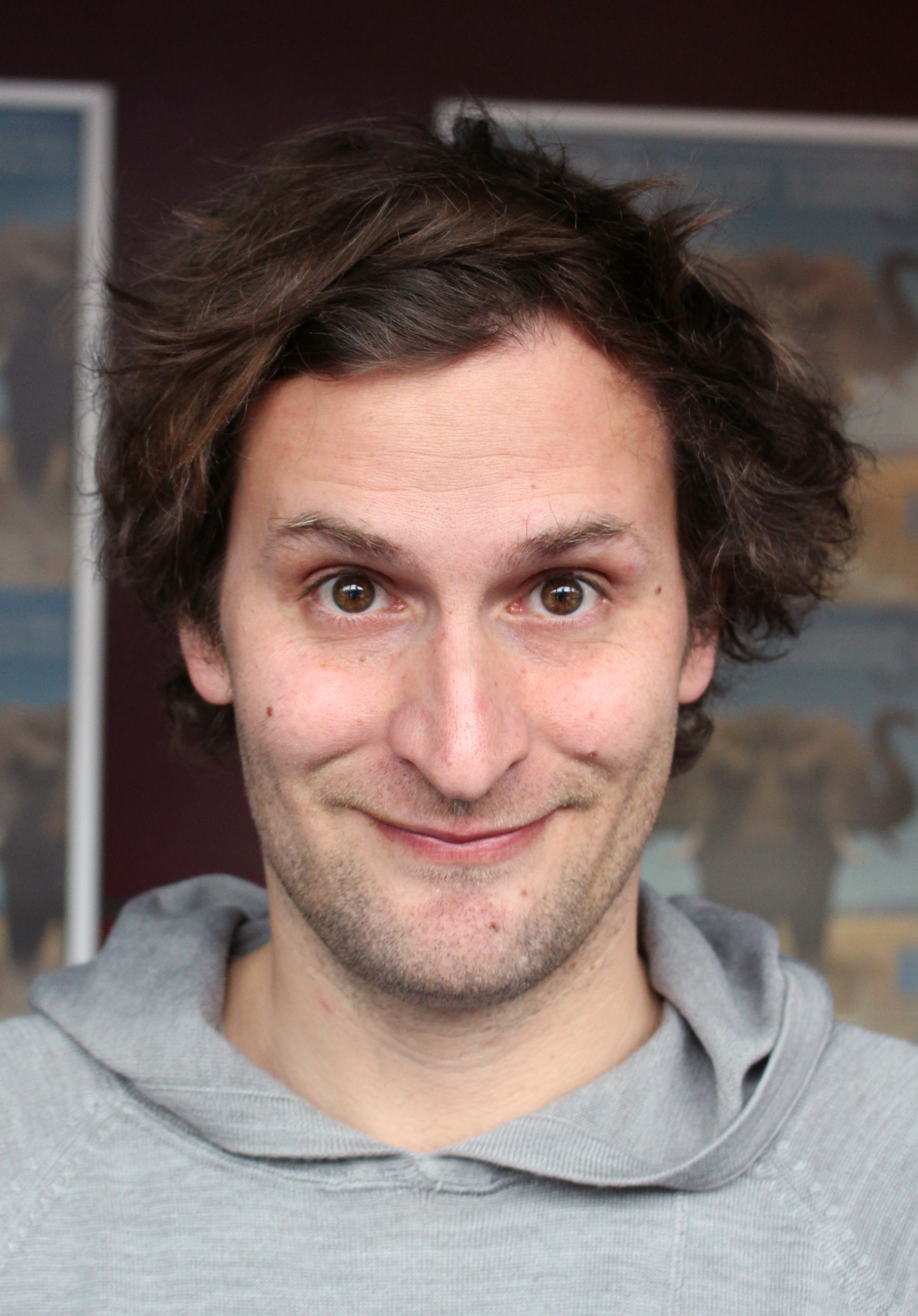
- Born: 1978 (age 47–48); Zurich, Switzerland
- Occupations: Film director, screenwriter

Simon Jaquemet (born 1978) is a Swiss filmmaker and AI artist.

== Early life and education ==
Jaquemet was born in Zurich and was raised on a farm near Basel. He studied filmmaking at Zurich University of the Arts.

== Career ==
After directing a series of short films, Jaquemet's feature debut, the teenage drama film War, premiered at the San Sebastián International Film Festival in 2014. War won the Max Ophüls Award for Best Feature Film and was nominated for Best Feature at the 2015 Swiss Film Awards.

Jaquemet's second feature film The Innocent, starring Judith Hofmann as a neuroscience researcher who struggles to reconcile her devout Christian faith with her employer's radical experiments on primates, premiered at the 2018 Toronto International Film Festival. The film garnered Jaquemet a nomination in the Best Screenplay category at the 2019 Swiss Film Awards.

In 2024, Jaquemet's science fiction thriller film Electric Child was selected to premiere at the 77th Locarno Film Festival.

== Filmography ==
Year	Title	Ref.
2014	War (Chrieg)	
2018	The Innocent (Der Unschuldige)	
2024	Electric Child	

== Awards and nominations ==
Year	Award	Category	Nominated work	Result	Ref.
2015	Swiss Film Awards	Best Feature Film	War	Nominated	
2015	Max Ophüls Film Festival	Best Feature Film	War	Won	
2019	Swiss Film Awards	Best Screenplay	The Innocent	Nominated	
