= The Woman Who Ran =

2020 film by Hong Sang-soo

- Theatrical release poster
- Hangul: 도망친 여자
- RR: Domangchin yeoja
- MR: Tomangch'in yŏja
- Directed by: Hong Sang-soo
- Written by: Hong Sang-soo
- Produced by: Hong Sang-soo
- Starring: Kim Min-hee; Seo Young-hwa; Song Seon-mi; Kim Sae-byuk
- Cinematography: Kim Su-min
- Edited by: Hong Sang-soo
- Music by: Hong Sang-soo
- Production company: Jeonwonsa Film Co.
- Distributed by: CMC Pictures
- Release dates: 25 February 2020 (Berlinale); 17 September 2020 (South Korea)
- Running time: 77 minutes
- Country: South Korea
- Language: Korean

The Woman Who Ran (Korean: 도망친 여자; RR: Domangchin yeoja) is a 2020 South Korean drama film written, produced, directed, edited and scored by Hong Sang-soo. It was selected to compete for the Golden Bear in the main competition section at the 70th Berlin International Film Festival. At Berlin, Hong Sang-soo won the Silver Bear for Best Director.

== Cast ==
- Kim Min-hee as Gam-hee
- Seo Young-hwa as Young-soon
- Song Seon-mi as Su-young
- Kim Sae-byuk as Woo-jin
- Lee Eun-mi as Young-jin
- Kwon Hae-hyo as Mr. Jung
- Shin Seok-ho as Cat Man
- Ha Seong-guk as Young Poet
- Darcy Paquet as Foreign audience member

== Critical reception ==
According to the review aggregator Metacritic, which gave the film an average score of 79 out of 100 based on 10 critic reviews, the film received "generally favorable reviews". On review aggregator website Rotten Tomatoes, the film holds an approval rating of 98% based on 45 reviews, with an average rating of 8,1/10. The site's critical consensus reads, "Narratively slight yet cumulatively absorbing, The Woman Who Ran finds writer-director Hong Sang-soo continuing to work in a beguilingly minor key."
