= Pardo for Best Performance =

Award given to the best performance at the Locarno Film Festival

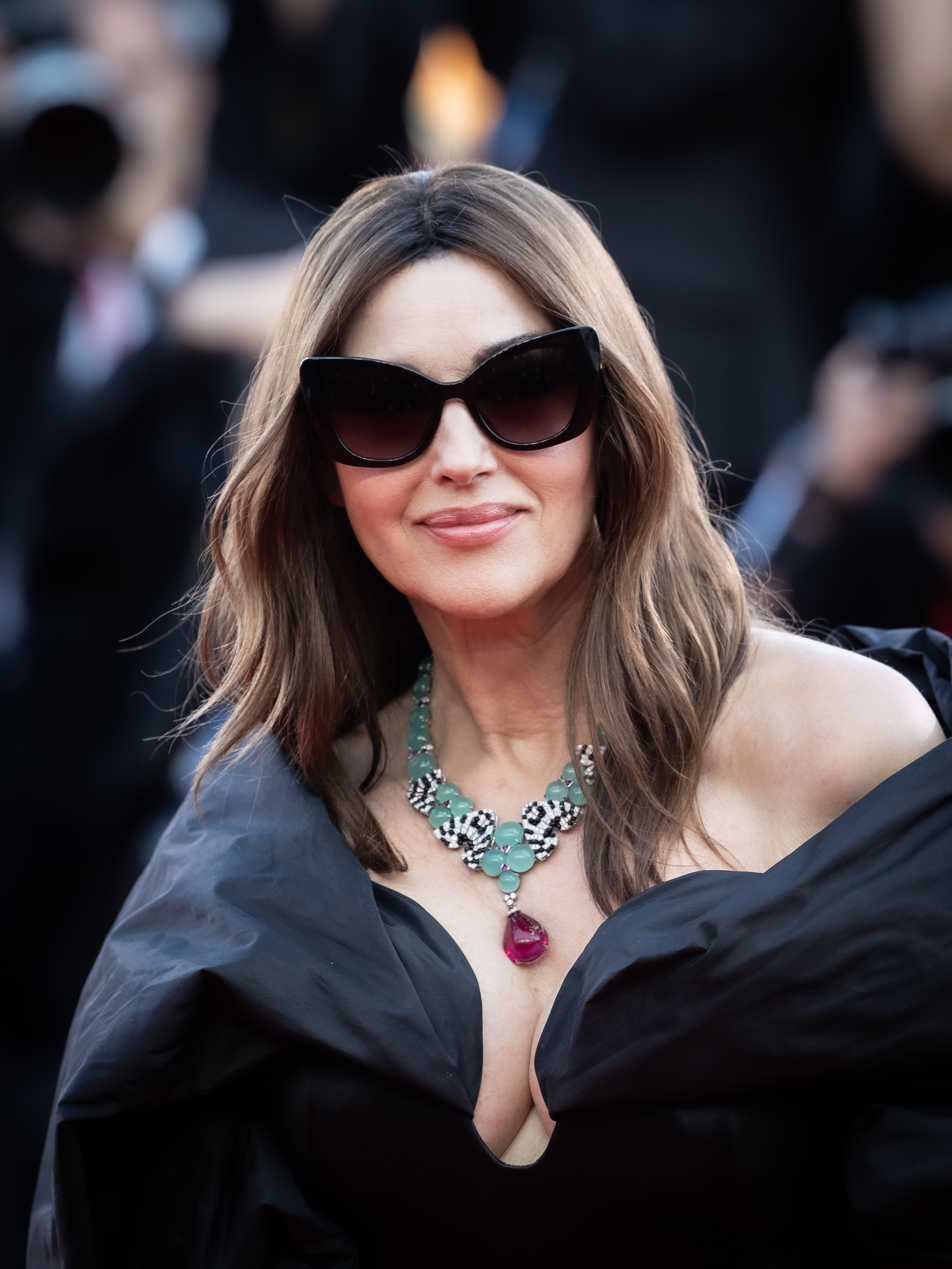
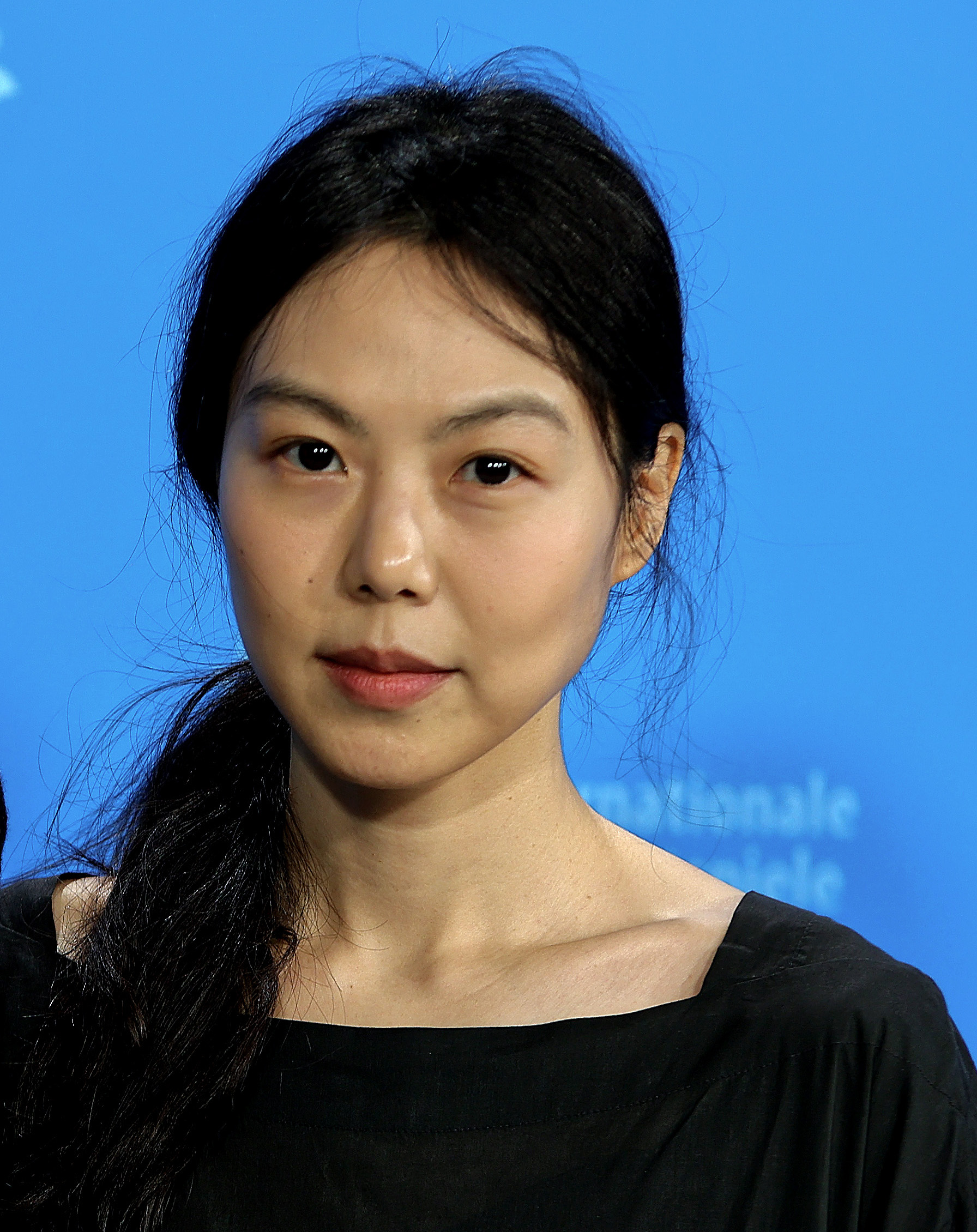
- 2026 recipient: Monica Bellucci and Kim Min-hee
- Awarded for: Best acting performance
- Country: Switzerland
- Presented by: Locarno International Film Festival
- First award: 2023
- Currently held by: Monica Bellucci for Ketticè; Kim Min-hee for Nowhere to Lay My Eyes

The Pardo for Best Performance (English: Leopard for Best Performance; Italian: Pardo per la migliore interpretazione) is an award given at the Locarno International Film Festival. It was first awarded in 2023.

== History ==
In 2022, the Locarno Film Festival announced that the two acting categories would be retired and replaced with one gender neutral category, with both Best Actor and Best Actress merging into two Pardo Awards for the Best Performance category.

Greek actress Dimitra Vlagopoulou and Dutch actress Renée Soutendijk were the prizes inaugural winners at the 76th edition, for their roles in Animal and Sweet Dreams, respectively. At the 77th edition, Drowning Dry's main cast won the prize, becoming the first film to do so.

Kim Min-hee was the first performer to win twice, for By the Stream (2022) and Nowhere to Lay My Eyes (2026), both directed by her partner Hong Sang-soo.

== Winners ==
Year	Performer	Role(s)	English title	Original title	Ref.
2023	Dimitra Vlagopoulou	Kalia	Animal		
2023	Renée Soutendijk	Agathe	Sweet Dreams		
2024	Kim Min-hee	Jeonim	By the Stream	수유천	
2024	Gelminė Glemžaitė	Ernesta	Drowning Dry	Sesės	
2024	Agnė Kaktaitė	Justė	Drowning Dry	Sesės	
2024	Giedrius Kiela	Tomas	Drowning Dry	Sesės	
2024	Paulius Markevičius	Lukas	Drowning Dry	Sesės	
2025	Marya Imbro	Masha	White Snail		
2025	Mikhail Senkov	Misha	White Snail		
2025	Manuela Martelli	Teresa	God Will Not Help	Bog neće pomoći	
2025	Ana Marija Veselčić	Milena	God Will Not Help	Bog neće pomoći	
2026	Monica Bellucci	Giulio's mother	Ketticè		
2026	Kim Min-hee	Sang-hee	Nowhere to Lay My Eyes	눈둘데가 없네	
