= The Day After (2017 film) =

2017 film

- Film poster
- Directed by: Hong Sang-soo
- Written by: Hong Sang-soo
- Produced by: Hong Sang-soo
- Starring: Kwon Hae-hyo; Kim Min-hee; Kim Sae-byuk; Jo Yoon-hee
- Cinematography: Kim Hyung-koo
- Edited by: Hahm Sung-won
- Music by: Hong Sang-soo
- Production company: Jeonwonsa Film Co.
- Distributed by: Contents Panda
- Release dates: 22 May 2017 (Cannes); 6 July 2017 (South Korea)
- Running time: 91 minutes
- Country: South Korea
- Language: Korean
- Box office: US$129,440

The Day After (Korean: 그 후; RR: Geu hu) is a 2017 South Korean drama film written, produced, directed and scored by Hong Sang-soo. It was selected to compete for the Palme d'Or in the main competition section at the 2017 Cannes Film Festival.

== Cast ==
- Kwon Hae-hyo as Kim Bong-wan
- Kim Min-hee as Song Ah-reum
- Kim Sae-byuk as Lee Chang-sook
- Jo Yoon-hee as Song Hae-joo

== Reception ==
On Rotten Tomatoes, the film has an approval rating of 79%, based on reviews from 39 critics, with an average rating of 7.32/10. The website's critical consensus reads, "The Day After may rank among the slighter works in writer-director Hong Sang-soo's filmography, yet it still presents an absorbingly earnest look at relationships in turmoil." On Metacritic, the film has an average score of 72 out of 100, based on fourteen critics, indicating "generally favorable reviews".

== Awards ==
Awards	Category	Recipient	Result	Ref.
2017 Cannes Film Festival	Palme d'Or	Hong Sang-soo	Nominated	
12th Asian Film Awards	Best Film	The Day After	Nominated	
12th Asian Film Awards	Best Director	Hong Sang-soo	Nominated	
12th Asian Film Awards	Best Actress	Kim Min-hee	Nominated	
23rd Chunsa Film Art Awards	Best Director	Hong Sang-soo	Nominated	
