= 57th Sitges Film Festival =

2024 edition of Spanish film festival

- Official poster by CHINA.
- Opening film: Presence
- Closing film: Never Let Go
- Location: Sitges, Catalonia, Spain
- Founded: 1968
- Awards: Best Film: The Devil's Bath by Veronika Franz and Severin Fiala
- Festival date: 3–13 October 2024
- Website: sitgesfilmfestival.com/en

Sitges Film Festival
- 2025 2023

The 57th Sitges International Fantastic Film Festival of Catalonia took place from 3 to 13 October 2024, in Sitges, Catalonia, Spain. Steven Soderbergh's psychological thriller film Presence opened the festival, while Alexandre Aja's survival horror film Never Let Go served as the festival's closing film. Austrian historical horror film The Devil's Bath, directed by Veronika Franz and Severin Fiala, won the Best Film award.

== Background ==
While some films were announced in July 2024, the complete lineup was revealed on 10 September 2024. The festival's poster, commissioned to design agency CHINA and created through chemical techniques on photography, pays hommage to Tod Browning's 1932 horror film Freaks.

Australian actor Geoffrey Rush will be honoured with the Honorary Grand Prize (Gran Premi Honorífic). French director Alexandre Aja, English actor Nick Frost, American filmmaker Mike Flanagan, American actor Corey Feldman, American actress Heather Langenkamp, Greek-Italian film producer Ovidio G. Assonitis, and American director Fred Dekker, all will be recognized with the Time Machine Award (Premi Màquina del Temps). Additionally, Italian actor Fabio Testi will received the Nosferatu Award (Premio Nosferatu) while French director Christophe Gans will be honored with the Premio Méliès Career, presented by the Méliès International Festivals Federation. On 24 September, it was announced that American actor Giancarlo Esposito will also be honored with the Time Machine Award, while Spanish director Mar Targarona will be recognized with the WomanInFan Award.

== Juries ==
The juries consists of the following members:

=== Main competition ===
- Fred Dekker, American screenwriter and film director.
- Stephen Thrower, English musician and author.
- Carlota Pereda, Spanish director and screenwriter.
- Christophe Gans, French director, producer and screenwriter.
- Lisa Dreyer, director of Fantastic Fest.

=== Noves Visions ===
- José Enrique Monterde, Spanish journalist and film critic.
- Rebecca de Pas, Spanish festival programmer.
- Olivia Cooper-Hadjian, French film critic and festival curator.

=== Anima't ===
- Bill Kopp, American animator, writer and voice actor.
- Verónica Buide, Spanish consultant, producer and president of Mujeres en la Industria de la Animación (MIA).
- Juanjo Sáez, Spanish cartoonist and illustrator.

=== Blood Window / Òrbita ===
- Roxana Ramos, Argentine film producer.
- Douglas Buck, American director and film editor.
- Nahikari Ipiña, Spanish film producer.

=== Méliès d'Argent ===
- Álex Mendíbil, Spanish screenwriter and researcher.
- Marysia Nikitiuk, Ukrainian director, screenwriter and fiction writer.
- Victoria McCollum, Northern Irish researcher.

=== Brigadoon ===
- Nerea Torrijos, Spanish costume designer.
- Ivan Villamel, Spanish film producer.
- Mariona Borrull Zapata, Spanish journalist and film critic.

=== Crítica / Méliès d'Or ===
- Josep M. Bunyol, Spanish film critic.
- Paola Franco, Spanish film critic.
- Sergi Sánchez, Spanish film critic.

=== SGAE Nova Autoria ===
- Jaume Balagueró, Spanish director and screenwriter.
- Aina Clotet, Spanish actress and director.
- Francesc Gener Rius, Spanish film composer.

== Sections ==
The films selected for each section are as follows:

=== Official selection ===
==== In competition ====
The following films were selected to be screened as a part of the official competition section:

English title	Original title	Director(s)	Production countrie(s)
2073		Asif Kapadia	United Kingdom
A Different Man		Aaron Schimberg	United States
Animale		Emma Benestan	France, Belgium
Azrael		E.L. Katz	United States
Basileia		Isabella Torre	Italy, Sweden
Still Life with Ghosts	Bodegón con fantasmas	Enrique Buleo	Spain, Serbia
Bury Your Dead	Enterre Seus Mortos	Marco Dutra	Brazil
Call of Water	Dans l'eau	Élise Otzenberger	France
Continent	Continente	Davi Pretto	Brazil, France, Argentina
Daniela Forever		Nacho Vigalondo	Spain, Belgium
Desert Road		Shannon Triplett	United States
The Devil's Bath	Des Teufels Bad	Veronika Franz and Severin Fiala	Austria, Germany
The Second Act	Le Deuxième Acte	Quentin Dupieux	France
Else		Thibault Emin	France, Belgium
Escape from the 21st Century	从21世纪安全撤离	Li Yang	China
Exhuma	파묘	Jang Jae-hyun	South Korea
Fréwaka		Aislinn Clarke	Ireland
Get Away		Steffen Haars	United Kingdom
Ghost Cat Anzu (Note: Also nominated for the Anima't Best Animated Film Award)	化け猫あんずちゃん	Yōko Kuno, Nobuhiro Yamashita	Japan
Luna		Alfonso Cortés-Cavanillas	Spain
Mads		David Moreau	France
Meanwhile on Earth	Pendant ce temps sur terre	Jéremy Clapin	France
Mr. K		Tallulah H. Schwab	Belgium, Netherlands, Norway
Nightbitch		Marielle Heller	United States
Night Silence	Cisza nocna	Bartosz M. Kowalski	Poland
Planet B		Aude Léa Rapin	France
Rich Flu		Galder Gaztelu-Urrutia	Spain
Sanatorium Under the Sign of the Hourglass		Brothers Quay	United Kingdom, Poland, Germany
Sister Midnight		Karan Kandhari	United Kingdom, India, Sweden
Strange Darling		JT Mollner	United States
The Rule of Jenny Pen		James Ashcroft	New Zealand
Twilight of the Warriors: Walled In	九龍城寨之圍城	Soi Cheang	Hong Kong
A Whale	Una ballena	Pablo Hernando	Spain

Highlighted title indicates Best Feature Film winner.

==== Out of competition ====
The following films were selected to be screened out of the competition section:

English title	Original title	Director(s)	Production countrie(s)
Sitges Collection
Apartment 7A		Natalie Erika James	United States
Apocalypse Z: The Beginning of the End	Apocalipsis Z: El principio del fin	Carles Torrens	Spain
Arcadian		Benjamin Brewer	United States, Canada, Ireland
Bookworm		Ant Timpson	New Zealand
Cuckoo		Tilman Singer	Germany, United States
Dead Talents Society	鬼才之道	John Hsu	Taiwan
The Wailing	El llanto	Pedro Martín-Calero	Spain, Argentina, France
Exorcism Chronicles: The Beginning	퇴마록	Kim Dong-chul	South Korea
Ghost Killer	ゴーストキラー	Kensuke Sonomura	Japan
Ick		Joseph Kahn	United States
The American Backyard	L'orto americano	Pupi Avati	Italy
The Substance		Coralie Fargeat	United States, United Kingdom, France
Please Don't Feed the Children		Destry Allyn Spielberg	United States
Special Screenings
Escape		Rodrigo Cortés	Spain
Never Let Go (closing film)		Alexandre Aja	United States
'Salem's Lot		Gary Dauberman	United States
Hush		Mike Flanagan	United States
House of Spoils		Bridget Savage Cole, Danielle Krudy	United States
Presence (opening film)		Steven Soderbergh	United States
Rose & Samurai 2: Return of the Pirate Queen		Hidenori Inoue	Japan
Terrifier 3		Damien Leone	United States
The Soul Eater	Le Mangeur d'Âmes	Alexandre Bustillo, Julie Maury	France, Belgium
The Wild Robot		Chris Sanders	United States

=== Órbita ===
The following films were selected to be screened as a part of the Órbita section, for films that "stand out for their unique approach and their audience appeal":

English title	Original title	Director(s)	Production countrie(s)
100 Yards	门前宝地	Xu Junfeng, Xu Haofeng	China
Cloud	クラウド	Kiyoshi Kurosawa	Japan
Confession	告白	Nobuhiro Yamashita	Japan
Diabolik: Who Are You?	Diabolik chi sei?	Antonio and Marco Manetti	Italy
Escape	탈주	Lee Jong-pil	South Korea
The Roundup: Punishment	범죄도시4	Heo Myung-haeng	South Korea
I, the Executioner	베테랑2	Ryoo Seung-wan	South Korea
Maldoror		Fabrice Du Welz	Belgium, France
Night Call	La nuit se traîne	Michael Blanchart	Belgium, France
Steppenwolf		Adilkhan Yerzhanov	Kazakhstan
The Goldfinger	金手指	Felix Chong	Hong Kong
The Kingdom	Le Royaume	Julien Colonna	France
Zero		Jean Luc Herbulot	United States
Special Sessions
Beating Hearts	L'Amour ouf	Gilles Lellouche	France, Belgium
The Moon Thieves	盜月者	Steve Yuen	Hong Kong

Highlighted title indicates Órbita winner.

=== Anima't ===
The following films were selected to be screened as a part of the Anima't section, for animated films:

English title	Original title	Director(s)	Production countrie(s)
Dalia y el Libro Rojo		David Bisbano	Argentina, Spain, Peru, Brazil, Ecuador, Colombia
Diplodocus		Wojtek Wawszczyk	Poland, Czech Republic
Mariposas Negras		David Baute	Spain, Panama
Memoir of a Snail		Adam Elliot	Australia
Night of the Zoopocalypse		Ricardo Curtis, Rodrigo Perez-Castro	Canada, France, Belgium
Pig that Survived Foot-and-Mouth Disease	구제역에서 살아 돌아온 돼지	Hur Bum-wook	South Korea
Savages	Sauvages	Claude Barras	Switzerland
Spermageddon		Tommy Wirkola, Rasmus A. Sivertsen	Norway
The Colors Within	きみの色	Naoko Yamada	Japan
The Glassworker	شیشہ گر	Usman Riaz	Pakistan
The Storm	大雨	Yang Zhigang	China
The Umbrella Fairy	伞少女	Jie Shen	China
Special Sessions
Fox and Hare Save the Forest	Vos & Haas redden het bos	Mascha Halberstad	Netherlands, Belgium, Luxembourg

Highlighted title indicates Anima't winner.

=== Noves Visions ===
The following films were selected to be screened as a part of the Noves Visions section, for films "with fantastic genre themes, committed to experimentation, new languages and formats, and the hybridization of genres":

English title	Original title	Director(s)	Production countrie(s)
A Desert		Joshua Erkman	United States
Body Odyssey		Grazia Tricarico	Italy, Switzerland
Centaures de la Nit		Marc Recha	Spain
Dead Mail		Joe DeBoer, Kyle McConaghy	United States
Electric Child		Simon Jaquemet	Switzerland, Germany, Philippines
Gazer		Ryan J. Sloan	United States
Infinite Summer		Miguel Llansó	Estonia, Spain
It Doesn't Get Any Better Than This		Rachel Kempf, Nick Toti	United States
The Hyperboreans	Los hiperbóreos	Joaquín Cociña, Cristóbal León	Chile
Love Me		Sam and Andy Zuchero	United States
Mi Bestia		Camila Beltrán	Colombia, France
Pepe		Nelson Carlo De Los Santos Arias	Dominican Republic, Namibia, Germany, France
Schirkoa: In Lies We Trust		Ishan Shukla	India, France, Germany
Sew Torn		Freddy Macdonald	United States, Switzerland
She Loved Blossoms More		Yannis Veslemes	Greece, France
Spirit in the Blood		Carly May Borgstrom	Germany, Canada
The Gesuidouz	ザ・ゲスイドウズ	Ken'ichi Ugana	Japan
The Killers	더 킬러스	Roh Deok, Kim Jong-kwan, Jang Hang-jun, Lee Myung-se	South Korea
Things Will Be Different		Michael Felker	United States
Timestalker		Alice Lowe	United Kingdom
Un Cuento de Pescadores		Edgar Nito	Mexico
Witte Wieven		Didier Konings	Netherlands
Your Monster		Caroline Lindy	United States
Petit Format
Death of an Actor		Ambroise Rateau	France
Don't Forget		Jeremy S. Thompson	Canada
The Evil Eye	El mal donat	Hector Mas, Alfons Canal	Andorra, Spain
Fishtank		Wendi Tang	United States, China
La Plaga		Gemma Capdevila	Spain
ME		Don Hertzfeldt	United States
Satomi		Rayner Wang	Japan, United States, Hong Kong
Say Wuff!		Fabian Podeszwa	Germany
Stills Moving		Kevin Tsung-Hsuan Yeh	Taiwan
Strawberry Shortcake		Deborah Devyn Chuang	Taiwan
The Image Seller		Donavan Richard	Canada
The Law of Extinction of Pain		Lee Wonjae	South Korea
The Tree of Sinners		Hiroyuki Onogawa, Rii Ishihara	Japan
Vinca Vision		Lazar Bodroza	Serbia
Special Sessions
Dragon Dilatation		Bertrand Mandico	France
The Fall (4K Director's Cut)		Tarsem Singh	United States, India

Highlighted title indicates Noves Visions winner.

=== Shorts ===
The following films were selected to be screened as a part of the Shorts section:

English title	Original title	Director(s)	Production countrie(s)
Competition Fantàstic
Agonist		Annie Marie Elliot	United States
Atom & Void		Gonçalo Almeida	Portugal
Attachment Theory		Katherine Jackson	New Zealand
Bisected		Daniel Piñeros	United States
Chew		Felix Dobaire	France
Cornucopia		Andrew Kevelson	United States
Drizzle in Johnson		Ivan Li	Canada, Hong Kong
From Me to You		Simret Cheema-Innis	Vietnam, United Kingdom
Humedad		Julieta Quiroga	Argentina
Imago		Rafa Dengrá	Spain
Lui		Matthias Couquet	France
Lullaby		Chi Thai	United Kingdom
Magnum Opus		Nicholas Kozakis	Australia
Make Me a Pizza		Talia Shea Levin	United States
Malet		Roger Danès, Alfred Pérez-Fargas	Spain
Meat Puppet		Eros V	United Kingdom
One for the Road		Daniel Carsenty	United States, Germany
Shadow		Kanell Allaway	United States
Skulk		Max Ward	United Kingdom
Triangle		Joseph Diaz	Spain
Anima't
Crimson Harbor		Victor Bonafonte	Spain
Devil's Paradise	Ett Ont	Lars Henrik, Lisa Rydberg	Sweden
Dolores		Cecilia Andalón	Mexico
Fish River Anthology	Mereneläviä	Veera Lamminpää	Finland
Free the Chickens		Matus Vizar	Slovakia, Czech Republic
Howl If You Love Me		John Dilworth	United States
Hurikán		Jan Saska	Czech Republic, France, Slovakia, Bosnia and Herzegovina
Inkwo for When the Starving Return		Amanda Strong	Canada
Joko		Iza Plucinska	Poland, Germany, Czech Republic
Kawauso	獺	Akihito Izuhara	Japan
The Fence	La Valla	Sam Orti	Spain
La Voix des Sirènes		Gianluigi Toccafondo	France, Italy
Magic Candies		Daisuke Nishio	Japan
Matta and Matto		Bianca Caderas, Kerstin Zemp	Switzerland
Monsoon Blue		Ellis Kayin Chan	Hong Kong
Shoes and Hooves		Viktória Traub	Hungary
Society of Clothes		Dahee Jeong	France, South Korea, Canada
Tennis, Oranges		Sean Pecknold	United States
The Hunt		Diogo Costa	Portugal, Spain, Japan, Netherlands
The Shadow of Dawn		Olga Stalev	Estonia
Trompet Voice	Voz de trompeta	David Monarte, Pilar Smoje	Chile
When It Comes (It Will Have Your Eyes)	Etorriko da (Eta zure begiak izango ditu)	Izibene Oñederra	Spain
Brigadoon
Céntrico		Luso Martínez	Spain
El Fantasma de la Mediocridad		Naxo Fiol	Spain
Escape		Lorenzo Manetti	United States
Este Será el Último. Naxo Fiol y su Cámara		Xavier Guillaumes, Carlos J. Lafuente Cerdán	Spain
Forgive Me		Cameron Sun	United States
Hive		Felipe Vargas Ferrufino	United States
The Harvest		David Barrera, Manuel Carballo	Spain
The Harvester		Gavin Bradley, Andrew Allen	United States
Voyager		Pablo Pagán	Spain
Will Helm		Bobby Roe	United States
Special Screenings
Help I'm Alien Pregnant		THUNDERLIPS	New Zealand
Kokuhaku		Adrià Guxens	Spain
Los Comensales		MJ Fuentes Mateos	Spain
Tengo Que Acabar el Puto TFM		Estíbaliz Burgaleta, Andrea Casaseca	Spain
The Merchant		Gabriel Campoy, Guillem Lafoz	Spain
Special Sessions
Combinados de Ficción (Note: Composed of five short films: Sombras by Mateo Franco and Manuel Preto; Cabrales by Sergio Morcillo; La Respuesta de Lópe de Vega by Diana Caro; Die Sünde by Demelsa López; Benidorm Bajo el Terror de los Zombies by Manolito Motosierra)		Various directors	Spain
Ensalada de Ostias con Entrantes (Note: Composed of three short films: El Duro by Nacho Serapio; Ayuda by Andrés Amores; Papu by Jesús Loniego)		Various directors	Spain
Entre el Stop Motion, la Animación y la Distopía (Note: Composed of five short films: Junta Trimestral by Pablo Llorens; Feroz by Jorge Chavero; Antes de Morir, La Sombra del Wendigo by Alvar Vielsa; Lapso by Cándido Pérez de Armas; Conflictivos Productions, 25 Años Fracasando con Todo Éxito by Fran Sánchez)		Various directors	Spain
Imagen DEATH (Note: Composed of the short film GERMEN (30 Anniversary) by Adrián López)		Adrián López	Spain

=== Panorama ===
The following films were selected to be screened as a part of the Panorama section, for films previously screened at non-Spanish film festivals:

English title	Original title	Director(s)	Production countrie(s)
A Mother's Embrace		Criatian Ponce	Brazil
A Samurai in Time	侍タイムスリッパー	Junichi Yasuda	Japan
Bone Lake		Mercedes Bryce Morgan	United States
Nightwatch: Demons Are Forever	Nattevagten 2 - Dæmoner går i arv	Ole Bornedal	Denmark
Estela		Adrián Araujo	Mexico, Spain
Handsome Guys	핸섬가이즈	Nam Dong-hyeop	South Korea
Historias de Halloween		Kiko Prada	Spain
Inexternal	裡應外合	Steve Yuen	Hong Kong
Kryptic		Kourtney Roy	Canada, United Kingdom
Little Bites		Spider One	United States
Mr. Crocket		Brandon Espy	United States
Noise	노이즈	Kim Soo-jin	South Korea
Oddity		Damian McCarthy	Ireland
Párvulos: Children of the Apocalypse	Párvulos: Hijos del apocalipsis	Isaac Ezband	Mexico
Peg O' My Heart	贖夢	Nicholas Cheung Ka-fai	Hong Kong
Push		David Charbonier, Justin Powell	United States
Respati	Malam Pencabut Nyawa	Sidharta Tata	Indonesia
Resvrgis		Francesco Carnesecchi	Italy
Tenement	អ្នកស្នងអគារ	Sokyou Chea, Inrasothythep Neth	Cambodia
The Beldham		Angela Gulner	United States
The Damned		Thordur Palsson	United Kingdom, Iceland, Ireland, Belgium, United States
Touched by Eternity	Mūžības skartie	Mārcis Lācis	Latvia
U Are the Universe	Ти – Космос	Pavlo Ostrikov	Ukraine, Belgium
V/H/S/Beyond		Jordan Downey, Christian Long, Justin Long, Justin Martínez, Virat Pal, Kate Siegel, Jay Cheel	United States
Within the Pines		Paul Evans Thomas	Australia

=== Serial Sitges ===
The following series were selected to be screened as a part of the Serial Sitges section:

English title	Original title	Director(s)	Production countrie(s)
El Mal Invisible (episodes 1 & 2)		Lluís Arcarazo Martínez	Spain
Hay Algo en el Bosque (episodes 1 & 3)		Nicolás Amelio-Ortiz	Spain
Invisible (episodes 1 & 2)		Paco Caballero	Spain
The Head (episodes 1 & 2, season 3)		Jorge Dorado	Spain, Japan
Shatter Belt (episodes 1, 2 & 3)		James Ward Byrkit	United States

=== Nova Autoria ===
The following films were selected to be screened as a part of the Nova Autoria section, for short films made by students from Catalan universities and film schools:

Title	Director(s)	Production countrie(s)
Flamin' Hot	Clàudia Romeo Cassadò, Paula Othmer Pérez, Alícia García Iniesta, Adrià Carballada Mallofré, Leanora Schnog Barriga, Bernardo Oliveira Mesquita, Marlon Anthony Hugo Zapata, Pol Córcoles Serra	Spain
Baile con la Muerte	Berta Alsinet, Paula Anglàs, Nuria Aranda, Martina Barney, Joan Cortit, Laia Domene, David Martin, Carlota Massó, Roger Menta, Victor Moya, Gisela Torras	Spain
Burned Out	Isa Adler	Spain
De-Sastre	Tommasso Mangiacotti, Marolyn Ávila, Constanza Melio, Maria Antonieta Fernández, Kuang Yi Lee	Spain
Lluna	Pol Mansachs	Spain
Daru/n (Passed/Mother)	Benjamin Hindrichs	Spain
Alicia Gilipollas	Gerard Miró	Spain
Asterisco	Xavi Herrera	Spain
Blava Terra	Marine Auclair March	Spain
Azadi	Lily-Eileen Uxía Baker Föhring, Juan Luis Ortega Navarrete, Luciana and Espinoza Hoempler	Spain

Highlighted title indicates Nova Autoria Best Direction-Production winner.

=== Sitges Documenta ===
The following films were selected to be screened as a part of the Sitges Documenta section:

English title	Original title	Director(s)	Production countrie(s)
Chain Reactions		Alexandre O. Philippe	United States
Deep Argento		Giancarlo Rolandi, Steve Della Casa	Italy
Exorcismo		Alberto Sedano	Spain
Grand Theft Hamlet		Pinny Grylls, Sam Crane	United Kingdom
Llámame Paul		Víctor Matellano García	Spain
Ishiro Honda: Memoirs of a Film Director		Jonathan Bellés	Spain
Super/Man: The Christopher Reeve Story		Ian Bonhôte, Peter Ettedgui	United States
Realm of Satan		Scott Cummings	United States
The Last Sacrifice		Rupert Russell	United Kingdom

=== Midnight X-Treme ===
The following films were selected to be screened as a part of the Midnight X-Treme section, for indie and extreme horror films:

English title	Original title	Director(s)	Production countrie(s)
1978		Nicolás Onetti, Luciano Onetti	Argentina
Dark Match		Lowell Dean	Canada
Die Alone		Lowell Dean	Canada
El Tema del Verano		Pablo Stoll Ward	Uruguay, Argentina, Chile
Fly Me to the Saitama: From Biwa Lake with Love	翔んで埼玉 ～琵琶湖より愛をこめて～	Hideki Takeuchi	Japan
Frankie Freako		Steven Kostanski	Canada
Grafted		Sasha Rainbow	New Zealand
Hell Hole		Toby Poser, John Adams	United States
Jimmy & Stiggs		Joe Begos	United States
Krazy House		Steffen Haars, Filip van der Kuil	Netherlands
Chainsaws Were Singing	Mootorsaed laulsid	Sander Maran	Estonia
Operation Undead		Kongkiat Komesiri	Thailand
Plastic Guns	Les Pistolets en plastique	Jean-Christophe Meurisse	France
The Beast Hand		Taichiro Natsume	Japan

=== Brigadoon ===
The following films were selected to be screened as a part of the Brigadoon section, for "independently produced feature films, documentaries and short films with horror and fantastic genre themes":

English title	Original title	Director(s)	Production countrie(s)
Premieres
Dirty Money	더러운 돈에 손대지 마라	Kim Min-soo	South Korea
The Wizard	呪禁師	Lee Shu-Mak	Japan
El Cristo de la Calavera		Chus Lara	Spain
Monster on a Plane		Erza Tsegaye	Germany
Nadie Inquietó Más: Narciso Ibáñez Menta 2.0		Gustavo Leonel Mendoza	Argentina
Traumatika		Pierre Tsigaridis	United States
Tripping the Dark Fantastic		LG White	United Kingdom
Marisa y Gamoso		Pablo Parés	Argentina
Year 10		Benjamin Goodger	United Kingdom
Documentaries
Albert Pyun: King of Cult Movies		Lisa D'Apolito	United States
Boutique: To Preserve and Collect		Ryan Bruce Levey	Canada, United States
Generation Terror		Sarah Appleton, Phillip Escott	United Kingdom
José Lifante, Mi Aventura en el Cine		David Garía Sariñera	Spain
Los Albores del Kaiju Eiga		Jonathan Bellés	Spain
Mad Props		Juan Pablo Reinoso	United States
SUZZANNA: Queen of Black Magic		David Gregory	Indonesia
Special Screenings
Carnival of Souls (1962)		Herk Harvey	United States
The Sword and the Sorcerer (1982)		Albert Pyun	United States
Crypt of the Living Dead (1973)	La tumba de la isla maldita	Julio Salvador, Ray Danton	Spain, United States
Dick Dynamite: 1944 (2023)		Robbie Davidson	United States
Kung Fu Magic (1986)		Lee Tso-Nam	Taiwan
Short Night of Glass Dolls (1971)	La Corta notte delle bambole di vetro	Aldo Lado	Italy
The Lords of Magick (1989)		David Marsh	United States
Contraband (1980)	Luca il contrabbandiere	Lucio Fulci	Italy
The Last Hunter (1980)	L'ultimo cacciatore	Antonio Margheriti	Italy
Santo vs. the Kidnappers (1972)	Santo contra los secuestradores	Federico Curiel	Mexico
Terror Circus (1973)		Alan Rudolph	United States
Four of the Apocalypse (1975)	I quattro dell'apocalisse	Lucio Fulci	Italy
The Stand (1994)		Mick Garris	United States
Thrilling Bloody Sword (1981)	神劍動山河	Chang Hsing-Yi	Taiwan
The Undead (1957)		Roger Corman	United States
Red Rings of Fear (1978)	Enigma rosso	Alberto Negrin	Italy, Spain, West Germany
Zombie 5 Killing Birds (1988)		Claudio Lattanzi	Italy
What Have You Done to Solange? (1972)	Cosa avete fatto a Solange?	Massimo Dallamano	Italy, West Germany
Who Saw Her Die? (1972)	Chi l'ha vista morire?	Aldo Lado	Italy, West Germany

=== Sitges Classics ===
The following films were selected to be screened as a part of the Sitges Classics section:

English title	Original title	Director(s)	Production countrie(s)
A Nightmare on Elm Street (1984)		Wes Craven	United States
Alien 2: On Earth (1980)		Ciro Ippolito	Italy
Beyond the Door (1974)	Chi sei?	Ovidio G. Assonitis	Italy, United States
Children of the Corn		Fritz Kiersch	United States
Count Dracula (1970)	El conde Drácula	Jesús Franco	West Germany, Spain
Dr. Jekyll and the Werewolf (1971)	Dr. Jekyll y el Hombre Lobo	León Klimovsky	Spain
Dracula, Prisoner of Frankenstein (1972)	Drácula contra Frankenstein	Jesús Franco	Spain, Portugal, Liechtenstein
Godzilla (1954)	ゴジラ	Ishirō Honda	Japan
Night of the Creeps (1986)		Fred Dekker	United States
Revolver (1973)		Sergio Sollima	Italy, West Germany, France
The Birthday (2004)		Eugenio Mira	Spain
The Dracula Saga (1973)	La saga de los Drácula	León Klimovsky	Spain
The Strange Love of the Vampires (1975)	El extraño amor de los vampiros	León Klimovsky	Spain
The Texas Chain Saw Massacre (1974)		Tobe Hooper	United States
The People Who Own the Dark (1976)	Último deseo	León Klimovsky	Spain
Seven Chances
Malpertius (1971)		Harry Kümel	Belgium, France, West Germany
Mirror, Mirror (1990)		Marina Sargenti	United States
Stone (1974)		Sandy Harbutt	Australia
The Mysterious Castle in the Carpathians (1981)	Tajemství hradu v Karpatech	Oldřich Lipský	Czechoslovakia
The Passion According to Béatrice (2024)	La passion selon Béatrice	Fabrice du Welz	France, Belgium
The Spider Labyrinth (1988)	Il nido del ragno	Gianfranco Giagni	Italy
Vampyros Lesbos (1971)	Las Vampiras	Jesús Franco	Spain, West Germany

=== Sitges Family ===
The following films were selected to be screened as a part of the Sitges Family section, dedicated to film literacy for young people:

English title	Original title	Director(s)	Production countrie(s)
Sitges Family – Kids
A Guest from Elsewhere		Ethan Anderson	United States
Abah and His Band	Abá e Sua Banda	Humberto Avelar	Brazil
Bird Drone		Radheya Jegatheva	Australia
Bottle George		Daisuke "Dice" Tsutsumi	Japan
Bufet Paradís		Héctor Zafra, Santi Amézqueta	Spain, France
Candy Puppet		Angela Lorena Statnik	United States, Colombia, Mexico, Argentina
Capitán Avispa		Jean Gabriel Guerra, Jonnathan Melendez	Dominican Republic
Cuando Llegue la Inundación		Antonio Lomas	Spain
Dagon		Paolo Gaudio	Italy
El Atrapasueños		Guillermo Patrikios Alum	Spain
Lonely Castle in the Mirror	かがみの孤城	Keiichi Hara	Japan
Fagnes 1986		Nicolas Monfort	Belgium
Fan		Erik Lee	Taiwan
Flocky		Esther Casas Roura	Spain, United States
Freelance		Luciano A. Muñoz Sessarego, Magnus Igland Møller, Peter Smith	Denmark, Chile
Gaomei Fantasy		Wen Chin Juo	Taiwan
Garu & Ponki		Cristhian Jallier	Colombia
Gizaki		Xanti Rodríguez	Spain
Green Night		Han Shuai	Hong Kong
Hammertime		Jan Mocka	Germany
Haru-tsuge Fish and Fu-rai Boy		Takeshi Yashiro	Japan
Idiot Girls and School Ghost: School Anniversary	아메바 소녀들과 학교괴담: 개교기념일	Kim Min-ha	South Korea
Iris de Cristal		Diego Gaviria	Colombia
John Vardar vs the Galaxy		Goce Cvetanovski	North Macedonia, Hungary, Bulgaria, Croatia
Kit & Spoon and the Wayward Moon		Olivia Moe	United States
La Gran Cita de Conej		Pablo Río	Spain
Las Aventuras del Pequeño Colón		Rodrigo Gava	Brazil
Malas Hierbas		Daniel Tornero	Spain
Mû		Malin Neumann	Germany
Neon Vowels		Sergio Caballero	United States
Pasos para Volar		Rosario Carlino, Nicolás Conte	Argentina, France
Pigsy		Li Wei Chiu	Taiwan
Quadrilateral	Cuadrilátero	Daniel Rodríguez Risco	Peru
Sincopat		Pol Diggler	Spain
SuperKlaus		Steve Majaury, Andrea Sebastiá	Spain, Canada
The Human Fossil		Rebecca Huang	United States, Canada
The Siren	La Sirène	Sepideh Farsi	France, Germany, Luxembourg, Belgium
The Worlds Divide		Denver Jackson	Canada
A Pleasure	Un placer	Sonia Estévez	Spain
Sitges Family – Kids en Acció
Animalia		Sofia Alaoui	France, Morocco, Qatar
Saleem		Cynthia Madanat Sharaiha	Jordan
Croma Kid		Pablo Chea	Dominican Republic
Sitges Family – Teens
Isla Monstro		Steven Shea	United States
LAVA 2 (El Nuevo Show del Narciso)		Ayar Blasco	Argentina

=== Retrospective ===
The following films were selected to be screened as a part of the Retrospective section, intended to celebrate Tod Browning's 1932 horror film Freaks:

English title	Original title	Director(s)	Production countrie(s)
Freaks (1932)		Tod Browning	United States
House of 1000 Corpses (2003)		Rob Zombie	United States
The Funhouse (1981)		Tobe Hooper	United States
The Incredibly Strange Creatures Who Stopped Living and Became Mixed-Up Zombies (1964)		Ray Dennis Steckler	United States
The Last Circus (2010)	Balada triste de trompeta	Álex de la Iglesia	Spain
The Magician (1958)	Ansiktet	Ingmar Bergman	Sweden
The Unknown (1927)		Tod Browning	United States
Santa Sangre (1989)		Alejandro Jodorowsky	Mexico, Italy

== Awards ==
The following awards were presented at the 57th Edition:

=== Official competition ===
- Best Feature Film: The Devil's Bath by Veronika Franz and Severin Fiala
- Special Jury Award: Exhuma by Jang Jae-hyun
- Best Direction: Soi Cheang for Twilight of the Warriors: Walled In
- Best Actress: Kristine Froseth for Desert Road
- Best Actor: John Lithgow & Geoffrey Rush for The Rule of Jenny Pen
- Best Screenplay: Aaron Schimberg for A Different Man
- Best Special, Visual or Makeup Effects: Digital District & Machina Infinitum for Else
- Best Music: Die Hewen for Fréwaka
- Best Cinematography: Giovanni Ribisi for Strange Darling

=== Noves Visions ===
- Best Film: A Desert by Joshua Erkman
- Best Direction: Grazia Tricarico by Body Odyssey
- Best Short Film: Say Wuff! by Fabian Podeszwa

=== Méliès d'Argent ===
- Méliès d'Argent Award for the Best Fantastic Genre Feature Film: Animale by Emma Benestan
- Méliès d'Argent Award for the Best European Fantastic Genre Short Film: Meat Puppet by Eros V

=== Anima't ===
- Best Animated Feature Film: Memoir of a Snail by Adam Elliot
- Best Animated Short Film: Free the Chickens by Matúš Vizár

=== Òrbita ===
- Best Feature Film: Zero by Jean Luc Herbulot

=== Critic's Jury ===
- José Luis Guarner Critics' Award for Best Film in the SOFC: The Devil's Bath by Veronika Franz and Severin Fiala
- Citizen Kane Award for Best New Director: Thibault Emin for Else
- Best Short Film in the SOFC: Chew by Félix Dobaire

=== Brigadoon ===
- Brigadoon Paul Naschy Award for the Best Short Film: Céntrico by Luso Martínez

=== SGAE Nova Autoria ===
- Best Direction-Production: Blava Terra by Marine Auclair & Daru/n by Benjamin Hindrichs
- Best Screenplay: Benjamin Hindrichs for Daru/n
- Best Original Music: Yuliya Protasova for De-Sastre

=== Carnet Jove Jury ===
- Best Feature Film in the SOFC: The Devil's Bath by Veronika Franz and Severin Fiala
- Best Sitges Documenta Film: Grand Theft Hamlet by Pinny Grylls & Sam Crane

=== People' Choice Award ===
- Grand People's Choice Award for Best Feature Film in the SOFC: Strange Darling by JT Mollner
- Panorama Fantàstic People's Choice Award: Handsome Guys by Nam Dong-hyeop
- Sitges Collection People's Choice Award: Dead Talents Society by John Hsu
- Focus Asia People's Choice Award: Dead Talents Society by John Hsu
- Midnight X-Treme People's Choice Award: Die Alone by Lowell Dean

=== Other awards ===
- Blood Window Award for Best Feature Film: Mi Bestia by Camila Beltrán

=== Special awards ===
- Honorary Grand Prize: Geoffrey Rush
- Time Machine Award: Alexandre Aja, Nick Frost, Mike Flanagan, Corey Feldman, Heather Langenkamp, Ovidio G. Assonitis, Fred Dekker, Giancarlo Esposito
- Nosferatu Award: Fabio Testi
- Méliès Career Award: Christophe Gans
- WomanInFan Award: Mar Targarona
