= 2024 South by Southwest Film & TV Festival =

Edition of film and television festival

South by Southwest
- Location: Austin, Texas, U.S.
- Founded: 1987
- Hosted by: SXSW, LLC.
- Festival date: March 8–16, 2024
- Language: English
- Website: www.sxsw.com
- 2025 2023

The 2024 South by Southwest Film & TV Festival took place from March 8 to 16 at several venues in Austin, Texas, as part of the larger South by Southwest annual event. The festival opened with the film Road House and the TV series 3 Body Problem. It closed with the films Civil War and The Idea Of You. The event included screenings of 118 feature films, 80 short films, and seven TV premieres.

== Feature films ==
**Bold**	Indicates recipient of the Jury Award
^{†}	Indicates recipient of the Audience Award

=== Headliner ===
English title	Director(s)	Production country
Babes	Pamela Adlon	United States
Civil War	Alex Garland	United States, United Kingdom
The Fall Guy	David Leitch	United States
The Idea of You	Michael Showalter	United States
Immaculate	Michael Mohan	United States
Monkey Man^{†}	Dev Patel	United States, India
Road House	Doug Liman	United States
Y2K	Kyle Mooney	United States

=== Narrative Feature Competition ===
English title	Director(s)	Production country
Audrey	Natalie Bailey	Australia
Ben and Suzanne, A Reunion in 4 Parts	Shaun Seneviratne	United States
The Black Sea	Crystal Moselle, Derrick B. Harden	United States, Bulgaria
**Bob Trevino Likes It**^{†}	**Tracie Laymon**	**United States**
Mamifera	Liliana Torres	Spain
We Strangers	Anu Valia	United States
We Were Dangerous	Josephine Stewart-Te Whiu	New Zealand
We're All Gonna Die	Freddie Wong, Matthew Arnold	United States

=== Documentary Feature Competition ===
English title	Director(s)	Production country
A House Is Not a Disco	Brian J. Smith	United States
An Army of Women	Julie Lunde Lillesæter	Germany, Norway
**Grand Theft Hamlet**	**Pinny Grylls, Sam Crane**	**United Kingdom**
The In Between	Robie Flores	United States, Mexico
Resynator^{†}	Alison Tavel	United States
Roleplay	Katie Mathews	United States
Swamp Dogg Gets His Pool Painted	Isaac Gale, Ryan Olson	United States
We Can Be Heroes	Carina Mia Wong, Alex Simmons	United States

=== Narrative Spotlight ===
English title	Director(s)	Production country
A Nice Indian Boy	Roshan Sethi	United States
Arcadian	Ben Brewer	Ireland
Cold Wallet	Cutter Hodierne	United States
Cuckoo	Tilman Singer	Germany
Desert Road	Shannon Triplett	United States
Doin' It	Sara Zandieh	United States
The Greatest Hits	Ned Benson	United States
The Gutter	Yassir Lester, Isaiah Lester	United States
High Tide	Marco Calvani	United States
I Don't Understand You	Brian Crano, David Craig	United States
I Love You Forever	Cazzie David, Elisa Kalani	United States
I Wish You All The Best	Tommy Dorfman	United States
Magpie	Sam Yates	United Kingdom
Música	Rudy Mancuso	United States
My Dead Friend Zoe^{†}	Kyle Hausmann-Stokes	United States
Omni Loop	Bernardo Britto	United States
Switch Up	Tara Pirnia	United States
Timestalker	Alice Lowe	United Kingdom
Turtles	David Lambert	Canada, Belgium
The Uninvited	Nadia Conners	United States
Wakhri	Iram Parveen Bilal	Pakistan
Yasmeen's Element	Amman Abbasi	United States, Pakistan

=== Documentary Spotlight ===
English title	Director(s)	Production country
7 Beats per Minute	Yuqi Kang	Canada
A King Like Me	Matthew O. Henderson	United States
The Antisocial Network	Giorgio Angelini, Arthur Jones	United States
Billy & Molly: An Otter Love Story	Charlie Hamilton James	United States
Brandy Hellville & the Cult of Fast Fashion	Eva Orner	United States
Cheech & Chong's Last Movie	David Bushell	United States
Clemente^{†}	David Altrogge	United States
Dickweed	Jonathan Ignatius Green	United States
Fly	Shaul Schwarz, Christina Clusiau	United States
The Hobby	Simon Ennis	Canada
How Music Got Free	Alexandria Stapleton	United States
How To Build A Truth Engine	Friedrich Moser	Austria
Lions of Mesopotamia	Lucian Read	United States
Plastic People	Ben Addelman, Ziya Tong	Canada
Preconceived	Sabrine Keane, Kate Dumke	United States
Secret Mall Apartment	Jeremy Workman	United States
Shaking It Up: The Life and Times of Liz Carpenter	Abby Ginzberg, Christy Carpenter	United States
She Looks Like Me	Torquil Jones	United Kingdom
MoviePass, MovieCrash	Muta'Ali	United States
Stormy	Sarah Gibson	United States
The Truth vs. Alex Jones	Dan Reed	United States
Whatever it Takes	Jenny Carchman	United Kingdom

=== Midnighter ===
English title	Director(s)	Production country
Azrael	E. L. Katz	United States
Family	Benjamin Finkel	United States
Hood Witch	Saïd Belktibia	France
Hunting Daze	Annick Blanc	Canada
It's What's Inside	Greg Jardin	United States
Kryptic	Kourtney Roy	Canada, United Kingdom
Oddity^{†}	Damian McCarthy	Ireland
Things Will Be Different	Michael Felker	United States

=== Visions ===
English title	Director(s)	Production country
7 Keys	Joy Wilkinson	United Kingdom
Adrianne and the Castle	Shannon Walsh	Canada
Birdeater	Jack Clark, Jim Weir	Australia
Dead Mail	Kyle McConaghy, Joe DeBoer	United States
Doppelgängers^{3}	Nelly Ben Hayoun-Stépanian	United States, Algeria, Armenia, France, United Kingdom
Dory Previn: On My Way To Where	Julia Greenberg, Dianna Dilworth	United States
Sew Torn	Freddy Macdonald	United States, Switzerland
Songs from the Hole^{†}	Contessa Gayles	United States
The Trouble With Mr Doodle	Ed Perkins, Jaimie D'Cruz	United Kingdom

=== 24 Beats Per Second ===
English title	Director(s)	Production country
Any Other Way: The Jackie Shane Story	Michael Mabbott, Lucah Rosenberg-Lee	Canada
Billy Preston: That's The Way God Planned It	Paris Barclay	United States
Dandelion	Nicole Riegel	United States
Diane Warren: Relentless	Bess Kargman	United States
Faders Up: The John Aielli Experience^{†}	David Hartstein, Sam Wainwright Douglas	United States
Freaknik: The Wildest Party Never Told	P. Frank Williams	United States
Mogwai: If The Stars Had A Sound	Antony Crook	United Kingdom
Omar and Cedric: If This Ever Gets Weird	Nicolas Jack Davies	Germany
This is a Film About The Black Keys	Jeff Dupre	United States
The World According to Allee Willis	Alexis Spraic	United States

=== Global ===
English title	Director(s)	Production country
Bionico's Bachata^{†}	Yoel Morales	Dominican Republic
Krzyk - Losing Control	Ewa Wikiel	Germany
Malta	Natalia Santa	Argentina, Colombia, Norway
My Sextortion Diary	Patricia Franquesa	Spain
Natatorium	Helena Stefánsdóttir	Iceland

=== Festival Favorite ===
English title	Director(s)	Production country
Backspot	D. W. Waterson	Canada
Black Box Diaries	Shiori Itō	United States, Japan, United Kingdom
Dìdi (弟弟)	Sean Wang	Taiwan
Every Little Thing	Sally Aitken	Australia
Gasoline Rainbow	Bill Ross IV, Turner Ross	United States
Ghostlight	Kelly O'Sullivan, Alex Thompson	United States
Girls Will Be Girls	Shuchi Talati	India
I Saw the TV Glow	Jane Schoenbrun	United States
Kneecap	Rich Peppiatt	Ireland, United Kingdom
Love Machina	Peter Sillen	United States
The Moogai	Jon Bell	Australia
Never Look Away	Lucy Lawless	New Zealand
Pet Shop Days	Olmo Schnabel	Italy, United Kingdom, United States
The Queen of My Dreams	Fawzia Mirza	Canada
Sasquatch Sunset	David Zellner, Nathan Zellner	United States
Sing Sing^{†}	Greg Kwedar	United States
Smugglers	Ryoo Seung-wan	South Korea
Toll	Carolina Markowicz	Brazil

== Short films ==
**Bold**	Indicates recipient of the Jury Award
^{†}	Indicates recipient of the Audience Award

=== Narrative Short Competition ===
English title	Director(s)	Production country
A Rotten Woman (Die Verdorbene)	Niamh Sauter-Cooke	Germany
Beach Logs Kill	Haley Z. Boston	United States
Bits	Lilliya Scarlett Reid	United States
Caller Number Nine!	Sandy Honig	United Kingdom
Can^{†}	Kailee McGee	United States
**Dissolution**	**Anthony Saxe**	**United States, Australia**
If I Die in America	Ward Kamel	United States, Puerto Rico
The Last Brunch	Jim Cummings	United States
Learning English	Jean Liu	United States, United Kingdom
Let	Alyssa Loh	United States
Los Mosquitos	Nicole Chi	United States, Costa Rica
My Tomato Heart	Benoît Le Rouzès Ménard	Canada
The Rainbow Bridge	Dimitri Simakis	United States
The Robbers	Isa Schieche	Austria
Say Hi After You Die	Kate Jean Hollowell	United States
See It Say It	Nez Khammal	United Kingdom
Shé (Snake)	Renee Zhan	United Kingdom
Sound and Colour	Emma Foley	Ireland
Trapped	Sam Cutler-Kreutz, David Cutler-Kreutz	United States
We Are Not Alone	Adebukola Bodunrin	Canada, United States
Your Ears (À toi les oreilles)	Alexandre Isabelle	Canada

=== Documentary Short Competition ===
English title	Director(s)	Production country
Been There	Corina Schwingruber Ilić	Switzerland
The Big Wait	Yannick Jamey	Australia
Christmas, Every Day	Faye Tsakas	United States
Frank^{†}	David Gauvey Herbert	United States
Hello Stranger	Amélie Hardy	Canada
Leonie, Skeet & de biggen (Leonie, Skeet & the piglets)	Jip Heijenga	Belgium
Pamilya	Miles Blacket	United Kingdom
The Puzzle Palace	Jenny Schweitzer Bell, Brian Bell	United States
**Remember, Broken Crayons Colour Too**	**Shannet Clemmings, Urša Kastelic**	**Switzerland**
Sandcastles	Carin Jin-Yi Leong	United States
The School of Canine Massage	Emma D. Miller	United States
Shotplayer	Sam Shainberg	United States
We Ride for Her	Prairie Rose Seminole, Katrina Lillian Sorrentino	United States
Wouldn't Make It Any Other Way	Hao Zhou	United States

=== Animated Short Competition ===
English title	Director(s)	Production country
A Crab in the Pool^{†}	Alexandra Myotte, Jean-Sébastien Hamel	Canada
Au 8ème Jour	Agathe Sénéchal, Alicia Massez	France
Beautiful Men	Nicolas Keppens	Belgium, France, Netherlands
Bug Diner	Phoebe Jane Hart	United States
La Perra	Carla Melo Gampert	Colombia, France
Matta and Matto	Bianca Caderas, Kerstin Zemp	Switzerland
Sweetmeats	George Metaxas	United States, Australia
Tennis, Oranges	Sean Pecknold	United States
This is TMI	Subarna Dash, Vidushi Gupta	India
**Wander to Wonder**	**Nina Gantz**	**Belgium, France, Netherlands**

=== Midnight Short Competition ===
English title	Director(s)	Production country
Apotemnofilia	Jano Pita	Spain
The Bleacher	Nicole Daddona, Adam Wilder	United States
Dream Creep	Carlos A.F. Lopez	United States
Inner Demons	Jasmine J. Johnson	United States
Lullaby	Chi Thai	United Kingdom
Make Me a Pizza	Talia Shea Levin	United States
Meat Puppet^{†}	Eros V	United Kingdom
Tight	Jessica Barr	United States
**Transylvanie**	**Rodrigue Huart**	**France**

=== Texas Short Competition ===
English title	Director(s)	Production country
Beeps	Kirk Johnson	United States
Hair Care	Fatima Wardy	United States
**Jedo's Dead**	**Sara Nimeh**	**United States**
Live From the Clouds	Mackie Mallison	United States
The Passing	Ivete Lucas, Patrick Bresnan	United States
The Queen vs Texas	Emil Lozada, Raemonn James	United States
Sangre Violenta / Sangre Violeta^{†}	Edna Diaz, Arturo R. Jiménez	Mexico

== Television ==
**Bold**	Indicates recipient of the Jury Award
^{†}	Indicates recipient of the Audience Award

=== TV Premiere ===
English title	Created by	Production country
3 Body Problem	David Benioff, D.B. Weiss, Alexander Woo	United States
Black Twitter: A People's History	Prentice Penny	United States
Jerrod Carmichael Reality Show	Ari Katcher	United States
Photographer: Dan Winters	Pagan Danielle Harleman	United States
Ren Faire	Lance Oppenheim	United States
STAX: Soulsville, U.S.A.^{†}	Jamila Wignot	United States
Thank You, Goodnight: The Bon Jovi Story	Gotham Chopra	United States

=== TV Spotlight ===
English title	Created by	Production country
Hacks^{†}	Paul W. Downs, Lucia Aniello, Jen Statsky	United States
Long Time Sun	Joanna Forscher, Chloe Chapman	United States
The Broadcast	Natalie Palamides, Courtney Pauroso	United States
The Long Long Night	Barret O'Brien	United States
Penelope	Mel Eslyn	United States
Ryley Walker & Friends	Mark Duplass	United States
Magic City: An American Fantasy	Bayan Joonam	United States
Star Trek: Discovery	Alex Kurtzman, Michelle Paradise	United States

=== Independent TV Competition ===
English title	Created by	Production country
Bettendorf Talks	David Pasquesi, T.J. Jagodowski	United States
Halfrican American	Zeke Nicholson	United States
Lucy & Sara	Susan Park	United States
**Marvin Is Sorry**	**Brett Morrow, Alex Gehrlein, Jack Gacek**	**United States**
Neo-Dome^{†}	Bonnie Discepolo	United States
Tossers	Chase Block, Bryce Van Leuven	United States

== Venues ==
Films and shows at SXSW were screened at eight venues:

- Paramount Theatre
- Zach Theatre
- Stateside Theatre
- Rollins Theatre at The Long Center
- Alamo Drafthouse Lamar
- Fairmont Hotel
- Violet Crown Cinema
- AFS Cinema (satellite venue)
