= 2024 BFI London Film Festival =

68th BFI London Film Festival
- Opening film: Blitz
- Closing film: Piece by Piece
- Location: London, United Kingdom
- Founded: 1957
- Festival date: 9–20 October 2024
- Website: whatson.bfi.org.uk/lff/Online/default.asp

BFI London Film Festival
- 2025 2023

The 68th BFI London Film Festival was a film festival that took place from 9–20 October 2024. The competition films were announced on 29 August 2024 while the films for the galas and the strands were revealed on 4 September 2024.

Steve McQueen's historical drama Blitz opened the festival on 9 October 2024, being the third film by McQueen to do so after Widows in 2018 and Mangrove in 2020. Morgan Neville's animated documentary film Piece by Piece closed the festival on 20 October 2024.

== Juries ==
The jury members were as follows:

=== Main Competition ===
- Alexandre O. Philippe, Swiss film director – Jury president
- Manori Ravindran, English trade journalist
- Reinaldo Marcus Green, American filmmaker

=== First Feature Competition (Sutherland Award) ===
- Dionne Edwards, British filmmaker – Jury president
- Julia Weigl, artistic co-director of the Munich Film Festival
- Bernardo Rondeau, curator of Film Programs at the Lucas Museum of Narrative Art and former Senior Director of Film Programs for the Academy Museum of Motion Pictures

=== Documentary Competition (Grierson Award) ===
- June Givanni, Guyanese-British curator, archivist, and founder of the June Givanni Pan-African Cinema Archive – Jury president
- Ella Glendining, British writer and director
- Raul Niño Zambrano, creative director of Sheffield DocFest

=== Short Film Competition ===
- Chloe Abrahams, Sri Lankan-British writer and director – Jury president
- Simisolaoluwa Akande, British director
- George Jaques, British filmmaker

== Venues ==
The partner venues for the festival included:

=== London cinemas ===
- BFI Southbank
- BFI IMAX
- Curzon Mayfair
- Curzon Soho
- Institute of Contemporary Arts (ICA)
- Prince Charles Cinema
- Southbank Centre's Royal Festival Hall
- Vue West End
- Picturehouse Central - Press and industry screenings

=== Expanded venues ===
- Bargehouse at Oxo Tower Wharf
- Outernet
- Theatre Avenue

=== UK-wide cinemas ===
- Broadway Cinema, Nottingham
- Chapter, Cardiff
- Glasgow Film Theatre, Glasgow
- HOME, Manchester
- Midlands Arts Centre (MAC), Birmingham
- Queen's Film Theatre, Belfast
- Showroom Cinema, Sheffield
- Tyneside Cinema, Newcastle upon Tyne
- Watershed, Bristol

== Official Selection ==
=== Galas ===
The following films were selected for the Galas section, which screens world, European, and British premieres:

English Title	Original Title	Director(s)	Country(s)
Opening Night Gala
Blitz		Steve McQueen	The United Kingdom and the United States
Closing Night Gala
Piece by Piece		Morgan Neville	The United States
American Express Gala
Elton John: Never Too Late		R. J. Cutler and David Furnish	The United States
Mayor of London's Gala
We Live in Time		John Crowley	France and the United Kingdom
Cunard Gala
Joy		Ben Taylor	The United Kingdom
BFI Patron's Gala
Hard Truths		Mike Leigh	Spain and the United Kingdom
Family Gala
That Christmas		Simon Otto	The United Kingdom
Headline Gala
Anora		Sean Baker	The United States
The Apprentice		Ali Abbasi	Canada, Denmark and Ireland
Bird		Andrea Arnold	The United Kingdom, France, Germany and the United States
Conclave		Edward Berger	The United Kingdom and the United States
Emilia Pérez		Jacques Audiard	France
Maria		Pablo Larraín	Italy, Germany and the United States
Nightbitch		Marielle Heller	The United States
The Room Next Door	La habitación de al lado	Pedro Almodóvar	Spain

=== Special Presentations ===
The following films were selected for the Special Presentations section:

English Title	Original Title	Director(s)	Production Country
All We Imagine As Light		Payal Kapadia	France, India, Netherlands, Luxembourg
The Ballad of Suzanne Césaire		Madeleine Hunt-Ehrlich	United States
Dahomey		Mati Diop	France, Senegal, Benin
Endurance		Elizabeth Chai Vasarhelyi, Jimmy Chin, Natalie Hewit	United Kingdom, United States
Harvest		Athina Rachel Tsangari	United Kingdom, Germany, Greece, France, United States
I’m Still Here	Ainda Estou Aqui	Walter Salles	Brazil, France
A Nice Indian Boy (BFI Flare Special Presentation)		Roshan Sethi	United States, Canada
Nickel Boys		RaMell Ross	United States
The Piano Lesson		Malcolm Washington	United States
Queer		Luca Guadagnino	Italy, United States
A Real Pain		Jesse Eisenberg	United States, Poland
The Seed of the Sacred Fig	دانه‌ی انجیر معابد	Mohammad Rasoulof	Iran, Germany, France
Silent Sherlock (1921–1923)		Maurice Elvey, George Ridgwell	United Kingdom
The Summer Book		Charlie McDowell	Finland, United Kingdom
The Wild Robot		Chris Sanders	United States

=== In Competition ===
There were four competition sections, each with a different selection of films and different juries.

==== Official Competition ====
The following films competed for the Best Film Award:

English Title	Original Title	Director(s)	Production Country
April		Dea Kulumbegashvili	France, Italy, Georgia
Bring Them Down		Christopher Andrews	Ireland, United Kingdom, Belgium
The Extraordinary Miss Flower		Iain Forsyth and Jane Pollard	United Kingdom
Four Mothers		Colin Thornton, Darren Thornton	Ireland, United Kingdom
Living in Two Worlds	ぼくが生きてる、ふたつの世界	Mipo O	Japan
Memoir of a Snail		Adam Elliot	Australia
On Becoming a Guinea Fowl		Rungano Nyoni	Zambia, United Kingdom, Ireland
Thank You for Banking With Us		Laila Abbas	Palestine, Germany
Under the Volcano	Pod wulkanem	Damian Kocur	Poland
Vermiglio		Maura Delpero	Italy, France, Belgium
The Wolves Always Come at Night	Чоно үүр шөнөөр ирдэг	Gabrielle Brady	Australia, Mongolia, Germany

Highlighted title indicates the section winner.

==== First Feature Competition ====
The following films competed for the Sutherland Award, which is awarded to a directorial debut:

English Title	Original Title	Director(s)	Production Country
Crocodile Tears		Tumpal Tampubolon	Indonesia, France, Singapore, Germany
Hanami		Denise Fernandes	Switzerland, Portugal, Cape Verde
Happyend		Neo Sora	Japan, United States
Last Swim		Sasha Nathwani	United Kingdom
My Eternal Summer	Min evige sommer	Sylvia Le Fanu	Denmark
Olivia & the Clouds	Olivia & Las Nubes	Tomás Pichardo Espaillat	Dominican Republic
On Falling		Laura Carreira	United Kingdom, Portugal
Santosh		Sandhya Suri	United Kingdom, France, Germany
September Says		Ariane Labed	Ireland, United Kingdom, Germany
To a Land Unknown		Mahdi Fleifel	United Kingdom, Palestine, France, Greece, Netherlands, Germany, Qatar, Saudi Arabia
Who Do I Belong To	ماء العين	Meryam Joobeur	Tunisia, France, Canada, Norway, Qatar, Saudi Arabia

Highlighted title indicates the section winner.

==== Documentary Competition ====
The following films competed for the Grierson Award, which is awarded to a feature-length documentary.

English Title	Original Title	Director(s)	Production Country
Collective Monologue	Monólogo colectivo	Jessica Sarah Rinland	Argentina, United Kingdom
Holloway		Sophie Compton, Daisy-May Hudson	United Kingdom
Kamay		Ilyas Yourish, Shahrokh Bikaran	Afghanistan, Belgium, France, Germany
Mother Vera		Cécile Embleton, Alys Tomlinson	United Kingdom
Rising Up at Night	Tongo Saa	Nelson Makengo	Democratic Republic of Congo, Belgium, Germany, Burkina Faso, Qatar
Seeking Mavis Beacon		Jazmin Renée Jones	United States
The Shadow Scholars		Eloise King	United Kingdom
Witches		Elizabeth Sankey	United Kingdom

Highlighted title indicates the section winner.

==== Short Film Competition ====
The following films competed for the Short Film Award.

English Title	Original Title	Director(s)	Production Country
Adura Baba Mi		Juliana Kasumu	United Kingdom
Cold Snap		Ellen Evans	United Kingdom
Dragfox		Lisa Ott	United Kingdom
I Don't Want to Be Just a Memory		Sarnt Utamachote	Germany
Magic Candies	Amedama	Nishio Daisuke	Japan
Mother's Day		Emily Burnett	United Kingdom
See It, Say It		Nez Khammal	United Kingdom
Stomach Bug		Matty Crawford	United Kingdom
Two Refusals (Would We Recognize Ourselves Unbroken?)		Suneil Sanzgiri	United States
Vibrations from Gaza		Rehab Nazzal	Palestine, Canada

Highlighted title indicates the section winner.

=== Strands ===
Most of the out-of-competition films have been organised into strands, each based on a different mood or emotion.

==== Love ====
English Title	Original Title	Director(s)	Production Country
All of You		William Bridges	United Kingdom
All Shall Be Well	從今以後	Ray Yeung	Hong Kong
At Averroès & Rosa Parks	Averroès & Rosa Parks	Nicolas Philibert	France
Grand Tour		Miguel Gomes	Portugal, Italy, France
I'm Your Venus		Kimberly Reed	United States
Motherboard		Victoria Mapplebeck	United Kingdom
Patrice: The Movie		Ted Passon	United States
Pavements		Alex Ross Perry	United States
Queens of Drama	Les Reines du drame	Alexis Langlois	France, Belgium
Sex		Dag Johan Haugerud	Norway
Tarika	Стадото	Milko Lazarov	Bulgaria, Germany, Luxembourg
Weightless	Sulla terra leggeri	Sara Fgaier	Italy
When Fall Is Coming	Quand vient l'automne	François Ozon	France
When the Light Breaks	Ljósbrot	Rúnar Rúnarsson	Iceland, Netherlands, Croatia, France

==== Debate ====
English Title	Original Title	Director(s)	Production Country
2073		Asif Kapadia	United Kingdom
Black Box Diaries		Shiori Itō	Japan, United States, United Kingdom
The Cats of Gokogu Shrine	Gokōgu no Neko	Kazuhiro Soda	Japan, United States
Families like Ours	Familier som vores	Thomas Vinterberg	Denmark, France, Sweden, Czechia, Belgium, Norway, Germany
I'm Nevenka	Soy Nevenka	Icíar Bollaín	Spain
The Invasion		Sergei Loznitsa	Netherlands, France, United States
Israel Palestine on Swedish TV 1958-1989		Göran Hugo Olsson	Sweden, Finland, Denmark
Julie Keeps Quiet	Julie zwijgt	Leonardo Van Dijl	Belgium, Sweden
The Listeners		Jordan Tannahill	United Kingdom
Three Kilometres to the End of the World	Trei kilometri până la capătul lumii	Emanuel Pârvu	Romania
Youth (Homecoming)	青春	Wang Bing	France, Luxembourg, Netherlands

==== Laugh ====
English Title	Original Title	Director(s)	Production Country
Audrey		Natalie Bailey	Australia
The Gutter		Yassir Lester, Isaiah Lester	United States
The Other Way Around	Volveréis	Jonás Trueba	Spain, France
Rumours		Guy Maddin, Evan Johnson, Galen Johnson	Germany, Canada
Sofa, So Good		Kyle Thiele, Eli Thiele, Cole Thiele	United States
A Traveler's Needs	여행자의 필요	Hong Sang-soo	South Korea
Triumph	Триумф	Kristina Grozeva, Petar Valchanov	Bulgaria, Greece
Universal Language	Une langue universelle / آواز بوقلمون	Matthew Rankin	Canada

==== Dare ====
English Title	Original Title	Director(s)	Production Country
Bionico's Bachata	La bachata de Bionico	Yoel Morales	Dominican Republic
Caught by the Tides	风流一代	Jia Zhangke	China
Cidade; Campo		Juliana Rojas	Brazil, Germany, France
Diciannove		Giovanni Tortorici	Italy, United Kingdom
Don't Cry, Butterfly	Mu’a trên cánh bU’ó’m	Dương Diệu Linh	Vietnam, Singapore, Philippines, Indonesia
Eight Postcards from Utopia	Opt ilustrate din lumea ideală	Radu Jude, Christian Ferencz-Flatz	Romania
Familiar Touch		Sarah Friedland	United States
Fire of Wind	Fogo do Vento	Marta Mateus	Portugal, Switzerland, France
My Stolen Planet	Sayyareye dozdide shodeye man	Farahnaz Sharifi	Germany, Iran
The Nights Still Smell of Gunpowder	As Noites Ainda Cheiram a Pólvora	Inadelso Cossa	Mozambique, France, Germany, Portugal, Netherlands, Norway
Pepe		Nelson Carlo De Los Santos Arias	Dominican Republic, Namibia, Germany, France
Formosa Beach	Praia Formosa	Julia de Simone	Portugal, Brazil
Sanatorium Under the Sign of the Hourglass		Brothers Quay	United Kingdom, Poland, Germany
Soundtrack to a Coup d'Etat		Johan Grimonprez	Belgium, France, Netherlands
Sugar Island		Johanné Gómez Terrero	Dominican Republic, Spain
Việt and Nam	Trong lòng đất	Minh Quý Trương	Vietnam, Philippines, France, Singapore, Netherlands, Italy, Germany

==== Thrill ====
English Title	Original Title	Director(s)	Production Country
Aïcha		Mehdi M. Barsaoui	Tunisia, France, Italy, Saudi Arabia, Qatar
Architecton		Viktor Kossakovsky	Germany, France
La cocina		Alonso Ruizpalacios	Mexico, United States
Eat the Night		Caroline Poggi, Jonathan Vinel	France
Ghost Trail	Les Fantômes	Jonathan Millet	France, Germany, Belgium
Maldoror		Fabrice Du Welz	Belgium, France
Marco, the Invented Truth	Marco, la verdad inventada	Aitor Arregi, Jon Garaño	Spain
Misericordia	Miséricorde	Alain Guiraudie	France, Spain, Portugal
Skincare		Austin Peters	United States
Stranger Eyes	默視錄	Yeo Siew Hua	Singapore, Taiwan, France, United States
A Thousand Blows		Steven Knight	United Kingdom

==== Cult ====
English Title	Original Title	Director(s)	Production Country
The Balconettes	Les Femmes au balcon	Noémie Merlant	France
Bury Your Dead	Enterre Seus Mortos	Marco Dutra	Brazil
Chain Reactions		Alexandre O. Philippe	United States
Fréwaka		Aislinn Clarke	Ireland
Sister Midnight		Karan Kandhari	United Kingdom
The Surfer		Lorcan Finnegan	Australia, Ireland
The Wailing	El llanto	Pedro Martín-Calero	Spain, Argentina, France
The Weekend		Daniel Oriahi	Nigeria

==== Journey ====
English Title	Original Title	Director(s)	Production Country
After the Long Rains	Baada Ya Masika	Damien Hauser	Kenya, Switzerland
The Assessment		Fleur Fortuné	United Kingdom, Germany, United States
Baby		Marcelo Caetano	Brazil
Eephus		Carson Lund	France, United States
Ellis Park		Justin Kurzel	Australia
The End		Joshua Oppenheimer	Denmark, Germany, Ireland, Italy, United Kingdom, Sweden
Flow		Gints Zilbalodis	Latvia, Belgium, France
Good One		India Donaldson	United States
Layla		Amrou Al-Kadhi	United Kingdom
Look into My Eyes		Lana Wilson	United States
My Everything	Mon inséparable	Anne-Sophie Bailly	France
Sebastian		Mikko Mäkelä	United Kingdom, Belgium, Finland
Shambhala		Min Bahadur Bham	Nepal, France, Norway, Turkey, Hong Kong, Taiwan, United States, Qatar
Sujo		Astrid Rondero, Fernanda Valadez	Mexico, United States, France
Super/Man: The Christopher Reeve Story		Ian Bonhôte, Peter Ettedgui	United Kingdom, United States
Treading Water		Gino Evans	United Kingdom
The Village Next to Paradise		Mo Harawe	Austria, France, Somalia

==== Create ====
English Title	Original Title	Director(s)	Production Country
Abiding Nowhere		Tsai Ming-liang	Taiwan, United States
Ernest Cole: Lost and Found		Raoul Peck	United States, France
Grand Theft Hamlet		Sam Crane, Pinny Grylls	United Kingdom
It's Not Me	C'est pas moi	Leos Carax	France
One to One: John & Yoko		Kevin Macdonald	United Kingdom
Pauline Black: A 2-Tone Story		Jane Mingay	United Kingdom
The Stimming Pool		The Neurocultures Collective (Sam Chown Ahern, Georgia Bradburn, Benjamin Brown, Robin Elliott-Knowles, Lucy Walker, Steven Eastwood)	United Kingdom
Superboys of Malegaon		Reema Kagti	India
Twiggy		Sadie Frost	United Kingdom
Two Strangers Trying Not to Kill Each Other		Jacob Perlmutter, Manon Ouimet	United Kingdom, Denmark, United States
The Way We Talk		Adam Wong Sau-Ping	Hong Kong

==== Experimenta ====
English Title	Original Title	Director(s)	Production Country
The Treasury of Human Inheritance		Alexis Kyle Mitchell	Canada, United Kingdom
Notes: Remembered and Found		Maria Anastassiou	United Kingdom, Cyprus
Direct Action		Guillaume Cailleau, Ben Russell	Germany, France
A Fidai Film		Kamal Aljafari	Palestine
A Night We Held Between		Noor Abed	Palestine
+ No Exorcism Film		Komtouch Napattaloong	Thailand
Small Hours of the Night		Daniel Hui	Singapore

==== Family ====
English Title	Original Title	Director(s)	Production Country
Blink		Edmund Stenson, Daniel Roher	United States
The Colors Within	きみの色	Naoko Yamada	Japan
Savages	Sauvages	Claude Barras	Switzerland, France, Belgium
Watership Down		Martin Rosen	United Kingdom

==== Treasures ====
English Title	Original Title	Director(s)	Production Country
Manthan (1976)		Shyam Benegal	India
Manji (1964)		Yasuzō Masumura	Japan
María Candelaria (1943)		Emilio Fernández	Mexico
The Sealed Soil (1977)	Khake sar beh mohr	Marva Nabili	Iran
The Talk of the Town (1942)		George Stevens	United States

=== Shorts ===
The short film programme was divided into the following nine sections.

==== Family Ties ====
English Title	Original Title	Director(s)	Production Country
Trouble		Sarah Blok	United Kingdom
Pigs		Julia Jackman	United Kingdom
Us Four		Alex Peake	United Kingdom
Space(s)		Luke "Frsh" Fannin	United Kingdom
Two Minutes		Jamie Benyon	United Kingdom

==== Honouring Traditions ====
English Title	Original Title	Director(s)	Production Country
Midnight Rising		Aileen Ye	United Kingdom, Netherlands
Iranian Yellow Pages		Anna Snowball	United Kingdom
Irpinia		Jameisha Prescod	United Kingdom
Travelling Home		Juliet Klottrup	United Kingdom
Roots that Reach Toward the Sky		Jess X. Snow	United States, Canada
Red Soil		Joshua Ighodaro	United Kingdom
Salone Love		Tajana Tokyo	United Kingdom

==== I Don't Wanna Force a Smile ====
English Title	Original Title	Director(s)	Production Country
Not Surgery Hours		Tia Salisbury	United Kingdom
The Nobody		Razan Madhoon	United Kingdom
Happy Meat		Matt Green	United Kingdom
Gender Reveal		Mo Matton	Canada
Bob's Funeral		Jack Dunphy	United States
The Real Thing		Charlie Fink	United Kingdom

==== Sleepless Nights ====
English Title	Original Title	Director(s)	Production Country
Sylvia		Tárá Ayeni	United Kingdom
Mosquito Lady		Kristine Gerolaga	United States
The Awakening		Al Campbell	United Kingdom
Outside Noise		Ethan Evans	United Kingdom
Dream Creep		Carlos A. F. López	United States

==== Trials and Tribulations ====
English Title	Original Title	Director(s)	Production Country
Hermit		Daniel Raggett	United Kingdom
Karavidhe		Eoin Doran	United Kingdom
Rhoda		Alex Lawther	United Kingdom
Fierce-ish Grace		Amaya Owen Rowlands	United Kingdom
In Heat		Rory Fleck Byrne	United Kingdom

==== Wondering, Wandering ====
English Title	Original Title	Director(s)	Production Country
And Granny Would Dance		Maryam Mohajer	United Kingdom
A Short Film About Kids		Ibrahim Handal	Palestine
Dawn Every Day		Amir Youssef	Egypt
Liminal Roots		Aliyah Harfoot	United Kingdom
What’s the Film About?		Poorva Bhat	United Kingdom

==== Animated Shorts for Younger Audiences ====
English Title	Original Title	Director(s)	Production Country
Coo-rage		Alina Milkina	Netherlands
Love at First Waf		Louise Le Toullec, Helene Gouil	France
Who’s Wrong?	Vems Fel?	Stina Wirsén, Linda Hambäck	Sweden
The Brave Locomotive		Andrew Chesworth	United States
The Odd Carrot		Inese Pavēne	United Kingdom
Freelance		Luciano A. Muñoz Sessarego, Magnus I. Møller, Peter Smith	Denmark
Yuck!		Loïc Espuche	France
The Child of the Waves	L'Enfant des vagues	Valentine Hilarin, Gaelle Bejjani, Yuhan Wang, Martin Gross, Noam Szwarc, Sofian Pourquery-de-Boisserin	France
Hello Summer	Ahoj leto	Martin Smatana, Veronika Zacharová	Slovakia, Czechia, France

==== A Stream of Echoes ====
English Title	Original Title	Director(s)	Production Country
File No. 2304		A.S.M. Kobayashi	Canada, United States
At the Verge of Wordlessness		Alaa Abu Asad	Netherlands
Before Seriana	Avant Seriana	Samy Benammar	Canada, Algeria
Crocodile Nest	Nido de Cocodrilo	Jazmin Rojas Forero	Colombia, Germany

==== Right in the Substance of Them a Trace of What Happened ====
English Title	Original Title	Director(s)	Production Country
Non/Living		Müge Yildiz	Turkey, Finland
Two Stones	Rua Kōhatu	Noel Meek	New Zealand
Hexham Heads		Chloë Delanghe, Mattijs Driesen	Belgium
The Flesh of Language		Amanda Rice	Ireland
Hemel		Danielle Dean	United Kingdom
Our Lady Who Burns	Nossa Senhora Que Queima	Alice dos Reis	Portugal

=== Surprise Film ===
Saturday Night, dir. Jason Reitman

== Awards ==
The following awards were presented:

=== In competition ===
- Best Film: Memoir of a Snail by Adam Elliot
  - Special Mention: On Becoming a Guinea Fowl by Rungano Nyoni
- Best First Feature (Sutherland Award for Best First Feature): On Falling by Laura Carreira
  - Special Mention: Olivia & the Clouds by Tomás Pichardo Espaillat
- Best Documentary (Grierson Award for Best Documentary): Mother Vera by Cécile Embleton & Alys Tomlinson
  - Special Mention: The Shadow Scholars by Eloise King
- Best Short Film: Vibrations from Gaza by Rehab Nazzal
  - Special Mention: Dragfox by Lisa Ott

=== Audience awards ===
- Best Feature: Four Mothers by Colin Thornton and Darren Thornton
- Best Documentary: Holloway by Sophie Compton and Daisy-May Hudson
- Best Short Film: Two Minutes by Jamie Benyon
