= We Can Be Heroes =

We Can Be Heroes may refer to:

== Film and TV ==
- We Can Be Heroes (2020 film), a film directed by Robert Rodriguez
- We Can Be Heroes (2024 film), a documentary
- We Can Be Heroes: Finding the Australian of the Year, an Australian mockumentary TV series
- "We Can Be Heroes" (Supergirl), an episode of Supergirl
- "We Can Be Heroes" (Orange Is the New Black), an episode of Orange Is the New Black

== Other ==
- "Heroes" (David Bowie song), contains the lyrics "We can be heroes, just for one day."
- "We Can Be Heroes (Just for One Day)", an episode of Reginald the Vampire

== See also ==
- We Could Be Heroes
- "Heroes (We Could Be)"
