= John Vardar vs the Galaxy =

- Macedonian theatrical release poster
- Directed by: Goce Cvetanovski
- Written by: Goce Cvetanovski
- Produced by: Alan Castillo; Eva Konrad; Kalinov Brothers; Lado Skorin
- Starring: Žarko Dimoski; Damjan Cvetanovski; Emilija Micevska
- Edited by: Goce Cvetanovski
- Music by: Miroslav Dimov
- Production companies: Lynx Animation Studios; 3D2D Animatori; Invictus; Umatik Entertainment
- Release dates: October 5, 2024 (Sitges); November 1, 2024 (North Macedonia); March 27, 2025 (Hungary)
- Running time: 86 minutes
- Countries: North Macedonia; Croatia; Hungary; Bulgaria
- Language: Macedonian
- Budget: €1.1 million

John Vardar vs the Galaxy (Macedonian: Јон Вардар против Галаксијата) is a 2024 animated space opera comedy film written and directed by Goce Cvetanovski. It is the first feature animation from North Macedonia. It stars the voices of Žarko Dimoski, Damjan Cvetanovski and Emilija Micevska accompanied by Filip Trajković, Toni Denkovski, Atanas Atanasovski, Sladjana Vujošević, Martin Gjorgoski, Elena Tarčugovska and Bojana Toskovska. It is a co-production between North Macedonia, Croatia, Hungary and Bulgaria.

== Synopsis ==
John Vardar is a failed actor who is abducted by an alien spaceship. John becomes a prisoner of the intergalactic "zoo" of the spaceship's captain, Zark, where he meets two evil creatures, who steal the spaceship and the most dangerous weapon in the universe, the VMK (Reality Modification Device). However, Zark secretly plants the weapon in John's head, causing everything the human says to become real.

== Cast ==
- Žarko Dimoski as Jon Vardar
- Damjan Cvetanovski as Zark
- Emilija Micevska as Lili
- Filip Trajković
- Toni Denkovski
- Atanas Atanasovski
- Sladjana Vujošević
- Martin Gjorgoski
- Elena Tarčugovska
- Bojana Toskovska

== Release ==
John Vardar vs the Galaxy had its world premiere on October 5, 2024, at the 57th Sitges Film Festival, then screened on October 15, 2024, at the 9th KineNova International Film Festival, on October 18, 2024, at the 48th São Paulo International Film Festival, (South American Premiere), on December 6, 2024, at the 14th Balneário Camboriú International Film Festival, on March 15, 2025, at the 29th Sofia International Film Festival, on April 8, 2025, at the 26th Buenos Aires International Festival of Independent Cinema, and on April 18, 2025, at the 47th Moscow International Film Festival.

The film was released commercially on November 1, 2024, in Macedonian theaters, then released in Hungarian theaters on March 27, 2025, and in Bulgarian theaters on October 17, 2025.

In 2025, the film continued its festival run with screenings at the 60th Hungarian Film Week, Fant Bilbao, Cartoons on the Bay, Grossmann Fantastic Film and Wine Festival, Schlingel International Film Festival, Razor Reel Flanders Film Festival, Zuma International Film Festival, and numerous animation, children’s, and genre-focused festivals across Europe, Asia, Africa, North America, and South America.

== Accolades ==
Year	Award / Festival	Category	Recipient	Result	Ref.
2024	9th KineNova International Film Festival	Grand Prix	John Vardar vs the Galaxy	Nominated	
2024	48th São Paulo International Film Festival	New Directors Competition - Best Film	John Vardar vs the Galaxy	Nominated	
2024	48th São Paulo International Film Festival	Best New Director	Goce Cvetanovski	Nominated	
2025	26th BAFICI Buenos Aires International Independent Film Festival	Best Feature	John Vardar vs the Galaxy	Nominated	
2025	29^{th} Cartoons On the Bay	Best Animation Feature	John Vardar vs the Galaxy	Nominated	
2025	9^{th} Portoviejo Film Festival	Best Animation Feature	John Vardar vs the Galaxy	Award {{{text}}}	
2025	9^{th} Maracay International Film & Video Festival	Best Animation Feature	John Vardar vs the Galaxy	Nominated	
2025	11^{th} Montevideo World Film Festival	Best Feature	John Vardar vs the Galaxy	Nominated	
2025	13^{th} Ariano International Film Festival	Best Animation Feature	John Vardar vs the Galaxy	Award	
2025	5^{th} The Galactic Imaginarium Film Festival	Best Animation Feature	John Vardar vs the Galaxy	Award	
2025	12^{th} Silk Road Film Festival	Best Animation Feature	John Vardar vs the Galaxy	Nominated	
2025	13^{th} Giffoni Macedonia Youth Film Festival	Best Animation Feature	John Vardar vs the Galaxy	Nominated	
2025	30^{th} Schlingel Filmfestival	Best Animation Feature	John Vardar vs the Galaxy	Nominated	
2025	14^{th} International Tour Film Festival	Best Animation Feature	John Vardar vs the Galaxy	Nominated	
2025	6^{th} Sydney Science Fiction Film Festival	Best Feature	John Vardar vs the Galaxy	Special Mention	
2025	11^{th} Taichung International Animation Festival	Best Animation Feature	John Vardar vs the Galaxy	Nominated	
2025	18^{th} Leskovac International Film Directors Festival	Best Director	Goce Cvetanovski	Nominated	
2025	6^{th} Beijing International Children’s Film Festival	Best Animation Feature	Goce Cvetanovski	Nominated	
2025	19^{th} International Chinh India Kids Film Festival	Best Animation Feature	John Vardar vs the Galaxy	Silver Chinh Award	
2026	9^{th} Churumbela Children’s Film Festival	Best Feature	John Vardar vs the Galaxy	Nominated	
