= Cheech & Chong's Last Movie =

2024 documentary film

- Film poster
- Directed by: David L. Bushell
- Produced by: David L. Bushell; Robbi Chong
- Starring: Cheech Marin & Tommy Chong
- Cinematography: Michael Alden Lloyd; Peter Flinckenberg; Joe Cicio
- Edited by: Brett Mason
- Music by: Dave Palmer
- Production company: Bushell Productions
- Distributed by: Keep Smokin'
- Release dates: March 12, 2024 (SXSW); April 20, 2025
- Running time: 120 minutes
- Country: United States
- Language: English
- Box office: $750,396

Cheech & Chong's Last Movie is a 2024 American documentary film about Tommy Chong and Cheech Marin, who make up the comedy duo Cheech & Chong. The film is directed and produced by David L. Bushell. It premiered at the 2024 South by Southwest Film & TV Festival. It was given a limited theatrical release on April 20, 2025, and then a nationwide release on April 25.

== Premise ==
While on a road trip to a place called "The Joint", Cheech & Chong recall their lives, from childhood to joining forces in the 1960s up until their breakup in the 1980s.

== Reception ==
On the review aggregator website Rotten Tomatoes, 88% of 32 critics' reviews are positive, with an average rating of 6.9/10. The website's consensus reads: "Getting a lot of mileage out of Cheech Marin and Tommy Chong's enduring rapport, their Last Movie provides both a comprehensive retrospective and a touching last hangout with this legendary comedy duo." Metacritic, which uses a weighted average, assigned the film a score of 73 out of 100, based on nine critics, indicating "generally favorable" reviews.

Frank Scheck of The Hollywood Reporter wrote, "David Bushell's directorial debut receiving its world premiere at SXSW provides a fairly definitive portrait of the legendary comic duo who became a cultural sensation starting in the early 1970s thanks to their sold-out live performances, top-selling comedy albums, and hit movies. There's much fun to be derived from their reunion for this film chronicling their decades-long, on-and-off association, not to mention seeing them driving through the desert and riffing together in their distinctive gonzo way."

Vikram Murthi of IndieWire gave the film a B−, writing, "Any serious comedy fan will probably get something from Last Movie even as it overstays its welcome. It's refreshing that the film never tries to force Cheech and Chong's comedy to transcend its historical period."
