= Davi Pretto =

Brazilian film director and writer

Davi Pretto (Porto Alegre, June 16, 1988) is a Brazilian film director and writer. He has directed four feature films, Castanha (2014), Rifle (2016), Continente (2024) and Future Future (2025), in addition to a number of short films.

== Career ==
Pretto graduated in cinema at PUCRS in 2008. He was a DAAD Berlin Artists-in-Residence fellow in 2018. A retrospective of his work was presented at the Arsenal Film Institut in Berlin.

=== Castanha (2014) ===
Castanha is a dramatised documentary about the actor and drag performer João Carlos Castanha from Porto Alegre. It includes intimate and staged scenes, and scholars have argued that it uses strategies from queer theory in its construction, opening up for a "fluid, variable meaning". A review in the Hollywood Reporter called Castanha "genre-bending", writing that it "provocatively defies fiction/non-fiction categorization".

The movie premiered at the Forum section of the 64th Berlin Film Festival in 2014, where it was one of several films exploring queer identities. It won Best Film at the Rio de Janeiro Film Festival in the New Trends section.

=== Rifle (2016) ===
Pretto's second feature film, the neo-western Rifle, premiered at the 2016 Brasilia Film Festival, where it won awards for Critics Prize, Best Screenplay and Best Sound. Although Rifle is fiction, Pretto employs techniques from documentary and nonfiction cinema, and uses real people and real historical situations. Although the film won multiple awards, some critics found the "too naturalistic approaches" underwhelming.

Rifle was presented at the Forum section of the 67th Berlin Film Festival and later at the FID Marseille. The film won the Grand Prize at the Jeonju Film Festival.

=== Continente (2024) ===
Continente is a rural horror drama written and directed by Pretto where the plot involves an heiress (played by Olívia Torres), a French boyfriend (Corentin Fila) and an inheritance. Supernatural elements are suggested, and used as a platform for political reflection. Critics described the movie as strange and uneven, but also laud its "hallucinatory, rarefied, and ominous universe".

The movie was internationally co-produced (Brazil, France and Argentina) with the support of the Berlinale World Cinema Fund and San Sebastián Film Festival. In 2024, Continent was screened in the main competition of the 57th Sitges Film Festival and won Best Director at the Rio de Janeiro Film Festival in the New Trends section.

=== Future Future (2025) ===
His fourth feature, the lo-fi sci-fi Future Future, was selected for the 59th Karlovy Vary Film Festival in the Proxima competition and later won four awards, including Best Film and Best Screenplay, at the 58th Brasília Film Festival. Some planned locations for the film were devastated by the 2025 Porto Alegre floods, so Pretto used AI-generated imagery that he created himself to finish the film as intended, combining pragmatism with a distopic vision.

=== Short films ===
He has also written and directed ten short films, including Waiting Room(2009), co-directed with Bruno Carboni, Como se Vive, Como se Torce (2014), Half Man, Half Ghost (2015) and Foreign Desert (2020).

== Filmography ==
Feature Films

- Future Future (86min, 2025)
- Continent (115min, 2024)
- Rifle (88min, 2016)
- Castanha (95min, 2014)

Short Films

- Foreign Desert (23min, 2020)
- Half Man, Half Ghost (30min, 2015)
- Como se Vive, Como se Torce (13min, 2014).
- Bagagem (16min, 2014).
- De Passagem (11min, 2012).
- Metro (14min, 2010).
- Waiting Room (12min, 2009). co-dirigido com Bruno Carboni.

== Awards ==
- Best Film at the Brasília Film Festival for Future Future (2025).
- Best Screenplay at the Brasília Film Festival for Future Future (2025).
- Best Director in the New Trends section at the Rio de Janeiro Film Festival for Continente (2024).
- Critics' Prize at the Brasília Film Festival for Rifle (2016).
- Best Screenplay at the Brasília Film Festival for Rifle (2016).
- Grand Prize at the Jeonju Film Festival for Rifle (2016).[1]
- Best Film at Panorama Coisa de Cinema for Rifle (2016).
- Outstanding Award at Cine Esquema Novo for Rifle (2016).
- Outstanding Art Exploration Award at the Beijing International Short Film Festival for Half Man, Half Ghost (2015).
- Best Film at the Novos Rumos section at the Rio de Janeiro Film Festival for Castanha (2014).
- Feisal Special Mention Award at Bafici for Castanha (2014).
- Special Mention Revelation Award at the São Paulo Short Film Festival for Quarto de Espera (2009).[5]
