= Bionico's Bachata =

- Theatrical release poster
- Spanish: La bachata de Biónico
- Directed by: Yoel Morales
- Written by: Cristian Mojica; Yoel Morales
- Produced by: Cristian Mojica; Yoel Morales; Alexander Viola
- Starring: Manuel Raposo
- Cinematography: Alexander Viola
- Edited by: Yoel Morales; Patricia Pepen
- Music by: Pablo Alcántara 'Mediopicky'
- Production company: Mentes Fritas Producciones
- Distributed by: Caribbean Film Distribution
- Release dates: March 8, 2024 (SXSW); April 10, 2025 (Dominican Republic)
- Running time: 80 minutes
- Country: Dominican Republic
- Language: Spanish

Bionico's Bachata (Spanish: La bachata de Biónico) is a 2024 Dominican mockumentary comedy-drama film co-written, co-produced, co-edited and directed by Yoel Morales. It is a free and acid reinterpretation Romeo and Juliet by William Shakespeare, starring Manuel Raposo as a romantic drug addict who must take control of his life before his fiancée leaves rehab.

== Synopsis ==
The romantic Bionico struggles to find a job and a home to support his fiancée, La Flaca, after rehab. He tries to quit drugs with the help of his partner, Calvita.

== Cast ==
The actors participating in this film are:

- Manuel Raposo as Bionico
- Ana Minier as La Flaca
- El Napo as Calvita
- Yasser Michelén as Andrés MMG
- Inés Fermín as Olfa
- Donis Taveras as El Ingeniero
- Barbara Plaza as La Diva
- María Tavárez as Yudelka
- La Sierva Wendy
- Héctor Sierra as El Águila

== Production ==
The film was shot in the neighborhoods of Villa Francisca, Ensanche Capotillo, Sánchez Luperón and San Cristóbal.

== Release ==
Bionico's Bachata had its world premiere on March 8, 2024, at the 2024 South by Southwest Film & TV Festival, then screened on June 1, 2024, at the Los Angeles Latino International Film Festival, on August 11, 2024, at the 77th Locarno Film Festival, on October 13, 2024, at the 68th BFI London Film Festival, on November 20, 2024, at the 45th Havana Film Festival, on March 23, 2025, at the LATcinema Fest, and on June 27, 2025, at the 13th Costa Rica International Film Festival.

The film was released commercially on April 10, 2025, in Dominican theaters.

== Accolades ==
Award / Festival	Date of ceremony	Category	Recipient(s)	Result	Ref.
South by Southwest	16 March 2024	Global Audience Award	Bionico's Bachata	Won	
Havana Film Festival	13 December 2024	Colón de Oro	Bionico's Bachata	Nominated	
Havana Film Festival	13 December 2024	Best Actor	Manuel Raposo	Won	
Costa Rica International Film Festival	29 June 2025	Audience Award	Bionico's Bachata	Won	
