= Rehab Nazzal =

Palestinian-born artist

- رحاب نزال
- Born: Palestine
- Education: BFA at University of Ottawa; MFA at Toronto Metropolitan University, PhD in art and visual culture University of Western Ontario
- Known for: Video artist, photographer, Sound artist

Rehab Nazzal is a Palestinian-born multidisciplinary artist based in Toronto, Ontario, Canada.

== Biography ==
Nazzal holds a PhD in art and visual culture from the University of Western Ontario, Canada, an MFA from Toronto Metropolitan University, Toronto, a BFA from the University of Ottawa, and a BA in Economics from Damascus University, Syria.

== Work ==
Nazzal uses sound, video and the photographic image in her work to examine the effects of settler-colonial violence on the bodies and minds of colonized people, on all forms of life, and on the land. Often, her work creates immersive environments that represent the struggle of the Palestinian people with previous bodies of work centered on the West Bank and Gaza, the Negev Prison and the village of Bil’in.

Nazzal's 2014 exhibition Invisible at the Karsh-Masson Art Gallery on the ground floor of city hall in Ottawa was publicly condemned by Israel's ambassador to Canada, Rafael Barak. The exhibition included images of Palestinian prisoners in Israeli prisons, among other art pieces that portray the West Bank and Gaza.

Invisible featured four videos and 1,700 photographs. One video, Bil'in, was about Nazzal's experience in the village of Bil'in where Palestinians and members of international solidarity movements were physically attacked by the Israel Defense Forces during a weekly protest against land confiscation. Nazzal kept the sound intact and reconstructed the image to "represent the feeling of being suffocated and blinded by tear gas." Another video, Target, consisted of over 127 flashing images of Palestinians who were extrajudicially assassinated across the world or in occupied Palestine. Nazzal edited the images to flash quickly as a formal choice to represent the fact that these individuals's lives were cut short.

In 2010, ''Divide'', a solo exhibition of Nazzal's photographs was on display at Gallery 101 in Ottawa.

In 2014 Nazzal's work was exhibited at the Art Gallery of Mississauga. The exhibition, titled Visible, was an immersive installation using found images alongside sound and video works that confronted viewers with the destruction wrought by the violence in Gaza.

In 2012, Nazzal's work was exhibited in A Refusal of Images, a group show at A Space Gallery, in Toronto curated by Vicky Moufawad-Paul.

In 2023, Nazzal's work was also included in the group exhibition The Willful Plot at the Morris and Helen Belkin Art Gallery alongside works by Derya Akay, Vivienne Bessette, Gabi Dao, Derek Jarman, Charmian Johnson, Glenn Lewis, Mike MacDonald, and Dana Qaddah. Nazzal's works in the exhibition included the documentary Canada Park (2015) and the photography series We, the Wild Plants and Fruit Trees (2022).

Nazzal has exhibited her work internationally, including at the International Yellowknife Film Festival, Montreal Palestine Film festival, SAW video for the Media Arts, International Mini Print Festival, Gallery 101, and Ottawa X-photography Festival.

Nazzal has received numerous awards and grants including Edmund and Isobel Ryan Visual Arts award in photography, University of Ottawa; Documentary Photography for Social Justice Award, Ryerson University; the Social Sciences and Humanities Research Council (SSHRC) Doctoral Award; Ontario Graduate Scholarship; Ryerson University Scholarship. In 2024 her film Vibrations from Gaza won the award for Best Short Film at the 2024 BFI London Film Festival, and won the Prix Irisfor Best Short Documentary at the 26th Quebec Cinema Awards.

== Shooting ==
In December 2015, Nazzal was shot in the leg by an Israeli sniper while in occupied Palestine, photographing military raid by the Israeli army.

== Books ==
Nazzal published her book, titled "Driving in Palestine التحرّك في فلسطين", in April 2023 (publication by Fernwood Publishing Co Ltd), which traverses the politics of mobility and surveillance in modern Palestine from a first-person perspective. The book is composed of 160 photographs, hand-drawn maps, and critical essays by Palestinian and Canadian scholars and artists.
