= Vibrations from Gaza =

2024 Palestinian-Canadian documentary film

- Arabic: ذبذبات من غزة
- Directed by: Rehab Nazzal
- Written by: Rehab Nazzal
- Cinematography: Rehab Nazzal; Mohammed Abu Alkas; Mohammad Nateel; Nawras Sameer
- Edited by: Rehab Nazzal; Rana Nazzal Hamadeh; Serene Alahmad
- Distributed by: MAD Distribution
- Release date: 2023
- Running time: 16 minutes
- Countries: Palestine; Canada
- Languages: Arabic; Arabic Sign Language

Vibrations from Gaza (Arabic: ذبذبات من غزة) is a Palestinian-Canadian short documentary film, directed by Rehab Nazzal and released in August 2023. The film examines the impact of the Israeli siege and frequent military attacks on deaf children in Gaza Strip, who are experiencing the violence through vibrations in the air and trembling in the ground rather than waves of sound.

== Awards ==
Award	Date of ceremony	Category	Recipient(s)	Result	Ref.
BFI London Film Festival	2024	Short Film Competition	Rehab Nazzal	Won	
Prix Iris	December 8, 2024	Best Short Documentary	Rehab Nazzal	Won	
Cinémed Montpellier International Film Festival	October 2024	La Gazette Audience Award	Rehab Nazzal	Won	
Cinémed Montpellier International Film Festival	October 2024	Ville de Montpellier Young Audience Award	Rehab Nazzal	Won	
