= Rich Flu =

2024 film by Galder Gaztelu-Urrutia

- Theatrical release poster
- Directed by: Galder Gaztelu-Urrutia
- Written by: Galder Gaztelu-Urrutia; Pedro Rivero; David Desola; Sam Steiner
- Produced by: Pablo Larraín; Juan de Dios Larraín; Adrián Guerra; Núria Valls; Carlos Juárez; Galder Gaztelu-Urrutia; Albert Soler
- Starring: Mary Elizabeth Winstead; Rafe Spall; Lorraine Bracco; Jonah Hauer-King; Timothy Spall
- Cinematography: Jon D. Domínguez
- Edited by: Haritz Zubillaga
- Music by: Aránzazu Calleja
- Production companies: Fábula; Nostromo Pictures; Basque Films; Mamma Team
- Distributed by: Filmax
- Release dates: October 6, 2024 (Sitges); January 24, 2025 (Spain)
- Country: Spain
- Language: English

Rich Flu (Spanish: La fiebre de los ricos) is a 2024 English-language Spanish film written, directed, and produced by Galder Gaztelu-Urrutia. It stars Mary Elizabeth Winstead, Rafe Spall, Lorraine Bracco, Jonah Hauer-King, and Timothy Spall. It premiered at the 57th Sitges Film Festival on October 6, 2024. The plot of the film coincides with that of the novel "Antidystopia" published in 2020.

== Plot ==
A disease targets the richest people on Earth, starting with billionaires, then millionaires, and so on, causing people to give away their assets to avoid death.

== Cast ==
- Mary Elizabeth Winstead as Laura
- Rafe Spall as Toni
- Lorraine Bracco as Martha
- Dixie Egerickx as Anna
- Timothy Spall as Sebastian Snail Sr.
- Jonah Hauer-King as Sebastian Snail Jr.
- César Domboy as Christian
- Dayana Esebe as Yoleen
- Richard Sammel as Von Willebrand
- Phillip Schurer as Producer 1
- Adrian Randle as Oliver O'Brien (Expert 1)

== Production ==
In February 2022, the film was announced at the European Film Market, with Rosamund Pike on board to star. In April, Sierra/Affinity closed deals with several international distributors, and in May, Daniel Brühl and Macaulay Culkin joined the cast. Production began by November 2022, with actors spotted on set. In February 2023, the official cast was announced at EFM, revealing Pike, Brühl, and Culkin had dropped out due to scheduling conflicts. Filming took place in Barcelona, Fuerteventura, and Senegal. In April 2024, cast member Jonah Hauer-King said he had recently completed ADR sessions for the film.

== Release ==
The film screened for distributors, but not the general public, at the Scotiabank Theatre Toronto as part of the Toronto International Film Festival's Industry Selects program on September 6, 2024. It had its world premiere at the 57th Sitges Film Festival on October 6, 2024. The film was theatrically released by Filmax in Spain on January 24, 2025.

== Reception ==
Javier Ocaña of El País assessed that Gaztelu-Urrutia and the co-screenwriters manage to pull off a first hour "attractive in terms of plot, well dialogued and with a remarkable dramatic rhythm", yet the film becomes diluted in the second half.

== See also ==
- List of Spanish films of 2025
