= Dead Mail (film) =

2024 film directed by Joe DeBoer and Kyle McConaghy

- Film poster
- Directed by: Joe DeBoer; Kyle McConaghy
- Written by: Joe DeBoer; Kyle McConaghy
- Produced by: Zachary Weil; Brett Arndt
- Starring: Sterling Macer Jr.; John Fleck; Micki Jackson
- Cinematography: Kyle McConaghy
- Edited by: Kyle McConaghy
- Music by: Joe DeBoer; Kyle McConaghy
- Production companies: Spooky Pictures; Alarmist Entertainment; Contact Light Films
- Distributed by: Shudder
- Release dates: March 9, 2024 (SXSW); April 18, 2025
- Running time: 106 minutes
- Country: United States
- Language: English

Dead Mail is a 2024 American horror-thriller film written and directed by Joe DeBoer and Kyle McConaghy. In it, a post office receives a piece of mail that points to a kidnapping.

== Plot ==
In the 1980s, aspiring Black synthesizer designer Josh Iver is approached by Trent Whittington at an electronics showcase. Trent takes an interest in Josh's self-designed analog synthesizer and offers to collaborate with him, providing him with space in his house and resources to further his design. Josh accepts the offer and begins an amicable partnership with Trent. However, Trent shows signs of becoming dangerously obsessed with Josh, listening to his synthesizer tests in his spare time and presenting him with gifts to keep him from leaving.

Eventually, Josh sends a test tape to a synthesizer design company in Japan and is offered a job working for them, distressing Trent, who resorts to moving all the synthesizer equipment to a second house he owns and locking Josh in its soundproofed basement when he tries to leave. He forces Josh to work on the synthesizer project in the basement while communicating with him through a PA phone, showing signs of a recurring obsession with (and potential attraction to) talented Black men. When Josh uses his butane torch to burn through a locked door and attempt to escape, Trent catches him and locks him in a bathroom, chained to a sink as his "punishment". Over time, Josh learns Trent's routine, writes a note in distress, and manages to escape while Trent is away, but Trent catches and subdues him just after he drops the note in a public mailbox.

The note finds its way to the Peoria, Illinois post office, where employees Ann and Bess deliver it to dead letter investigator Jasper. After using his connection with French intelligence officer Renée Ogaard and investigative skills to locate the owner of a missing necklace, Jasper spends the night at a low-cost men's housing facility and ends up bunking with Trent, who has followed him in an obsessive attempt to retrieve the note; Trent steals his office key. The next day, while Jasper is on the phone with Renée and making progress identifying potential kidnappers on the street listed on the note, Trent enters the office and kills him and janitor Brooks, arranging the crime scene to appear as if Brooks has committed a murder-suicide.

Ann and Bess resolve to complete Jasper's work and find the source of the note. Ann visits the men's housing facility and cross-references names photos taken of its residents with Renée, narrowing the people down to just a handful of addresses. After a few failed visits, Ann arrives at Trent's second house just as Trent is preparing poisoned food to get rid of Josh. She is invited in, but Trent locks her in and prepares to kill her. However, she locates and frees Josh, unaware that Trent is observing them. Dejected, Trent announces over the PA that he is terminating his partnership with Josh, allows him and Ann to leave, then goes back to his garage and eats the poisoned food while listening to a tape of Josh testing the synthesizer.

The end credits reveal the fates and legacies of the characters, such as Josh disappearing from public life after being treated at the hospital and Ann being fired from postal service work, finding work managing a refrigerator section at a discount store.

== Cast ==
- Sterling Macer Jr. as Joshua "Josh" Iver
- John Fleck as Trent Whittington
- Micki Jackson as Ann Lankford
- Susan Priver as Bethesda "Bess" Greer
- Tomas Boykin as Jasper Lawrence
- Nick Heyman as Renée Ogaard
- Sean Heyman as Brooks

== Release ==
Dead Mail was released in the United States on March 9, 2024 at the 2024 South by Southwest Film & TV Festival.

== Reception ==
On the review aggregator website Rotten Tomatoes, 93% of 29 critics' reviews are positive, with an average rating of 7.7/10. The website's consensus reads: "Punching above its limited budget's weight with an intriguing hook and inventive style, Dead Mail is a polished thriller that audiences won't be returning to sender." Metacritic, which uses a weighted average, assigned the film a score of 78 out of 100, based on 6 critics, indicating "generally favorable" reviews. Dennis Harvey of Variety praised the film's ambiance, production design, and cinematography, calling it "an effective, twisty thriller with a singular edge of off-kilter black comedy."

== See also ==
- Race in horror films
- Black horror
