= Dianna Dilworth =

American filmmaker

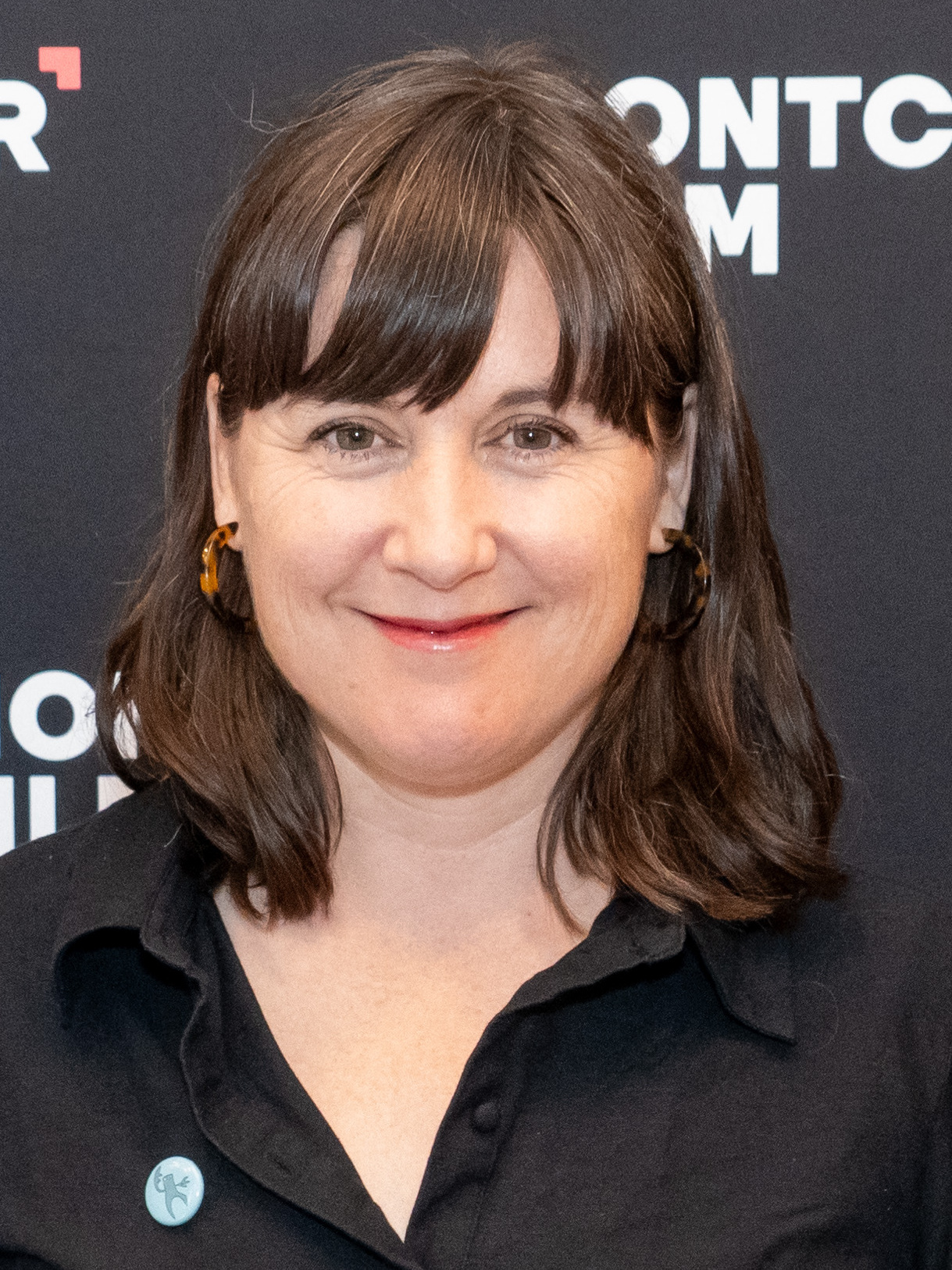
- Dilworth in 2024
- Born: 1978; San Diego, California

Dianna Dilworth (born 1978 in San Diego, California) is a filmmaker and journalist. She attended San Francisco State University and the European Graduate School.

She is the director of We Are the Children, a documentary about Michael Jackson's fans during his 2004-2005 trial, which is distributed by independent film distribution company Indiepix. She is also the director of a feature-length documentary on the Mellotron called Mellodrama.

She also directed "The Gallery Is a Guillotine", a music video for the Most Holy Trinity on Brown Bottle Records; "Lonely Wine", a music video for artist TK Webb and label The Social Registry; and "What You Wish For", a music video for Telescope Music.

She directs documentaries about culture in New York City for Current TV.

As a freelance magazine writer, her articles have appeared in The Believer, Dwell, Russian Esquire, Architectural Record, and Plenty.
