= The Spider Labyrinth =

- Directed by: Gianfranco Giagni
- Screenplay by: Riccardo Aragno; Tonino Cervi; Cesare Frugoni; Gianfranco Manfredi
- Story by: Tonino Cervi
- Produced by: Tonino Cervi
- Starring: Roland Wybenga; Paola Rinaldi; Margareta von Krauss; Claudia Muzii
- Cinematography: Nino Celeste
- Edited by: Sergio Montanari
- Music by: Franco Piersanti
- Production company: Splendida Film
- Distributed by: Medusa/Penta Film
- Release date: 25 August 1988 (Italy)
- Running time: 86 minutes
- Country: Italy

The Spider Labyrinth (Italian: Il nido del ragno) is a 1988 Italian horror film directed by Gianfranco Giagni.

== Production ==
Prior to working on The Spider Labyrinth, director Gianfrano Giagni had worked in radio and television since the mid-1970s. Along with directing music videos he created the music program Mister Fantasy and made the short film Giallo e nero. Producer Tonino Cervi liked Giagni's short and offered him a job to direct his first feature, the horror film The Spider Labyrinth.

The original script for the film was developed by Cervi, Riccardo Aragno and Cesare Frugoni which dated a few years before production started. Giagni felt the script was a bit dated, and got Gianfranco Manfredi in with him to give the film a more modern framing. Their changes in the script changed the location from Venice to Budapest, with a framing storyline filmed in Dallas, Texas.

== Release ==
The Spider Labyrinth was distributed in Italy by Medusa/Penta Film on August 25, 1988.

== Reception ==
From retrospective reviews, In his book on horror films of the 1980s, Scott Aaron Stine stated that despite that gorey scenes do not start until 40 minutes into the film, it was an "engaging and beautifully staged horror film." comparing scenes to the work of Dario Argento and Mario Bava. Louis Paul commented on the film on his book on Italian horror film directors, declaring the film "one of the most obscure and atmospheric modern Italian horror films."
