= Galder Gaztelu-Urrutia =

Basque film director (born 1974)

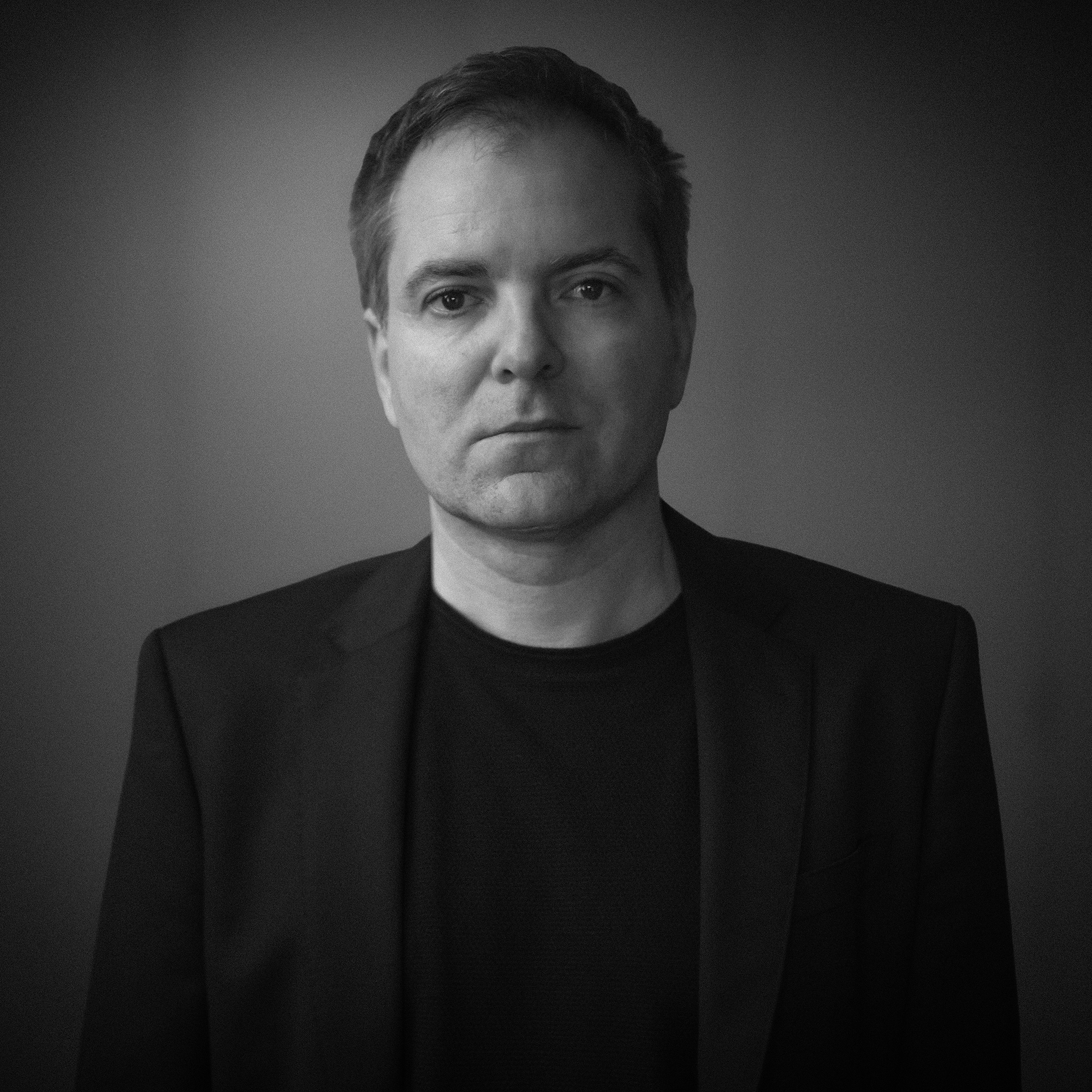
- Gaztelu-Urrutia in 2024
- Born: 18 March 1974 (age 52); Abadiño, Spain
- Occupation: Filmmaker
- Years active: 2004–present

Galder Gaztelu-Urrutia (Basque: [ɡalder ɣas̻telu urutia]; born 18 March 1974) is a Spanish film director. He made his feature-film debut with The Platform (2019), a dystopian science fiction-horror film.

== Early life and education ==
Gaztelu-Urrutia was born on 17 February 1974, in Bilbao. He completed his Bachelor of Arts in business management with a specialization in international trade.

== Career ==
In addition to directing the short films 913 (2004) and The House on the Lake (2011), Gaztelu-Urrutia directed commercials. He made his feature film debut in 2019 with the dystopian science fiction–horror film The Platform. He noted that the point of the film is that "it isn't about a war between those above and those below — we all have someone above us and someone below us".

In February 2023, Deadline announced that his next film will be a thriller titled Rich Flu, starring Mary Elizabeth Winstead and Jonah Hauer-King.

Gaztelu-Urrutia's third original film will be Banquet, which began production in November 2025. It stars Meghann Fahy, Alfie Williams, Corey Mylchreest, and Finbar Lynch, and will be produced by David Yates.

== Influences and style ==
Gaztelu-Urrutia has named Dante's Divine Comedy as one of his literary influences for The Platform, as well as films such as Buñuel's The Exterminating Angel (1962), Jeunet's Delicatessen (1991), Ridley Scott's Blade Runner (1982) and Scorsese's Taxi Driver (1976).

== Filmography ==
Short film

Year	Title	Director	Writer
2004	913	Yes	Yes
2011	The House on the Lake	Yes	No

Feature film

Key
†	Denotes films that have not yet been released

Year	Title	Director	Producer	Writer
2019	The Platform	Yes	No	No
2024	The Platform 2	Yes	Yes	Yes
2024	Rich Flu	Yes	Yes	Yes
TBA	Banquet †	Yes	No	No

== Awards ==
The Platform won the People's Choice Award for Midnight Madness at the Toronto Film Festival, and garnered four honours at the Sitges Film Festival: Best Film, Best New Director, Best Special Effects and the Audience Award.
