= Grand Theft Hamlet =

2024 documentary film

- UK theatrical release poster
- Directed by: Sam Crane; Pinny Grylls
- Written by: Sam Crane; Pinny Grylls
- Produced by: Julia Ton; Rebecca Wolff
- Starring: Sam Crane; Mark Oosterveen
- Cinematography: Pinny Grylls
- Edited by: Pinny Grylls
- Music by: Jamie Perera
- Production companies: Project 1961; Grasp the Nettle Films; Park Pictures
- Distributed by: Tull Stories
- Release dates: March 2024 (SXSW); 6 December 2024 (United Kingdom)
- Running time: 91 minutes
- Country: United Kingdom
- Language: English
- Box office: $214,530

Grand Theft Hamlet is a 2024 British machinima documentary film directed by Sam Crane and Pinny Grylls. The film is about the staging of a production of Hamlet in the video game Grand Theft Auto Online during one of the UK's COVID-19 pandemic lockdowns in 2021.

== Premise ==
The documentary follows Sam Crane and Mark Oosterveen as they attempt to cast and produce a live virtual production of William Shakespeare's play Hamlet in the video game Grand Theft Auto Online while staying home due to lockdowns during the COVID-19 pandemic in the United Kingdom. The film is shot entirely within the video game as a Machinima production and the subjects are all depicted by their in-game avatars.

== Release ==
The film premiered at the 2024 SXSW Film Festival, where it won the Grand Jury Award for best documentary feature. The film was released theatrically in the United Kingdom on 6 December 2024 by Tull Stories, with Mubi releasing the film theatrically in the United States on 17 January 2025 and globally on its streaming service on 21 February 2025.

== Reception ==
=== Critical response ===
On the review aggregator website Rotten Tomatoes, 94% of 80 critics' reviews are positive, with an average rating of 7.9/10. The website's consensus reads: "A startling example of using any tools at your disposal to make memorable art, Grand Theft Hamlet's experimental approach does justice by the Bard." Metacritic, which uses a weighted average, assigned the film a score of 82 out of 100, based on 25 critics, indicating "universal acclaim".

Glenn Kenny of RogerEbert.com gave the film four out of four stars and wrote, "More than just a shaggy dog story, Grand Theft Hamlet is a pointed, entertaining and moving examination of interdisciplinary conductivity at its most surprising." Critic Simon Abrams, Kenny's colleague in RogerEbert.com, named Grand Theft Hamlet as the best film of 2025.

=== Accolades ===
Award / film festival	Date of ceremony	Category	Recipient(s)	Result	Ref.
British Independent Film Awards	8 December 2024	Best Debut Director – Feature Documentary	Sam Crane and Pinny Grylls	Won	
British Independent Film Awards	8 December 2024	Raindance Maverick Award	Grand Theft Hamlet	Won	
Critics' Choice Documentary Awards	November 9, 2025	Best First Documentary Feature	Sam Crane and Pinny Grylls	Nominated	
London Film Critics Circle	2 February 2025	Documentary of the Year	Grand Theft Hamlet	Nominated	
Sitges Film Festival	12 October 2024	Best Sitges Documenta Film	Grand Theft Hamlet	Won	
SXSW Film Festival	13 March 2024	Jury Award for best documentary feature	Grand Theft Hamlet	Won	
Vancouver International Film Festival	17 October 2024	Audience Award, Spectrum	Grand Theft Hamlet	Won	
