= An Army of Women =

2024 documentary film

- Film poster
- Directed by: Julie Lunde Lillesæter
- Produced by: Natalya Sarch, Arne Dahr, Julie Lunde Lillesæter
- Cinematography: Julie Lunde Lillesæter
- Edited by: Trude Lirhus, Mathias Askeland
- Music by: Therese Aune
- Production companies: Differ Media, 3B-Produktion, Lost Footage Films
- Release date: 8 March 2024 (SXSW Festival)
- Running time: 84 minutes
- Countries: Norway, Germany, United States
- Language: English

An Army of Women is a 2024 Norwegian documentary film, directed by Julie Lunde Lillesæter. It follows a 2018 class action lawsuit filed by a group of women against police and prosecutors in Austin, Texas, for mishandling sexual assault cases.

The film had its world premiere at the Austin SXSW Film Festival on March 8, 2024.

== Story ==
The film follows lawyers and plaintiffs in a class-action lawsuit over the course of four years. Amongst them are plaintiff Marina Garrett, who was raped by a stranger in a parking garage, and plaintiff Hanna Senko, who was date raped by an acquaintance. Both women's cases were dismissed by law enforcement. The film chronicles the group's journey as they sue the Austin Police Department and Travis County District Attorney's Office, ultimately ending in a historic settlement that forced police and prosecutors to change how they handle the crime of sexual assault.

== Release ==
The SXSW film premiere was in the 2024 Documentary Feature Competition. On June 14, 2024, it had its international premiere at Sheffield DocFest.

== Reception ==
On the review aggregator website Rotten Tomatoes, 100% of 6 critics' reviews are positive.
