= The Stimming Pool =

2024 film

- Directed by: Sam Chown-Ahern; Georgia Bradburn; Benjamin Brown; Robin Elliott-Knowles; Lucy Walker; Steven Eastwood
- Produced by: Steven Eastwood; Chloe White
- Cinematography: Gregory Oke
- Edited by: Sergio Vego Borrego
- Music by: Brain Audio; Tom Haines
- Production company: Whalebone Films
- Release date: 2024 (CPH:DOX)
- Running time: 67 mins
- Country: United Kingdom
- Language: English

The Stimming Pool is a 2024 British documentary film about autistic co-creation, co-directed by Neurocultures Collective (Sam Chown-Ahern, Georgia Bradburn, Benjamin Brown, Robin Elliott-Knowles, Lucy Walker) and Steven Eastwood.

== Synopsis ==
A hybrid of documentary and fiction, the film shows a spectrum of some autistic experience, using a combination of ideas and characters thought up by the collective of co-directors.

== Production ==
The film uses a collaborative approach to filmmaking.

== Release ==
The Stimming Pool had its world premiere at CPH:DOX in Copenhagen in 2024.

== Awards ==
- 2024: Co-winner (with The Silence of Reason by Kumjana Novakova), Main Competition Award, Iceland Documentary Film Festival
