= Vaughan Grylls =

British artist, photographer, and author (born 1943)

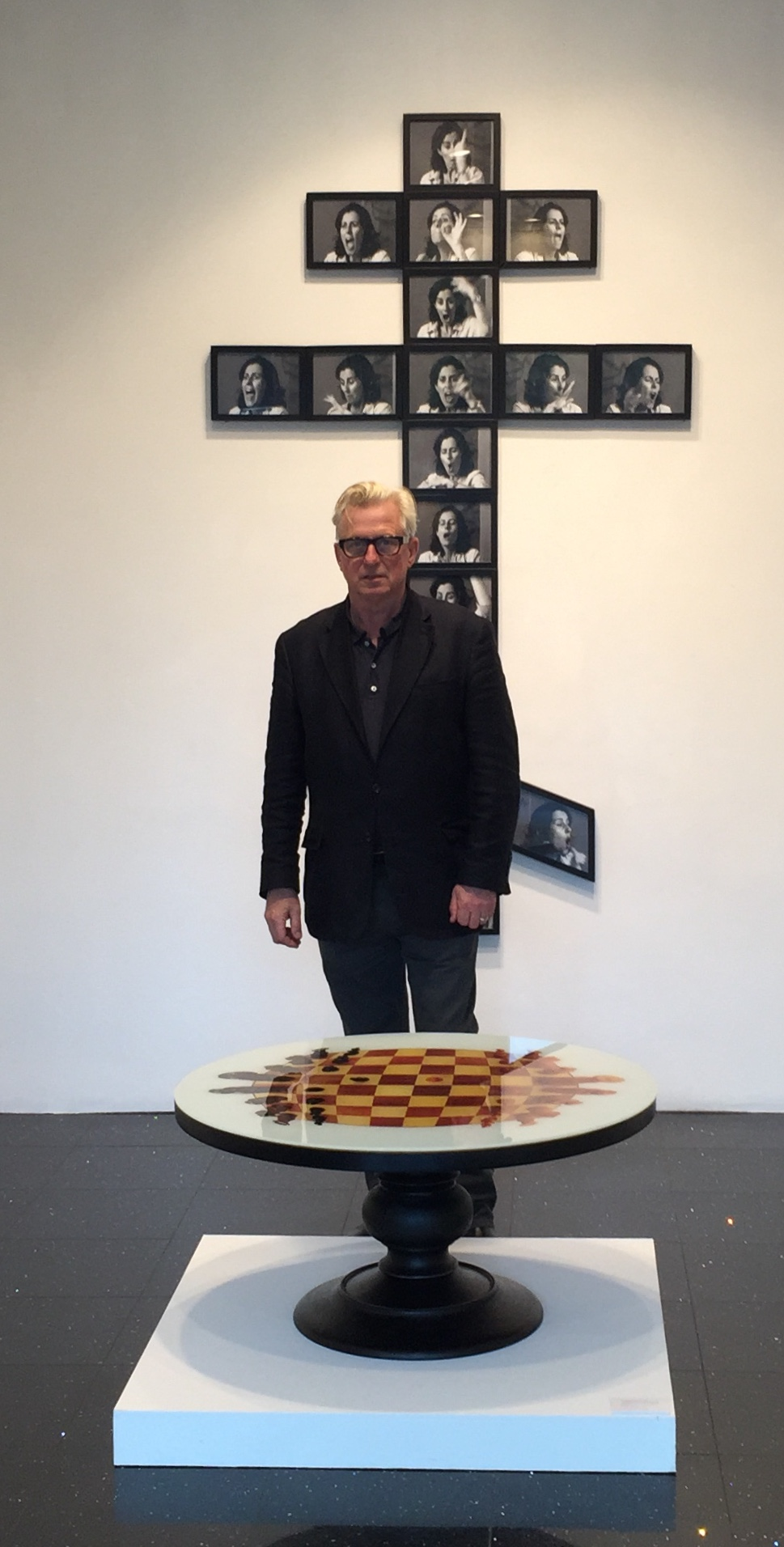
- Vaughan Grylls
- Born: 10 December 1943 (age 82); Newark, Nottinghamshire, England
- Education: Slade School of Fine Art; Goldsmiths, University of London
- Occupations: Artist, author
- Known for: Sculpture, photography
- Style: Collage/joiner photography
- Website: vaughangrylls.com

Vaughan Grylls is a British artist, photographer, author, and academic administrator. He is known for conceptual and photographic works produced from the late 1960s onwards, especially panoramic photo-collages on historic and contemporary political and social subjects.

Grylls was the director of Kent Institute of Art & Design before co-founding the University College for the Creative Arts at Canterbury, Epsom, Farnham, Maidstone & Rochester. He has work in various public collections, including the National Library of Wales and University College London.

Initially trained as a sculptor, Grylls began creating photo collages in 1977. Some of his notable panoramic works include the Wailing Wall, Jerusalem (1979), Site of the Assassination of JFK (1980), and Britain Through the Looking Glass (1984).

Additionally, Grylls has authored seven books in the Then and Now series: Oxford Then and Now (2009), Cambridge Then and Now (2011), Singapore Then and Now (2016), Hong Kong Then and Now (2016), Shanghai Then and Now (2017), The Old West Then and Now (2019), London Then and Now (2020), and was photographer for Hollywood Then and Now (2013).

== Early life and education ==
Vaughan Grylls was born 10 December 1943 in Newark-on-Trent. From 1963 onwards, Grylls attended art schools at Nottingham, Wolverhampton, Goldsmiths, University of London, and the Slade School of Fine Art.

== Career ==
In the late 1960s, while attending the Slade School of Fine Art, Grylls gave guided tours of Cambridge to overseas visitors, and after graduating, his first teaching position was at the University of Reading, followed by Homerton College, Cambridge where he taught sculpture.

=== Pun-sculptures ===
At Goldsmiths, University of London in 1968, Grylls produced an exhibition of his first photographically based pun-sculptures, each made from cardboard and called collectively 'Ludwig Wittgenstein's Palace of Pun.' He took this with him to the Slade School of Fine Art and continued to make more pun-sculptures. His work was noticed at his final show at the Slade in 1970 by Jasia Reichardt, art critic and assistant director of the ICA. His first London exhibition was held at the ICA in October 1970 as one room in an exhibition entitled 'Ten Sitting Rooms.'

Grylls' pun-sculpture work was also shown at an alternative exhibition space called The Gallery. The Gallery was opened in Lisson St, London in 1972 by fellow Slade graduate Nicholas Wegner. Wegner invited Grylls to show at The Gallery. The work Grylls exhibited in 1973 entitled 'An Indo-Chinese Punsculpture' was a large photo-mural commenting on the signing of the so-called Paris Peace Treaty. Wegner and Grylls then collaborated in an artistic partnership, inspired in part by Andy Warhol, from 1973 to 1975. Wegner closed The Gallery in 1978.

=== Photography ===
From 1977, Grylls' style developed into works largely inspired by international news and political events. He used photographic montage techniques to create a collection of images pinned together to produce one large image. In 1977, he travelled to Istanbul and used a telephoto lens to produce his first panoramic photo-collage, Hagia Sophia, Istanbul. It was exhibited in 1978 at the Whitechapel Art Gallery in London.

His next photo-collage exhibition was in 1979 called The Wailing (Western) Wall, Jerusalem and in Flanders Fields. Grylls said that his overtly political art tried, in the case of The Wailing (Western) Wall, Jerusalem, to "examine a cultural and religious icon that has had a far-reaching influence on political events today."

In 1980, Grylls created panoramic collages of the sites where President John F. Kennedy on Elm Street and Lord Mountbatten in Donegal Bay were murdered. William Feaver of The Observer referred to Grylls' work as "mixed-media surveys, combining epic scale and humdrum particulars."

In 1984, Grylls' 'Britain Through the Looking Glass', a twenty-eight by eight-foot work of colour Xerox photographs that were taken at the British Museum in London in the "Egyptian Mummy room" was exhibited at the Atlantis Gallery in London. Also, in the same exhibition, were two equally large panoramas, one based on the Greenwich Meridian, the other on Wembley Stadium.

=== Education ===
In 1984, Grylls was appointed professor of photography and video at Williams College, Massachusetts. In 1989, Grylls returned to England to become Head of Art & Design at Wolverhampton Polytechnic (later known as the University of Wolverhampton). In 1996, he became director of the Kent Institute of Art & Design.

In 2003, Grylls proposed creating a new university of more than 6,000 students studying art, design, and architecture by merging the Kent Institute with the Surrey Institute of Art & Design to prevent these free-standing art colleges becoming absorbed into their local universities. The merged institution was called the University College for the Creative Arts at Canterbury, Epsom, Farnham, Maidstone & Rochester (since 2009 the University for the Creative Arts). Grylls as founding Chief Executive of the merged institution resigned soon afterwards, announcing that he intended to return full-time to his own work.

=== 2020s ===
Just America, exhibited at the Batsford Gallery, London from April 3–28, 2024, brought together works on the subject of the United States made by Grylls between 1973 and 2024. It included Fentanyl Drive (2024), a 20-foot panoramic photo collage on drug addiction in Philadelphia.

Strongmen, exhibited at the Batsford Gallery, London from June 13–22, 2025, brought together works on the subject of authoritarian rule made by Grylls from 1973 to 2025. It included Second Coming (2025), a 26-foot panoramic photo collage depicting the penultimate Donald Trump rally at Warren, Michigan before the 2024 United States presidential election.

Throughout the COVID-19 lockdowns, Grylls produced a daily video series of short online performances via social media. The videos included piano playing, humour, and Grylls' personal anecdotes. The broadcasts became known as Vaughan's Socks, a reference to the brightly coloured socks that he wore during the performances.

== Publications ==
From 2023 onwards, Grylls, a long-time classic car enthusiast, published a series of illustrated motoring books for Batsford Books. The books cover the history and design of various European car manufacturers.

- The Spirit of Saab – 50 Reasons Why We Love Them (2023). ISBN 9781849948029.
- The Spirit of BMW – 50 Reasons Why We Love Them (2023). ISBN 9781849948036.
- The Spirit of VW – 50 Reasons Why We Love Them (2024). ISBN 9781849948753.
- The Spirit of Volvo – 50 Reasons Why We Love Them (2025). ISBN 9781849949880.
- The Spirit of Mercedes – 50 Reasons Why We Love Them (2026). ISBN 9781837330249.

In 2018, Bitter Lemon Press published Grylls' autobiographical book, Have You Come Far? A Life in Interviews.
