= Pinny Grylls =

British documentary filmmaker

- Born: Hackney, East London, England
- Education: University of Oxford
- Occupation: Documentary filmmaker
- Years active: 2002–
- Notable work: Grand Theft Hamlet (2024)
- Spouse: Sam Crane
- Relatives: Vaughan Grylls (father)

Pinny Grylls is a British documentary filmmaker. She is known for co-directing Grand Theft Hamlet, a 2024 feature documentary shot exclusively inside a video game, with Sam Crane. The film won the Best Documentary Jury Prize at the 2024 SXSW Film Festival.

== Career ==
In 2002, Grylls and Rachel Millward co-founded the Birds Eye View Film Festival. BEV showcased films by emerging women filmmakers from around the world and became the UK's first major film festival for female filmmakers.

Grylls directed the 2007 multi award-winning short documentary Peter and Ben. It screened at London International Film Festival and IDFA where it was nominated for the prestigious Silver Cub Award. It won the Best Documentary Award at Aspen Shorts Fest 2008 and 3 awards at the 5th London Short Film Festival – the FourDocs Award for Best Documentary the VX Auteur Award and 'Highly Commended' for the Best Film Award. It also won the SXSouthWest Click Grand Jury Prize in 2008. It also screened in the International Competition at Clermont-Ferrand Short Film Festival 2008. In 2009, it won the Shooting People Werner Herzog Competition.

In 2010, she directed a First Cut episode for Channel 4; "Who Do You Think You Were?" explored the phenomenon of past life regression.

On 19 December 2010, Grylls was featured in an Observer article as one of a crop of 'innovative daring directors' making short films for the web.

In 2012, Pinny Grylls made The Hour for The National Theatre, and in 2014 Becoming Zerlina for The Royal Opera House. In 2015, she made Thank you Women for The Guardian. In 2021, she made Skin Hunger for Theatre Company Dante or Die.

She is the director of Hear My Voice, a feature film. It is also supported by the Future Foundation for London.

In 2014, Grylls wrote The Very Best Sheepdog, illustrated by Rosie Wellesley and published by Pavilion Books.

In 2024, Grylls co-directed Grand Theft Hamlet with Sam Crane. The film is about the staging of a production of Hamlet inside of Grand Theft Auto Online during a COVID-19 pandemic lockdown in the UK in 2021. It premiered at the 2024 SXSW Film Festival, where it won the Jury Award for Best Documentary Feature.

== Personal life ==
Grylls is from Hackney, East London, and attended the Children's Film Unit and Westminster School. She studied anthropology and archaeology at Hertford College, University of Oxford. She is the daughter of British artist Vaughan Grylls and theatre designer Gillian Daniell, and stepdaughter of publisher Polly Powell. She is married to actor Sam Crane. She learned sign language after suffering hearing loss in 2016.
