= We Can Be Heroes (2024 film) =

- Directed by: Carina Mia Wong, Alex Simmons
- Produced by: Davis Guggenheim
- Cinematography: Peter Alton
- Edited by: Rebecca Adorno, Alex Simmons
- Music by: Dan Deacon
- Production companies: Concordia Studio, Muck Media
- Distributed by: Tribeca Films
- Release date: March 9, 2024
- Running time: 86 minutes
- Country: United States
- Language: English

We Can Be Heroes is a 2024 American documentary film directed by Carina Mia Wong and Alex Simmons. The film follows kids at a live action role-playing summer camp in upstate New York. It premiered at the 2024 SXSW Film Festival, where it won a special jury award “for bravery and empathy.”

== Synopsis ==
The film begins with three children in their homes talking about their lives. They are all eager to attend a live action role-playing game camp run by The Wayfinder Experience. Cloud loves swordplay. Dexter writes fantasy novels and has crush on someone he met at camp last year. Abby graduated high school after surviving severe health complications which require a feeding tube, and they worry they are not healthy enough for camp.

Counselors and kids arrive at the camp in upstate New York. Many of the campers are neurodivergent. Two writers have created a frame for the role-playing game called "The Last Green" about a fairy world that is eroding. Campers practice feigning death, which many say is cathartic.

For two days, they participate in "The Last Green", breaking character at the end of each day and decompressing with each other. Cloud goes overboard during the game. Dexter is dreadfully afraid of ticks but overcomes his fear. Abby is thrilled to be able to attend. During the game, they play a Healer and plan to return to the camp as a counselor.

== Release ==
We Can Be Heroes premiered at the South by Southwest on March 9, 2024. It is currently seeking a distributor on the festival circuit. It has been programmed at the Seattle International Film Festival, Rocky Mountain Women's Film Festival, Sheffield DocFest, Mountainfilm, and the Nashville Film Festival. It won the Audience Award for Documentary at the Woodstock Film Festival. It was awarded Best Documentary Feature at the Nevada City Film Festival.

== Reception ==
On the review aggregator website Rotten Tomatoes, 90% of 10 critics' reviews are positive.

The Hollywood Reporter saw it as a companion text to the Boys State and Girls State films and concluded, "More than any documentary I’ve seen, and without even a whiff of politics, Wong and Simmons’ film shows the real cost of loneliness and persuasively illustrates how, even in a situation with hexes, spells and elixirs, companionship is the truest magic of all." The Austin Chronicle wrote, "The special thing about We Can Be Heroes, from directors Carina Mia Wong and Alex Simmons, is that it centers on kids." The Stranger raved, "[it] lands somewhere between Game of Thrones and Glee on a watchability scale—which, yes, is a compliment."
