= Sam Crane (actor) =

English actor (born 1979)

- Born: Samuel Crane; 1979 (age 46–47); England, UK
- Education: University of Oxford; London Academy of Music and Dramatic Art (LAMDA)
- Occupation: Actor
- Years active: 1986–
- Spouse: Pinny Grylls
- Children: 2

Sam Crane (born 1979) is an English actor. On the stage, Crane has had leading roles in productions of Farinelli and the King, 1984, and Harry Potter and the Cursed Child. Outside of theatre he has appeared on The Crown and co-directed the documentary Grand Theft Hamlet with his wife Pinny Grylls.

== Background ==
Crane is the son of Richard Crane, a playwright, and theatre director Faynia Williams. He studied at Oxford University and LAMDA, where he won the Nicholas Hytner Award. He is married to filmmaker Pinny Grylls and they have a son and daughter.

== Career ==
=== Theatre ===
Crane played Farinelli in Claire van Kampen's Farinelli and the King opposite Mark Rylance at the Sam Wanamaker Playhouse and reprised his role when the production transferred first to the Duke of York's Theatre and then to the Belasco Theatre on Broadway. He is also known for playing Winston Smith in Headlong's production of 1984 in the West End. Since 13 October 2022, Sam has been playing Harry Potter in Harry Potter and the Cursed Child at the Palace Theatre in London.

=== Film, television, and video games ===
In 2009, he played Fred Walters in the BBC's six-part drama series Desperate Romantics. In Ubisoft's 2015 video game Assassin's Creed Syndicate, Crane played Frederick Abberline. In 2017, he played Patrick Plunket in an episode of the Netflix series The Crown.

Crane, alongside his wife Pinny Grylls, co-directed, executive produced, and acted in the Grand Theft Hamlet, a 2024 documentary film about a production of Hamlet entirely made within the game Grand Theft Auto Online. The film premiered at the 2024 SXSW Film Festival, where it won the Jury Award for best documentary feature, and Crane and Grylls later won Best debut director (feature documentary) from the British Independent Film Awards.

== Selected credits ==
=== Theatre ===
- Harry Potter and the Cursed Child (2022 Palace Theatre, London) as Harry Potter
- Farinelli and the King (2015-2018), Shakespeare's Globe, West End and Broadway)
- 1984 (2014, West End) as Winston Smith
- Eternal Love (2014, ETT) as Bernard of Clairvaux
- The Humans (2013, BAM New York) as Tophole
- The Christmas Candle (2013) as Thomas Haddington
- Father Brown "The Mayor and the Magician" (2013) as William Knight
- New Tricks "Old School Ties" (2012) as Oliver Lebbon
- Casualty "Place of Safety" (2011) as Jim
- Bedlam (2010, Shakespeare's Globe) as Laurence
- Henry IV Part I & II (2010, Shakespeare's Globe) as Hotspur and Pistol
- ...some trace of her (2008, NT)
- The Odyssey (2008, National Theatre)
- DNA/ The Miracle (2008, NT) as Phil/ Mr Rodgers
- Kebab (2007, Royal Court Theatre) as Bogdan
- Othello (2007, Shakespeare's Globe) as Roderigo
- Ghosts (2007, Bristol Old Vic) as Oswald
- Carrie's War (2006-7, Lillian Bayliss Theatre) as Albert
- Midnight Cowboy (2006, Edinburgh Festival)
- The Pretenders (2006, radio)
- Silverland (2006, Arcola) as Mikey
- And Then There Were None (2005-6, Gielgud Theatre) as Anthony
- Major Barbara (2004, Royal Exchange Theatre)
- Rabbit (2003, UK tour) as Spin
- A Little Requiem for Kantor (ICA/ SESC São Paulo)
- Paddington, (1986, Hamilton Primary) as Jonathan Brown co-starring Peter Fletcher as Paddington Bear.

=== Television ===
- Van der Valk "Secrets in Amsterdam" (2024) as Freddie Klink
- The Crown (2017) as Patrick Plunket
- Desperate Romantics (2009) as Fred Walters
- Midsomer Murders "Murder on St. Malley's Day" (2002, TV) as Daniel Talbot

=== Film ===
- Grand Theft Hamlet (2024), as Hamlet. Also co-director and executive producer.
- Napoleon (2023), as Jacques-Louis David
