= Vilnius City Municipal Council =

Lithuanian governing body

Vilnius City Municipal Council Vilniaus miesto savivaldybės taryba (Lithuanian)
- 26 April 2023 – 2027

Type
- Type: City council of Vilnius

Leadership
- Mayor: Valdas Benkunskas, TS-LKD since 26 April 2023

Structure
- Seats: 51
- Political groups: Mayoral coalition (28): TS-LKD (19); Freedom (9); Opposition (23): CDS (8); LLRA-KŠS (7); LSDP (4); NS (2); Ind. (2)
- Length of term: 4 years

Elections
- Last election: 5 March 2023
- Next election: 2027

Meeting place
- Vilnius City Municipality Building, Konstitucijos av. 3, Vilnius

Website
- Official website

The Vilnius City Municipal Council (Lithuanian: Vilniaus miesto savivaldybės taryba) is a unicameral governing body of the Vilnius City Municipality, which corresponds to the city of Vilnius, the capital of Lithuania, as well as the town of Grigiškės and the rural areas and villages of its eldership. It consists of 51 councillors elected in free elections under party-list proportional representation for a four-year term.

The council is chaired by the Mayor of Vilnius. Until 2015, the mayor was appointed by the council. Since 2015, the mayor is elected in separate elections, in a two-round system. The incumbent council and city mayor, Valdas Benkunskas, were elected in 2023.

== Current term ==
Group	Council members
Homeland Union – Lithuanian Christian Democrats	19 / 51
Freedom Party	9 / 51
Centre-Right Union	8 / 51
Electoral Action of Poles in Lithuania – Christian Families Alliance	7 / 51
Social Democratic Party of Lithuania	4 / 51
National Alliance	2 / 51
Independent	2 / 51
Total	51
Source: Official website

A coalition in the council backing mayor-elect Valdas Benkunskas was formed between the Homeland Union and the Freedom Party on 17 April 2023. Artūras Zuokas, belonging to the Centre-Right Union (formerly Freedom and Justice), served as leader of the opposition until 27 November 2024, when he vacated his seat in the council due to being elected to the Seimas in the 2024 Lithuanian parliamentary election. He was replaced by Vydūnas Sadauskas.

On 7 June 2023, Aleksandras Nemunaitis was expelled from the National Alliance for signing the proclamation declaring Zuokas as leader of the opposition and became an independent councillor. On 15 May 2024, Nijolė Jagelavičienė left the Centre-Right Union group in the council and also became an independent councillor.

== Election results ==
=== 2023 ===
Party	Votes	%	+/–	Seats	+/–
Homeland Union	65,718	30.45	+14.23	19	+10
Freedom and Justice	31,537	14.61	−2.66 (Note: Compared with the performance of the public election committee of Artūras Zuokas in 2019.)	9	−1
Freedom Party	29,330	13.59	-15.27 (Note: Compared with the performance of the public election committee of Remigijus Šimašius in 2019.)	9	-8
Electoral Action of Poles	23,892	11.07	+1.60	7	+1
Social Democratic Party	13,811	6.40	+2.47	4	+4
National Alliance	10,416	4.83	New	3	New
Liberal Movement	8,365	3.88	+2.63	0	-
Union of Democrats "For Lithuania"	8,361	3.87	New	0	New
Others	24,421	11.31	–	–	–
Total	215,851	100.00	–	51	–
Source: Central Election Commission

=== 2019 ===
Party	Votes	%	+/–	Seats	+/–
Team of Remigijus Šimašius "For a Vilnius We Are Proud Of"	60,663	28.86	New	17	New
Coalition of Artūras Zuokas and Vilnius Citizens "Happy Vilnius"	36,304	17.27	+5.64 (Note: Compared with the performance of the Lithuanian Freedom Union in 2015.)	10	+4
Homeland Union	34,087	16.22	+0.99	9	+1
Electoral Action of Poles	19,907	9.47	-8.28 (Note: Compared with the performance of the Bloc of Waldemar Tomaszewski in 2015.)	6	-4
Labour Party	16,784	7.99	+4.49	5	+5
Lithuanian Farmers and Greens Union	10,416	4.96	+4.24	3	+3
Social Democratic Party	8,252	3.93	-4.19	0	-4
Others	23,765	11.31	–	–	–
Total	210,178	100.00	–	50	–
Source: Central Election Commission

=== 2015 ===
Party	Votes	%	+/–	Seats	+/–
Liberal Movement	58,448	27.20	+23.51	15	+15
Bloc of Waldemar Tomaszewski	38,138	17.75	+2.18	10	-1
Homeland Union	32,713	15.23	+0.88	8	-2
Lithuanian Freedom Union (Liberals)	24,999	11.63	-6.30 (Note: Compared with the performance of the Coalition "Artūras Zuokas and Vilnius" in 2011.)	6	-6
Social Democratic Party	17,443	8.12	+0.81	4	-1
Lithuanian List	13,826	6.43	New	4	New
Order and Justice	10,310	4.80	-1.40	3	-2
Labour Party	7,523	3.50	-8.48	0	-8
Others	11,463	5.34	–	–	–
Total	214,863	100.00	–	50	–
Source: Central Election Commission

=== 2011 ===
Party	Votes	%	+/–	Seats	+/–
Coalition of Artūras Zuokas and Vilnius	34,136	18.33	New	12	New
Bloc of Waldemar Tomaszewski	28,998	15.57	+5.91 (Note: Compared with the performance of the Polish Electoral Action in 2007.)	11	+5
Homeland Union	26,721	14.35	-3.99	10	-
Labour Party	22,316	11.98	+9.99	8	+8
Social Democratic Party	13,616	7.31	-2.58	5	-1
Order and Justice	11,556	6.20	-17.49	5	-9
Liberal Movement	6,878	3.69	+7.02	0	+3
Liberal and Centre Union	6,302	3.38	New	0	New
Socialist People's Front	5,204	2.79	New	0	New
Others	30,513	16.38	–	–	–
Total	186,240	100.00	–	51	–
Source: Central Election Commission
