= Artūras Zuokas =

Lithuanian politician (born 1968)

- Artūras Zuokas in 2013

Mayor of Vilnius
- In office 19 April 2011 – 20 April 2015
- Preceded by: Raimundas Alekna
- Succeeded by: Remigijus Šimašius
- In office 15 November 2000 – 8 April 2007
- Preceded by: Gediminas Paviržis
- Succeeded by: Juozas Imbrasas

Personal details
- Born: 21 February 1968 (age 58) Kaunas, Lithuanian SSR, Soviet Union
- Party: Centre-Right Union
- Children: 3

Artūras Zuokas (born 21 February 1968) is a Lithuanian journalist, businessman and politician who served as the mayor of the capital of Lithuania, Vilnius, from 2000 to 2007 and again from 2011 to 2015, and as member of Lithuania's unicameral parliament, Seimas, from 2008 to 2009 and from 2024. He was the leader of the Liberal and Centre Union, then YES - Homeland Revival and Perspective and the Lithuanian Freedom Union, and has been the chairman of Centre-Right Union since 3 February 2024.

Because of his numerous corruption scandals and eccentric behavior, Zuokas has become one of the most well-known and infamous politicians in Lithuanian politics. According to a poll organized by the national polling agency Vilmorus in 2007, Zuokas is seen as one of the three most corrupt Lithuanian politicians of all time, alongside Viktor Uspaskich and Algirdas Mykolas Brazauskas.

== Biography ==
=== Early life ===
Zuokas was born in Kaunas on 21 February 1968. With his parents, he moved to Jonava at an early age, where he graduated from the first secondary school. From 1986 to 1988, he was conscripted to the Soviet Army and served in Murmansk.

After returning to Lithuania, he became involved in Sąjūdis and youth political activity, and campaigned for Lithuania's independence. He was one of the delegates in the June 1989 national conference of the Lithuanian Komsomol in which the organization voted to break away from the All-Union Komsomol and establish the short-lived independent Young Communist League of Lithuania. He finished preparatory courses for journalism studies in Vilnius University in 1989 and then worked for Independent Television News as a war reporter in Iraq, where he taped the bombing of the Baghdad TV Tower during the First Gulf War.

Zuokas founded the news agency Baltijos naujienų agentūra in 1992, and worked in real estate and the advertising industry from 1992 to 1999. He invited the Benetton Group in Lithuania and led the negotiations for the establishment of the first McDonald's restaurant in Lithuania. Since 1997, he has participated in politics.

=== Political career ===
Zuokas participated in Valdas Adamkus's campaign during the 1997–98 presidential election as a member of its electoral committee, and joined the Liberal Union of Lithuania in 1999. He was an active supporter of the short-lived "New Politics" coalition between the Liberal Union and the New Union (Social Liberals), led by Artūras Paulauskas, until the coalition dissolved in 2001 and the New Union formed a coalition with the Social Democratic Party instead.

In 2000, he was elected Mayor of Vilnius. At 32 years old, he was the youngest mayor in the history of Vilnius. Zuokas held the position for two terms until 2007, when his party moved to the opposition in the city council. Before the municipal election of 2011, British actor Jeremy Irons expressed his support for Artūras Zuokas and invited people to vote for him in a short video about his experience in Vilnius. In 2011, he was elected mayor for a third term, and remained in the position until 2015. Since then, after the establishment of direct mayoral elections in Lithuania, he has participated in every single mayoral election in Vilnius.

In 2003, after the merger of the Liberal Union, the Modern Christian-Democratic Union and the Lithuanian Centre Union, Zuokas was elected as the first chairman of the new Liberal and Centre Union. He led the party to success in the 2004 parliamentary election, where it won 18 seats - however, he resigned from his seat in order to remain as Mayor of Vilnius. It entered into a coalition led by the Homeland Union after the elections in 2008. Zuokas remained chairman of the party until 2009, when he was embroiled in a corruption scandal regarding the organization of European Capital of Culture activities in Vilnius in 2009. He allowed his favorite Gintautas Babravičius to succeed him in the post.

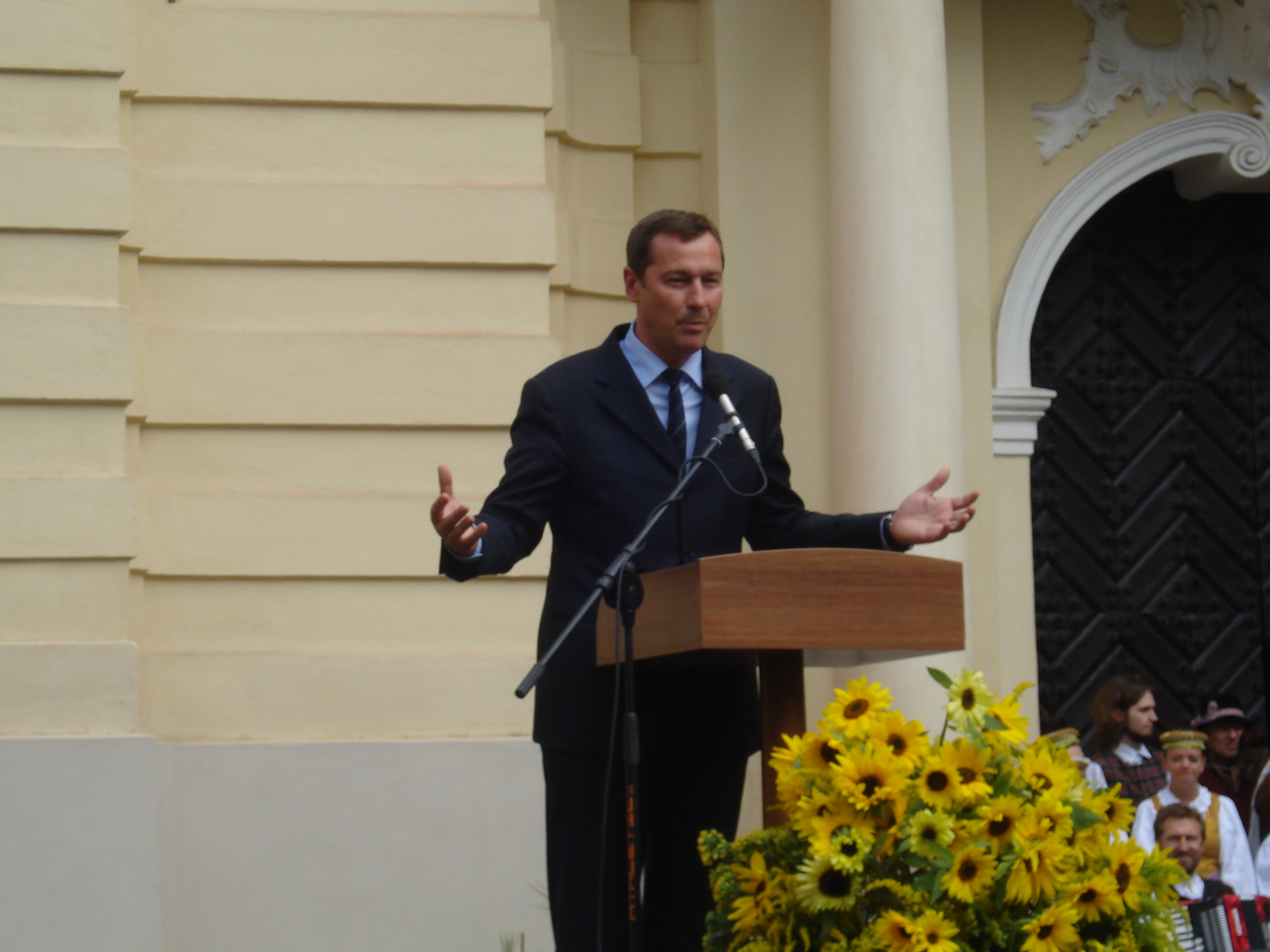
Artūras Zuokas at Initio Semestri in Vilnius University in 2011

In 2011, claiming to have been disappointed by existing Lithuanian parties, he left the Liberal and Centre Union and established YES - Homeland Revival and Perspective, which he stated would follow the ideology of "responsible liberalism". The party proved ineffective and failed to win a single seat in the 2012 parliamentary election. In 2014, his party merged back into the Liberal and Centre Union and formed the Lithuanian Freedom Union, which he also became the chairman of.

Zuokas ran for Mayor of Vilnius in the first direct mayoral election in 2015, but failed to get to the second round. In 2019, he challenged Mayor Remigijus Šimašius, representing the Liberal Movement, but was defeated in the second round and Šimašius was elected for a second term. Similarly, in 2023, he got to the second round of the Vilnius mayoral election with Valdas Benkunskas, the vice-mayor of Vilnius who represented the Homeland Union - but he was defeated with 47.27% of the vote.

Ahead of the 2020 parliamentary election, the Freedom Union merged with Order and Justice and the political movement "Forward, Lithuania!" led by Artūras Paulauskas, creating Freedom and Justice. On 3 February 2024, Zuokas was elected as its chairman after its previous leader, Remigijus Žemaitaitis, was expelled from the party due to his antisemitic comments. He endorsed Ignas Vėgėlė in the 2024 Lithuanian presidential election.

== Controversies ==
=== "Subscriber" ("Abonentas") scandal ===
An investigation into the "dark accounting" of the Vilnius public utilities company Rubicon Group revealed that the company regularly sent large premiums to an anonymous "subscriber" (Lithuanian: abonentas). Using money received from the company, the "subscriber" allegedly attempted to bribe member of the Liberal Union Vilmantas Drėma to vote in favor of Zuokas, and also threatened the politician that he may be found "swimming in the Neris with an engorged belly" if he refused. The Seimas, and later the courts, confirmed that the "subscriber" was Zuokas himself.

Zuokas accused Kęstutis Masiulis of defamation, and claimed in the accusation that Masiulis came up with the nickname "subscriber", which the media began to identify with Zuokas. On 30 June 2006, the Vilnius district court dismissed Zuokas' case. On 20 March 2008, Zuokas was fined 12,500 litas for attempting to bribe a city council member, and the verdict was upheld by the Supreme Court after an appeal.

=== Alleged street tile theft ===
During the reconstruction of Gediminas Avenue from 2002 to 2009, 9 thousand square meters (of a total of 16 thousand replaced) of old basalt tiles were reported to have disappeared. Zuokas accused the former vice-mayor of Vilnius, Stanislovas Šriūbėnas, of poorly managing the reconstruction of the avenue. However, tiles identified as "similar" to old Gediminas Avenue tiles were later discovered in the yard of Zuokas' house as well as at his neighbours, by the "Keturios sostinės" inn in Vievis and in the yard of businessman Kęstutis Kutkauskas.

=== Vilnius 2009 European Capital of Culture scandal ===
Vilnius was designated as European Capital of Culture in 2009, and Zuokas, as a member of the Vilnius City Council, was appointed as the chairman of the committee tasked to prepare the year's cultural events. Their final cost was nearly 300 million LTL, higher than any other European Capital of Culture to date. Zuokas' management of the committee was characterized by lack of transparency, inflated expenses and contract prices, and several members of the city council called for his removal.

=== Divorce and alleged art theft ===
In 2019, while clearing the family's house while in the process of divorcing her husband, Zuokas' wife Agnė discovered 100 boxes of art supposedly by the avantgarde filmmaker Jonas Mekas held in Zuokas' home. During his second term as Mayor of Vilnius, the city founded the Jonas Mekas Visual Arts Centre and purchased a collection of art by the Fluxus collective, which Mekas belonged to. An investigation was held on whether the art was stolen, however, the arts centre reported that the art in Zuokas' home belonged to the politician.

== Eccentricities ==
=== Republic of Užupis ===
Zuokas lives in Užupis, a neighbourhood in Vilnius known for its bohemian and laissez-faire atmosphere, which has been compared to Montmartre in Paris and to Freetown Christiania in Copenhagen. On 1 April 1997, the district declared independence, calling itself the Republic of Užupis, and adopted a flag, constitution, an anthem, and a self-declared president - Romas Lileikis, a poet, a musician, and a film director.

Zuokas was one of the initiators of the independence declaration. He selected 1 April as its day of independence and designed its national symbol.

=== 2011 anti-illegal parking ad ===
In August 2011, Zuokas raised attention to illegal parking in bike lanes by staging the destruction of an illegally parked car with a BTR-60 armoured personnel carrier in a bike lane running along Gediminas Avenue in Vilnius. The stunt was performed in cooperation with a bucket-list show aired on Swedish TV6, and the hosts Erik Ekstrand and Mackan Edlund sat in the back of the armored vehicle. Later that year he was awarded an Ig Nobel Peace Prize for "demonstrating that the problem of illegally parked luxury cars can be solved by running over them with a tank".

This ad became one of Zuokas' most remembered stunts and brought attention to him outside Lithuania. In 2023, Zuokas claimed that he intends to sue Netflix after the airing of the Nobody Hits Like Netflix ad, in which Arnold Schwarzenegger runs over a car with a tank, claiming the idea was stolen from him.

=== Proposal to purchase a Greek island ===
In 2011, Zuokas proposed to purchase the island of Oxeia, owned by Greece, and turn it into a resort and investment zone. He proposed to name the island Dausuva, referring to the geopolitical concept of a "reserve Lithuania" created by interwar geographer and political thinker Kazys Pakštas. The idea was not developed further, and in April 2012, Oxeia was bought by Qatar Holdings.

=== Personal celebrity DNA collection ===
In 2023, Zuokas revealed that he has been collecting DNA samples of Lithuanian and worldwide celebrities for two decades - his collection includes samples of President of Lithuania Valdas Adamkus, John Malkovich, Daniel Libeskind, Steven Tyler, Violeta Urmana, Antanas Sutkus, Antanas Mockus and the Dalai Lama. He claimed that his collection would be used to clone said persons in the event of a global catastrophe.

== Awards and honors ==
Zuokas is the recipient of numerous international and national awards and honors. He was decorated by President Jacques Chirac of France in 2001 with the National Order of Merit, and by President Vaira Vike-Freiberga of Latvia for his contribution to the betterment of bilateral relations.

He was twice elected vice-president of the Organization of World Heritage Cities. The Junior Chamber International recognized Zuokas for his administrative achievements by naming him one of the "Ten Outstanding Young Persons in the World" in 2002. The U.S. Baltic Foundation honored his achievements in 2003 and the Balzekas Museum in Chicago, Illinois named him "Man of the Year". Local awards have included "Friend of Architects". He is a three-time recipient of the popular Vilnius "Iron Wolf" award.

In 2003, Zuokas was bestowed with an honorary degree from the Gediminas Technical University.
