= Nova Lituania =

2019 film

- Film poster
- Directed by: Karolis Kaupinis
- Produced by: Marija Razgutė
- Starring: Aleksas Kazanavičius
- Cinematography: Simonas Glinskis
- Production company: M-Films
- Release dates: 30 June 2019 (KVIFF); 26 June 2020 (Lithuania)
- Running time: 96 minutes
- Country: Lithuania
- Language: Lithuanian

Nova Lituania is a 2019 Lithuanian film directed and written by Karolis Kaupinis. The black-and-white drama film deals with inter-war paranoia, nationalism and the identity crises of the nations occupied by the former USSR. The film was inspired by a real-life Lithuanian interwar political theorist Kazys Pakštas and his works on Dausuva.

It was selected as the Lithuanian entry for the Best International Feature Film at the 93rd Oscar Academy Awards .

== Synopsis ==
During the interwar period, Feliksas Gruodis, a Lithuanian geography professor played by Aleksas Kazanavičius, tries to convince the government to establish a backup state overseas, in order to save their country from ruin. However, the idea is mostly mocked and opposed. Still, there is hope in the secret support from the elderly prime minister, portrayed by Vaidotas Martinaitis. The men debate who they should save – others or themselves?

== Cast ==
- Aleksas Kazanavičius as Feliksas Gruodis
- Vaidotas Martinaitis as Prime Minister Jonas Servus
- Valentinas Masalskis as President Juozapas Palionis
- Rasa Samuolytė as Veronika Gruodis
- Roberta Sirgedaitė as Julyte
- Eglė Gabrėnaitė as Veronika's Mother, Kotryna
- Julius Žalakevičius as General Svegzda
- Vidmantas Fijalkauskas as Dean of the Faculty
- Algirdas Dainavičius as Feliksas' Colleague
- Darius Meškauskas as Simonavicius, Head of the Press Agency
- Paulius Pinigis as Lieutenant Cesnulevicius
- Kiril Glušajev as Minister of Foreign Affairs
- Ridas Jasiulionis as Antanas
- Matas Dirginčius as Student I
- Povilas Jatkevičius as Student II
- Diana Anevičiutė as Post Office Employee
- Indrė Patkauskaitė as Secretary Elena
- Valentinas Krulikovskis as Journalist
- Laima Akstinaitė as Secretary Ona
- Valdas Latonas as Prime Minister Kunigas
- Eglė Mikulionytė as Servus' Wife
- Rusnė Savickaitė as Servus' Daughter
- Kęstutis Stasys Jakštas as Director of the Military School
- Mindaugas Bundza as Government Employee
- Mykolas Drunga as Employee (voice)

== Production ==
Nova Lituania is the first feature film by Karolis Kaupinis and the third collaboration with producer Marija Razgutė (M-films) after the short films The Noisemaker in 2013 and Watchkeeping in 2017. The film is inspired by the life of interwar Lithuanian political theorist Kazys Pakštas and his work on Dausuva, the theoretical plan to create an alternative Lithuania to resist a possible invasion scenario. It has long been derided in Lithuanian culture. A popular post-war Lithuanian film, Adam Wants to be a Man (directed by Vytautas Žalakevičius, 1959/Adomas Nori Būti Žmogumi), parodies him as an atypical castaway from another century.

Karolis Kaupinis became interested in Kazys Pakštas after seeing the modern play Madagascar by Marius Ivaškevičius, which recounts the life of the theorist. He then decided to treat this Lithuanian historical figure in a post-modern way, mixing fictional elements with historical facts.

== Reception ==
The film was generally very well received by critics. It received a 3.4/5 star rating on the Letterboxd based on 1108 votes from Internet users and 66% positive reviews based on 900 votes on the IMDB.

== Accolades ==
Award	Date of ceremony	Category	Recipients	Result
Athens International Film Festival 2019	2019	Best Picture Award	Simonas Glinskis	Won
Cairo International Film Festival 2019	2019	Best Film Nomination	Karolis Kaupinis	Nominated
Karlovy Vary International Film Festival 2019	2019	International Competition	Karolis Kaupinis	Selected
Lithuanian Filmmakers Association Prize 2020	2020	Best Cinematography Award	Simonas Glinskis	Won
Black Movie Festival Geneva 2020	2020	Audience Award Nomination	Karolis Kaupinis	Nominated
Vilnius International Film Festival (Kino pavasaris) 2020	2020	Best Film Award	Karolis Kaupinis	Nominated
Vilnius International Film Festival (Kino pavasaris) 2020	2020	InEuropa	Karolis Kaupinis	Won
Lithuanian Film Academy Awards "Silver Crane" 2020	2020	Best Film 2020	Karolis Kaupinis	Won
Lithuanian Film Academy Awards "Silver Crane" 2020	2020	Best Director	Karolis Kaupinis	Won
Lithuanian Film Academy Awards "Silver Crane" 2020	2020	Best Editing	Silvija Vilkaite	Selected
Lithuanian Film Academy Awards "Silver Crane" 2020	2020	Best Sound	Julius Grigelionis	Selected
Lithuanian Film Academy Awards "Silver Crane" 2020	2020	Best Supporting Actress	Egle Gabrenaite	Won
Lithuanian Film Academy Awards "Silver Crane" 2020	2020	Best Actor	Aleksas Kazanavicius	Selected
Lithuanian Film Academy Awards "Silver Crane" 2020	2020	Best Screenplay	Karolis Kaupinis	Selected
Lithuanian Film Academy Awards "Silver Crane" 2020	2020	Best Supporting Actor	Vaidotas Martinaitis	Won
Lithuanian Film Academy Awards "Silver Crane" 2020	2020	Best Art Direction	Audrius Dumikas	Won
Oscars' 93rd Academy Awards 2020	2020	Best International Feature Film	Karolis Kaupinis	Selected
Lithuanian Film Academy National Awards 2021	2021	Best Screenplay Award	Karolis Kaupinis	Won
Lithuanian Film Academy National Awards 2021	2021	Best Cinematography Award	Simonas Glinskis	Won
Lithuanian Film Academy National Awards 2021	2021	Best Costume Design Award	Monika Vebraite	Won
Lithuanian Film Academy National Awards 2021	2021	Best Supporting Actor Award	Vaidotas Martinaitis	Won
Lithuanian Film Academy National Awards 2021	2021	Best Supporting Actress Award	Egle Gabrenaite	Won
Lithuanian Film Academy National Awards 2021	2021	Best Film Award	Karolis Kaupinis	Won
Lithuanian Film Academy National Awards 2021	2021	Best Set Design Award	Audrius Dumikas	Won
Lithuanian Film Academy National Awards 2021	2021	Best Director Award	Karolis Kaupinis	Won
Lithuanian Film Academy National Awards 2021	2021	Best Make-up and Hairstyling Award	Jurgita Globyte	Won

== See also ==
- List of submissions to the 93rd Academy Awards for Best International Feature Film
- List of Lithuanian submissions for the Academy Award for Best International Feature Film
