= Simonas Glinskis =

Lithuanian photographer

- Born: 13 March 1983; Vilnius, Lithuania
- Occupations: Director of photography, Cameraman
- Notable work: Nova Lituania; Cherries; Hunger Strike Breakfast
- Style: Classic

Simonas Glinskis (born 13 March 1983) is a Lithuanian independent director of photography and cameraman.

== Biography ==
Simonas Glinskis was born on 13 March 1983, in Vilnius, Lithuania.

In 2006, he earned a bachelor's degree in photography and media art from the Vilnius Academy of Arts in the Department of Photography and Media Art. He later obtained a master's degree in cinematography from the Lithuanian Academy of Music and Theatre in the Department of Cinema and Television.

In 2008, Simonas Glinskis, along with Marija Razgutė, founded the production company M-Films, initially producing short films and later expanding to Lithuanian films and international co-productions with countries such as Spain, France, Sweden, Germany, Georgia, and the Czech Republic. They often collaborated with the same directors, including Karolis Kaupinis, Andrius Blaževičius, Marija Kavtaradzė, and Vytautas Katkus.

Since 2008, Simonas has worked as an independent director of photography and cameraman on various film and advertising projects. He notably served as the director of photography on the feature film Nova Lituania directed by Karolis Kaupinis. In 2020, he received the "Ažuolo" awards from the Lithuanian Filmmakers' Association (LAC) and the Silver Crane Award from the National Academy of Lithuanian Cinema, both for Best Cinematography for the same film.

Additionally, Simonas teaches at the Vilnius Technical and Design College in the Department of Design, at the Vilnius Academy of Arts in the Department of Photography and Media Art, and at the Lithuanian Academy of Music and Theatre in the Department of Cinema and Television, as part of the cinematography course.

Since 2014, he has been a member of the Lithuanian Filmmakers' Association (LAC) and served as its president in 2017.

== Filmography ==
- 2007: 7+ directed by Eglė Vertelytė (documentary / feature film / Lithuania)
- 2008: Suicide directed by Mindaugas Sruogius (fiction / short film / Lithuania)
- 2008: 14:56:00 directed by Jonas Trukanas (fiction / short film / Lithuania)
- 2012: Pigus triukas directed by Silvija Vilkaitė (fiction / short film / Lithuania)
- 2014: Katinai directed by Živilė Mičiulytė (fiction / short film / Lithuania)
- 2014: Radviliada directed by Jonas Trukanas (documentary / feature film / Lithuania)
- 2015: Woods directed by Ignas Meilūnas (animation / short film / Lithuania)
- 2017: Watchkeeping directed by Karolis Kaupinis (fiction / short film / Lithuania)
- 2019: Užgesus šviesoms directed by Jonas Trukanas (fiction / short film / Lithuania)
- 2019: Nova Lituania directed by Karolis Kaupinis (fiction / feature film / Lithuania)
- 2020: Matilda and the Spare Head directed by Ignas Meilūnas (animation / short film / Lithuania)
- 2021: Elena directed by Birutė Sodeikaitė (animation / short film / Lithuania)
- 2022: Cherries directed by Vytautas Katkus (fiction / 15 minutes / Lithuania)
- 2023: Kaspervizija directed by Karolis Kaupinis (fiction / feature film / Lithuania)
- 2024: Hunger Strike Breakfast directed by Karolis Kaupinis (fiction / feature film / Lithuania / in development)

== Awards and honors ==
- Lithuanian Filmmakers' Association (LAC) 2017: "Ažuolo" Award for Best Director of Photography
- Lithuanian National Academy of Cinema "Silver Crane" 2020: Nomination for Best Cinematography
- Lithuanian Filmmakers' Association (LAC) 2020: "Ažuolo" Award for Best Director of Photography
- Lithuanian National Academy of Cinema "Silver Crane" 2021: Best Cinematography Award for Nova Lituania directed by Karolis Kaupinis
