= YES (Lithuania) =

Political party in Lithuania

YES – Homeland Revival and Perspective TAIP – Tėvynės atgimimas ir perspektyva
- Leader: Artūras Zuokas
- Founder: Artūras Zuokas
- Founded: 13 January 2012
- Dissolved: 10 September 2014
- Split from: Liberal and Centre Union
- Merged into: Lithuanian Freedom Union
- Ideology: Conservative liberalism
- Political position: Centre-right

Website
- www.taip.lt

YES – Homeland Revival and Perspective (Lithuanian: TAIP – Tėvynės atgimimas ir perspektyva) was a minor centre-right political party in Lithuania. The party was founded by Artūras Zuokas, the Mayor of Vilnius, in 2011.

== History ==
The founder of the party, Artūras Zuokas, served as the chairman of the Liberal and Centre Union from 2003 to 2010, but subsequently resigned from the party prior to the 2011 Lithuanian municipal elections. The objective of the founders of the party was to "shake up the country's political party system", however, this was met with scepticism by some political analysts, who described the initiative as demagoguery. In its 2012 programme, the party proposed a reduction in the number of MPs in the Seimas from 141 to 101, limiting parliamentary terms to two, the exemption of housing and land from taxation, and a slight increase in the minimum wage.

In the 2011 Vilnius City Municipal Elections, the independent candidates of "YES" emerged victorious, securing the largest faction in the Vilnius City Municipal Council with 13 members, including Rūta Vanagaitė, Darius Maskoliūnas, Žydrūnas Savickas and others.

In 2014, "YES" re-merged with the Liberals and Centre Union to form the Freedom Union of Lithuania (Liberals), and in 2020 the party merged with the Order and Justice and the political movement "Forward, Lithuania", resulting in the establishment of a new political party named Freedom and Justice.
