= Juozas Imbrasas =

Lithuanian politician

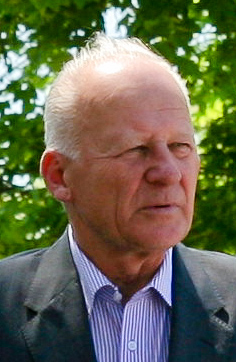

Mayor of Vilnius
- In office 2007–2009
- Preceded by: Artūras Zuokas
- Succeeded by: Vilius Navickas

Personal details
- Born: 8 January 1941 (age 85) Algirdai, Ukmergė district municipality
- Party: Order and Justice
- Spouse: Birutė Imbrasienė
- Children: 2

Juozas Imbrasas (born 8 January 1941 in Algirdai, Ukmergė district municipality) is the former mayor of Vilnius, Lithuania. He is a member of the political party Order and Justice.

== Controversy ==
In 2007 Imbrasas came to international attention for banning a gay rights rally on the basis of 'safety concerns' due to building works. No alternative site for the rally was proposed leading to accusations of discrimination.
