= Watchkeeping (film) =

2017 Lithuanian short

- Lithuanian: Budejimas
- Directed by: Karolis Kaupinis
- Written by: Karolis Kaupinis
- Produced by: Marija Razgutė, Wim Vanacker
- Cinematography: Simonas Glinskis
- Edited by: Ieva Veiveryte
- Production companies: M-Films, Sireal Films
- Release date: 2017
- Running time: 16 minutes
- Country: Lithuania
- Language: Lithuanian

Watchkeeping (Lithuanian: Budejimas) is a Lithuanian short film written and directed by Karolis Kaupinis and released in 2017.

== Plot ==
On a hot summer evening, a father and son try to make mother feel comfortable during her final hours at the hospital. The two men do everything they can to avoid admitting it is impossible to do anything more.

== Production ==
Watchkeeping is the second short film by director Karolis Kaupinis, following The Noisemaker, and the second collaboration between the director and Lithuanian producer Marija Razgutė (M-Films).

To prepare for the film, Karolis Kaupinis visited several hospitals and spoke with doctors for several months. He drew inspiration from the books of Rūta Vanagaitė and Elisabeth Kübler-Ross's On Death and Dying about nursing care in addressing the approach to death in a hospital setting.

In 2018, at the awards organized by the Lithuanian Filmmakers Association (LAC), the "Ėuolas" commission awarded cinematographer Simonas Glinskis of Watchkeeping the Best Cinematography prize and a special mention.

== Cast ==
- Mindaugas Bundza as Son
- Darius Meskauskas as Father
- Pilypas Misiukevicius as Mother
- Sarunas Puidokas
- Dovile Silkaityte
- Donatas Zelvys

== Accolades ==
=== Accolades ===
Award	Date of ceremony	Category	Recipients	Result
Lithuanian Filmmakers Association 2018	2018	Ėuolas Award and Special Mention	Simonas Glinskis	Won
Zagreb Film Festival 2017	2017	Best Short Film	Karolis Kaupinis	Nominated
Silver Crane Lithuanian Film Award 2017	2017	Best Short Film	Karolis Kaupinis	Nominated
Silver Crane Lithuanian Film Award 2017	2017	Best Supporting Actor	Darius Meskauskas	Nominated
Silver Crane Lithuanian Film Award 2017	2017	Best Individual Achievement	Marija Razgutė	Nominated
Vilnius International Film Festival (Kino Pavasaris) 2017	2017	Short film competition	Karolis Kaupinis	Selected
IndieLisboa International Film Festival 2017	2017	Festival selection in the international short category	Karolis Kaupinis	Selected
Uppsala International Film Festival 2017	2017	International short competition	Karolis Kaupinis	Selected
