= Baltoscandia =

Geopolitical concept

Location of the Baltic states and the Nordic countries: Baltic states Nordic countries

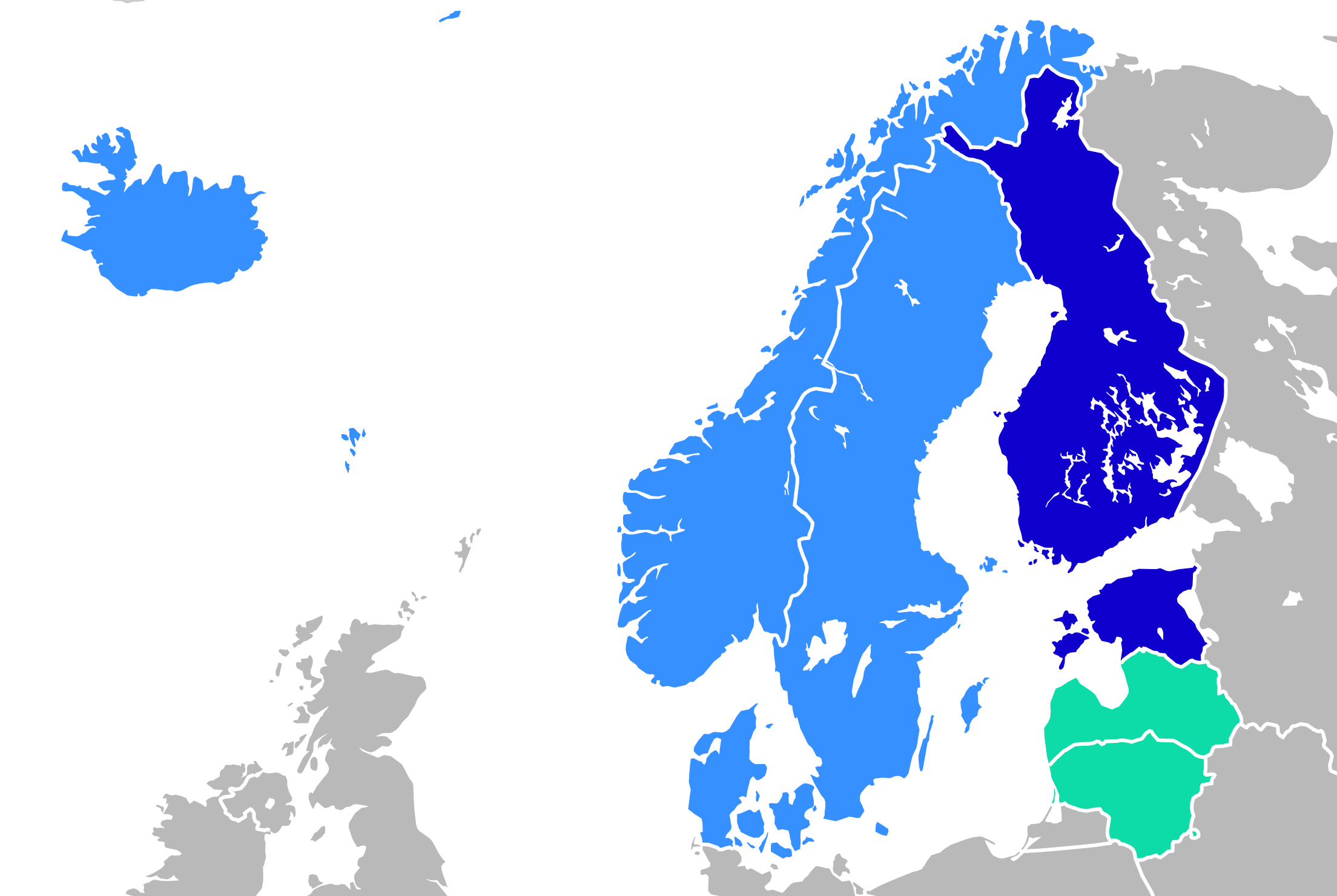
Language branches in Northern Europe: Baltic (Latvia and Lithuania) Finnic (Estonia and Finland) North Germanic (Denmark, the Faroe Islands, Iceland, Norway, and Sweden)

Baltoscandia or the Baltoscandian Confederation is a geopolitical concept of a Baltic–Scandinavian (Nordic) union comprising Denmark, Estonia, Finland, Iceland, Latvia, Lithuania, Norway, and Sweden. The idea was proposed by a Swedish Professor Sten de Geer in the journal Geografiska Annaler in 1928 and further developed by Professor Kazys Pakštas, a Lithuanian scientist in the field of geography and geopolitics.

== Development of the concept ==
Pakštas states in his book The Baltoscandian Confederation that the term "Baltoscandia" was first used by Sten de Geer in an article in Geografiska Annaler in 1928. In this book Baltoscandia is described in several different dimensions: geographical, cultural, economic, political, and military. Kazys Pakštas proposed that one of the ways for small nations to withstand the influence of large ones is to unite and to cooperate more closely amongst themselves. He saw unification as possible only between nations that are similar in size, geographical environment and religion, and that respect and tolerate each other.

== Advocacy ==
For almost 20 years, the Academy of Baltoscandia (Baltoskandijos akademija) functioned in Panevėžys, Lithuania. It was founded on 17 November 1991 as the institute of science researches which regularly organizes arrangements dealing with Baltic and Scandinavian cultural, historical and political contacts. Its main aims were to "develop versatile links of the lands and nations in the region of Baltoscandia and to integrate the culture of Lithuania into the cultural space of Baltoscandia". The academy was liquidated at the end of 2009 because of funding-related problems. The funding was provided by the Panevėžys city municipality, but the functions of the academy did not meet the criteria of the functions of the mentioned municipality.

=== Other terms ===
The Nordic-Baltic Eight or NB8, where 8 stands for the number of countries (Denmark, Estonia, Finland, Iceland, Latvia, Lithuania, Norway, and Sweden).

== See also ==
- Baltic region
- Fennoscandia
- Nordic countries
- Nordic Estonia
- Nordic Investment Bank
