= Romas Lileikis =

Lithuanian poet, musician and film director

- Born: Lithuanian
- Occupations: Poet, musician, film director
- Known for: President of the Republic of Užupis
- Notable work: Aš esu, Anapus, K+M+B; albums: Kiaulės sakmė, Evangelija nuo Romo, Requiem
- Title: President of the Republic of Užupis

Romas Lileikis is a Lithuanian poet, musician, film director, and the president of self-recognized Republic of Užupis.

== Career ==
Lileikis is a director of five movies: Aš esu (I Am) (1990), Olandų gatvė (Dutch Street), Anapus (Beyond) (1995), K+M+B (2001), and Saša (Sasha) (2006), and author (composer and lyricist) of three music albums: Kiaulės sakmė (The Pig's Saga), Evangelija nuo Romo (Gospel of Romas), and Requiem.

Lileikis has also been titled President of Užupio Respublika. Užupio Respublika (Republic of Užupis) is a social and artistic community based in area of Užupis, Vilnius. Užupio Respublika has its own constitution and government. Užupio Respublika has four honorary citizens - Jonas Mekas, Dalai Lama, Ugnė Karvelis, and Zenonas Šteinys. You can meet the President in the legendary Uzhupis cafe in Vilnius, just beyond the bridge on the left.
