= Karolis Kaupinis =

Lithuanian film director and screenwriter

- Born: 9 October 1987 (age 38); Vilnius, Lithuania
- Occupations: Film director; screenwriter
- Notable work: Nova Lituania: The Noisemaker; Watchkeeping

Karolis Kaupinis (born 9 October 1987) is a Lithuanian film director and screenwriter.

== Biography ==
Karolis Kaupinis was born on 9 October 1987, in Vilnius, Lithuania. He graduated from Vilnius University with a master's degree in Comparative Politics. For five years, Karolis Kaupinis worked as a presenter and editor-in-chief of a weekly television program covering political news for a Lithuanian national channel.

In 2013, he wrote and directed his first fiction short film, The Noisemaker, in collaboration with producer Marija Razgutė and M-Films production company. The project was selected at the Locarno International Film Festival in 2013 and screened at 50 international film festivals.

In 2017, he wrote and directed his second short film, Watchkeeping, also produced by Marija Razgutė (M-Films) and screened at various international festivals.

In 2019, his debut feature film, Nova Lituania, was selected for the co-production market at Les Arcs Film Festival and released in 2020 as a historical black-and-white film. It premiered at the Karlovy Vary International Film Festival in 2020. This collaboration with Marija Razgutė (M-Films) was Lithuania's submission for the 93rd Academy Awards in the Best International Feature Film category.

His second feature film, Hunger Strike Breakfast, was filmed in Kaunas, Lithuania, in March 2023. The film, produced by Marija Razgutė (M-Films) in co-production with Background Films (Czech Republic) and Tasse Film (Latvia), explores the hunger strike of Lithuanian television employees following the Soviet Union's military occupation of the Vilnius TV Tower in 1991. It was scheduled for release in 2024.

== Filmography ==
- 2013: The Noisemaker (fiction / short film / Lithuania)
- 2017: Watchkeeping (fiction / short film / Lithuania)
- 2019: Nova Lituania (fiction / feature film / Lithuania)
- 2024: Hunger Strike Breakfast (fiction / feature film / Lithuania)

== Awards and honors ==
Festival and Year	Category	Name of the Movie	Result (Win or Nominated)
Vienna Independent Short Film Festival 2015	Special Jury Mention	The Noisemaker	Nominated
Vilnius International Film Festival 2015	Best Lithuanian Short	The Noisemaker	Nominated
Premiers Plans Festival in Angers 2015	International category	The Noisemaker	Nominated
Lithuanian Film Awards 2015	Best Short Film	The Noisemaker	Win
Vilnius International Film Festival (Kino Pavasaris) 2017	Short film competition	Watchkeeping	Nominated
IndieLisboa International Film Festival 2017	International short category	Watchkeeping	Nominated
Uppsala International Film Festival 2017	International short competition	Watchkeeping	Nominated
Cairo International Film Festival 2019	Best Film Nomination	Nova Lituania	Nominated
Karlovy Vary International Film Festival 2019	International Competition	Nova Lituania	Selected
Wiesbaden International Film Festival 2020	Best Director	Nova Lituania	Win
Lithuanian Film Academy Awards "Silver Crane" 2020	Best Director	Nova Lituania	Win
Lithuanian Film Academy Awards "Silver Crane" 2020	Best Screenplay	Nova Lituania	Selected
Lithuanian Film Academy Awards "Silver Crane" 2020	Best Films	Nova Lituania	Win
Oscars' 93rd Academy Awards 2020	Best International Feature Film	Nova Lituania	Selected
Lithuanian Film Academy National Awards 2021	Best Director	Nova Lituania	Win
Lithuanian Film Academy National Awards 2021	Best Screenplay	Nova Lituania	Win
