= Remigijus Šimašius =

Lithuanian lawyer & politician (born 1974)

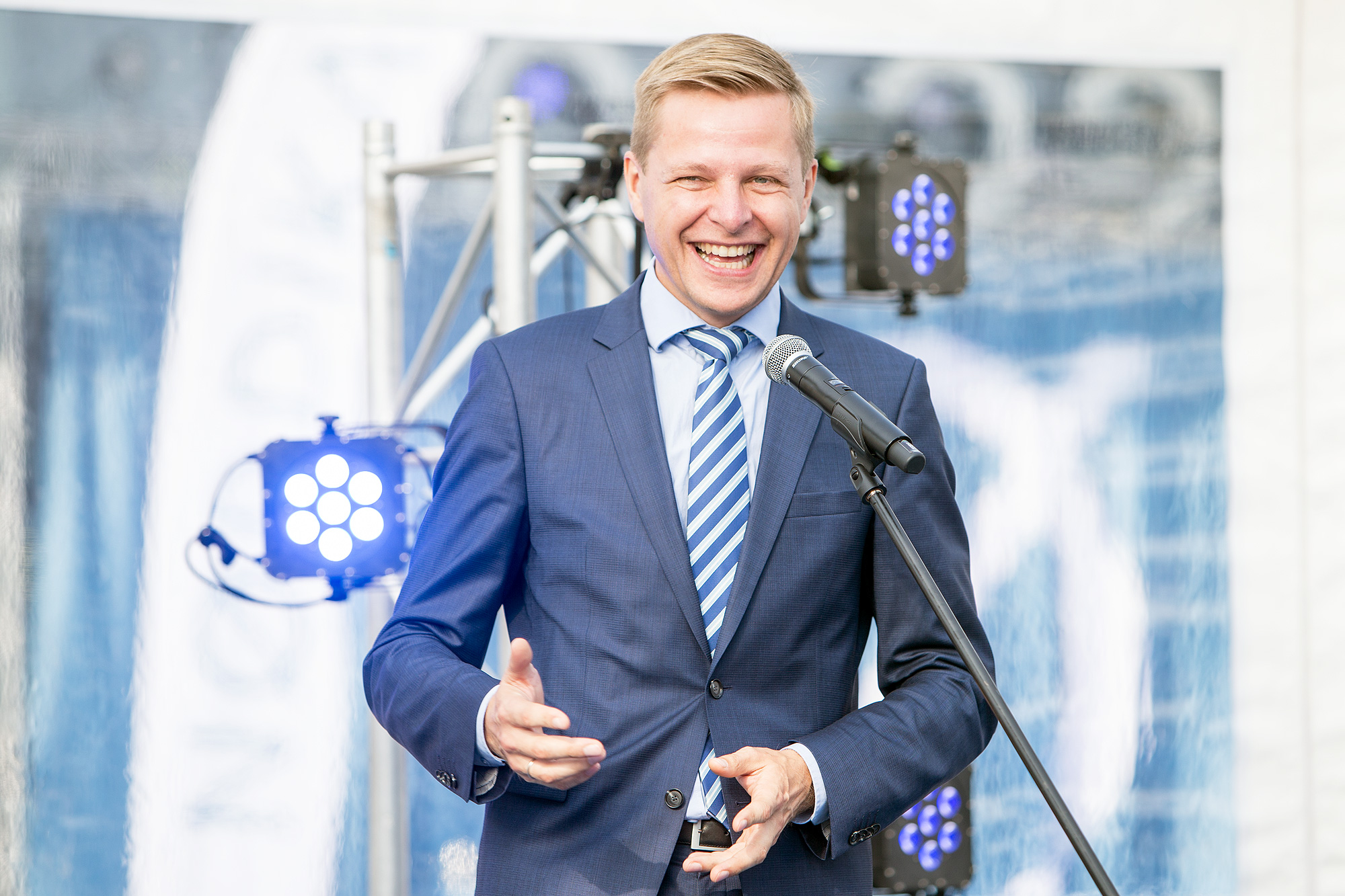

Mayor of Vilnius
- In office 20 April 2015 – 26 April 2023
- Preceded by: Artūras Zuokas
- Succeeded by: Valdas Benkunskas

Minister of Justice
- In office 9 December 2008 – 13 December 2012
- Prime Minister: Andrius Kubilius
- Preceded by: Petras Baguška
- Succeeded by: Juozas Bernatonis

Personal details
- Born: 12 January 1974 (age 52) Tauragė, Lithuanian SSR, Soviet Union
- Party: Freedom Party (2019–present)
- Other political affiliations: Lithuanian Liberal Union (1995–2005); Liberal Movement (2006–2018); Independent (2018–2019)
- Spouse: Gilma Teodora Gylytė (m. 2021)

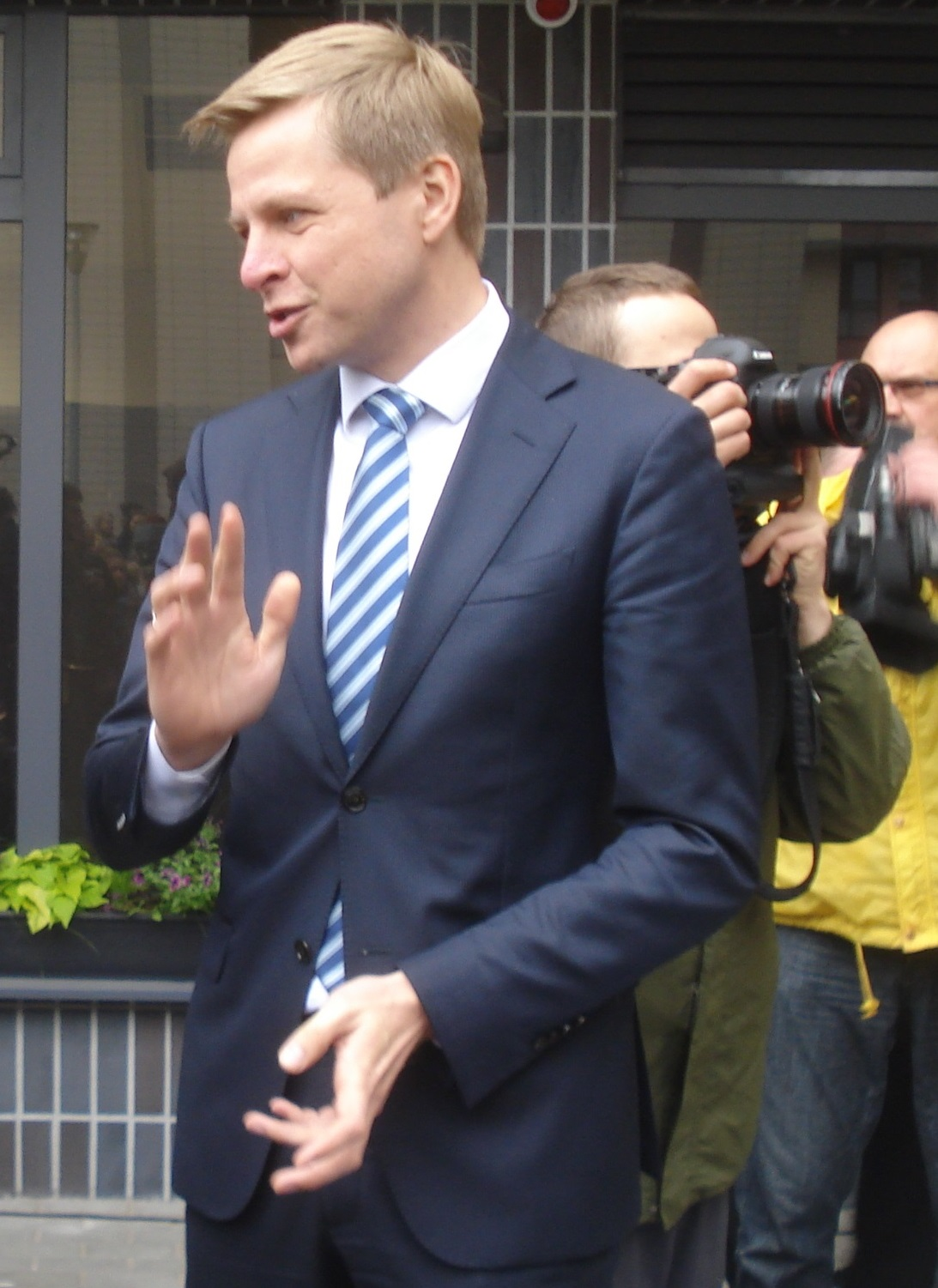

Remigijus Šimašius (born 12 January 1974) is a Lithuanian lawyer and politician, member of Seimas (2012–2015), Minister of Justice (2008–2012), Mayor of Vilnius from 2015 to 2023.

== Education ==
In 1997 Šimašius graduated from the Faculty of Law at the Vilnius University, with a degree in law.

In 2002 he attained a PhD, after defending his doctoral dissertation on Legal pluralism at the Lithuanian University of Law (now Mykolas Romeris University).

From 2006 to 2008 he was the President of the Lithuanian Free Market Institute. From 9 December 2008 to 13 December 2012 he was the Minister of Justice of the 15th Government headed by Andrius Kubilius.

== Chairman of Liberal movement ==
=== Background ===
In May 2016, in the midst of a Liberal Movement bribery scandal, Eligijus Masiulis resigned as chairman and Antanas Guoga took over as the interim chairman. Guoga immediately suggested that bribery was widespread within the party and the party needed to become more transparent, which resulted in an initiative to remove Guoga. Guoga resigned two days after becoming interim chairman.

=== Election and resignation ===
In June 2016, Remigijus Šimašius was elected chairman. Since Šimašius took over, around 20 members left the party. Other members broke off Liberal movement and created 2 new political parties. In October 2017, Šimašius left as chairman after 16 months on the job.

== Mayor of Vilnius ==
As mayor of Vilnius, Šimašius renamed a street that had been named after Kazys Škirpa (who formed the Lithuanian Activist Front which went on to carry out massacres of Jews across Lithuania) and removed a memorial to Jonas Noreika (who ordered and oversaw the killings of Lithuanian Jews in Plungė during the Plungė massacre). He said, "It’s clear that their (Škirpa and Noreika) participation in the Holocaust was not an accident. It’s not about plaques or street names, but about principles." Lithuanian President Gitanas Nausėda subsequently proposed a law that would require municipalities to follow rules from the national government "when installing, removing or changing commemorative plaques", but later tabled the proposed law.

In 2021 Šimašius announced that he will not seek a third term in the 2023 election.

=== Criticism ===
In March 2015, Šimašius was elected mayor of Vilnius.

As a mayor, Šimašius has received extensive criticism for lack of achievements, and poor leadership. Political editors, other mayors and Lithuanian prime minister are among Šimašius' critics. In an interview with Lietuvos Rytas, Šimašius revealed that he has difficult time accepting criticism and has little regard to what other people think about him.

His administration has also been criticized for failing to tackle corruption in public procurement. In particular, Šimašius' deputy Linas Kvedaravičius was criticized for incompetence and lack of transparency, resulting and in a failed vote of no confidence against him. Šimašius himself has been subpoenaed multiple times in the bribery scandal of MG Baltic and Eligijus Masiulis.

In October 2017, Šimašius voted to move Vilnius' central bus station from its central location near to the railway station to Pilaitė, a suburb in the outskirts of Vilnius with serious traffic congestion problems. Plans were met with heavy criticism by inhabitants of Vilnius.

=== 2016 achievement report ===
In April 2016, Šimašius highlighted the achievements over the first year of his administrations, including:

- creating additional 2000 daycare places for pre-school children by lowering the license fee for kindergarten teachers and providing a subsidy for parents opting for private kindergartens.
- renovating 500 meters of sidewalk along the Neris river bank and 10 km of sidewalks throughout the city
- support for innovation, such as Uber's expansion in Vilnius and the addition of Vilnius public transport timetables to Google Maps
- plans to buy 50 new city buses
- restructuring the municipal debt

Opposition political parties criticized the conference for being filled with self-flattery, for attempting to pass the achievements of previous administrations as personal achievements and because highlighted achievements were relatively minuscule . In 2017, there was no annual press conference on administration's two year achievements.
