= Centre-Right Union =

Lithuanian political party

Centre-Right Union Centro dešinės sąjunga
- Abbreviation: CDS
- Leader: Petras Čimbaras (acting)
- Founder: Artūras Zuokas
- Founded: 12 July 2014 (as the Lithuanian Freedom Union); 6 June 2020 (as Freedom and Justice)
- Merger of: LiCS, YES (2014); Order and Justice, Movement Forward, Lithuania (2020)
- Headquarters: Vilnius
- Membership: 4,569 (2022)
- Ideology: Conservative liberalism; National liberalism; Soft Euroscepticism
- Political position: Centre-right to right-wing
- Colours: Blue
- Seimas: 1 / 141
- European Parliament: 0 / 11
- Municipal councils: 56 / 1,498
- Mayors: 2 / 60

Website
- laisve-teisingumas.lt

Logo of the party before its merger with Order and Justice

The Centre-Right Union (Lithuanian: Centro dešinės sąjunga, CDS), previously known as Freedom and Justice (Lithuanian: Laisvė ir Teisingumas, PLT) and Lithuanian Freedom Union (Liberals) (Lithuanian: Lietuvos Laisvės Sąjunga (Liberalai)), is a conservative-liberal political party in Lithuania. It holds soft eurosceptic views.

== History ==
The party was originally founded on 12 July 2014, when the Liberal and Centre Union (LiCS) merged with YES. YES leader Artūras Zuokas became a leader of newly formed party.

In the 2015 Lithuanian municipal election, the party won 4.91 per cent of votes. Its best performance was in northeast of Lithuania. In the 2016 Lithuanian parliamentary election, the party won 2.16 per cent of votes in multi-member constituency.

After poor results of 2019 European Parliament elections, Lithuanian Freedom Union (Liberals), Order and Justice and public election committee "Strong Lithuania in United Europe" started negotiations.

In June 2020, Order and Justice and former MP Arturas Paulauskas' movement "Forward, Lithuania" merged into the party (combining with Artūras Zuokas–led party) and the new movement was renamed to Freedom and Justice. The party was affiliated with ALDE until its merger in 2020.

MPs from Order and Justice, Remigijus Žemaitaitis and Kęstutis Bartkevičius became Freedom and Justice' representatives in the Seimas. In 2020 Lithuanian parliamentary election only Remigijus Žemaitaitis retained his seat. In 2021, Žemaitaitis joined the Lithuanian Regions Parliamentary Group.

On 19 May 2023, Freedom and Justice terminated Remigijus Žemaitaitis membership in the party due to controversial antisemitic comments.

The party managed to regain representation in Seimas after 2024 Lithuanian parliamentary election, when party's leader Artūras Zuokas took single member constituency in Vilnius. It was renamed to the Centre-Right Union in May 2025, with the name adopted during the party congress on 31 May 2025.

== Ideology ==
The party has a conservative-liberal, centre-right profile and is supportive of both the European Union and NATO. The party is in favour of allowing civil unions for same-sex couples. After it merger with Order and Justice in 2020, the party adopts soft eurosceptic stance on European integration.

The party is economically liberal. It supports the privatization of parts of the health care sector and opposes the establishment of a national development bank. The party favours giving tax incentives to companies that hire seniors and opposes progressive taxation. Instead, it wants to lower value-added taxes.

== Election results ==
=== Seimas ===
| Election | Leader | Votes (Note: Proportional representation votes.) | % | Seats | +/– | Government |
|---|---|---|---|---|---|---|
| 2016 | Artūras Zuokas | 27,274 | 2.23 (#9) | 0 / 141 | New | Extra-parliamentary |
| 2020 | Remigijus Žemaitaitis | 23,355 | 2.06 (#11) | 1 / 141 | ▲1 | Opposition |
| 2024 | Artūras Zuokas | 9,367 | 0.77 (#14) | 1 / 141 | Steady | Opposition |

=== European Parliament ===
| Election | List leader | Votes | % | Seats | +/– | EP Group |
|---|---|---|---|---|---|---|
| 2019 | Artūras Zuokas | 24,143 | 1.92 (#14) | 0 / 11 | New | – |
| 2024 | Artūras Paulauskas | 8,458 | 1.25 (#15) | 0 / 11 | 0 | – |
