= Dausuva =

Hypothetical Lithuanian colony in a geopolitically safe area

Dausuva, also known as Atsarginė Lietuva ('Reserve Lithuania') or Žalioji atžala ('Green Sprout'), is a geopolitical concept devised in the 20th century by Lithuanian interwar thinker Kazys Pakštas, which sought to create a Lithuanian colony overseas. It was named after Dausos — a spirit world in Lithuanian mythology.

== Background ==
This semi-independent state was thought to serve as a safe haven for Lithuanians if the Republic of Lithuania would be occupied. Pakštas believed that because of the tensions between Nazi Germany and Soviet Russia at the time, Lithuania would eventually be occupied by either of them and face assimilation by force.

“It is obvious to me that one of those countries will occupy Lithuania. And since both of these neighbours are totalitarian regimes, the wealth and people of Lithuania will be exterminated with brutality, which is unheard of. Not only will they [the people] be robbed, but also spiritual fortunes will be destroyed with great rage, and there will be attempts to eliminate every beam of Lithuanian spirituality and creativity” — Kazys Pakštas.

He also feared that the chaotic and non-directional mass emigration of Lithuanians to the West following the First World War also posed a great threat to the survival of the nation as they were destined to assimilate with other cultures. Pakštas called for the planning and regulation of this migration with the intent to form a colony where Lithuanians would constitute the majority of the population, thus eliminating the threat of the nation's demise.

== Location ==
In Pakštas' own words, since 1924, "little by little, without haste, he explored the possibilities of establishing a second small, but autonomous, Lithuania somewhere far away from the surplus population who had voluntarily emigrated from Lithuania", and that he had looked at many possibilities:

In 1924, I became interested in the clay soils in central Quebec, but they were later already settled by the local French. In 1927, I was interested in colonization opportunities in the state of São Paulo, Brazil, but I learnt that Lithuanians would not get cultural autonomy here. In 1930–31, I explored Angola in southern Africa, but the political conditions did not seem favorable. Southern Rhodesia seemed better then, especially in terms of political rights, but large numbers of British colonists were already penetrating it and the better lands were quickly bought up. In 1939–46, I looked at many areas, which include East Africa (especially Tanganyika), the Mingan Territory in Quebec, the Peace River Valley in Alberta, the Matanuska Valley in Alaska, the New Hebrides in the Pacific, and British Guiana in South America. About three years ago I concentrated on British Honduras. I didn't definitively recommend any of those lands, but I did think they were worth exploring for group colonization.

Pakštas was also interested by Australia, New Zealand and some Oceanian islands. He also considered Western Canada, with its Siberia-like climate, worthy of interest. He had even looked at Madagascar as a possibility. Efforts to establish a colony in Venezuela were abandoned due to the unstable political situation there.

=== British Honduras ===
It was finally decided in the late 1950s to establish the colony in British Honduras. Meetings to set a land purchase or lease deal with local authorities in the territory were held. However, due to the rise of an independence movement in British Honduras, this location was abandoned as well. In 1958, Pakštas wrote that:

"I consider the most important outcome of my research to be that the British local government in British Honduras, in the person of its governor, assured me that the Lithuanian group would immediately receive cultural autonomy, which we currently do not have either in our old Fatherland or elsewhere in the world."

The idea of creating a Lithuanian colony in British Honduras did not receive support among Lithuanians that had escaped Soviet occupation. It was also criticized in Soviet-occupied Lithuania by Soviet propaganda.

=== Bahamas ===
The last considered location for Dausuva were the Bahamas, but support for the project was getting weaker and it was never realized.

== Plan ==
Pakštas had planned the phases in which Dausuva would be created:

1. The "primary school phase" – a village of 25 families with a primary school and a chapel.
2. When the number of inhabitants would increase to 3,000, then would begin the "progymnasium" phase. As the industry and trade would develop, the colony's own newspapers and organizations would be created.
3. In the "gymnasium" phase, the colony increases to 5,000 inhabitants. Then cultural autonomy would be transferred to the territorial one - the creation of one's own state. The rights would depend on an agreement with the British authorities.
4. The "university" phase could be reached in about 25 years. The population due to Lithuanian immigration and a positive birth rate would increase to 60,000. Then it would be possible to have extensive autonomous rights and a university.

== Cultural references ==
Pakštas' theory was featured in the three-part play Madagascar, written by Lithuanian playwright Marius Ivaškevičius. The concept also inspired the making of the 2019 period drama film Nova Lituania, created by writer-director Karolis Kaupinis.

== Sources ==
- Isokas, Gediminas (2002). "Kazys Pakštas". Utenos Krašto Enciklopedija. Utena. Archived from the original on 17 September 2008.
- Jagminas, V. (April 1959). "Naujos erdvės lietuvių tautai jieškant". Aidai (in Lithuanian). 4 (119).
- Kačerauskienė, Gražina (21 July 2004). "Kazio Pakšto idėjos šių dienų Lietuvai". XXI Amžiaus Horizontai (in Lithuanian). 14 (83). Archived from the original on 4 June 2021.
- Pakštas, Kazys (October 1958). "Ieškom vietos "Mažajai Lietuvai"" (PDF). Lietuvių Dienos (in Lithuanian). 8 (87).
- Terleckas, Vladas (25 June 2003). "Kazys Pakštas: žymus geografas, neišgirstas pranašas". XXI Amžius (in Lithuanian). 49 (1153). Archived from the original on 6 December 2021.
- Valiušaitis, Vidmantas (2 November 2008). "Kazys Pakštas: Per gyvenimą – lyg per tyrus" [Kazys Pakštas: Throughout life as through the wild]. Verslo Žinios (in Lithuanian).
- Statinis, Gerimantas (29 June 2015). "Kazys Pakštas: fantazijų profesorius ar genialus geopolitikos strategas? (2)" [Kazys Pakštas: professor of fantasies or a genius geopolitical strategist? (2)]. Pasaulio Lietuvis (in Lithuanian). Archived from the original on 7 June 2016.
