= Kazys Pakštas =

Lithuanian geographer and political theorist

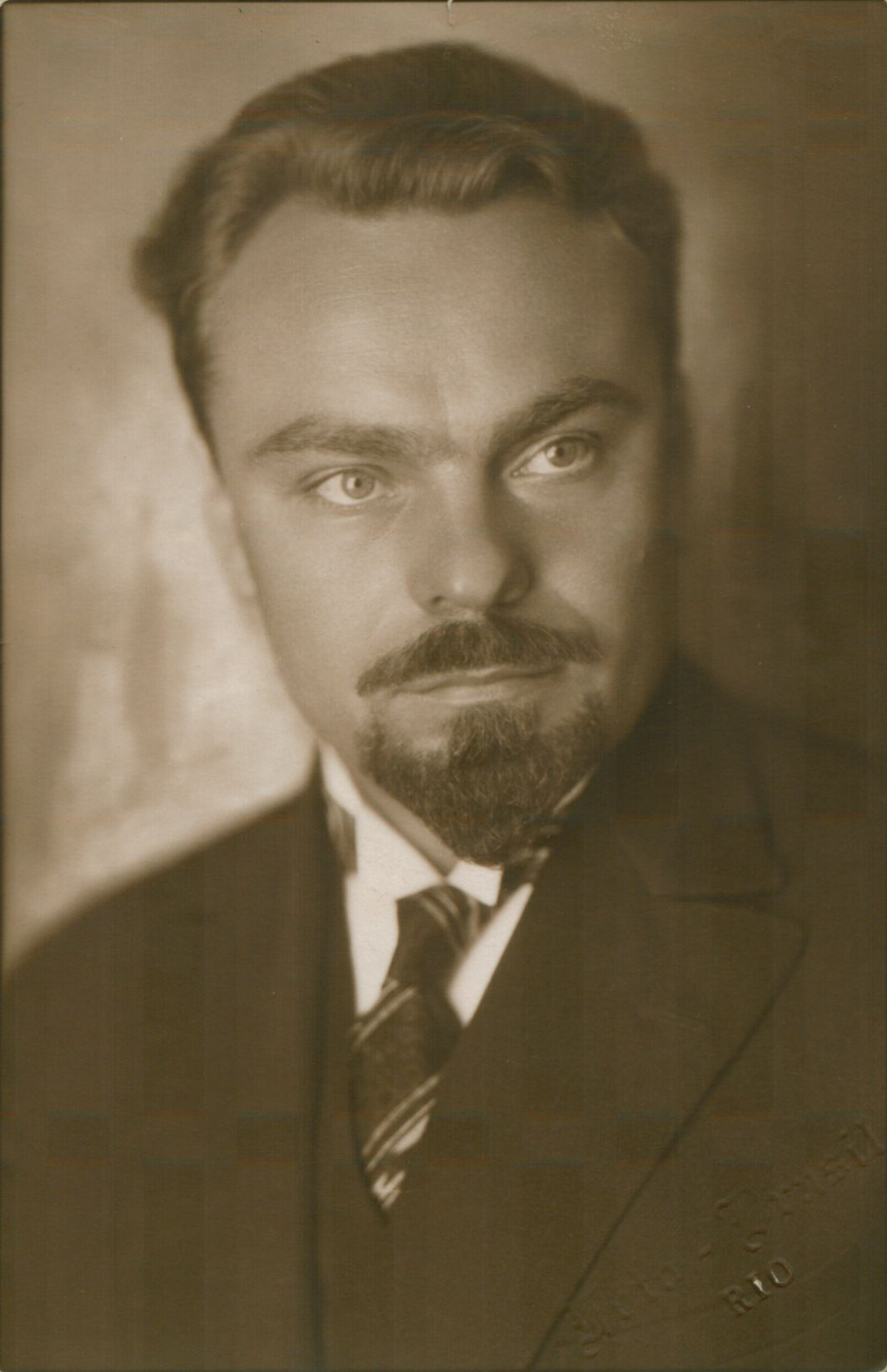
- Pakštas in 1927
- Born: June 29, 1893; Alinauka, Kovno Governorate, Russian Empire (now Lithuania)
- Died: September 11, 1960 (aged 67); Chicago, United States
- Education: Loyola University Chicago (1915); Fordham University (1918); University of Fribourg (1923)
- Known for: Dausuva Theory; Baltoscandia Theory
- Spouse: Ona Pakštienė (m. 1924)
- Awards: Andree Award (Sweden); Order of the Three Stars (Latvia); Order of Vasa (Sweden)
- Scientific career
- Fields: Geography, geopolitics, sociology
- Institutions: University of Lithuania (1925–1939); University of Latvia (1928–1931); University of California (1939–1941); Carleton College (1943–1944); Duquesne University (1949–1954); University of Maryland (1955); Steubenville College (1957)

Kazys Pakštas (Lithuanian: [ˈkɐziːs ˈpaːkʃtɐs]; June 29, 1893 – September 11, 1960) was a Lithuanian political theorist and professor of geography, the pioneer of professional geography in Lithuania. He is best known for his political works on Dausuva and Baltoscandia.

== Life and career ==
=== Early life and education ===
Pakštas was born to a farming family. He was the godson of a famous Lithuanian National Revival activist and priest, Juozas Tumas-Vaižgantas. From an early age Pakštas was fierce, militant and deeply patriotic: he despised the Russian czar and wanted to overthrow him and is known to have participated in the illegal distribution of Lithuanian publications. In 1908, he finished Užpaliai Elementary School and went to Kaunas, where he worked at a printing house. In 1912, he passed the exams of six high school classes as an external student at St Catherine Gymnasium in Saint Petersburg. From 1912 to 1913, Pakštas studied at the Kaunas Priest Seminary but dropped out soon after. Following this, he briefly worked as a pharmacist in Birštonas.

=== 1914–1925: Travels abroad ===
In 1914, Pakštas travelled to the United States, Indiana, where he enrolled in Valparaiso University in 1915. In the fall of the same year, however, he left and began studying sociology and politics at Loyola University instead. He later transferred to the Faculty of Sociology at Fordham University in New York, where he graduated in 1918.

In 1919, after returning to Lithuania, he worked as a liaison officer in the military missions of France, the United States and England. From 1919 to 1923, Pakštas studied natural sciences at the University of Fribourg, Switzerland, and defended his doctoral thesis, Climate of Lithuania. In 1923, after returning to the US, he was an editor for Lithuanian newspapers Darbininkas in Boston and Draugas in Chicago. In 1924, he married his wife Ona Visiliūtė in Worcester, Massachusetts.

=== 1925–1939: Return to Lithuania ===
Invited by the Faculty of Theology and Philosophy of the University of Lithuania in 1925, Pakštas returned to Lithuania in autumn and taught various disciplines of geography. In 1925, he became an associate professor and in 1929 a professor. In 1931, he was transferred to the Faculty of Mathematics and Natural Sciences as head of the geography department. From 1928 to 1931, he would teach geography at the University of Latvia.

Pakštas was a traveller – he visited Brazil in 1927, Palestine and the USSR in 1933. From 1930 to 1931, he went on an expedition around Africa to find a suitable territory for a Lithuanian colony, which would serve as a semi-independent state for Lithuanians in case of a potential threat in their homeland. He visited almost all European countries. However, Pakštas focused on his scientific work as well: he determined the climatic zones of Lithuania and started doing systematic research on lakes.

He distinguished himself as one of the most active founders of various public organizations. Since 1926 Pakštas was a member of the Lithuanian Catholic Academy of Science while in 1939 he was elected as an academic member. From 1930 to 1940, he was Commander-in-Chief of the Future Federation. In 1934, Pakštas organized the Society of Lithuanian Geographers and was its chairman until 1940.

Pakštas also worked on building relations with countries abroad. From 1933 to 1939, he headed the Lithuanian–Swedish Society and from 1934 to 1939 he also served as vice-chairman for the Lithuanian–American Society; he belonged to the Lithuanian–French as well as Lithuanian–Swiss societies. He also participated in the establishment of the Political Club, the Lithuanian Western Union, the founding committee of the Lithuanian Catholic University, and the Romuva Society. In 1938, some Lithuanian public figures such as Professors Stasys Šalkauskis and Steponas Kolupaila even urged him to become a presidential candidate for President of Lithuania.

=== 1939–1960: Emigration to the US ===
On May 31, 1939, Pakštas left Lithuania for a visit to the US. The Lithuanian interwar newspaper XX amžius wrote:

Professor Pakštas and his wife took an evening train from Klaipėda to Gothenburg and went to America on a Swedish ship. In the station, there were crowds of close ones, friends professors, and ateitininkai students to say their goodbyes. [...] Professor is going to the University of Los Angeles [University of California] where he will give lectures on political geography of Central Europe. He will stay America until the fall of 1940 and will visit Lithuanian colonies.

However, following the occupation of Lithuania by the Soviet Union in 1940, it turned into exile. "The farewell was tearful because it seemed as though I will never see the majority of these great people ever again," Pakštas wrote. He became a lecturer and taught geography, geopolitics, and social sciences at different institutions, including the University of California (1939–1941), Carleton College (1943–1944), Duquesne University (1949–1954), University of Maryland (1955) and Steubenville College (1957). From 1954 to 1957, he also worked in the Library of Congress, Washington, D.C..

In 1941, he established the Lithuanian Culture Institute in Chicago and served as its head until mid-1943. From 1950 to 1959, he served as vice president for the Central European Union of Christian Democrats. In 1951, he founded the Central European Federal Club (CEFC) and was its chairman until 1955.

He died on September 11, 1960, and was buried in Chicago at St. Casimir Lithuanian Cemetery.

== Cultural references ==
Fictional protagonist geographer Feliksas Gruodis (played by Aleksas Kazanavičius) from the 2019 period drama film Nova Lituania, which was written and directed by Karolis Kaupinis, was heavily based on Pakštas and his political works.

== Sources ==
- Isokas, Gediminas (2002). "Kazys Pakštas". Utenos Krašto Enciklopedija. Utena. Archived from the original on September 17, 2008.
- Petraitienė, Irena (July 29, 2013). "Tautos ateities vizijas kūręs Kazys Pakštas" [Kazys Pakštas, the one who created future visions for the nation]. Bernardinai (in Lithuanian).
- Terleckas, Vladas (June 25, 2003). "Kazys Pakštas: žymus geografas, neišgirstas pranašas". XXI Amžius (in Lithuanian). 49 (1153). Archived from the original on December 6, 2021.
- Valiušaitis, Vidmantas (November 2, 2008). "Kazys Pakštas: Per gyvenimą – lyg per tyrus" [Kazys Pakštas: Throughout life as through the wild]. Verslo Žinios (in Lithuanian).
