= Valdas Benkunskas =

Lithuanian politician

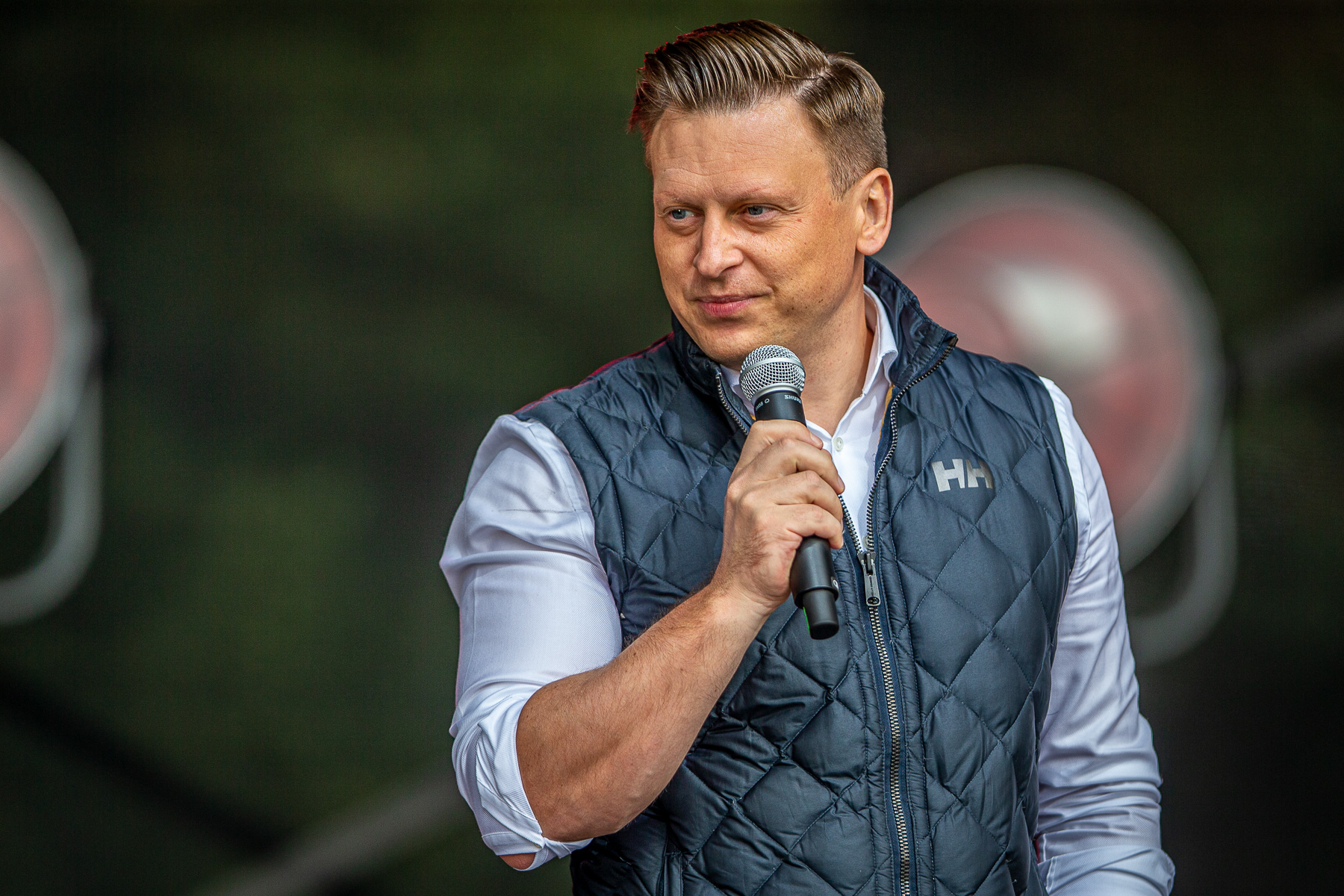

Mayor of Vilnius
- Incumbent
- Assumed office 26 April 2023
- Preceded by: Remigijus Šimašius

Deputy Chairperson of the Homeland Union
- Incumbent
- Assumed office 15 March 2015
- Chairman: Laurynas Kasčiūnas

Personal details
- Born: 1 November 1984 (age 41) Klaipėda, Lithuanian SSR, Soviet Union
- Party: Homeland Union
- Education: Mykolas Romeris University

Valdas Benkunskas (born 1 November 1984) is a Lithuanian politician currently serving as Mayor of Vilnius since 26 April 2023.

== Biography ==
In 2003 he graduated from the Vydūnas Junior High School in Šilutė, and in 2009 he got a degree at the Faculty of Law at the Mykolas Romeris University. From 2008–2015 he was an assistant to Paulius Saudargas, a member of the Seimas.

Since 2011, he was a member of the Vilnius city council. From 2015–2017 and from 2019, he was the deputy mayor of the city of Vilnius. From 2020, he was a member of the European Committee of the Regions.

In the March 2023 elections, he became the mayor of Vilnius. He remains a member of the Homeland Union party.

In November 2024, Benkunskas and his wife, opera soloist Vismantė, announced they are expecting a second child. The couple also have a daughter, Agota Ona.
