= Mayor of Vilnius =

- Coat of arms of the city of Vilnius

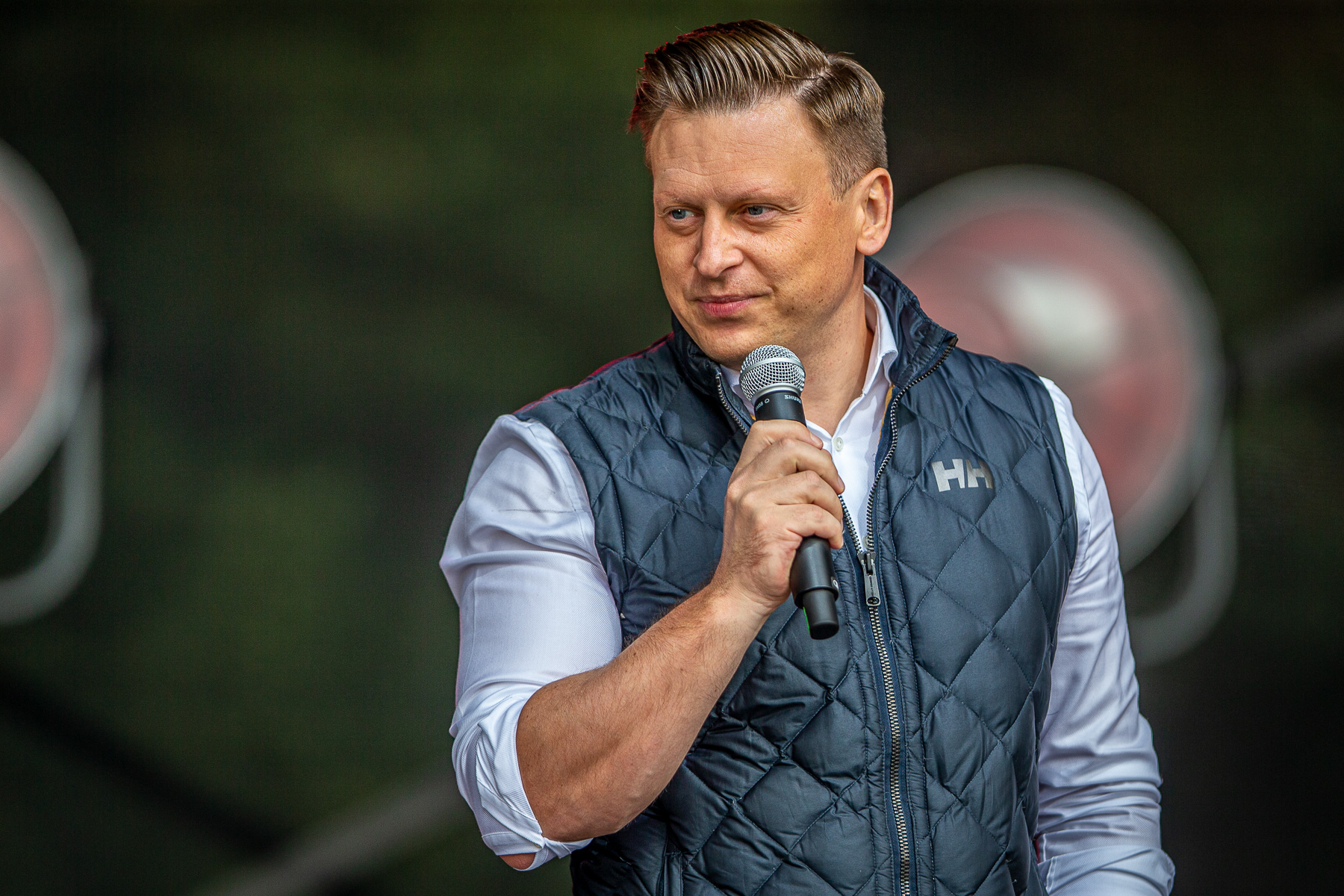
- Incumbent; Valdas Benkunskas since 26 April 2023
- Formation: 1990
- Website: vilnius.lt

The Mayor of Vilnius, officially the Mayor of the municipality of the city of Vilnius (Lithuanian: "Vilniaus miesto savivaldybės meras") is the head of the Lithuanian municipality of the city of Vilnius. The current incumbent is Valdas Benkunskas, following the 2023 Vilnius mayor elections.

== Overview ==
Vilnius city municipality building, where mayor's office is located

The legislative and local executive powers are exercised by the municipality council (Lithuanian: savivaldybės taryba) and the directly elected mayor.

The mayor is both a member and the chairman of the municipality's council. The mayor also proposes candidates to his deputies, the director of municipality administration, and the director's deputies.

== History ==
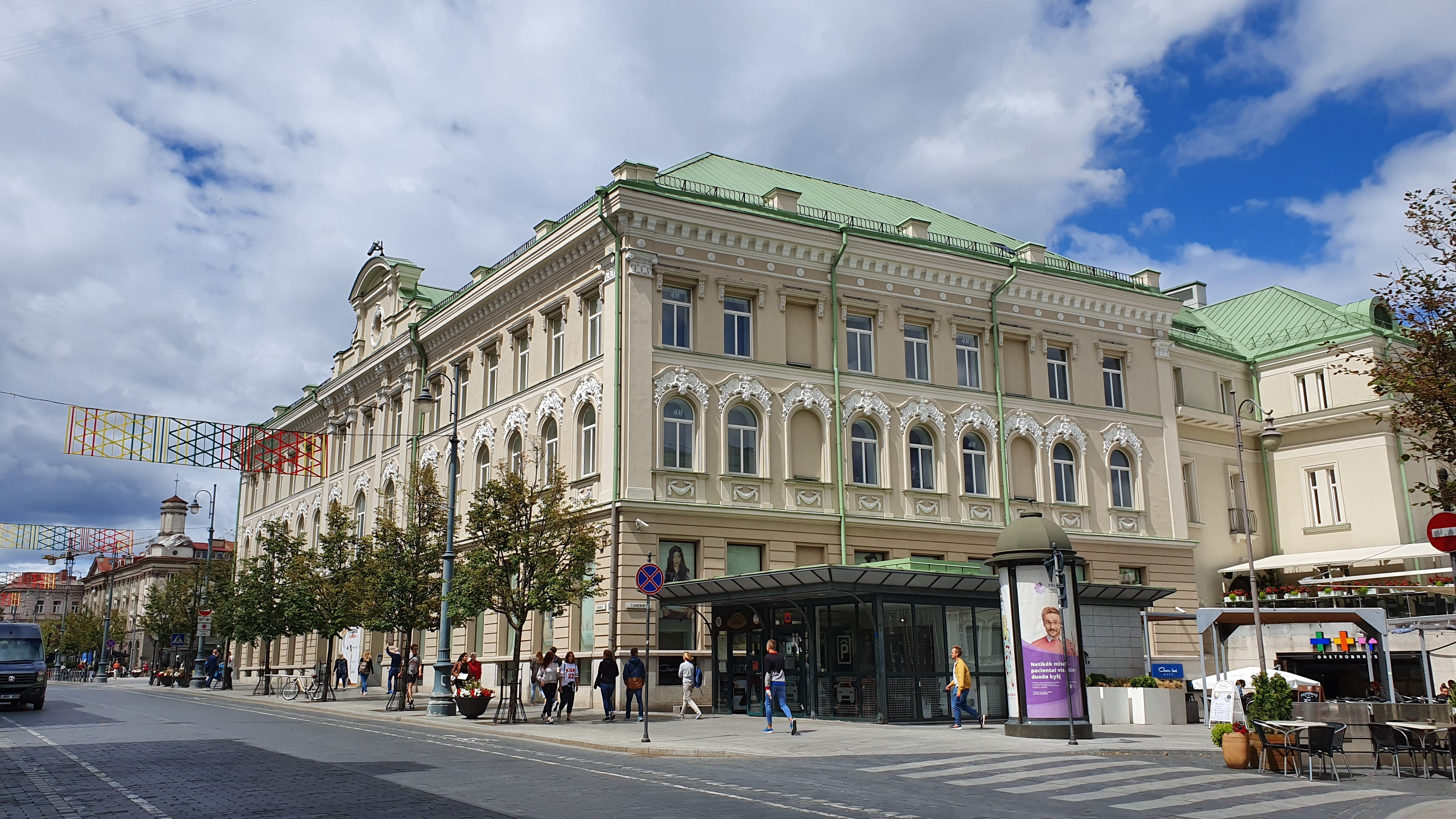
Former municipality building in Gediminas Avenue, used until 2004, now is a shopping mall GO9

The mayor's institution was established in 1990 and it replaced the city's executive committee chairman. From 1990 to 2015 the mayor had been elected by the city's council (since 1995 – city's municipality council). Between 1990 and 2003, the mayor was a member of the municipality's board, which performed executive functions.

Between 1995 and 2003 the mayor appointed (or fired) eldermen.

Since 2015 the mayor is elected directly in a two-round system by voters registered in the municipality.

== Mayors ==
- Michał Józef Römer – 1812
- Afanasiy Yarzhembskiy – 1876-1883
- Nikolay Rubtsov – 1884-1895
- Konstantin Aleksandrovich Golubinov – 1893-1897
- Pavel Vasilevich Berthold – 1897-1905
- Michał Węsławski – 1905-1916
- Marian Dziewicki – 1918-1919
- Witold Abramowicz – 1919
- Witold Antoni Bańkowski – 1919-1927
- Józef Folejewski – 1927-1932
- Wiktor Maleszewski – 1932-1939
- Stasys Žymantas – 1941-1944
- Vytautas Bernatonis – 1990–1993
- Alis Vidūnas – 1995–1997
- Algirdas Čiučelis – 1997
- Rolandas Paksas – 1997–1999, 2000
- Juozas Imbrasas – 1999–2000, 2007–2009
- Artūras Zuokas – 2000–2003, 2003–2007, 2011–2015
- Gediminas Paviržis – 2003
- Vilius Navickas – 2009–2010
- Raimundas Alekna – 2010–2011
- Remigijus Šimašius – 2015-2023
- Valdas Benkunskas – since 2023

== Bibliography ==
- Wałdoch, Jacek (2014). "Postulaty ugrupowań politycznych podczas wyborów do Rady Miejskiej miasta Wilna w latach 1919–1939". Tendencje rozwojowe myśli politycznej i prawnej.
- Wołkanowski, Waldemar (2015). Michał Węsławski. Biografia prezydenta Wilna w latach 1905-1916 [Michał Węsławski. Biography of the President of Vilnius in 1905-1916] (in Polish). Opole.
