= The Noisemaker =

- Poster of the short film The Noisemaker (2014)
- Lithuanian: Triukšmadarys
- Directed by: Karolis Kaupinis
- Written by: Karolis Kaupinis: Nadja Dumouchel
- Produced by: Marija Razgutė
- Cinematography: Narvydas Naujalis
- Edited by: Ieva Veiverytė Karolis Kaupinis
- Production companies: M-films, East of West Cinema
- Release date: 2014
- Running time: 15 minutes
- Country: Lithuania
- Language: Lithuanian

The Noisemaker (Lithuanian: Triuksmadarys) is a Lithuanian short film written and directed by Karolis Kaupinis and released in 2014.

== Plot ==
A distant provincial school is waiting for an official delegation from the Ministry. They're about to bring a new school bell. This is not what the school needs though. Having shrunk throughout the years, it lacks two pupils to satisfy the governmental quota established for any school in the country to exist.

The gift from the capital is a threat for the survival of the school. Anticipating the arrival of the delegation, the principal makes his best to mask the lack of pupils and avoid the unavoidable school closure.

== Cast ==
- Valentinas Masalskis as Principal
- Sarunas Puidokas as Caretaker
- Aldona Bendoriute as Guardian
- Valerijus Jevsejevas as Teacher
- Elona Karoblyte as Customer
- Neringa Krungleviciute as Teacher
- Tomas Kutkaitis as Traveling Teacher
- Jelena Mastakova as The Boy
- Igoris Reklaitis as Salesman
- Mile Sablauskaite as Priest
- Nijole Sabulyte as Mailwoman
- Vita Siauciunaite as Teacher
- Irena Simonaityte as Teacher
- Dalia Storyk as Teacher
- Zivile Subaciute as Teacher
- Kristina Svencionyte as Traveling Teacher
- Justina Vaiksnoraite as Traveling Teacher
- Diana Valiusaitiene as Traveling Teacher
- Vaclovas Zebrauskas as Librarian
- Velta Zygure as Customer

== Production ==
The Noisemaker is the debut short film of Karolis Kaupinis and his first collaboration with Lithuanian producer Marija Razgutė (M-Films).

Both of the director's parents were schoolteachers, leading him to make a short film about the closure of schools in rural areas, a common phenomenon in Lithuania since the 1990s. The short was filmed in an elementary school in the city of Vilnius, Lithuania.

The Noisemaker was the first Lithuanian film to be selected for the Locarno Film Festival in 20 years, since 1994.

== Awards and Recognitions ==
Award	Date of ceremony	Category	Recipients	Result
2Annas International Short Film Festival 2014	2014	Best Baltic Short Film	Karolis Kaupinis	Won
Tallinn Black Nights Film Festival 2014	2014	Baltic Films category	Karolis Kaupinis	Nominated
Locarno Film Festival 2014	2014	International category	Karolis Kaupinis	Nominated
Lithuanian Film Academy "Silver Crane" Awards 2015	2015	Best Lithuanian Fiction	Karolis Kaupinis	Won
Lithuanian Film Academy "Silver Crane" Awards 2015	2015	Best Actor	Valentinas Masalskis	Won
Vienna Independent Short Film Festival 2015	2015	Special Jury Mention	Karolis Kaupinis	Nominated
Vilnius International Film Festival 2015	2015	Best Lithuanian Short	Karolis Kaupinis	Won
Premiers Plans Festival in Angers 2015	2015	International category	Karolis Kaupinis	Nominated
