= 2012 Stockholm International Film Festival =

2012 film festival edition

23rd Stockholm International Film Festival
- Opening film: Call Girl
- Location: Stockholm, Sweden
- Founded: 1990
- Awards: Bronze Horse
- Festival date: 7–18 November 2012
- Website: http://www.stockholmfilmfestival.se/en

The 23rd Stockholm International Film Festival took place between 7 and 18 November 2012. American actor Peter Fonda was head of the jury. The Bronze Horse for best picture was won by the Australian/German film Lore, directed by Cate Shortland.

== Feature Film sections ==
=== In competition ===
The following films competed for the main prize, the Bronze Horse. The director of a film in the competition may not have made more than 3 films (this one included).

English title	Original title	Director(s)	Country
90 Minutes	90 minutter	Eva Sørhaug	Norway
After Lucia	Después de Lucía	Michel Franco	Mexico
Augustine	—N/a	Alice Winocour	France
Beasts of the Southern Wild	—N/a	Benh Zeitlin	USA
Bekas	—N/a	Karzan Kader	Sweden, Finland, Iraq
Beyond the Walls	Hors les murs	David Lambert	Belgium, Canada, France
Broken	—N/a	Rufus Norris	UK
Call Girl	—N/a	Mikael Marcimain	Sweden, Ireland, Norway, Finland
The Color of the Chameleon	Tsvetat na Hameleona	Emil Hristov	Bulgaria
Compliance	—N/a	Craig Zobel	USA
Killing Them Softly	—N/a	Andrew Dominik	USA
Lore	—N/a	Cate Shortland	Australia, Germany, UK
Lotus	—N/a	Liu Shu	China
Middle of Nowhere	—N/a	Ava DuVernay	USA
My Brother the Devil	—N/a	Sally El Hosaini	UK
Roland Hassel	Hassel - Privatspanarna	Måns Månsson	Sweden
Sister	L'enfant d'en haut	Ursula Meier	Switzerland, France
Tabu	—N/a	Miguel Gomes	Portugal, Germany, Brazil, France
Una Noche	—N/a	Lucy Mulloy	USA, Cuba, UK
Wish You Were Here	—N/a	Kieran Darcy-Smith	Australia

=== Open Zone ===
The films in the Open Zone section competed for the FIPRESCI Award.

English title	Original title	Director(s)	Country
A Few Hours of Spring	Quelques heures de printemps	Stéphane Brizé	France
Amour	—N/a	Michael Haneke	France, Germany, Austria
Another Woman's Life	La vie d'une autre	Sylvie Testud	France
Arbitrage	—N/a	Nicholas Jarecki	USA
Blancanieves	—N/a	Pablo Berger	Spain
Caesar Must Die	Caesar deve morire	Paolo and Vittorio Taviani	Italy
Do Not Disturb	—N/a	Yvan Attal	France
Everyday	—N/a	Michael Winterbottom	UK
Farewell, My Queen	Les adieux à la reine	Benoît Jacquot	France
Flight	—N/a	Robert Zemeckis	USA
Holy Motors	—N/a	Leos Carax	France, Germany
In Another Country	다른 나라에서, Dareun naraeseo	Hong Sang-soo	South Korea
Just the Wind	Csak a szél	Benedek Fliegauf	Hungary, Germany, France
The Last Sentence	Dom över död man	Jan Troell	Sweden
Like Someone in Love	—N/a	Abbas Kiarostami	France, Japan
The Master	—N/a	Paul Thomas Anderson	USA
Outrage Beyond	アウトレイジ ビヨンド, Autoreiji: Biyondo	Takeshi Kitano	Japan
The Parade	Parada	Srđan Dragojević	Serbia, Croatia, Macedonia, Slovenia, Montenegro
Pietà	피에타, Pietà	Kim Ki-duk	South Korea
Post Tenebras Lux	—N/a	Carlos Reygadas	Mexico, France, Germany, Netherlands
Rust and Bone	De rouille et d'os	Jacques Audiard	France, Belgium
War Witch	Rebelle	Kim Nguyen	Canada
The We and the I	—N/a	Michel Gondry	USA, France
Winter of Discontent	El sheita elli fat	Ibrahim El Batout	Egypt

=== American Independents ===
"Fresh Indies from the mavericks of American film".

English title	Original title	Director(s)	Country
28 Hotel Rooms	—N/a	Matt Ross	USA
About Cherry	—N/a	Stephen Elliott	USA
An Oversimplification of Her Beauty	—N/a	Terence Nance	USA
California Solo	—N/a	Marshall Lewy	USA
The Comedy	—N/a	Rick Alverson	USA
Francine	—N/a	Melanie Shatzky, Brian M. Cassidy	USA
Frankie Go Boom	—N/a	Jordan Roberts	USA
Hello I Must Be Going	—N/a	Todd Louiso	USA
Nobody Walks	—N/a	Ry Russo-Young	USA
The Paperboy	—N/a	Lee Daniels	USA
Ruby Sparks	—N/a	Jonathan Dayton and Valerie Faris	USA
Safety Not Guaranteed	—N/a	Colin Trevorrow	USA
The Sessions	—N/a	Ben Lewin	USA
Simon Killer	—N/a	Antonio Campos	France, USA
Smashed	—N/a	James Ponsoldt	USA
While We Were Here	—N/a	Kat Coiro	USA

=== Asian Images ===
"A panorama from one of the most creative and interesting filmmaking areas in the world."

English title	Original title	Director(s)	Country
10+10	—N/a	Wang Toon, Shen Ko-shang, Kevin Chu, Ho Wi-ding, Yang Ya-che, Wu Nieh-jen, Wang Shaudi, Chen Kuo-fu, Hou Chi-jan, Hsiao Ya-chuan, Wei Te-sheng, Chen Yu-hsun, Chang Tso-chi, Leon Dai, Arvin Chen, Cheng Wen-tang, Sylvia Chang, Cheng Yu-chieh, Chung Mong-hung, Hou Hsiao-hsien	Taiwan
Ace Attorney	逆転裁判, Gyakuten Saiban	Takashi Miike	Japan
The Animals	—N/a	Gino M. Santos	Philippines
Egg and Stone	Jidan he shitou	Huang Ji	China
Gangs of Wasseypur - Part 1 & Part 2	—N/a	Anurag Kashyap	India
Him, Here, After	Ini Avan	Asoka Handagama	Sri Lanka
Isn't Anyone Alive?	生きてるものはいないのか, Ikiteru mono wa inainoka?	Gakuryū Ishii	Japan
Land of Hope	希望の国, Kibou no kuni	Sion Sono	Japan
Love Me Not	—N/a	Glitte Pik Chi Leung	Hong Kong
Miss Lovely	—N/a	Ashim Ahiluwalia	India
Nameless Gangster: Rules of the Time	범죄와의 전쟁, Bumchoiwaui Junjaeng	Yoon Jong-bin	South Korea
Noor	Jhoole lal	Çagla Zencirci, Guillaume Giovanetti	France, Pakistan
Our Homeland	一かぞくのくに, Kazuko no kuni	Yang Yong-hi	Japan
Peculiar Vacation and Other Illnesses	Vakansi yang janggal dan penyakit lainnya	Yosep Anggi Noen	Indonesia
Peddlers	—N/a	Vasan Bala	India
Rent-a-Cat	レンタネコ, Rentaneko	Naoko Ogigami	Japan
The Taste of Money	돈의 맛, Donui Mat	Im Sang-soo	South Korea
Vulgaria	低俗喜劇, Dai juk hei kek	Pang Ho-cheung	Hong Kong
Young Dudes	騷人, Sao ren	DJ Chen Yin-jung	Taiwan

=== Latin Visions ===
"The hottest features from the artistically vibrant countries in Latin America and Spain."

English title	Original title	Director(s)	Country
3	—N/a	Pablo Stoll	Uruguay, Argentina, Germany
7 Boxes	7 cajas	Juan Carlos Maneglia, Tana Schémbori	Paraguay
Father's Chair	A cadeira do pai	Luciano Moura	Brazil
Field of Amapolas	Jardin de Amapolas	Juan Carlos Melo Guevara	Colombia
Good Luck, Sweetheart	Boa sorte, meu amor	Daniel Aragão	Brazil
Here and There	Aquí y allá	Antonio Méndez Esparza	Spain, USA, Mexico
La Playa DC	—N/a	Juan Andrés Arango	Colombia
She Doesn't Want to Sleep Alone	No quiero dormir sola	Natalia Beristáin	Mexico
Six Points About Emma	Seis puntos sobre Emma	Roberto Pérez-Toledo	Spain
Violeta Went to Heaven	Violeta se fue a los cielos	Andrés Wood	Chile
Xingu	—N/a	Cao Hamburger	Brazil
Young & Wild	Joven & Alocada	Marialy Rivas	Chile

=== Spotlight: Power ===
"This year the spotlight is on Power. Twelve ravishing films explore different shapes of power in politics, art and in the personal relationship."

English title	Original title	Director(s)	Country
About Face: Supermodels Then and Now	—N/a	Timothy Greenfield-Sanders	USA
Camp 14–Total Control Zone	—N/a	Marc Wiese	Germany
The Central Park Five	—N/a	Ken Burns, Sarah Burns, David McMahon	USA
The Company You Keep	—N/a	Robert Redford	USA
Knife Fight	—N/a	Bill Guttentag	USA
Love, Marilyn	—N/a	Liz Garbus	USA
Night of Silence	Lal gece	Reis Çelik	Turkey
Operation E	—N/a	Miguel Courtois Paternina	Spain, France
The Pervert's Guide to Ideology	—N/a	Sophie Fiennes	UK, Ireland
Tito on Ice	—N/a	Max Andersson	Germany, Sweden
Tomorrow	Zavtra	Andrey Gryazev	Russia
Water	Mayim	Nir Sa'ar, Maya Sarfaty, Mohammad Fuad, Yona Rozenkier, Mohammad Bakri, Ahmad Bargouthi, Pini Tavger, Tal Haring	Israel, Palestine, France

=== Twilight Zone ===
"Radical films exploring new contemporary cinematic subcultures and genres."

English title	Original title	Director(s)	Country
Black's Game	Svartur á leik	Óskar Thór Axelsson	Iceland
The Body	El cuerpo	Oriol Paulo	Spain
Citadel	—N/a	Ciarán Foy	Ireland, Scotland
Doomsday Book	인류멸망보고서, Inryu myeongmang bogoseo	Kim Jee-woon, Yim Pil-sung	South Korea
Here Comes the Devil	Ahi va el Diablo	Adrián García Bogliano	Mexico
Ill Manors	—N/a	Ben Drew	UK
Kiss of the Damned	—N/a	Xan Cassavetes	USA
L	—N/a	Babis Makridis	Greece
The Last Will and Testament of Rosalind Leigh	—N/a	Rodrigo Gudiño	Canada
The Legend of Kaspar Hauser	La leggenda di Kaspar Hauser	David Manuli	Italy
Painless	Insensible	Juan Carlos Medina	France, Spain, Portugal
Sinister	—N/a	Scott Derrickson	USA
Tai Chi 0	—N/a	Stephen Fung	Hong Kong
Wrong	—N/a	Quentin Dupieux	France

=== Documania ===
"A selection of illuminating and experimental documentaries that centers on the contemporary, controversial and personal."

English title	Original title	Director(s)	Country
Anton Corbijn Inside Out	—N/a	Klaartje Quirijns	UK, Netherlands
As the Strawberries Would Taste	Som jordgubbarna smakade	Anders Hellström	Sweden
Beware of Mr. Baker	—N/a	Jay Bulger	USA
Bob Wilson's Life & Death of Marina Abramović	—N/a	Giada Colagrande	Spain
Canned Dreams	Säilöttyjä unelmia	Katja Gauriloff	Finland
China Heavyweight	Qian chui bai lian	Yung Chang	Canada, China, Finland, Japan, UK
Despite the Gods	—N/a	Penny Vozniak	Australia
High Tech, Low Life	—N/a	Stephen Maing	USA, China
It was Better Tomorrow	Yaa man aach	Hinde Boujemaa	Tunisia
The Labèque Way	—N/a	Félix Cábez	Spain
Moon Rider	—N/a	Daniel Dencik	Denmark, Sweden
Planet Ocean	Planète Océan	Yann Arthus-Bertrand, Michaël Pitiot	France
The Queen of Versailles	—N/a	Lauren Greenfield	USA
The Secret Disco Revolution	—N/a	Jamie Kastner	Canada
Shut Up and Play the Hits	—N/a	Dylan Southern, Will Lovelace	UK
Step Up to the Plate	Entre les Bras	Paul Lacoste	France
Steve Jobs: The Lost Interview	—N/a	Paul Sen	USA
Stolen Seas	—N/a	Thymaya Payne	Estonia, Philippines, Denmark, USA, Somalia, Canada
Stories We Tell	—N/a	Sarah Polley	Canada
Tropicália	—N/a	Marcelo Machado	Brazil
Vito	—N/a	Jeffrey Schwarz	USA
The World Before Her	—N/a	Nisha Pahuja	Canada

== Juries ==
Competition

- Peter Fonda, American actor (President)
- Anna Croneman, Swedish producer
- Karolina Ramqvist, Swedish writer
- Srđan Dragojević, Serbian director
- Antonio Campos, American director
- Malin Crépin, Swedish actress

FIPRESCI Award

- Dragan Jurak, Croatian film critic
- Margarita Chapatte, Spanish broadcaster
- Florian Vollmers, German film critic

== Awards ==
In Competition

- Bronze Horse for Best Picture - Lore by Cate Shortland
- Best Directorial debut - Benh Zeitlin for Beasts of the Southern Wild
- Best Screenplay - Andrew Dominik for Killing Them Softly
- Best Actress - Saskia Rosendahl for Lore
- Best Actor - Tim Roth for Broken
- Best Cinematography - Adam Arkapaw for Lore
- Best Music - Max Richter for Lore

Independent Awards

- FIPRESCI-Award - Everyday by Michael Winterbottom
- Telia Film Award - Una Noche by Lucy Mulloy
- Silver Audience Award - Call Girl by Mikael Marcimain

Lifetime Awards

- Stockholm Achievement Award - Willem Dafoe
- Stockholm Lifetime Achievement Award - Jan Troell
- Stockholm Visionary Award - Jacques Audiard
