= 29th Independent Spirit Awards =

US film awards ceremony in 2014

- Awarded for: Best in independent film
- Date: March 1, 2014
- Site: Santa Monica Pier; Santa Monica, California, U.S.
- Hosted by: Patton Oswalt

Highlights
- Best Feature: 12 Years a Slave
- Most awards: 12 Years a Slave (5)
- Most nominations: 12 Years a Slave (7)

Television coverage
- Channel: IFC

The 29th Independent Spirit Awards, honoring the best independent films of 2013, were presented on March 1, 2014. The nominations were announced on November 27, 2013. The ceremony was hosted by Patton Oswalt.

== Winners and nominees ==
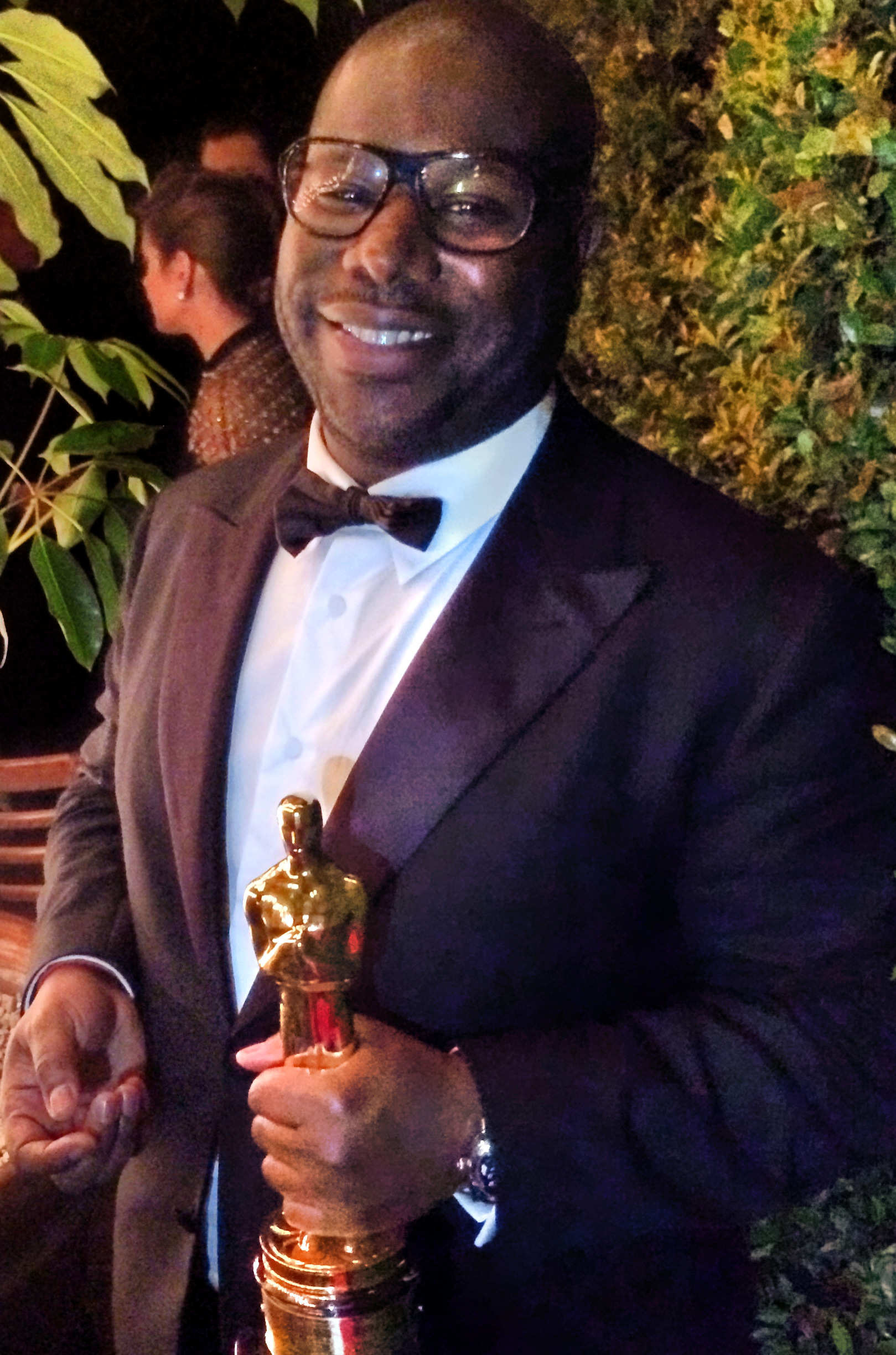
Steve McQueen, Best Director winner

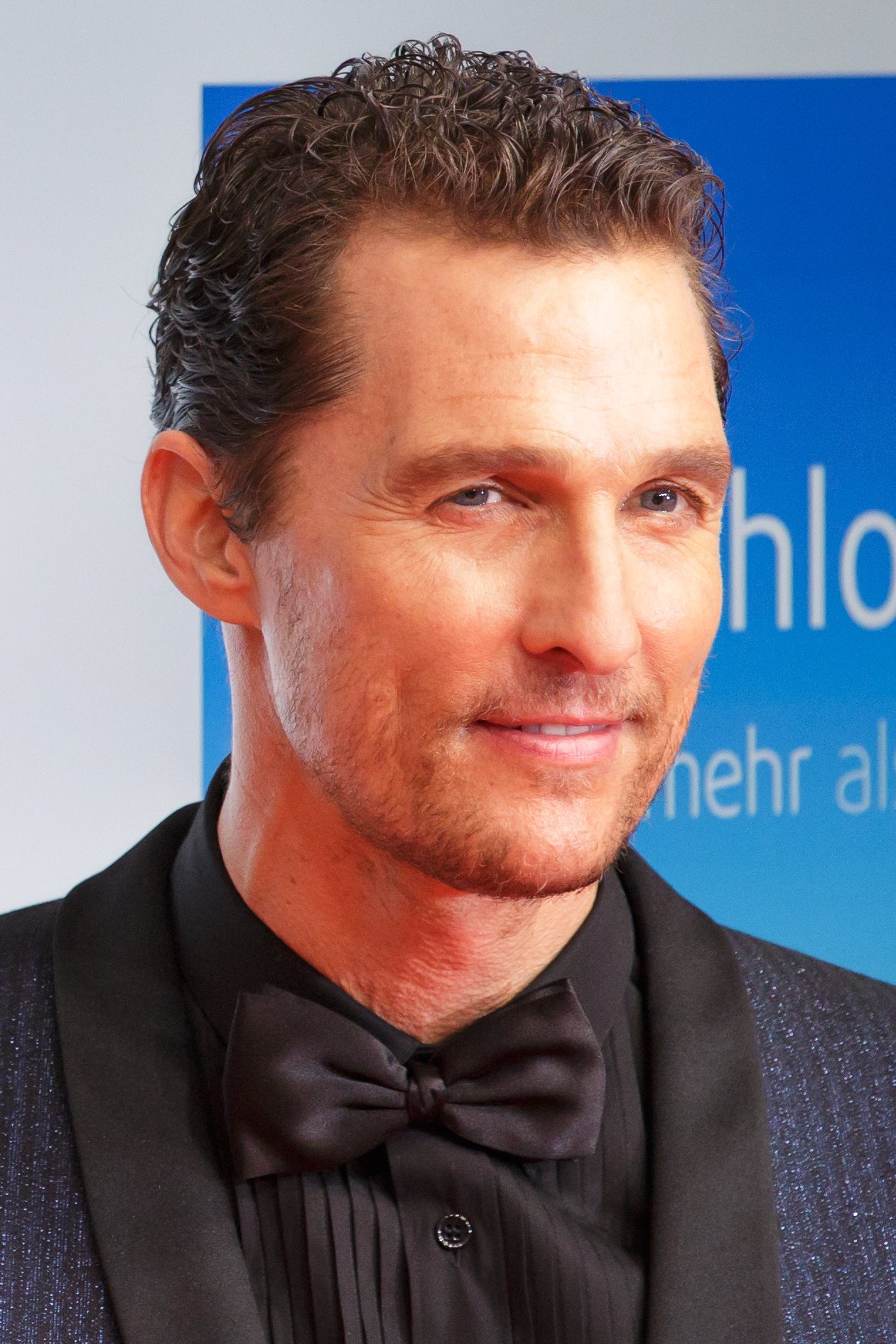
Matthew McConaughey, Best Male Lead winner

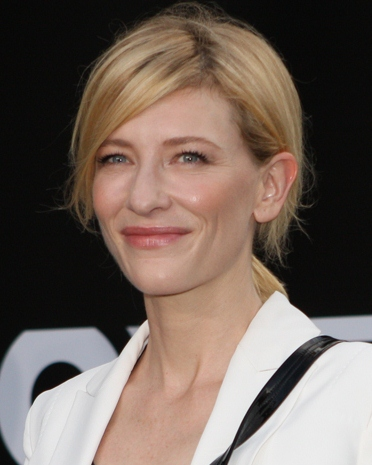
Cate Blanchett, Best Female Lead winner

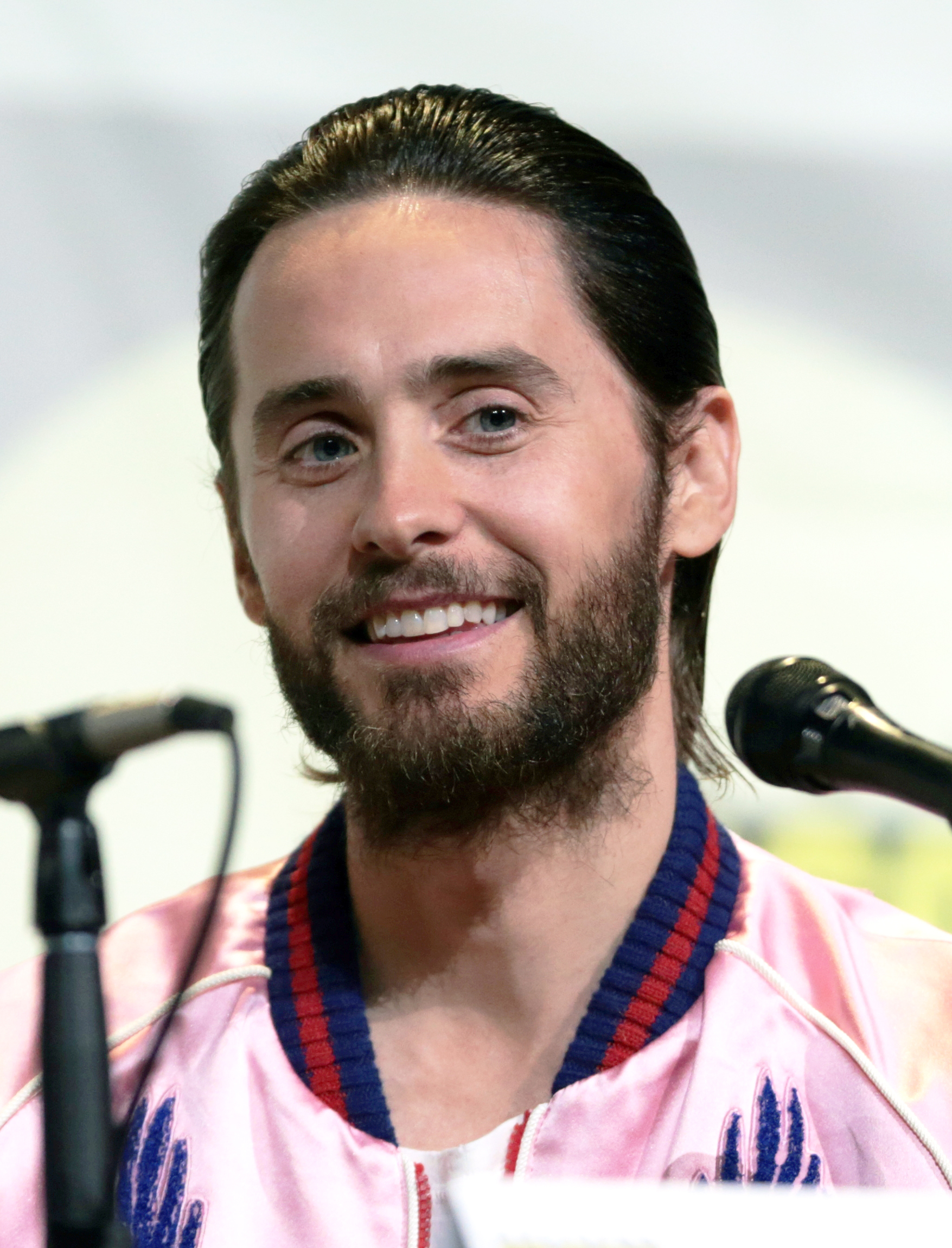
Jared Leto, Best Supporting Male winner

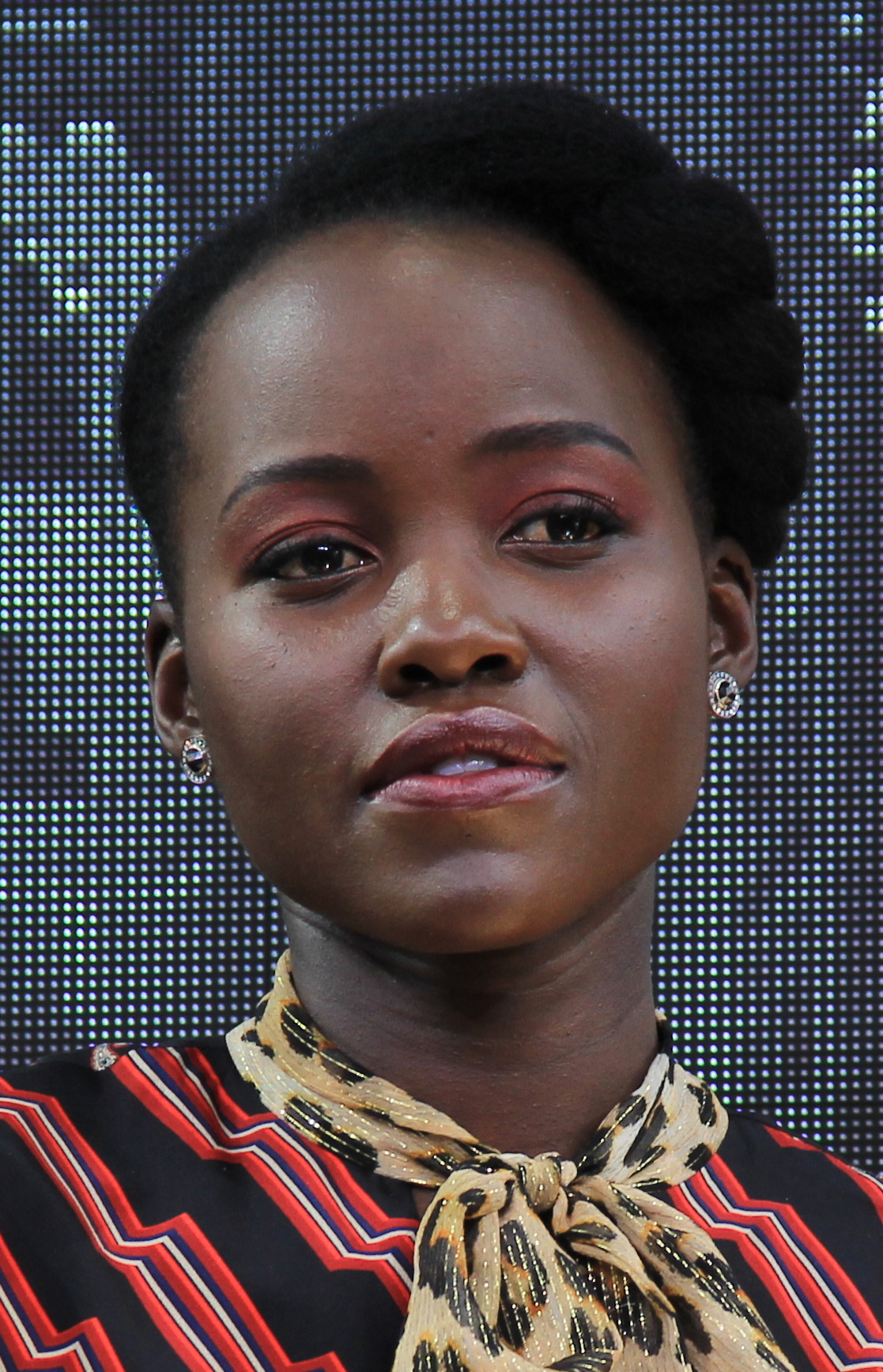
Lupita Nyong'o, Best Supporting Female winner

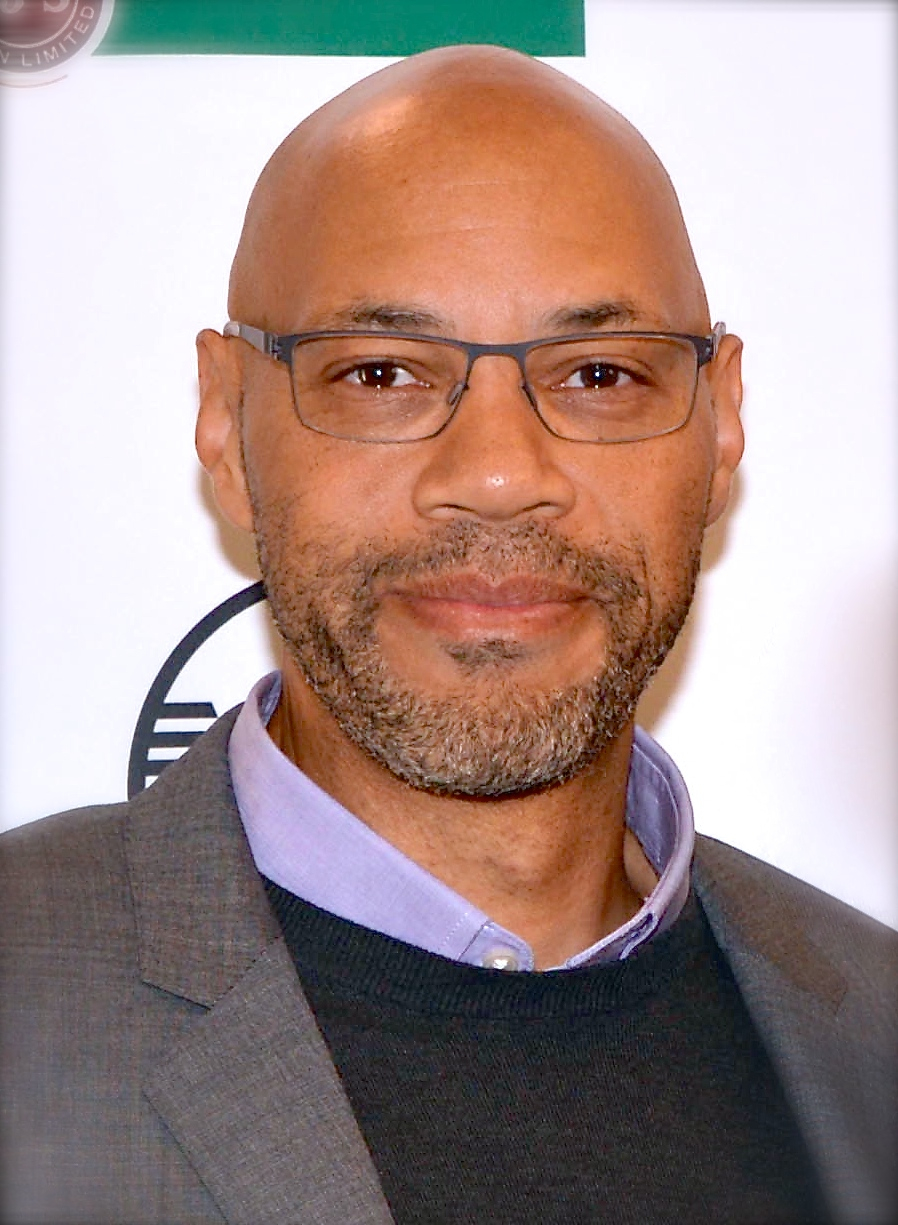
John Ridley, Best Screenplay winner

Best Feature	Best Director
12 Years a Slave: All Is Lost; Frances Ha; Inside Llewyn Davis; Nebraska	Steve McQueen – 12 Years a Slave: Shane Carruth – Upstream Color; J. C. Chandor – All Is Lost; Jeff Nichols – Mud; Alexander Payne – Nebraska
Best Male Lead	Best Female Lead
Matthew McConaughey – Dallas Buyers Club as Ron Woodroof: Bruce Dern – Nebraska as Woodrow "Woody" Grant; Chiwetel Ejiofor – 12 Years a Slave as Solomon Northup; Oscar Isaac – Inside Llewyn Davis as Llewyn Davis; Michael B. Jordan – Fruitvale Station as Oscar Grant III; Robert Redford – All Is Lost as Our Man	Cate Blanchett – Blue Jasmine as Jeanette "Jasmine" Francis: Julie Delpy – Before Midnight as Céline; Gaby Hoffmann – Crystal Fairy as Crystal Fairy; Brie Larson – Short Term 12 as Grace Howard; Shailene Woodley – The Spectacular Now as Aimee Finecky
Best Supporting Male	Best Supporting Female
Jared Leto – Dallas Buyers Club as Rayon: Michael Fassbender – 12 Years a Slave as Edwin Epps; Will Forte – Nebraska as David Grant; James Gandolfini – Enough Said as Albert; Lakeith Stanfield – Short Term 12 as Marcus	Lupita Nyong'o – 12 Years a Slave as Patsey: Melonie Diaz – Fruitvale Station as Sophina Mesa; Sally Hawkins – Blue Jasmine as Ginger; Yolonda Ross – Go for Sisters as Fontayne; June Squibb – Nebraska as Kate Grant
Best Screenplay	Best First Screenplay
John Ridley – 12 Years a Slave: Woody Allen – Blue Jasmine; Julie Delpy, Ethan Hawke, and Richard Linklater – Before Midnight; Nicole Holofcener – Enough Said; Scott Neustadter and Michael H. Weber – The Spectacular Now	Bob Nelson – Nebraska: Lake Bell – In a World...; Joseph Gordon-Levitt – Don Jon; Jill Soloway – Afternoon Delight; Michael Starrbury – The Inevitable Defeat of Mister & Pete
Best First Feature	Best Documentary Feature
Fruitvale Station – Director: Ryan Coogler; Producers: Nina Yang Bongiovi and Forest Whitaker: Blue Caprice – Director/Producer: Alexandre Moors; Producers: Kim Jackson, Brian O'Carroll, Isen Robbins, Will Rowbotham, Aimee Schoof, Ron Simons, and Stephen Tedeschi; Concussion – Director: Stacie Passon; Producer: Rose Troche; Una Noche – Director/Producer: Lucy Mulloy; Producers: Sandy Pérez Aguila, Maite Artieda, Daniel Mulloy, and Yunior Santiago; Wadjda – Director: Haifaa al-Mansour; Producers: Gerhard Meixner and Roman Pau	20 Feet from Stardom – Director/Producer: Morgan Neville; Producers: Gil Friesen and Caitrin Rogers: The Act of Killing – Director/Producer: Joshua Oppenheimer; Producers: Joram Ten Brink, Christine Cynn, Anne Köhncke, Signe Byrge Sørensen, and Michael Uwemedimo; After Tiller – Directors/Producers: Martha Shane and Lana Wilson; Gideon's Army – Director/Producer: Dawn Porter; Producer: Julie Goldman; The Square – Director: Jehane Noujaim; Producer: Karim Amer
Best Cinematography	Best Editing
Sean Bobbitt – 12 Years a Slave: Benoît Debie – Spring Breakers; Bruno Delbonnel – Inside Llewyn Davis; Frank G. DeMarco – All Is Lost; Matthias Grunsky – Computer Chess	Nat Sanders – Short Term 12: Shane Carruth and David Lowery – Upstream Color; Jem Cohen and Marc Vives – Museum Hours; Jennifer Lame – Frances Ha; Cindy Lee – Una Noche
Best International Film
Blue Is the Warmest Colour (France) – Director: Abdellatif Kechiche: Gloria (Chile) – Director: Sebastián Lelio; The Great Beauty (Italy) – Director: Paolo Sorrentino; The Hunt (Denmark) – Director: Thomas Vinterberg; A Touch of Sin (China) – Director: Jia Zhangke

=== Films with multiple nominations and awards ===
Films that received multiple nominations
Nominations	Film
7	12 Years a Slave
6	Nebraska
4	All Is Lost
3	Blue Jasmine
3	Fruitvale Station
3	Inside Llewyn Davis
3	Short Term 12
2	Before Midnight
2	Dallas Buyers Club
2	Enough Said
2	Frances Ha
2	The Spectacular Now
2	Una Noche
2	Upstream Color

Films that won multiple awards
Awards	Film
5	12 Years a Slave
2	Dallas Buyers Club

== Special awards ==
=== John Cassavetes Award ===
This Is Martin Bonner – Writer/Director: Chad Hartigan; Producer: Cherie Saulter

- Computer Chess – Writer/Director: Andrew Bujalski; Producers: Houston King and Alex Lipschultz
- Crystal Fairy – Writer/Director: Sebastián Silva; Producers: Juan de Dios Larraín and Pablo Larraín
- Museum Hours – Writer/Director: Jem Cohen; Producers: Paolo Calamita and Gabriele Kranzelbinder
- Pit Stop – Writer/Director: Yen Tan; Writer: David Lowery; Producers: Jonathan Duffy, James M. Johnston, Eric Steele, and Kelly Williams

=== Truer Than Fiction Award ===
Jason Osder – Let the Fire Burn

- Kalyanee Mam – A River Changes Course
- Stephanie Spray and Pacho Velez – Manakamana

=== Piaget Producers Award ===
Toby Halbrooks and James M. Johnston

- Jacob Jaffke
- Andrea Roa
- Frederick Thornton

=== Someone to Watch Award ===
Newlyweeds – Director: Shaka King

- The Foxy Merkins – Director: Madeleine Olnek
- My Sister's Quinceañera – Director: Aaron Douglas Johnston

=== Robert Altman Award ===
(The award is given to its film director, casting director, and ensemble cast)

- Mud – Jeff Nichols, Francine Maisler, Joe Don Baker, Jacob Lofland, Matthew McConaughey, Ray McKinnon, Sarah Paulson, Michael Shannon, Sam Shepard, Tye Sheridan, Paul Sparks, Bonnie Sturdivant, and Reese Witherspoon

=== Bright Future Award ===
Patrick Creadon – If You Build It
