= Meet Me in the Bathroom =

Meet Me in the Bathroom may refer to:

- Meet Me in the Bathroom (book), a 2017 history of the New York rock scene by Lizzy Goodman
- Meet Me in the Bathroom (film), a 2022 documentary adapted from the book
- "Meet Me in the Bathroom", a song by The Strokes from their 2003 album Room on Fire
