= 2012 Deauville American Film Festival =

2012 film festival edition

- Festival poster
- Opening film: Mud
- Closing film: Savages
- Location: Deauville, France
- Hosted by: Deauville American Film Festival Group
- No. of films: 67 feature films
- Festival date: August 31, 2012–September 9, 2012
- Language: International
- Website: www.festival-deauville.com

The 38th Deauville American Film Festival took place at Deauville, France from August 31 to September 9, 2012. Jeff Nichols's drama film Mud served as the opening night film. Savages by Oliver Stone was the closing night film of the festival. The Grand Prix was awarded to Beasts of the Southern Wild by Benh Zeitlin.

Complete lineup for the festival was announced on July 25, 2012, including episodes from Television shows for the Television section at the festival. Fashion designer and filmmaker Agnès B. was given Carte blanche section to show seven of her favourite American films to the festival audience. The festival paid tribute to William Friedkin, Salma Hayek, Harvey Keitel, Liam Neeson, Melvin Van Peebles, Paula Wagner and John Williams and hosted retrospective of their films. Paul Dano received Le Nouvel Hollywood (Hollywood Rising Star) award.

== Juries ==
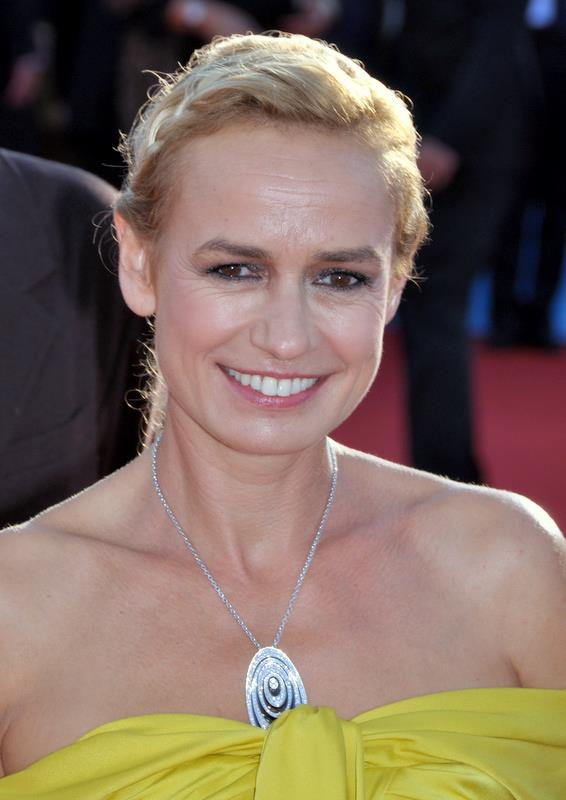
Sandrine Bonnaire, Main Jury President

=== Main Competition ===
- Sandrine Bonnaire: French actress, film director and screenwriter (President of Jury)
- Clotilde Courau: French actress and Princess of Venice and Piedmont
- Sami Bouajila: French-Tunisian actor
- Christophe Honoré: French writer and film director
- Anaïs Demoustier: French actress
- Alice Taglioni: French actress
- Philippe Decouflé: French choreographer, dancer, mime artist, and theatre director
- Joann Sfar: French comics artist, comic book creator, novelist, and film director
- Florent Emilio Siri: French video game and film director and screenwriter

=== Cartier revelation jury ===
- Frédéric Beigbeder: French writer, literary critic and a TV presenter (President of Jury)
- Àstrid Bergès-Frisbey: French-Spanish actress and model
- Mélanie Bernier: French actress
- Ana Girardot: French actress
- Félix Moati: French actor

== Programme ==
=== Competition ===
- Beasts of the Southern Wild by Benh Zeitlin
- Booster by Matt Ruskin
- California Solo by Marshall Lewy
- Compliance by Craig Zobel
- Electrick Children by Rebecca Thomas
- For Ellen by So Yong Kim
- Francine by Melanie Shatzky and Brian M. Cassidy
- Gimme the Loot by Adam Leon
- God Bless America by Bobcat Goldthwait
- Robot & Frank by Jake Schreier
- Smashed by James Ponsoldt
- The We and the I by Michel Gondry
- Una Noche by Lucy Mulloy
- Wrong by Quentin Dupieux
- Your Sister's Sister by Lynn Shelton

=== Les Premières (Premieres) ===
- Bachelorette by Leslye Headland
- Blackbird by Jason Buxton
- Killer Joe by William Friedkin
- Lawless by John Hillcoat
- Ruby Sparks by Jonathan Dayton and Valerie Faris
- Savages by Oliver Stone
- Secret of the Wings by Peggy Holmes and Roberts Gannaway
- Take This Waltz by Sarah Polley
- Taken 2 by Olivier Megaton
- Ted by Seth MacFarlane
- The Bourne Legacy by Tony Gilroy
- The Tall Man by Pascal Laugier

=== Les Docs De L'Oncle Sam (Uncle Sam's Doc) ===
- Diana Vreeland: The Eye Has to Travel by Lisa Immordino Vreeland, Frédéric Tcheng and Bent-Jorgen Perlmutt
- Ethel by Rory Kennedy
- Tomi Ungerer - l'esprit frappeur by Brad Bernstein
- Gazzara by Joseph Rezwin
- Into the Abyss by Werner Herzog
- Method to the Madness of Jerry Lewis by Gregg Barson
- Room 237 by Rodney Ascher
- Searching for Sugar Man by Malik Bendjelloul
- The Imposter by Bart Layton
- The Queen of Versailles by Lauren Greenfield
- West of Memphis by Amy J. Berg

=== La Nuit américaine (American cinema overview) ===
- Bad Lieutenant by Abel Ferrara
- Bandidas by Joachim Rønning
- Bug by William Friedkin
- Cinq cent balles by Melvin Van Peebles
- Cruising by William Friedkin
- Desperado by Robert Rodriguez
- La Fête à Harlem by Melvin Van Peebles
- Lonely Hearts by Todd Robinson
- Love Actually by Richard Curtis
- Mean Streets by Martin Scorsese
- Michael Collins by Neil Jordan
- Mission: Impossible by Brian De Palma
- Schindler's List by Steven Spielberg
- Sweet Sweetback's Baadasssss Song by Melvin Van Peebles
- The Exorcist by William Friedkin
- The French Connection by William Friedkin
- The Last Samurai by Edward Zwick
- To Live and Die in LA by William Friedkin
- Vanilla Sky by Cameron Crowe
- War of the Worlds by Steven Spielberg

=== Carte blanche ===
- Freaks by Tod Browning
- Lost Highway by David Lynch
- Reflections in a Golden Eye by John Huston
- Reservoir Dogs by Quentin Tarantino
- Seven Chances by Buster Keaton
- The Big Shave by Martin Scorsese
- Trash Humpers by Harmony Korine

=== Séance culte ===
- Westworld by Michael Crichton

=== Television ===
- Girls by Lena Dunham
- Homeland by Howard Gordon and Alex Gansa
- The Newsroom by Aaron Sorkin
- Shameless by Paul Abbott

== Awards ==
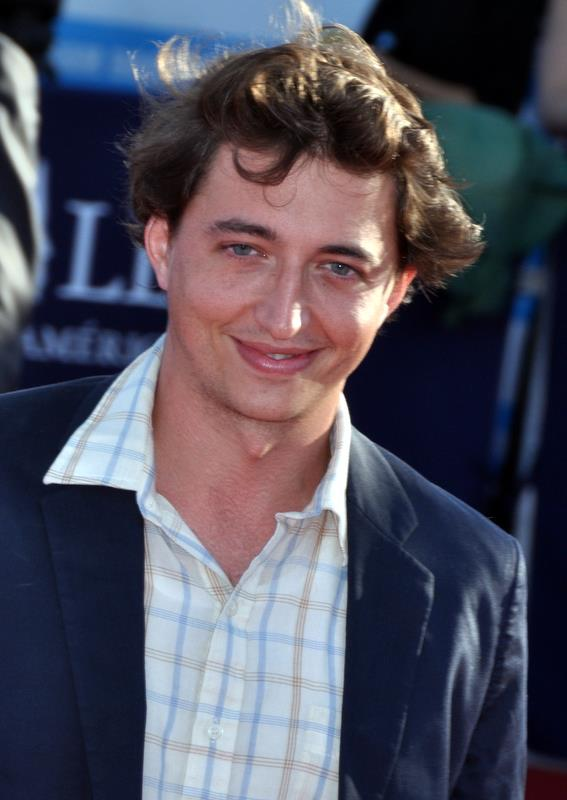
Benh Zeitlin, won Grand Prix and Cartier Revelation Prize at the festival.

The festival awarded the following awards:

- Grand Prix (Grand Special Prize): Beasts of the Southern Wild by Benh Zeitlin
- Prix du Jury (Jury Special Prize): Una Noche by Lucy Mulloy
- Prix de la Critique Internationale (International Critics' prize): The We and the I by Michel Gondry
- Prix Michel d'Ornano (Michel d'Ornano Award for debut French film): Hold Back by Rachid Djaïdani
- Prix de la Révélation Cartier (Cartier Revelation Prize): Beasts of the Southern Wild by Benh Zeitlin
- Lucien Barrière Prize for Literature:
  - I Am Not Sidney Poitier by Percival Everett
- Tributes:
  - William Friedkin
  - Salma Hayek
  - Harvey Keitel
  - Liam Neeson
  - Melvin Van Peebles
  - Paula Wagner
  - John Williams
- Le Nouvel Hollywood (Hollywood Rising Star):
  - Paul Dano
