= Aaron Johnston =

Aaron Johnston may refer to:

- Aaron Johnston (writer), American author, comics writer, and film producer
- Aaron Johnston (basketball) (born 1974), American basketball coach
- Aaron Johnston (co-driver) (born 1995), Irish rallying co-driver
- Aaron Douglas Johnston, American filmmaker

== See also ==
- Aaron Johnson (disambiguation)
