= Una Noche (disambiguation) =

Una Noche is a 2012 Cuban-set drama-thriller film.

Una Noche may also refer to:

- Una Noche, a 2002 album by La Secta AllStar
- "Give Me Just One Night (Una Noche)", a song by 98 Degrees
