= Toilet (disambiguation) =

A toilet is a sanitation fixture used primarily for the disposal of human excrement and urine.

Toilet may also refer to:

- Toilet (room), a room that contains a toilet and sometimes a sink

== See also ==
- Personal grooming, also known as "performing one's toilette"
  - Toilet service a luxurious set of boxes, brushes and the like for use at the dressing-table
  - Toilet water, a sort of perfume
  - Toiletries, consumable items of personal grooming, e.g. shampoo
  - Toilet table, a name for the dressing table
- Wound toilet, the practice of cleansing a wound before applying a dressing
- Toileting, the act of assisting a dependent patient with his or her elimination needs
- Toilet circuit, a network of small music venues in the UK which are frequently played by rising bands before they achieve mainstream fame
- Toilet (film), a 2010 Japanese film
- Toilet, an album by Clown Core
- Toilet: Ek Prem Katha (Toilet: A Love Story), a 2017 Indian film
- New Jersey (New Jersey), a state sometimes nicknamed "the toilet bowl" due to the smell and congestion.
