= Oasis: Don't Look Back in Anger =

2026 documentary by Will Lovelace and Dylan Southern

- Theatrical release poster
- Directed by: Will Lovelace; Dylan Southern
- Written by: Steven Knight
- Produced by: Sam Bridger; Guy Heeley; Steven Knight; Tom Mackay
- Starring: Liam Gallagher; Noel Gallagher
- Cinematography: Haris Zambarloukos
- Edited by: George Cragg; Martina Zamolo
- Production companies: Magna Studios; Sony Music Vision; Sony Music Entertainment UK
- Distributed by: Walt Disney Studios Motion Pictures
- Release dates: 5 September 2026 (Venice); 11 September 2026
- Running time: 123 minutes
- Countries: United Kingdom; United States
- Language: English
- Box office: $12.5 million

Oasis: Don't Look Back in Anger is a 2026 documentary film directed by Will Lovelace and Dylan Southern, and written by Steven Knight. It follows the 2025 reunion tour of English rock band Oasis. Alongside rehearsal, backstage and onstage footage, it features the first joint interview of Liam and Noel Gallagher after more than 15 years of estrangement.

The film had its world premiere out of competition at the 83rd Venice International Film Festival on 5 September 2026.

== Overview ==
The documentary follows the story of Oasis, from the band's rise to fame during the 1990s Britpop movement to its eventual split. Particular attention is given to the often turbulent relationship between Liam and Noel Gallagher, whose public disagreements became closely associated with the band's history.

The film also focuses on the band's reunion for the Oasis Live '25 tour, documenting the preparations and performances surrounding their return to the stage. Through footage and interviews, it explores the significance of the reunion for the band members and their fans.

== Production ==
The film has been written by Peaky Blinders creator Steven Knight, and directed by Dylan Southern and Will Lovelace, the English filmmaking duo behind Shut Up and Play the Hits and Meet Me in the Bathroom. It is produced by Magna Studios and presented by Sony Music Vision.

== Release ==
It was released by Walt Disney Studios Motion Pictures in select IMAX and cinemas on 9 September 2026 before streaming on 9 October 2026 on Disney+ internationally, and on Hulu and Disney+ in the United States.

== Reception ==
=== Box office ===
As of 4 October 2026, the film grossed $12,485,044 worldwide.

=== Critical response ===
On the review aggregator website Rotten Tomatoes, 97% of 73 critics' reviews are positive, with an average rating of 7.9/10. The website's consensus reads: "Marking a happy ending to Oasis' turbulent journey, Don't Look Back in Anger is a joyous celebration of burying the hatchet and letting the music shine like a supernova." Metacritic, which uses a weighted average, assigned the film a score of 81 out of 100, based on 23 critics, indicating "universal acclaim".

Peter Bradshaw of The Guardian gave the film four out of five stars, writing that it's "highly enjoyable" and that it "recollects how effortlessly funny the Gallagher brothers are, like a great comic double act." Richard Lawson of The Hollywood Reporter wrote, "Those hoping for some inside dirt on the Gallaghers' famous feud, or about the mechanics that brought them back together after a 15-year estrangement, will not be satisfied. This is a nice, celebratory, water-under-the-bridge movie; there's to be no personal nor political interrogation." Marshall Shaffer of IndieWire gave the film a B and wrote that the directors "got to capture a genuine rarity in an age of tribalism and polarization. Two estranged parties with seemingly irreconcilable differences managed to come together, put the past behind them, and chart a path toward a kinder future."
