= Megane (film) =

- Promotional release poster
- Directed by: Naoko Ogigami
- Written by: Naoko Ogigami
- Produced by: Shuichi Komuro; Enma Maekawa; Hanako Kasumisawa; Seiji Okuda; Kumi Kobata
- Starring: Satomi Kobayashi; Mikako Ichikawa; Ryo Kase; Ken Mitsuishi; Masako Motai; Hiroko Yakushimaru
- Cinematography: Minebobu Tani
- Music by: Takahiro Kaneko
- Distributed by: Nikkatsu
- Release date: 22 September 2007 (Japan)
- Running time: 106 minutes
- Country: Japan
- Language: Japanese

Megane (Japanese: めがね; "Glasses") is a 2007 Japanese comedy film written and directed by Naoko Ogigami. Set on an unnamed Japanese island, the film tells the story of a vacationing university professor who comes in contact with several eccentric local inhabitants. It serves as a follow-up to Ogigami's 2006 film Kamome Shokudo, and features two of the same actors. It was featured at several film festivals including the Sundance Film Festival. During production, Ogigami decided the title of the movie after an impromptu realization that all of the characters in the film wore glasses.

== Plot ==
Megane tells the story of Taeko, an antisocial city woman, vacationing on a quaint Japanese island (later identified by the director as Yoron Island, Kagoshima). Upon arriving at the Hamada Inn, she meets some inhabitants of the island: Sakura, a mysterious older woman who runs a shaved ice stand on the island during the spring season, but accepts no money; Haruna, a biology teacher who sighs about the lack of cute boys in her class and is often late for it; and Yuji the innkeeper who is friendly but says he does not want many guests and there is nothing worth seeing locally.

On the first morning of her vacation Taeko is woken by a kneeling Sakura, who greets her with a cheerful Ohayo gozaimasu (good morning) and invites her to join in morning aerobics. Taeko declines but later wanders down to the beach to watch children performing what Yuji calls their "merci" exercises, a light aerobics program invented by Sakura. Taeko's fish-out-of-water feelings are only accentuated when Yuji attempts to explain "twilighting" to her, a local pastime consisting of thinking while staring off into the sunset.

Taeko generally refuses invitations to share meals and activities and prefers to read and crochet alone. After a few days, she becomes fed up with the quirkiness of the inn's residents and checks instead into the Marine Palace, the island's other hotel. However, she rapidly realizes that it is a hostel with a programme of agricultural labour and study and immediately leaves. Lost while trying to return to the Inn, she is found by Sakura on a tricycle. Back at the Inn, she is joined by a former student, Yomogi, and slowly learns to accept and then love the inn's relaxed and communal way of life.

== Cast ==
- Satomi Kobayashi as Taeko
- Masako Motai as Sakura
- Mikako Ichikawa as Haruna
- Ken Mitsuishi as Yuji
- Ryo Kase as Yomogi

== Themes ==
A major theme of the movie is the importance of taking one's time and appreciating life, contrasted to Taeko's normal urban lifestyle and mindset. Many scenes of the movie quietly depict simple moments of life like eating, watching the ocean, or playing a mandolin. Henry Stewart of The L Magazine described Megane as "an ode to the pleasures of unhurried living." Another critic said of the film, "On this paradisical island little else matters beyond the recharging of spiritual batteries and the enjoyment of eating." Sakura is the epitome of this ideal – waiting intently in front of a cooking bean pot in order to turn off the heat at exactly the right moment or painstakingly preparing her special shaved ice.

The film's plot is purposely slow-paced, a fact which Ogigami acknowledged at the San Francisco festival screening when she issued a sleep warning to the audience, all the while implying that such an act was in accordance with the spirit of the movie.

== Reception ==
The film was featured at the 2008 Sundance Film Festival, where it was nominated for the Grand Jury Prize, and San Francisco International Film Festival. The International Federation of Film Critics awarded Megane with a Special Jury Mention in 2008, "[f]or the freshness and optimism of the comedy, that glides along at an unexpectedly serene pace." At the Berlin International Film Festival Megane won the Manfred Salzberger Award for "broadening the boundaries of cinema today." The film was also shown at the 2010 Nippon Connection film festival in Frankfurt, Germany and the 2011 Japanese Film Festival in Singapore.

Reviews were mixed. John Anderson of Variety Magazine called the film "a vaguely magical, insistently modern fable that could become an arthouse hit", praising the film's acting, production values, and "extraordinarily confident direction." One professor of Japanese cinema called it "the perfect antidote to the trite 3D fare Hollywood's been throwing at us of late." However, not all reviews were so high-minded. The film received a 40 percent rating on Rotten Tomatoes. Nick Shager of Slant Magazine gave the movie one star out of four, calling it pretentious and "just about insufferable," and David Fear of Time Out called it "the cinematic equivalent of a rock-garden tchotchke sold as exotica to tourists."

Megane has also achieved the status of art film and has been featured in various museum presentations, including at the Japanese cultural House in Paris (French: Maison de la culture du Japon à Paris) and the Museum of Modern Art in New York.
