= Gazzara =

Gazzara may refer to:

- Gazzara (2012 film), 2012 film about Ben Gazzara
- Gazzara (surname), Italian surname

== See also ==
- Gazzera
