= Una noche (disambiguation) =

Una noche (One Night) is a 2012 American film set in Cuba.

Una noche may also refer to:

- "Una Noche" (The Corrs song) on 2000 album In Blue
- "Una Noche (Get Up)", 2002 song by Pnau with Kid Creole and the Coconuts
