= Close-Knit =

2017 film

- Film poster
- Directed by: Naoko Ogigami
- Written by: Naoko Ogigami
- Starring: Toma Ikuta; Kenta Kiritani; Rinka Kakihara; Rie Mimura; Eiko Koike; Mugi Kadowaki; Shūji Kashiwabara
- Cinematography: Kōzō Shibasaki
- Edited by: Shin'ichi Fushima
- Music by: Yoshihide Ōtomo
- Distributed by: Suurkiitos
- Release dates: 10 February 2017 (Berlin); 25 February 2017 (Japan)
- Running time: 127 minutes
- Country: Japan
- Language: Japanese

Close-Knit (Japanese: 彼らが本気で編むときは、, Hepburn: Karera ga Honki de Amu Toki wa,) is a 2017 Japanese drama film directed by Naoko Ogigami. Ogigami wrote the script after a visit to the United States caused her to become more aware of LGBT issues. The film follows Tomo Ogawa, an 11-year-old girl, who becomes close to her uncle's transgender girlfriend after Tomo's mother, who has been raising her alone, unexpectedly runs off and leaves Tomo behind. It was screened in the Panorama section at the 67th Berlin International Film Festival.

== Plot ==
Tomo Ogawa is a neglected 11-year-old girl. She lives with her single and irresponsible mother in a small apartment, who abandons her when she falls in love with a new man. Whenever that happens, Tomo goes to live with her uncle, Makio. However, this time around, Makio is cohabitating with his girlfriend, Rinko, who is a transgender woman. The film portrays the drama that unfolds in an unconventional family and Tomo's acceptance of LGBT people.

== Cast ==
- Toma Ikuta as Rinko
- Kenta Kiritani as Makio Ogawa
- Rinka Kakihara as Tomo Ogawa
- Rie Mimura as Hiromi Ogawa
- Eiko Koike as Naomi
- Mugi Kadowaki as Yuka
- Shuji Kashiwabara as Yoshio
- Kaito Komie as Kai
- Lily as Sayuri Ogawa
- Misako Tanaka as Fumiko
- Noriko Eguchi as Kanai
- Tōru Shinagawa as Saito

== See also ==
- List of LGBT-related films directed by women
