= Markku Peltola =

Finnish actor and musician (1956–2007)

- Peltola in The Man Without a Past.
- Born: 12 July 1956; Helsinki, Finland
- Died: 31 December 2007 (aged 51); Kangasala, Finland
- Years active: 1980 – 2007

Markku Peltola (12 July 1956 – 31 December 2007) was a Finnish actor and musician. He was born and grew up in Helsinki. He was actively involved in founding and acting with the Telakka Theater in Tampere.

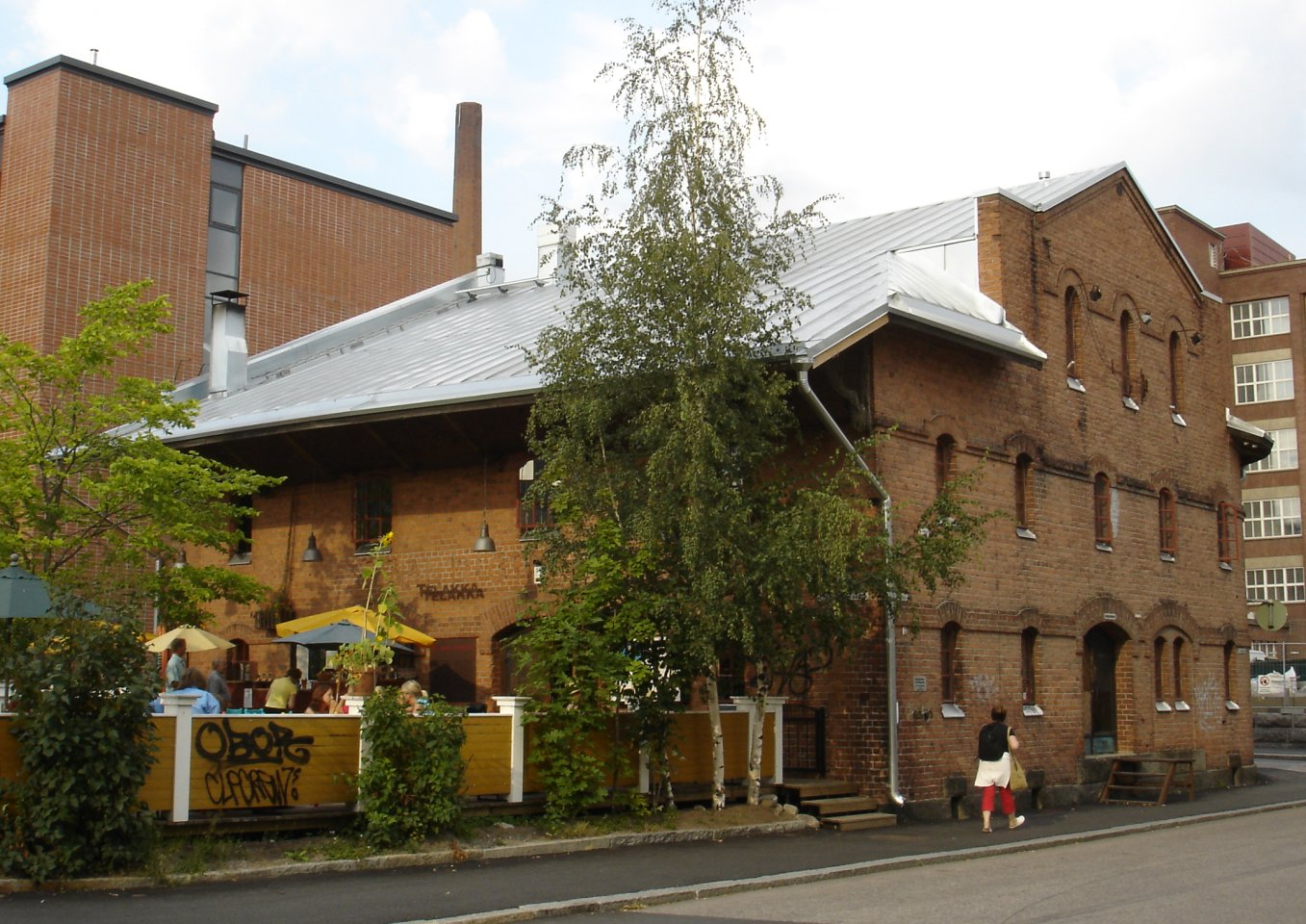
Telakka Theatre, Tampere, of which Peltola was a founding member

Peltola is best known for starring opposite Kati Outinen in Aki Kaurismäki's Academy Award-nominated film from 2002 The Man Without a Past. Other films that Peltola featured in include V2 – jäätynyt enkeli, Young Gods, Drifting Clouds, Kamome Shokudo, Jade Warrior and Perhoshäkki.

From the 1980s until his death, Peltola was the singer and bass guitarist of the Finnish band Motelli Skronkle. He also released two solo albums: Buster Keatonin ratsutilalla, released by Ektro Records in 2003 and Buster Keaton tarkistaa idän ja lännen at the beginning of 2006.

Peltola died in the early hours of 31 December 2007 at his home in Kangasala, Finland.

== Filmography ==
Year	Title	Role	Notes
1980	Espanjankävijät	Sulo Paaso	
1981	Valehtelija		
1982	The Archer	Akin olinpaikan kertova nuori	Uncredited
1992	Tuhlaajapoika	Makkonen	
1992	Papukaijamies	Kummajainen	
1993	Harjunpää ja kiusantekijät	Risto Kullervo Kilpua, peeper 'Lasinaama'	
1994	Take Care of Your Scarf, Tatiana		
1996	Drifting Clouds	Lajunen	
1996	Merisairas	Pony-tailed sailor	
1997	Mustasilmä-Susanna ja lepakkoluolan aarre	Max	
1998	Armon aika	Mies torilla	
1999	Juha	Autonkuljettaja	
1999	Sen täytyy tapahtua	Luke	
2002	The Man Without a Past	M	
2002	Ten Minutes Older: The Trumpet		(segment "Dogs Have No Hell")
2003	Kohtalon kirja	Tiedemies	
2003	Hymypoika	Samin isä	
2004	Lasileuka	Mies ravintolassa	Short
2004	Vares: Private Eye	Luusalmi	
2005	Eläville ja kuolleille	Principal of Music School	
2005	Lupaus	Matti	
2006	Kamome Shokudo	Matti	
2006	Jade Warrior	Berg	
2007	V2 – jäätynyt enkeli	Luusalmi	
2007	Riivaaja		Short
2008	Mina olin siin. Esimene arest		
2013	Kalervo Palsa ja kuriton käsi	Isä / Intiaanipäällikkö / Kreivi Buharin	(final film role)
