= Gazzera =

Gazzera is an Italian surname. Notable people with the surname include:

- Fritz Gazzera (1907–1996), German fencer
- Linda Gazzera (1890–1942), Italian spiritualist medium
- Pietro Gazzera (1879–1953), Italian officer in the Italian Royal Army and politician

== See also ==
- Gazzara (disambiguation)
- Gazzara (surname)
