= Aaron Johnson =

Aaron Johnson may refer to:

- Aaron Johnson (ice hockey) (born 1983), Canadian ice hockey player
- Aaron Johnson (basketball) (born 1988), American basketball player
- Aaron Krister Johnson, American composer, musician and teacher
- Aaron Taylor-Johnson (born 1990), English actor, formerly Aaron Johnson
- Aaron M. Johnson (born 1991), American jazz saxophonist and bandleader
- Aaron Johnson (cricketer) (born 1991), Jamaican-born Canadian cricketer

== See also ==
- Aaron Johnston (disambiguation)
