= Naoko Ogigami =

Japanese film director

- 荻上 直子
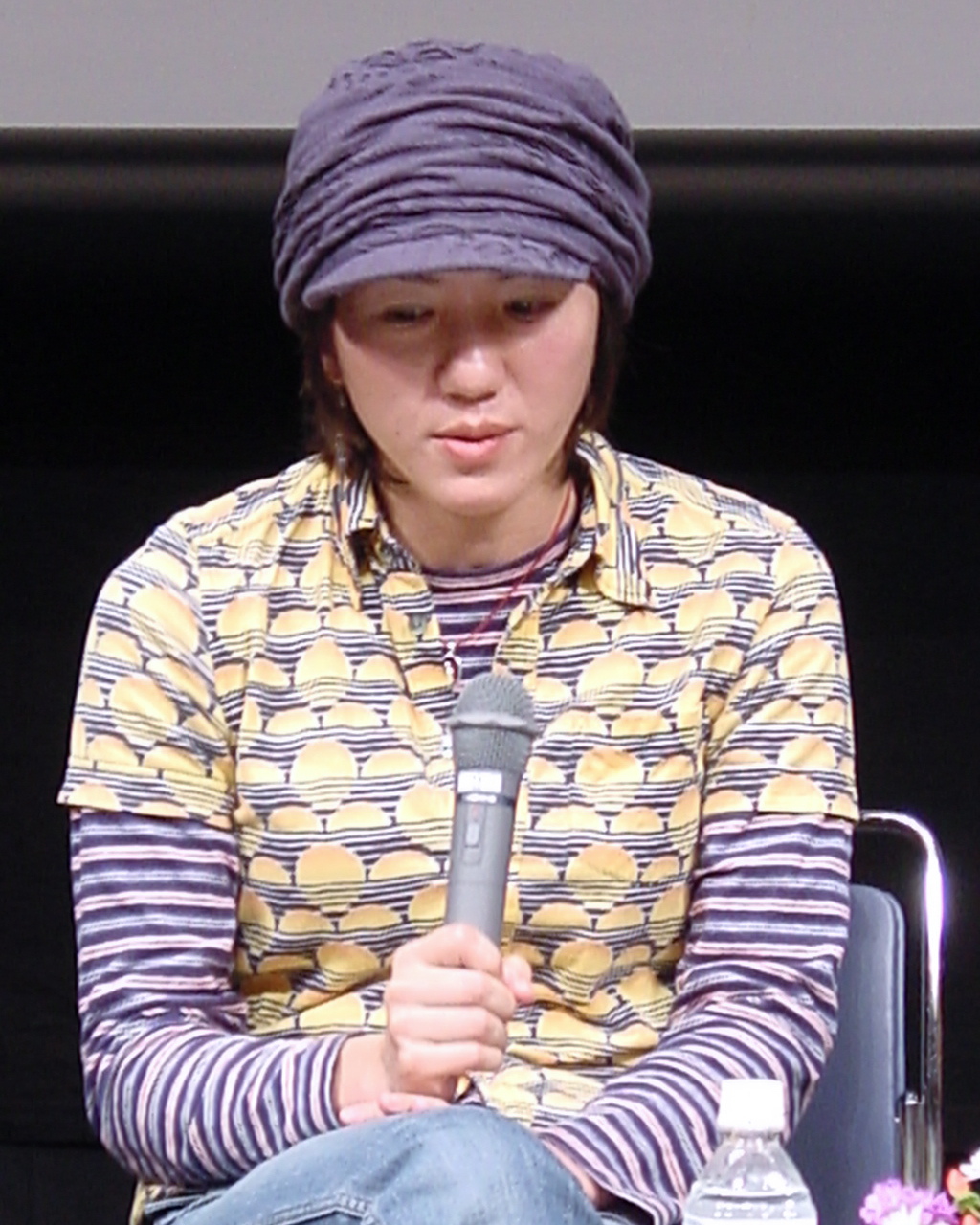
- Naoko Ogigami at the 15th Annual Tama Cinema Forum in 2005.
- Born: February 15, 1972 (age 54); Chiba Prefecture, Japan
- Occupations: Director, screenwriter, cinematographer
- Years active: 1999–present

Naoko Ogigami (荻上 直子, Ogigami Naoko; born 1972 in Chiba Prefecture) is a Japanese film director, screenwriter, and cinematographer. She first began gaining attention after winning several prizes at the PIA Film Festival for her short film Hoshino-Kun, Yumeno-Kun (2001). Among her most notable works are her films Kamome Shokudo and Megane. Her filmography is typified by their minimalistic quality and a common theme of questioning national identity. At the 2008 Berlin International Film Festival Megane won the Manfred Salzgeber Award, for "broadening the boundaries of cinema today."

== Early life and education ==
Ogigami attended Chiba University's Image Science program with an initial interest in photography and learning the science of creating images. Eventually deciding against pursuing photography, Ogigami then turned to studying film due to her fascination with moving images. After graduating in 1994, she moved to the United States to study film at the University of Southern California. There she studied for six years, learning English and completing a graduate degree in film production. Upon returning to Japan in 2000, she initially struggled to find a job and reacclimate herself back into Japanese society before she began writing and directing films.

== Career ==
While living in the United States, Ogigami worked on several short films, television shows, and commercials as a cinematographer, camera operator, and production assistant. She also wrote and directed two short films, Ayako (1999) and Hoshino-kun, Yumino-kun (2001). Yumino-kun won 3 different awards at the PIA Film Festival the year it premiered. Her first feature film, Yoshino's Barber Shop premiered at the PIA Film Festival in and the Berlin International Film Festival in 2004, winning awards at both. Her next feature film, Love is Five, Seven, Five! was released a year later in 2005. In 2006 her third film Kamome Diner was given a limited release in Japan. It would later go on to tour a number of festivals, and was awarded the 5th Best Film at the Yokohama Film Festival in 2007.

In 2008 Glasses, her fourth film, was featured at the Berlin International Film Festival, Sundance Film Festival, and San Francisco International Film Festival, though it first premiered a year earlier. At the Berlin International Film Festival, Glasses was nominated for and won the Manfred Salzgeber Award for "broadening the boundaries of cinema today." The film was also nominated for the Grand Jury Prize for Dramatic World Cinema, though it lost to Jens Jonssen's The King of Ping Pong.

In 2008, she also helped found the production company Suurkiitos, which is the Finnish word for "thank you very much." The company handles advertising, actor management, and film distribution. Her two subsequent films were distributed through the company. After a break in writing and directing, her next film Toilet was given limited theatrical release in Japan and South Korea in 2010, and went on to tour the festival circuit, being shown in festivals in Canada, the United States, Japan, and Taiwan. Her film Rent-a-Cat premiered in 2012 at the Stockholm International Film Festival, and was later nominated for Best Feature at Oslo Films From The South Festival.

In 2017, Ogigami released her film Close-Knit, which garnered great success overseas. The film was selected for the Panorama section at the 67th Annual Berlin International Film Festival, which specifically features queer cinema, and won the Panorama Audience Award. The film was also presented with the Teddy Award, given to films which center LGBT topics, becoming the first Japanese film to be granted this title.

== Style and influences ==
Thematically, all of Ogigami's films are similar in nature, a recurring theme being culture clash; a foreigner comes to a new place and is faced with unfamiliar practices and elements. The incorporation of this theme amongst her films reflects her own experience of traveling and residing both in the United States and Japan. Most of her works place Japanese characters and elements of Japan culture in these foreign settings; this is true of Kamome Diner, Megane, and Toilet. The films then depict how they deal with this clash. In doing so, Ogigami often constructs a critique which "put[s] nationhood under a microscope, to satirise the notion that any particular country can be summarised, visualised, and indeed understood through reference to any single aspect of its culture [or] society."

Ogigami has written and directed all of her films, which have been classified as "iyashi-kei eiga," or, "films that provide emotional healing." Her style has been described as "minimalist, wryly humorous, languorous, naturalistic, [and] ostensibly undramatic." Ogigami's films are lighter in nature than most Japanese cinema. Her films tackle larger, complex ideas of nationhood and identity, yet in a calm, peaceful environment decorated by carefully constructed and detailed shots. Her style of creating 'slice of life' stories which pay careful attention to character development and setting has been compared to the works of famous Japanese filmmaker Yasujiro Ozu, along with her camerawork which is characterized by "the illusion of flat space derived from bright lighting and defined colors; deep-focus long shots; carefully-centered subjects; attention to negative space; and frame-by-frame composition." Ogigami's tendency to "borrow from a multitude of national film histories, invest in a personal and signature aesthetic style, craft distinctive characters, re-use actors... and afford a great deal of attention to detailed environments" has also been compared to American filmmaker Wes Anderson. Identifiable in her works is an influence of American independent cinema, deep-focus cinematography, a repeated appearance of actress Masako Motai, and frequent detailed shots of food. Her attention to food across her works is a meaningful choice; Ogigami elaborates in an interview that "I wanted to express that the time of eating together is such a happy moment... But I also intend to express that this happy moment will not last forever – that it is completely futile. Also, making food is usually very time-consuming, but then it is eaten in just a few minutes."

== Film reception ==
Ogigami's films have increasingly gained critical attention both domestically and overseas after their success at multiple film festivals both in Japan and abroad. When asked about one of the practices characters participate in with Glasses, she commented, "Somehow Glasses went to lots of film festivals. And especially European and American people think that twilighting means something about Zen spirit, like in Buddhism. But I always answered that maybe this is just because I grew up in Japan and I have those kind of things in my mind..."

In a discussion of her 2017 film Close-Knit, Ogigami states that the film, which deals with issues of transgender identity within contemporary Japanese society, was received well in the larger cities Tokyo and Osaka. However, the films were less successful in more rural areas of Japan, to which Ogigami expressed her surprise: "I didn’t expect it because we have a popular show on TV with a big transgender star, a comedy that we love and appreciate, but I guess that if LGBT people are in the family or neighborhood, that is a totally different story, they are not accepted." Regardless, the film was received well overseas, earning the Panorama Audience Award and becoming the first Japanese film to win the Teddy Award at the Berlin International Film Festival.

== Filmography ==
=== Film ===
- Ayako (short) (1999)
- Hoshino-kun, Yumino-kun (short) (2001)
- Yoshino's Barber Shop (2004)
- Love Is Five, Seven, Five! (2005)
- Kamome Diner (2006)
- Glasses (2007)
- Toilet (2010)
- Rent-a-Cat (2012)
- Close-Knit (2017)
- Riverside Mukolitta (2022)
- Ripples (2023)
- Maru (2024)

=== Television ===
- Saboten Journey (2004)
- Yappari Neko Ga Suki (2005)
- 2Cool (2008)
- Roudokuya (2017)
- Rilakkuma and Kaoru (2019)
- Coffee Ikaga Deshou (2021)
- Modern Love Tokyo (2022, episode 4)

=== Books ===
- Kawapperi Mukoritta (2019)

== Awards and nominations ==
Year	Film	Festival	Award	Notes
2001	Hoshino-kun, Yumino-kun	PIA Film Festival	PIA Festival Scholarship Award	Won
2001	Hoshino-kun, Yumino-kun	PIA Film Festival	Best Music	Won
2001	Hoshino-kun, Yumino-kun	PIA Film Festival	Audience Award	Won
2004	Yoshino's Barber Shop	PIA Film Festival	PIA Festival Scholarship Award	Won
2004	Yoshino's Barber Shop	Berlin International Film Festival	Special Mention - Best Feature Film	Won
2006	Kamome Diner		Shindo Kaneto Award	Silver Prize
2007	Kamome Diner	Amakusa Film Festival	Wind Prize	Won
2007	Glasses		Fujimoto Prize	Special Award
2008	Glasses	Berlin International Film Festival	Manfred Salzgeber Award	Won
2008	Glasses	Sundance Film Festival	Grand Jury Prize for Dramatic World Cinema	Nominated
2008	Glasses	San Francisco International Film Festival	Special mention: FIPRESCI Prize	Won
2010	Toilet		Yamaji Fumiko Culture Award	Won
2011	Toilet		Art Encouragement Award	Won
2012	Rent-a-Cat	Oslo Films From The South Festival	Best Feature	Nominated
2017	Close-Knit	Berlin International Film Festival	Audience Award, Teddy Jury Award	Won
2017	Close-Knit	Helsinki International Film Festival	Audience Award	Won
2017	Close-Knit	Queer Lisboa	Audience Award	Won
2018	Close-knit	Tromsø International Film Festival	Audience Award	Won
