= Gazzara (surname) =

Gazzara is an Italian surname. Notable people with the surname include:

- Anthony V. Gazzara (born 1937), American lawyer and politician
- Ben Gazzara (1907–1996), American actor and director of film, stage, and television
- Michele Gazzara (born 1990), Italian cyclist

== See also ==
- Gazzara (disambiguation)
- Gazzera
