= Motelli Skronkle =

Finnish post-punk/art-rock band

Motelli Skronkle was a Finnish post-punk/art-rock band principally active between 1983 and 1994.

Formed by theatre director Hannu Raatikainen, theatre actor Esko Varonen, and film actor Markku Peltola (best known for his frequent appearances in the films of Aki Kaurismäki, including a starring role in the Oscar-nominated Man Without a Past), the band was strongly influenced by performance art and incorporated European theatrical traditions alongside aesthetics influenced by Australian Aboriginal music and Japanese Noh theatre. Following the three original members, Peter Rajanti joined the band in 1987, followed by Jakke Kivelä in 1990.

In keeping with the theatre/drama background of its founders, Motelli Skronkle's performances were accordingly theatrical. Writer Saku Heinonen summed the band up with the description, "Theatre, music, performance, blasphemy," but mused that 20 years on the band had become in Finland "a cultural institution [despite being created for the very] purpose [of] resisting cultural institutions and all kinds of structures."

The band released three full-length albums on the Finnish label Seal on Velvet, followed by a retrospective anthology in 2000. Though they had been inactive for some time, they began playing together again in the early 2000s, including sets at the 2003 Karma Rock and 2006 Provinssirock festivals, by which time they had earned the mantle of a "legendary" group among some Finnish music fans.

Following Peltola's death in December 2007, Motelli Skronkle has continued to exist for reunion concerts, consisting of Hannu Raatikainen, Esko Varonen and Peter Rajanti. After Varonen died in 2019, Kivelä returned as a drummer. In addition to the original members Raatikainen, Rajanni (bass, guitar) and Kivelä, the current line-up (2020) includes Tuomas Luukkonen (guitar) and Mirkku Mattinen (cello, vocals).

== Discography ==
- Motelli Skronkle (1990)
- Susien laki (1992)
- Koi (1994)
- Collection (Kokoelma, 2000)
