= Rent-a-Cat =

- Film poster
- Directed by: Naoko Ogigami
- Written by: Naoko Ogigami
- Produced by: Kumi Kobata; Shûichi Komuro
- Starring: Mikako Ichikawa; Reiko Kusamura; Ken Mitsuishi
- Cinematography: Kazutaka Abe
- Distributed by: Suurkiitos
- Release date: May 12, 2012 (Japan)
- Running time: 110 minutes
- Country: Japan

Rent-a-Cat (Japanese: レンタネコ, Hepburn: Rentaneko) is a Japanese comedy-drama film written and directed by Naoko Ogigami. It premiered at 2012 Stockholm International Film Festival and was also featured in 17th Busan International Film Festival.

== Cast ==
- Mikako Ichikawa as Sayoko
- Reiko Kusamura as Toshiko Yoshioka
- Ken Mitsuishi as Goro Yoshida
- Maho Yamada as Megumi Yoshikawa
- Kei Tanaka as Shigaru Yoshizawa
