= Yoshino's Barber Shop =

2004 Japanese coming-of-age film by Naoko Ogigami

- Promotional release poster
- Directed by: Naoko Ogigami
- Written by: Naoko Ogigami
- Starring: Masako Motai; Ryo Yoneda; Kazuyuki Asano; Senri Sakurai; Shota Okawa; Ryo Muramatsu; Shinnosuke Miyao; Hoshi Isida
- Release date: April 10, 2004 (Japan)
- Running time: 96 minutes
- Country: Japan
- Language: Japanese

Yoshino's Barber Shop (Japanese: バーバー吉野, Hepburn: Barber Yoshino) is a 2004 Japanese coming-of-age film written and directed by Naoko Ogigami in her feature directorial debut. It stars Masako Motai as the titular Yoshino, a barber who ensures that every young boy in her village has a bowl-shaped haircut. When a boy with dyed hair (Hoshi Isida) arrives from Tokyo and refuses to conform to the town's bowl cut, he sparks a rebellion against Yoshino and village tradition.

== Cast ==
- Masako Motai as Yoshiko Yoshino
- Ryo Yoneda as Keita
- Kazuyuki Asano
- Senri Sakurai as Grandpa Mikawa
- Shota Okawa as Yaji
- Ryo Muramatsu
- Shinnosuke Miyao
- Hoshi Isida as Yosuke Sagami

== Reception ==
Variety's Russell Edwards wrote that the film "schematically uses the village as a microcosm for Japan, and it's not without amusing moments", but noted that "The amount of four-letter words smattered throughout the dialogue — and the pivotal role pornography plays in the storyline — will have conservative Western [audiences] looking askance at this kidpic oddity." Tom Horgen of the Minnesota Daily wrote that "The film's gorgeous visuals and comedic tone give it a whimsical, almost fluffy feeling. But don't be fooled. Its depiction of the proverbial tug-of-war between tradition and new ideas is quite involving." In a review of the film for Midnight Eye, Jasper Sharp concluded: "A great piece of independent filmmaking that actually has something to say, Yoshino's Barber Shop is the kind of low-key offering that, unfortunately, far too seldom makes it past the film festival circuit".
