= Lizzy Goodman =

American journalist and author

- Born: Elizabeth Goodman; 1980 or 1981 (age 44–45)
- Education: University of Pennsylvania
- Occupations: Journalist; author
- Writing career
- Subject: Music
- Notable work: Meet Me in the Bathroom (2017)

Lizzy Goodman is an American journalist and author. She has written for NME, Rolling Stone, Elle, New York Magazine, and the New York Times. Her book about the New York indie rock music scene of the early 2000s, Meet Me in the Bathroom (2017), was later turned into a documentary film of the same name.

== Early life ==
Goodman grew up in Corrales, New Mexico. The first concert she bought tickets for and attended with friends was Bush at Tingley Coliseum in Albuquerque, New Mexico on March 22, 1996.

She studied English at University of Pennsylvania. The summer after her freshman year of college she stayed with her grandmother in Manhattan. She got a job at a cafe where she befriended Nick Valensi.

In the early 2000s she worked as a teacher at Buckley School in Manhattan, and lived with Sarah Lewitinn in an apartment on the Lower East Side between 2002 and 2005.

== Career ==
Goodman's career in journalism started as an intern at SPIN. She wrote for Interview and NYLON, before being hired by Rolling Stone, where she later said she "was the only woman in the office on the editorial side, and […] the lowest person on the totem pole."

Her biography of the musician Cat Power, Cat Power: A Good Woman, was published in 2009 by Crown Publishing. This was followed by a book on Lady Gaga's fashion and stagewear titled Lady Gaga: Critical Mass Fashion, which was published in 2010 by St. Martin's Griffin.

In 2017 her book Meet Me in the Bathroom: Rebirth and Rock and Roll in New York City 2001-2011 was published. About the New York indie scene in the early 2000s, it featured interviews with The Strokes, Karen O and James Murphy and others.

In 2022, the film Meet Me in the Bathroom, based on her book, was released.

== Books ==
- Cat Power: A Good Woman (Crown Publishing, 2009) (Note: as Elizabeth Goodman.)
- Lady Gaga: Critical Mass Fashion (St. Martin's Griffin, 2010)
- Meet Me in the Bathroom (Dey Street Books, 2017)
