= Reiko Kusamura =

Japanese actress

- Born: July 5, 1940 (age 85); Tokyo, Japan
- Occupation: Actress
- Years active: 1978–present

Reiko Kusamura (草村礼子) is a Japanese actress. She won the award for best supporting actress at the 18th Yokohama Film Festival for Shall We Dance?

== Filmography ==
=== Film ===
- Shall We Dance? (1996)
- The Twilight Samurai (2002)
- Kamen Rider × Kamen Rider × Kamen Rider The Movie: Cho-Den-O Trilogy (2010)
- Rent-a-Cat (2012)
- Orange (2015)
- A Day with No Name (2021)
- Mission: Sorta Possible (2025)

=== Television ===
- Aoi (2000)
- Welcome Home, Monet (2021), Fumie
