= Bumblefuck, USA =

- Film poster
- Directed by: Aaron Douglas Johnston
- Written by: Aaron Douglas Johnston; Cat Smits
- Produced by: Aaron Douglas Johnston; Judith de Weert
- Starring: Cat Smits; Heidi M. Sallows
- Release date: June 17, 2011 (Frameline)
- Running time: 91 minutes
- Country: United States
- Language: English

Bumblefuck, USA is a 2011 film containing both dramatic and documentary elements about lesbian and gay life experienced by a Dutch woman arriving in the United States heartland. The movie was featured on Autostraddle as one of "8 Pretty Great Lesbian Movies You Haven’t Seen Yet".

== Accolades ==
- Frameline 35 - official selection
- Outfest 2011 - official selection
