= Meet Me in the Bathroom (book) =

2017 oral history book by Lizzy Goodman

- Author: Lizzy Goodman
- Language: English
- Subject: New York rock revival, post-punk revival
- Genre: Non-fiction
- Publisher: Dey Street Books
- Publication date: 2017
- Publication place: United States
- Pages: 640 pp
- ISBN: 978-0-06-223309-7 (Hardcover)

Meet Me in the Bathroom: Rebirth and Rock and Roll in New York City 2001–2011 is an oral history which details the rebirth of the New York rock scene in the new millennium, written and compiled by music journalist Lizzy Goodman. It was published in May 2017 by Dey Street Books, an imprint of HarperCollins. The book is named after the Strokes song of the same name from their 2003 album Room on Fire, the cover is a photograph of Karen O of the Yeah Yeah Yeahs at their Central Park SummerStage performance in 2004.

== Summary ==
Meet Me in the Bathroom details the rise of New York's music scene post-9/11. The book details both influential musicians of the decade and the culture that surrounded them, including the declining music industry, internet culture, and the booming real estate market in Lower Manhattan and Williamsburg. Meet Me in the Bathroom follows some of the most prominent musical artists of the period, including the Strokes, the Yeah Yeah Yeahs, LCD Soundsystem, and Interpol.

Over six years, Goodman conducted more than 200 original interviews for the book with members of these bands as well as other musicians, artists, journalists, bloggers, managers, music executives, groupies, DJs, and other prominent voices from that time period. Goodman's assistants in the editing and transcription process were Maggie Rogers and Eva Hendricks, both of whom were students at New York University Tisch School of the Arts' Clive Davis Institute of Recorded Music at the time, and would later become known as musicians in their own right.

== Reception ==
Meet Me in the Bathroom was critically praised by both literary and music publications, with SPIN calling it "the first great history of New York’s 21st-century rock scene". It was named one of the best books of the year by NPR and GQ.

Controversy surrounded the promotion of the book when an excerpt was released by New York magazine on May 15, 2017. The piece featured interviews with Ryan Adams and Strokes members Julian Casablancas, Albert Hammond Jr., Fabrizio Moretti, and Nick Valensi as well as various journalists and affiliates of the music industry. Among other topics, the piece focused on the drug use of guitarist Albert Hammond Jr. with many interviewees claiming that Ryan Adams furthered Hammond's use of heroin, a claim Adams denies. This claim generated controversy which came to a head on July 31, 2017, when Adams lashed out to the Strokes on Twitter. Adams later removed these comments but they were widely published in music publications. Goodman has said that she did not intend to cause controversy with her book.

== Adaptations ==
In December 2017, it was announced that Pulse Films would turn the book into a four-part documentary, Meet Me in the Bathroom, directed by Will Lovelace and Dylan Southern, who also directed the LCD Soundsystem documentary Shut Up and Play the Hits. Author Lizzy Goodman was one of the executive producers. The project premiered at the 2022 Sundance Film Festival on January 23, 2022.

In September 2019, Goodman adapted the content of the book as a gallery exhibition at The Hole in Manhattan.

== Notes ==
Lizzy Goodman, Meet Me in the Bathroom: Rebirth and Rock and Roll in New York City, 2001–2011, (New York: Dey Street Books/HarperCollins, 2017)
