= Will Lovelace =

English film director

Will Lovelace is an English film director and writer.

In 2010, his film No Distance Left to Run was nominated for the Grammy for Best Long Form Music Video.

== Filmography ==
- No Distance Left to Run (2010)
- Shut Up and Play the Hits (2012)
- Aziz Ansari: Buried Alive (2013)
- Meet Me in the Bathroom (2022)
- Oasis: Don't Look Back in Anger (2026)
