= The We and the I =

2012 film

- Film poster
- Directed by: Michel Gondry
- Written by: Michel Gondry; Paul Proch and Jeff Grimshaw
- Produced by: Raffi Adlan; Georges Bermann
- Starring: Joe Mele; Monica Pinto; Francesca Pinto; Michael Brodie; Teresa Lynn
- Cinematography: Alex Disenhof
- Edited by: Jeff Buchanan
- Production company: Partizan Films
- Distributed by: Kinology; Mars distribution 108 Media
- Release dates: May 17, 2012 (Cannes); March 8, 2013 (US)
- Running time: 103 minutes
- Country: United States
- Language: English
- Box office: $293,605

The We and the I is a 2012 American comedy-drama film co-written and directed by Michel Gondry. The film is about teenagers who ride the same bus route on their last day of high school. It was shot in The South Bronx, New York City, New York.

The film was screened in the Directors' Fortnight section at the 2012 Cannes Film Festival. It won International Critics' prize at 2012 Deauville American Film Festival. During the 2012 Toronto International Film Festival, 108 Media and Paladin acquired the North American rights to the film, with a release date of March 8, 2013.

== Cast ==
- Michael Brodie as Michael
- Monica Pinto as Daughter
- Francesca Pinto as Daughter
- Nicholas Pinto as Son
- Teresa Lynn as Teresa
- Laidychen Carrasco as Laidychen
- Raymond Delgado as Little Raymond
- Jonathan Ortiz as Jonathan
- Raymond Rios as Big Raymond
- Jonathan Worrell as Big T
- Alex Raul Barrios as Alex
- Meghan Niomi Murphy as Niomi
- Brandon Diaz as Brandon
- Elijah Canada as Elijah
- Esmeralda Herrera as Esmeralda
- Manuel Rivera as Manuel
- Luis Figueroa as Luis
- Jacobchen Carrasco as Jacobchen
- Mia Lobo as Bus Driver
- Amanda Kay Riley as Beautiful Girl On Bike
- Jillian Rice as Jillian
- Kenneth Quinonez as Kenny
- Amanda Mercado as Amy
