= Toilet (film) =

- Theatrical release poster
- Directed by: Naoko Ogigami
- Written by: Naoko Ogigami
- Produced by: Sean Buckley; Kumi Kobata; Shûichi Komuro
- Starring: Alex House; Tatiana Maslany
- Cinematography: Michael LeBlanc
- Edited by: James Blokland
- Music by: James Chapple; Graeme Cornies; Dave Kelly; Brian L. Pickett; Voodoo Highway
- Distributed by: Showgate
- Release date: August 28, 2010
- Running time: 109 minutes
- Countries: Japan; Canada
- Language: English

Toilet is a 2010 English-language Japanese-Canadian drama film written and directed by Naoko Ogigami and starring Alex House and Tatiana Maslany.

== Plot ==
Ray's mom dies and he moves back in with his siblings and his Japanese grandmother.

== Cast ==
- Masako Motai as Bachan
- Alex House as Ray
- Tatiana Maslany as Lisa
- David Rendall as Maury

== Production ==
Although the story is set in the United States, the film was shot in Toronto.
