= Kamome Shokudo =

Kamome Diner
- Taiwanese release film poster
- Directed by: Naoko Ogigami
- Written by: Naoko Ogigami
- Based on: Kamome Shokudo by Yōko Mure
- Produced by: Mayumi Amano
- Starring: Hairi Katagiri; Satomi Kobayashi; Tarja Markus; Masako Motai; Jarkko Niemi; Markku Peltola
- Cinematography: Tuomo Virtanen
- Edited by: Shinichi Fushima
- Music by: Tatsuro Kondo
- Distributed by: Nippon Television Network Corporation
- Release date: 2006
- Running time: 102 minutes
- Country: Japan
- Languages: Japanese; Finnish

Kamome Diner (Japanese: かもめ食堂, Hepburn: Kamome shokudō) is a 2006 comedy film written and directed by Japanese director Naoko Ogigami, based on a novel by Yōko Mure. The film is set in the Finnish capital Helsinki, and follows a Japanese woman who sets up a diner serving Japanese food in the city, and the friends she makes in the process.

Cast members include: Hairi Katagiri (Midori), Satomi Kobayashi (Sachie, the shopkeeper), Masako Motai (Masako), Markku Peltola (Matti), Tarja Markus (Liisa), and Jarkko Niemi (Tommi).

== Plot ==
Sachie is a Japanese woman living alone in Helsinki, who is trying single-handedly to establish a new cafe serving Japanese-style food. However, it has no customers. Eventually a young Finnish anime enthusiast comes for coffee and becomes the cafe's first regular, though as her first customer he gets to eat and drink there for free.

Midori is a Japanese woman who has just arrived in Finland for an indefinite time and without any definite plans. She and Sachie happen to meet in a bookstore and she starts to help out in the cafe. Later, Masako, another Japanese woman on her own, turns up. Her baggage has been lost by an airline, and before long she too starts to work in the cafe. Over the course of the film, the cafe gradually gains more customers, and the Japanese women make more friends with the local people.

== Reception ==
It was the 5th Best Film at the 28th Yokohama Film Festival.

== Tourist attraction ==
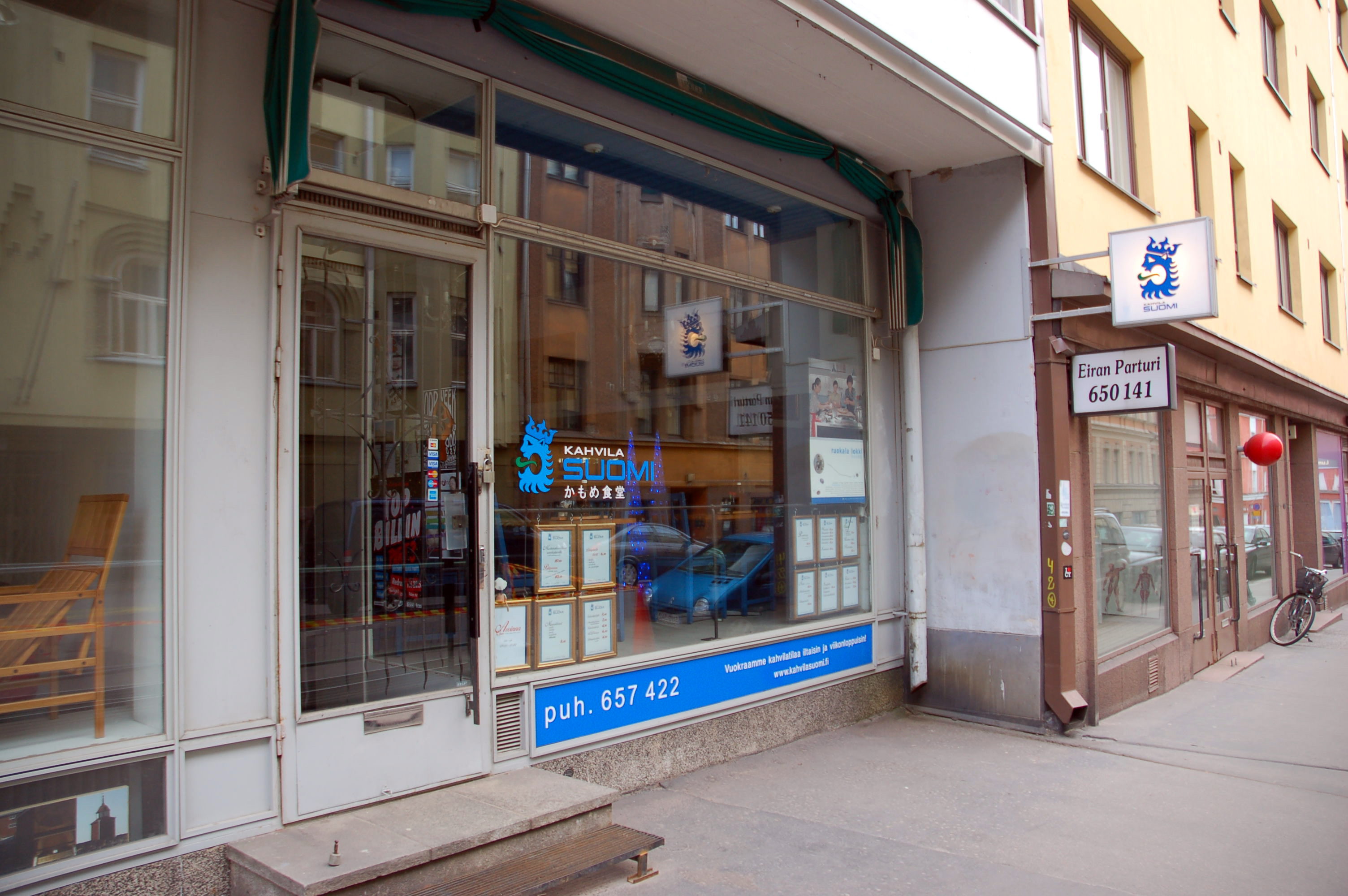
Kahvila Suomi, which served as the filming location of the film, in Punavuori

The film was filmed in a real cafe in downtown Helsinki, at the address Pursimiehenkatu 12 in the Punavuori district, its real name was Kahvila Suomi (Finland Cafe). The original decor of the cafe was taken out for the filming and replaced by Finnish designer furniture. The original interior was returned afterwards. The current restaurant in the premises is Ravintola Kamome (Restaurant Kamome), which resembles the fictional cafe, and is a popular destination for Japanese tourists visiting Helsinki.
