= Dylan Southern =

English film director

Dylan Southern is an English film director and writer.

In 2010, his film No Distance Left to Run was nominated for the Grammy for Best Long Form Music Video.

== Filmography ==
- No Distance Left to Run (2010)
- Shut Up and Play the Hits (2012)
- Aziz Ansari: Buried Alive (2013)
- Meet Me in the Bathroom (2022)
- The Thing with Feathers (2025)
- Oasis: Don't Look Back in Anger (2026)
