= Lucy Mulloy =

British film director and screenwriter

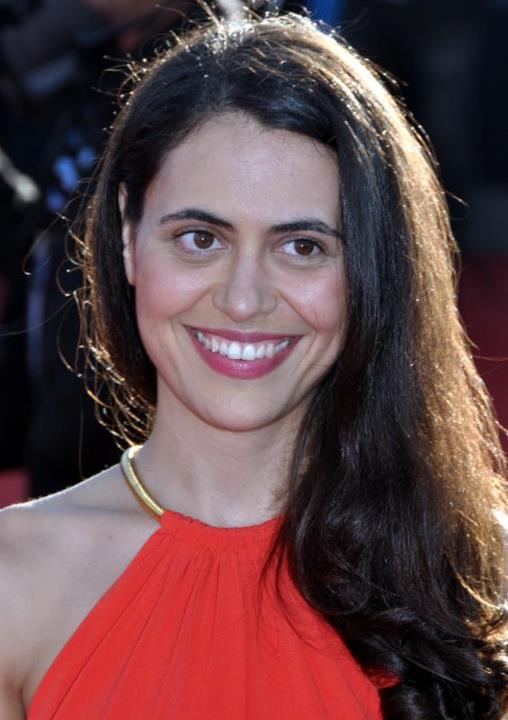
- Lucy Mulloy in 2012 at the Deauville American Film Festival
- Education: University of Oxford; New York University
- Occupations: Director; producer; screenwriter; cinematographer

Lucy Mulloy is a British screenwriter, film director, producer, and cinematographer. She was nominated for the Student Academy Award for her NYU short film "This Morning". In 2010 Mulloy was awarded the Tribeca Film Festival Emerging Narrative Talent Award and in 2012 she won the Tribeca Film Festival as Best New Director. Her debut feature, Una Noche, also won Best Cinematography and Best Actor. She went on to win many awards internationally and Mulloy was nominated for Best New First Feature at the 2014 Spirit Awards.

== Early life ==
Mulloy studied Politics, Philosophy and Economics at Oxford University, St Hugh's College and Film at Tisch School of the Arts, New York University. She is the daughter of acclaimed animators Phil Mulloy and Vera Neubauer.

== Biography ==
Her first year short film, while studying at Tisch, This Morning received a Student Academy Award Nomination.

Mulloy spent years in Havana researching for her first feature Una Noche.

Whilst in Cuba Mulloy's story developed as she searched for young untrained talent to take the lead roles. In April 2010, with Una Noche in production, Mulloy was awarded the Creative Promise Emerging Narrative Award at Tribeca Film Festival. Mulloy is mentored by Spike Lee and in January 2010 won the Spike Lee Production Grant Award for Una Noche. Winner 2010 Adrienne Shelly Foundation /IFP Directors grant, Winner 2011 Euphoria Calvin Klein Spotlight on Women Filmmakers’ ‘Live The Dream’ post production grant at the Gotham Film Awards.

Una Noche premiered at the 2012 Berlin International Film Festival. It went on to scoop the majority of awards at its US premiere at the Tribeca Film Festival including Best Director, Best Actor and Best Cinematography.

The film was met with huge critical acclaim:

"It's safe to say that Lucy Mulloy was born to make films." Indie Wire

== Awards ==
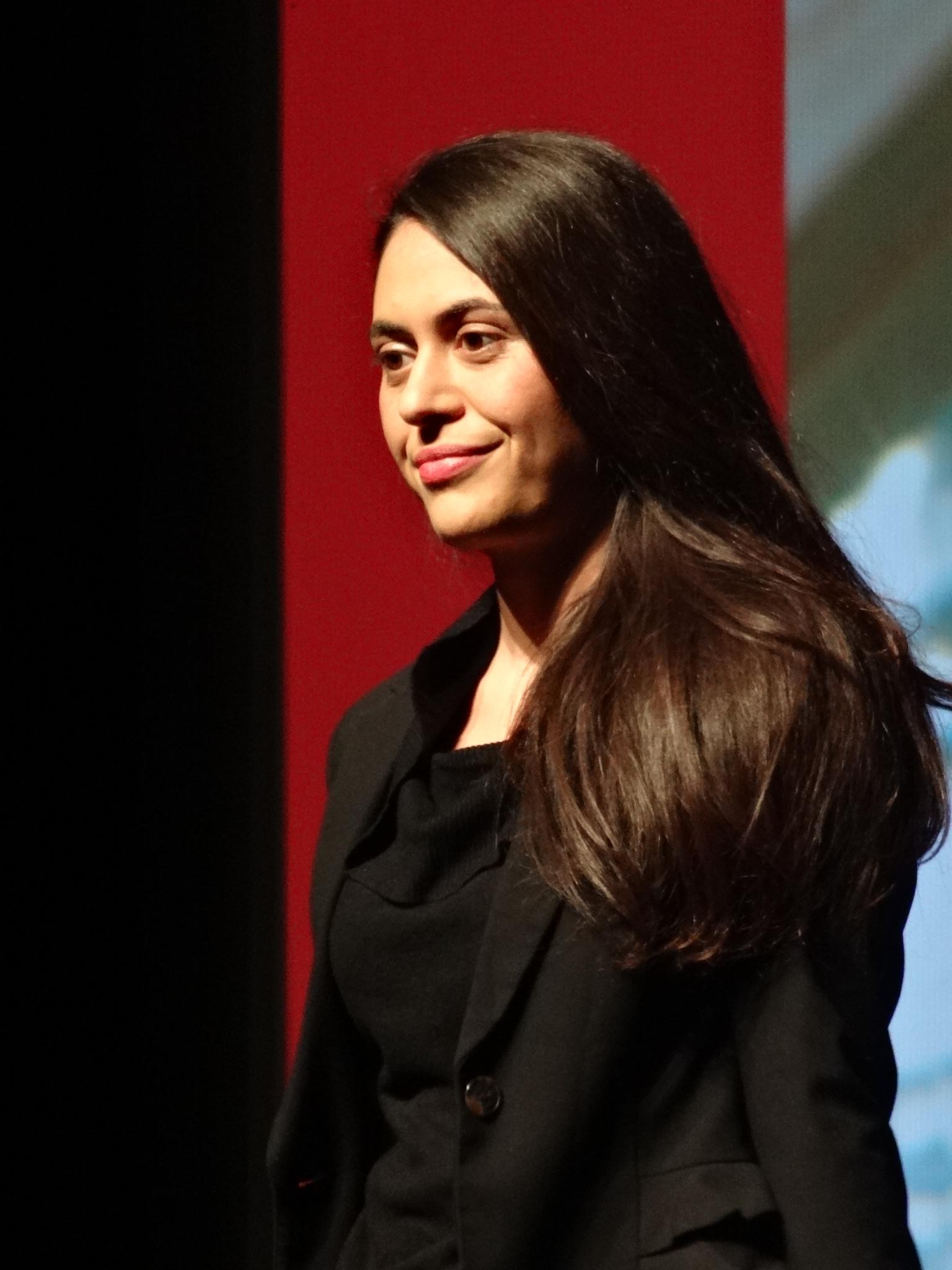
Lucy Mulloy in 2012.

2005 Student Academy Award Nomination for Best Documentary Film This Morning
2010 Tribeca Film Festival Emerging Narrative Award Una Noche
2011 Gotham Award Spotlight Award For Women Filmmakers Una Noche
2012 Tribeca Film Festival Best New Director of a Feature Film Una Noche
2012 Tribeca Film Festival Best Cinematography Una Noche
2012 Tribeca Film Festival Best Actor Una Noche
2012 Berlin Film Festival Nominated for Crystal Bear - Lucy Mulloy
2012 Berlin Film Festival Nominated for Cinema Fairbindet Prize
2012 Berlin Film Festival Finalist for Teddy Award
2012 Brasilia International Film Festival Best Script of a Feature Film Award Una Noche
2012 Deauville American Film Festival Grand Jury Prize Una Noche
2012 Athens International Film Festival Best Script Una Noche
2012 Fort Lauderdale International Film Festival Best Foreign Film Una Noche
2012 Fort Lauderdale International Film Festival Best Director Una Noche
2012 Stockholm International Film Festival Telia Award Una Noche
2012 International Film Festival of India Special Jury Prize Una Noche
2012 Oaxaca Film Festival Best Actor, Javier Nunez Florian Una Noche
2014 Independent Spirit Awards Best First Feature Nomination, Lucy Mulloy Una Noche
2014 Independent Spirit Awards Best Editor Nomination, Cindy Lee Una Noche

== Filmography ==
=== As Writer/Director/Producer ===
Year	Title	Genre	Company	Notes
2007	This Morning	Short	NYU	Student Academy Award Nomination
2012	Una Noche	Feature	Una Noche Films	Tribeca Film Festival Best New Narrative Filmmaker
