= My Sister's Quinceañera =

- Film poster
- Directed by: Aaron Douglas Johnston
- Cinematography: Hayo van Gemert
- Music by: Juho Nurmela and Alekos Vuskovic
- Release date: January 28, 2013 (Rotterdam)
- Running time: 72 minutes
- Country: United States
- Language: English

My Sister's Quinceañera is a 2013 documentary-drama by director Aaron Douglas Johnston. It is a rural coming-of-age drama about circumstances, American aspirations, and the effect of family ties. The film stars Elizabeth Agapito, Becky Garcia, and Josefina Garcia.

The film premiered at the 2013 International Film Festival Rotterdam.

== Plot ==
Made with Mexican-American residents of Iowa with no prior acting experience, My Sister's Quinceañera tells the fictional story of one family's experience living in small town America. Big brother Silas is the involuntary man of the house. He does his best to take care of his five siblings and help his single mother as the family prepares for his sister's fifteenth birthday, but he dreams of leaving Muscatine and starting a new life for himself.

== Critical reception ==
The Hollywood Reporter says "audiences will warm to the vivid characters."

Rotterdam Film Festival's Movie Mezzanine says the film "is what real indie film looks like. Made for pennies on the dollar with a cast of non-actors, it's a small, quiet, but effective slice of life."

Film Pulse says the film "delivers a simple, honest, and watchable 70 minute immersion into a subject that's rarely given the attention it deserves. Johnston's quiet and careful eye makes this enjoyable for anyone who favors modesty and simplicity over showiness and overburdened storylines."

== Awards ==
2014 Independent Spirit Awards – Someone to Watch Award (Nominated)

2013 International Film Festival Rotterdam – Official Selection
