= Meet Me in the Bathroom (film) =

2022 music documentary film

- United Kingdom theatrical poster
- Directed by: Will Lovelace; Dylan Southern
- Based on: Meet Me in the Bathroom by Lizzy Goodman
- Produced by: Vivienne Perry; Sam Bridger; Marisa Clifford; Thomas Benski; Danny Gabai; Suroosh Alvi; Lizzy Goodman
- Cinematography: Nanci Sarrouf; Jason Banker; Scott Crary; Peter Dizozza; Joly MacFie
- Production companies: Pulse Films; XTR; British Film Institute
- Distributed by: Utopia (US); Showtime Networks (US)
- Release date: January 23, 2022
- Running time: 107 minutes
- Countries: United States; United Kingdom
- Language: English
- Box office: $500,000

Meet Me in the Bathroom is a 2022 indie rock documentary film directed by Will Lovelace and Dylan Southern, based on the 2017 book of the same name by Lizzy Goodman. The documentary focuses on the 'golden age' of the indie rock genre in New York City and how the September 11 attacks affected the American revival of rock music.

The documentary focuses on the early days of The Strokes, the Yeah Yeah Yeahs, LCD Soundsystem, and Interpol, splicing together archived interviews, concerts, and home videos from band members and their families.

The film premiered at the 2022 Sundance Film Festival, and received mixed reviews opposite the positives of its original material. While not a critical success, the film continued with a limited run in theaters a year after its digital release.

== Synopsis ==
The film begins with a performance of The Moldy Peaches, which transfers into the forming relationship of the Moldy Peaches and The Strokes through Adam Green meeting Julian Casablancas at a rooftop party. This friendship led to the Moldy Peaches becoming a supporting act for the Strokes on their 2001 tour for their album Is This It, while the Moldy Peaches had subsequently released their self-titled album. This then leads the focus towards the Strokes guitarist Albert Hammond Jr's experience with heroin at the alleged encouragement of Ryan Adams and Casablancas' disconnectedness with fame within the scene.

Watchers are then introduced to the formation of the Yeah Yeah Yeahs, where Karen O had been playing guitar and singing in bars, before forming a band with friend Brian Chase and Nick Zinner. O explains her relationship with anxiety through the insecurity of her racial identity and being a loner. She then adopted a persona on stage which caused her to develop self-destructive tendencies. Along with this persona, she was sexualized by the press but still wanted to be taken seriously as an artist. While performing at a festival, she smashed her head on a speaker while falling off stage. She subsequently eased the persona.

Paul Banks is then focused on as the frontman of Interpol, of whom are struggling to get signed to a record label. After this, Banks explains in the earlier days of Interpol he had depression, and desperately wanted to be a part of the larger rock scene, finding inspiration in the Strokes. They then emerged on a failed tour across the UK, before the release of their first album finding success with the record label Matador. The band was greatly affected by the beginning of peer-to-peer file sharing culture. This affected the release of their second album that had been leaked online.

It then moves to how DFA Records was created in 2001 by James Murphy and Tim Goldsworthy after collaborating on the David Holmes album Bow Down to the Exit Sign together in 2000. The duo then signed small band The Rapture who described Murphy as domineering and told him to create his own music instead. Once The Rapture had left the company to find a distributor after the success of their single House of Jealous Lovers, Murphy began to start writing his own music out of his depression of the band leaving. This then led to the creation of the indie rock electronic band LCD Soundsystem.

== Background ==
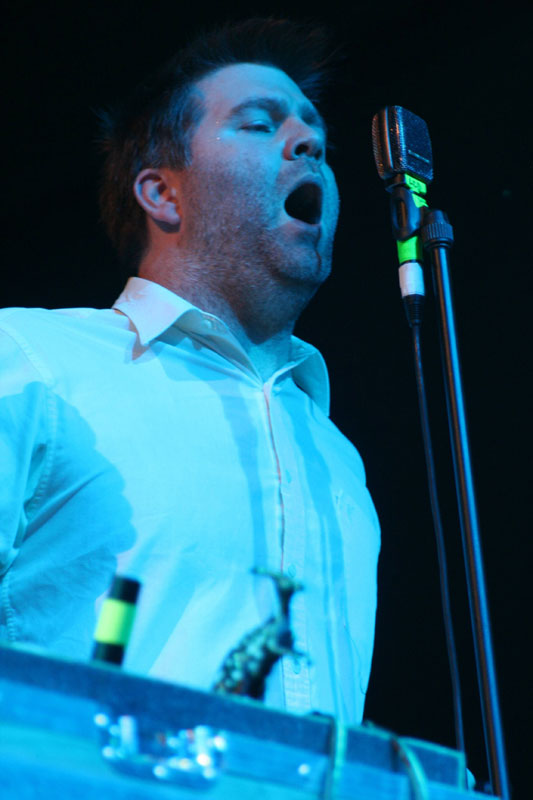
James Murphy of LCD Soundsystem, wearing a white button-up shirt as an example of business casual attire at Coachella, 2007

The film goes into depth on focusing on late 90s–2000s New York club scene and how several independent bands gained notoriety. The genres of these bands ended up contributing to the ever growing revival of garage rock and post-punk. Each band found themselves expanding on pop experimental material, including synth-pop and distorted vocals, these elements would later be found in 2000s recession music. There was also bright colors dabbled into on stage-costumes, such as monochrome body suits, headdressess, and business casual which then inspired hipster fashion.

The Meet Me in the Bathroom oral history novel by Lizzy Goodman was released to great acclaim in 2017, from music critics and historians. Mainly for its length and what was considered 'unseen' history for moments lost in the New York underground art and music scene. Focusing not only on the artists themselves, but also DJs, club owners, bartenders, and music journalists of the time.

== Production ==
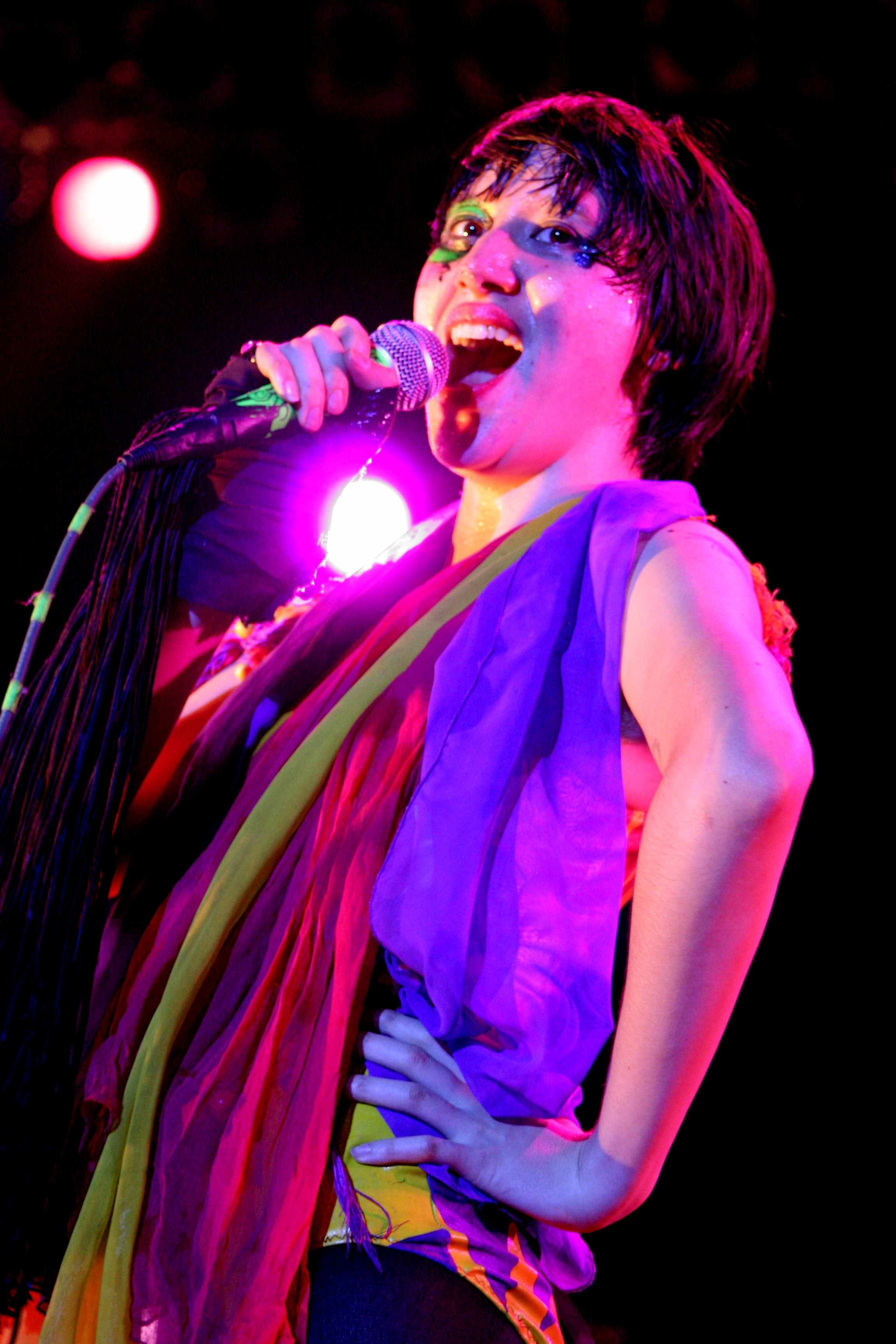
Karen O of the Yeah Yeah Yeahs, 2006

Lovelace and Southern lived in England and were fresh out of university during the early days of the indie sleaze movement and knew that, "something was happening" in the U.S. The two were keenly aware of the Strokes rise to fame, and were following the rock scene through filming local Liverpool bands and corporate films. Before Meet Me in the Bathroom, they'd also worked on documentaries in 2010 with Blur in No Distance Left To Run and in 2012 with LCD Soundsystem for Shut Up and Play the Hits. For the production, some archived film and photographs have been accredited to Nanci Sarrouf, and the Pulse Films archive.

In a Nylon interview with original author Lizzy Goodman on her role as an exclusive producer, she deemed the film "an educational living and breathing archive." She left creative control to Southern and Lovelace but still provided the duo with interview footage and audio recordings. She wanted them to have this film as their own project.

Karen O of the Yeah Yeah Yeahs was heavily involved in how her experience as a woman in the scene would be documented with Southern and Lovelace. The film goes into how O faced frequent sexualization and was a victim of sensationalism,

"It was really interesting to hear that perspective on that time, because quite often when you look back it's a lot of white boys in skinny jeans and Converse, and she had a very specific role in that period. She talks about the way that she was objectified by photographers and in the press and sometimes found it hard to be taken seriously as an artist. Through the prism of today, that’s an interesting aspect of that period. They all seem quite comfortable talking about the lows of it, because all of those rock’n’roll cliches reared their heads relatively soon for those bands."

— Southern

The film begins and ends with Ed Begley reading Walt Whitman's 1860 poem Mannahatta. The film provides the point of view of the September 11 attacks as being a destruction of community, while the revival of punk-rock bands served as a distraction. Music was used in the film to be seen as a coping mechanism away from generational devastation and conservative uprising.

== Release ==
The film was showcased at the 2022 Sundance Film Festival. Separate premiere events were held highlighting performances of indie band The Moldy Peaches who were featured in the film. Other premiere events occurred in New York and Los Angeles several times through October and November before its one theatrical night on 8 November. It was available to stream on Showtime by 25 November. It was disturbed in the US under Utopia with UTA Independent Film Group representing the filmmakers.

== Reception ==
=== Box Office ===
Meet Me in the Bathroom grossed $319,000 domestically, where it was screened for a limited time in the United Kingdom, Australia, and New Zealand. It then grossed to $500,000 at 157 theaters internationally.

=== Critical reception ===
On the review aggregator website Rotten Tomatoes, 74% of 50 critics' reviews are positive, with an average rating of 6.3/10. The website's critics consensus reads, "Meet Me in the Bathroom never digs too deep beneath the surface of the musical scene it commemorates, but it's a reasonably effective time capsule regardless." Metacritic, which uses a weighted average, assigned the film a score of 64 out of 100, based on 17 critics, indicating the documentary as "generally favorable". The positives of the documentary are highlighted towards nostalgia, but also remained its downfall.

Andrew Barker of Variety writes about the effect of this era of music on the future, but notes that the bands in the film didn't realize or consider the degree to which their work would influence the future. Barker writes, "[Meet Me in the Bathroom] isn’t terribly interested in dissecting What It All Meant, but revisiting this period twenty years later, one notices how much perspectives have changed." Barker observes that White artists have dominated the music scene and that this documentary does not do much to address Black representation in the music scene: the film is "(...) less attuned to matters of race and class" and "if others were dealing with tensions like these, they don’t mention it."

Ryan Lattanzio of IndieWire gave the film a C+ because of its lack of structure, explaining that the film seemed like it was held together by "(...) glue and paperclips" much like the actual culture it was capturing. Lattanzio often references the Walt Whitman quote from the beginning and end of the documentary and observes that each line of the poem could be linked to several moments in the film. Whitman's romanticization of "Manhattana" parallels the nostalgia one may feel for this era of music, including the film's subjects: Karen O says in the film that she was “grieving the dissipation of the scene” and “felt nostalgic for when everything happened.”

== Nominations ==
Year	Show	Award	Result	Ref
2022	San Sebastián International Film Festival	Zabaltegi-Tabakalera Prize	Nominated	
2022	DocAviv Film Festival	Best International Film	Nominated	
2022	IndieLisboa International Independent Film Festival	Indiemusic Schweppes Award	Nominated	
