= Cinema Fairbindet =

Former award given at the Berlin International Film Festival

Cinema Fairbindet, stylised CINEMA Fairbindet and meaning "CINEMA connects", was an award given by Germany's Federal Ministry for Economic Cooperation and Development (BMZ) at the Berlinale (Berlin International Film Festival) between 2011 and 2014.

== History ==
The Deutsche Gesellschaft für Internationale Zusammenarbeit (GIZ) launched the CINEMA Fairbindet award (a play on words in German that roughly translates as "cinema connects fairly") on behalf of Germany's Federal Ministry for Economic Cooperation and Development in 2011.

The Arsenal Institute for Film and Video Art and the Federal Agency for Civic Education (bpb) were collaborative partners, and Deutsche Welle supported the film award as a media partner.

== Description ==
The Berlinale represents through its reach and its international reputation a significant place of dialogue, creative interaction and international network and is also the world's largest public film festival. Issues of Development Policy have been addressed in films at the Berlinale for years. Both the programming of the film festival and supporting side events and projects create various opportunities to discuss development policy issues at the Berlinale.

The Cinema Fairbindet, sponsored by the German Federal Ministry for Economic Cooperation and Development (BMZ) was the first cross-section film award at the Berlinale.

It was presented by Germany's development minister Dirk Niebel, and was worth 5,000 euros.

== Objective ==
The award aims at reaching a broad audience for development policy issues, especially for the focus areas of German development policy such as education, health, rural development, good governance, climate change, etc., in order to implement them as societal responsibility. The nominated films take up thematically related elements in an artistic way.

The movies should show the real-life conditions in partner countries without resorting to clichés – and make it clear that if development policy is to be effective in the future, commitment from the business world, civil society, and politics is needed.

The Cinema Fairbindet also promotes a dialogue between the audience, film directors and experts in the field of development cooperation during the Berlinale.

== Award ==
The award includes prize money in addition to the implementation of a German-wide roadshow of the winning film. In up to 25 cities the CINEMA Fairbindet Roadshow offers film screenings with a background information programme in the second half of the year.

== Jury ==
An independent international jury consisting of film and media professionals selects the winning film after the film nominations have been effected by the heads of the various Berlinale sections.

Year	Jury members
2014	Djo Munga, Rania Stephan and Ernst Szebedits
2013	Charles Achaye-Odong, Thomas Heinze, Djo Munga, and Ernst Szebedits
2012	Hala Galal, Thomas Heinze, Ernst Szebedits, and Dima Tarhini
2011	Gerda Meuer, Ernst Szebedits, Gaston Kaboré, and Ina Paule Klink

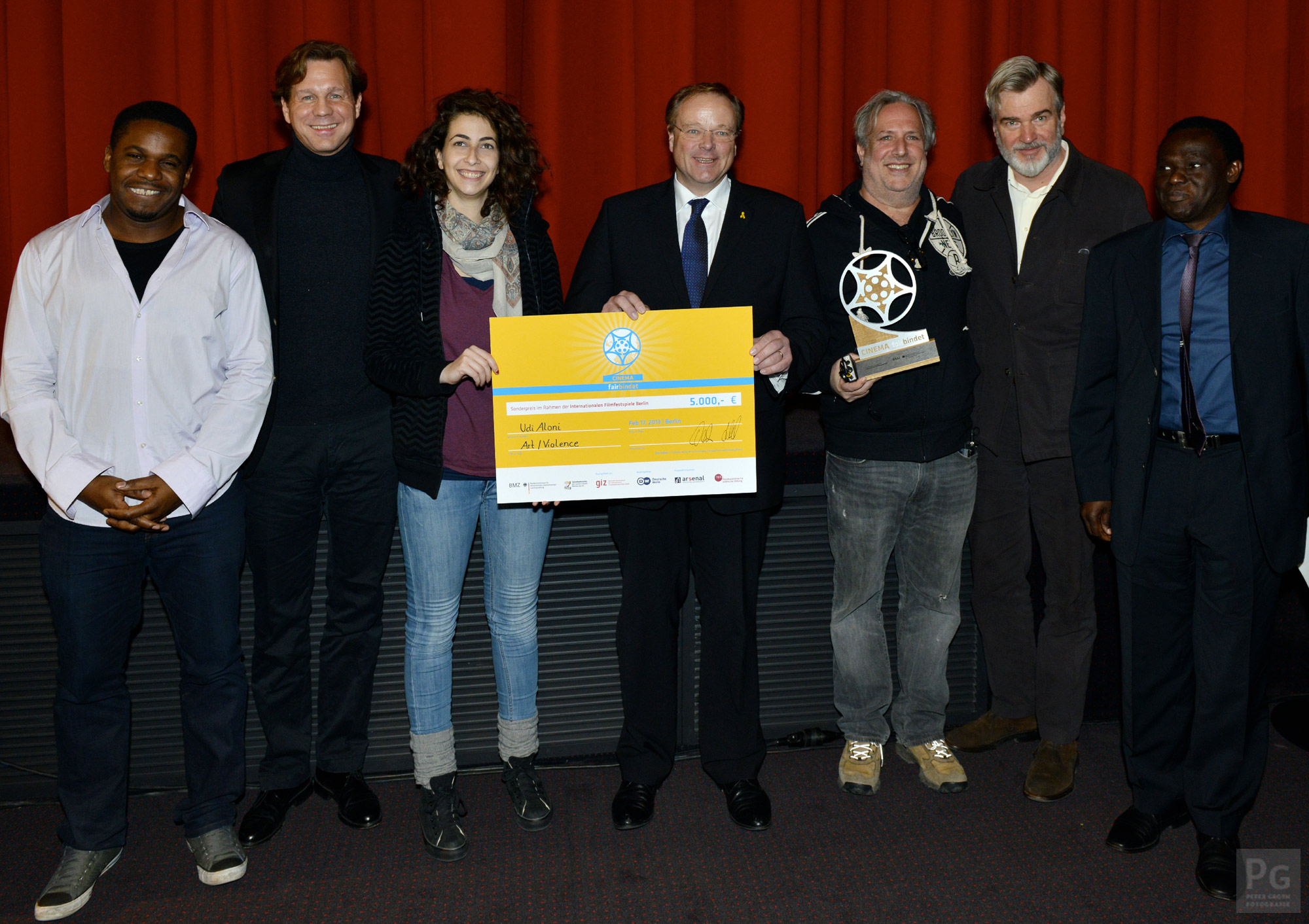
Cinema Fairbindet 2

== Award nominees and winners ==
In 2011, the prize was given to the Iranian director Mohammad-Ali Talebi for his children's film Bad o meh (Wind and Fog), a powerful depiction of the effects of war – especially on children.

In 2012, the award went to the documentary Call me Kuchu, directed by Katherine Fairfax Wright and Malika Zouhali-Worrall. The film shows the life and struggle of gay and lesbian activists in Uganda who worked together with human rights activist David Kato, the first openly gay man in Uganda.

In 2013, German Development Minister awarded the prize to the Palestinian actresses and the director Udi Aloni, Mariam Abu Khaled and Batoul Taleb for their film ART/Violence. They translate their mourning for the murdered Arab-Jewish founder of the Freedom Theatre, Juliano Mer-Khamis into artistic rebellion against patriarchal oppression and the Israeli occupation in their work. Another film nominated that year was Char - The No-Man's Island, directed by Sourav Sarangi.

In 2014 the award was given to the movie Concerning Violence by the Swedish documentary filmmaker and TV journalist Göran Hugo Olsson. The movie is about the African Freedom Movement in the 1960s and 1970s, and merges newly discovered archived materials on the violent confrontation with the colonial powers with quotes from Frantz Fanon's "The Wretched of the Earth", recited by Lauryn Hill. The roadshow took place on 17 September 2014 at Kino Arsenal in Berlin, with a second event on 19 September 2014 in the Rex-Lichtspieltheater in Bonn. There were discussions with the director and others after the screenings, and the documentary was then shown in more than 20 German cities.

The Flowers of Freedom, a film about the people of Kyrgyzstan directed by Mirjam Leuze, was nominated for the award in 2014.

Year	Award winners	Director	Country
2014	Concerning Violence	Göran Hugo Olsson	Sweden
2013	ART/Violence	Udi Aloni, B. Taleb, M. Khaled	Palestinian Territories / USA
2012	Call me Kuchu	Katherine Fairfax Wright and Malika Zouhali-Worrall	Uganda / USA
2011	Bad o meh – Wind and Fog	Mohammad Ali Talebi	Iran
