= Francine (film) =

- Film poster
- Directed by: Brian M. Cassidy; Melanie Shatzky
- Written by: Brian M. Cassidy; Melanie Shatzky
- Produced by: Joshua Blum; Katie Stern
- Starring: Melissa Leo
- Cinematography: Brian M. Cassidy
- Edited by: Benjamin Gray
- Production companies: Pigeon Projects; Washington Square Films
- Distributed by: Factory 25; Film Sales Company
- Release date: February 13, 2012
- Running time: 74 minutes
- Countries: United States; Canada
- Language: English

Francine is a 2012 American-Canadian drama film written and directed by Brian M. Cassidy and Melanie Shatzky and starring Melissa Leo. It is Cassidy and Shatzky's directorial debut.

== Cast ==
- Melissa Leo as Francine
- Victoria Charkut as Linda
- Dave Clark as Pet Shop Manager
- Keith Leonard as Ned
- Laurent Rejto as Clergy Member
- Barbara Sebring-Forman as Hellen
- Jonathan Shatzky as Victor

== Production ==
The film was shot in the Hudson Valley of New York.

== Reception ==
The film has a 60% rating on Rotten Tomatoes. Roger Ebert gave the film three and a half stars out of four. Michael Phillips of the Chicago Tribune gave the film three stars. Keith Uhlich of Time Out gave the film four stars out of five. Eric Kohn of IndieWire gave the film a B−.
