= Aaron Douglas Johnston =

American filmmaker

Aaron Douglas Johnston is an American filmmaker who is based in the Netherlands. He is known for the films Bumblefuck, USA, and My Sister's Quinceañera. Both films focus on outsider themes and mixup the boundary between documentary and fiction through his use of non-professional actors. He has used community funding to provide the small budgets for his films.

== Biography ==
Johnston was born in 1978 and raised in Muscatine, Iowa. He studied sociology at Oxford and Yale before finding his way into filmmaking in the Netherlands. In Amsterdam, he studied directing at the Netherlands Film and Television Academy, where he made the Sundance-selected short Today and Tomorrow, a drama made with and about political asylum seekers living in the Netherlands.

== Awards ==
2014 Independent Spirit Awards – Someone to Watch Award (Nominated)
