= Gazzara (2012 film) =

Gazzara is a 2012 film set in New York, based on the life and career of actor Ben Gazzara who writer/director Joseph Rezwin met in 1977 on the set of John Cassavetes’ Opening Night. Their conversations about acting and art, fears and desires, life and death all culminate in the final Central Park sequence where Ben persuades Joe it is time to cut the cord, end the obsession with him and Cassavetes and pursue his passion of art and filmmaking in his own individual way as Ben did throughout his entire life.
