= Una noche =

- Directed by: Lucy Mulloy
- Written by: Lucy Mulloy
- Produced by: Daniel Mulloy; Lucy Mulloy; Maite Artieda; Sandy Perez Aguila
- Starring: Dariel Arrechaga; Anailín de la Rúa de la Torre; Javier Nuñez Florián
- Cinematography: Shlomo Godder; Trevor Forrest
- Edited by: Cindy Lee
- Production companies: Una Noche Films; Mulloy Productions
- Distributed by: Sundance Selects
- Release date: 16 February 2012 (Berlin International Film Festival)
- Running time: 89 minutes
- Countries: Cuba; UK; US
- Languages: Spanish; English

Una noche (One Night) is a 2012 Cuban-set drama-thriller film written and directed by Lucy Mulloy and starring Dariel Arrechaga, Anailín de la Rúa de la Torre, and Javier Nuñez Florián.

== Plot ==
Trapped in desperate poverty in Havana, Raúl dreams of escaping to Miami. When accused of assaulting a tourist, he sees fleeing Cuba as his only option. He begs his best friend, Elio, to abandon everything, including his family, and help him reach Miami, 90 miles across the ocean. Elio's commitment is tested when he is torn between helping Raúl escape and protecting his twin sister, Lila. The three leave on a raft which Elio made of tires. Sharks are attracted by Lila's menstrual blood seeping into the water. Elio dies when trying to rescue Lila. Raúl and Lila end up adrift, clinging to a styrofoam board, and are pulled to the Cuban shore by British tourists with their jet skis.

== Production ==
Mulloy spent years in Havana researching for her first feature Una noche. Whilst in Cuba Mulloy's story developed as she searched for young untrained talent to take the lead roles. Mulloy received a production grant and mentorship from Spike Lee.

== Real-life defection ==
While in Miami to promote the film in 2012, actors Anailín de la Rúa de la Torre (Lila) and Javier Nuñez Florián (Elio) disappeared. When they made contact, they indicated they were defecting, requesting political asylum.

== Reception ==
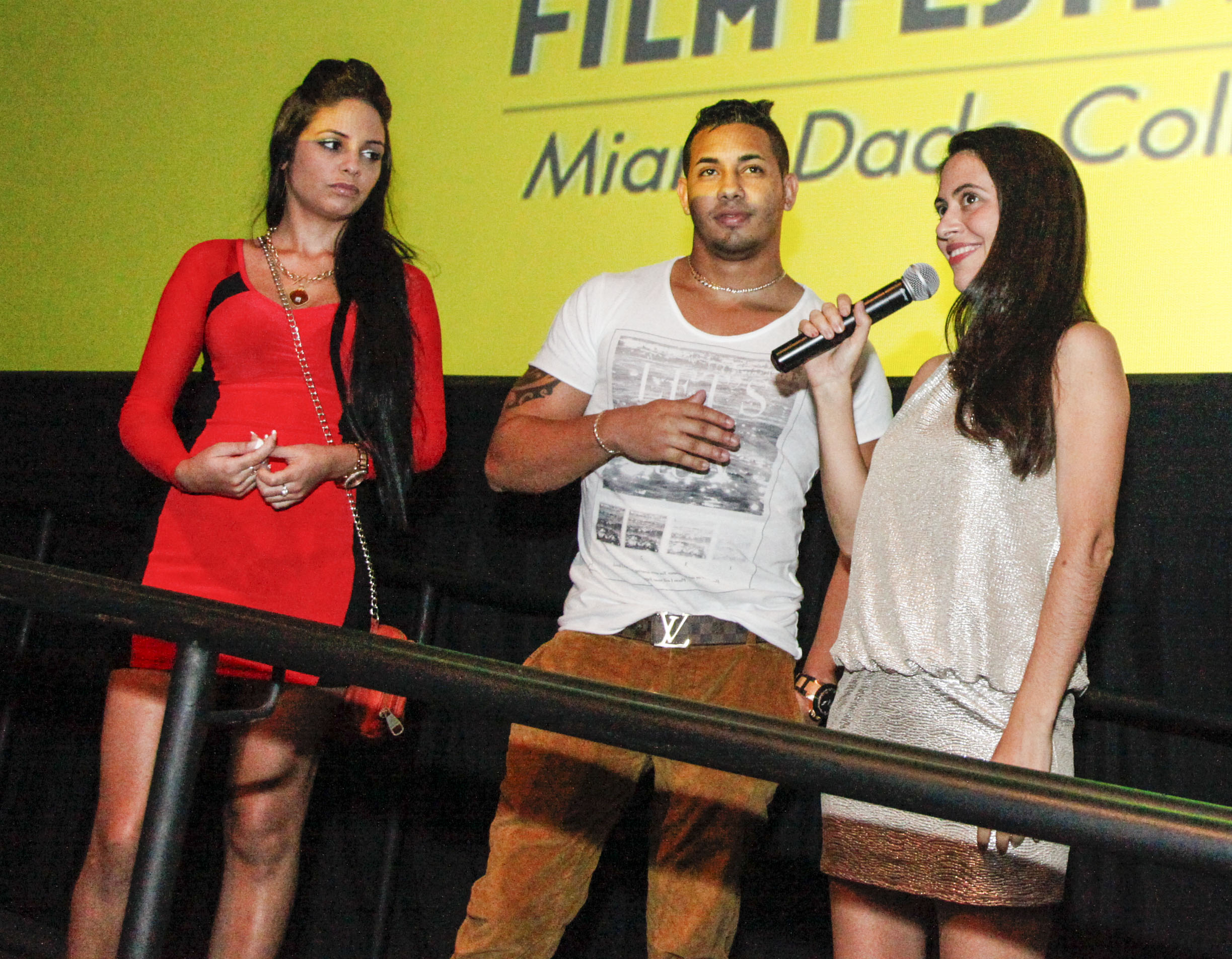
Actors Anailín de la Rúa de la Torre, Javier Núñez Florián and director Lucy Mulloy at the Miami Film Society special event screening of Una noche at the Paragon Coconut Grove in 2013.

Una noche world premiered at the 2012 Berlin International Film Festival in the Generation Competition and had its US premier at the 2012 Tribeca Film Festival. "A pulsing debut feature has an undercurrent of ribald comedy that doesn't entirely prepare the viewer for the harrowing turn it takes."

Una noche shot to international media attention, ahead of its US premiere when two of the film's lead actors, Javier Nuñez Florián and Anailín de la Rúa de la Torre, on their way to present the film at its US premier in Tribeca Film Festival, disappeared, reportedly defecting to the US.

In a highly publicized twist Javier Nuñez Florián and his co-star Dariel Arrechada went on to win the Best Actor Award with Nuñez remaining in hiding during the ensuing media frenzy. "Una Noche cleaned up at Tribeca Film Festival in juried awards, taking home best actor, cinematography, and new director honors in the Narrative competition."

== Accolades ==
In 2010, with Una noche in full production, Mulloy was awarded the Creative Promise Emerging Narrative Award at Tribeca Film Festival. In January 2010 Una noche won the Spike Lee Production Grant Award for film production. Winner 2010 Adrienne Shelly Foundation IFP Director's Grant. Winner 2011 Gotham Award Euphoria Calvin Klein Spotlight on Women Filmmakers’ ‘Live The Dream’ post production grant. Una noche's was at the 2012 Berlin International Film Festival.

In the United States, Una noche premiered at the Tribeca Film Festival and went on to win:

- Tribeca Film Festival Award for Best Director of a Feature Film - Lucy Mulloy
- Tribeca Film Festival Award for Best Actor in a Feature Film - shared between Javier Nuñez Florian and his co-star Dariel Arrechada
- Tribeca Film Festival Award for Best Cinematography of a Feature Film - shared between Shlomo Godder and Trevor Forrest
- Gotham Award Spotlight Award For Women Filmmakers Una noche
- Berlin Film Festival, Nominated for Crystal Bear - Lucy Mulloy
- Berlin Film Festival Nominated for Cinema Fairbindet prize
- Berlin Film Festival Finalist for Teddy Award
- Brasilia International Film Festival Best Script Una noche
- Deauville American Film Festival Grand Jury Prize Una noche
- Athens International Film Festival Best Script Una noche
- Fort Lauderdale International Film Festival Best Foreign Film shared between Lucy Mulloy, Sandy Pérez Aguila, Maite Artieda, Daniel Mulloy, Yunior Santiago Una noche
- Fort Lauderdale International Film Festival Best Director Una noche
- Stockholm International Film Festival Telia Award Una noche
- International Film Festival of India Special Jury Prize Una noche
- Oaxaca Film Festival Best Actor, Javier Nuñez Florian Una noche
- Independent Spirit Awards Best First Feature Nomination, shared between Lucy Mulloy, Sandy Pérez Aguila, Maite Artieda, Daniel Mulloy, Yunior Santiago Una noche
- Independent Spirit Awards Best Editor Nomination, Cindy Lee Una noche
