= Kontora =

2019 Japanese drama mystery film

- コントラ
- Directed by: Anshul Chauhan
- Written by: Anshul Chauhan
- Produced by: Anshul Chauhan
- Starring: Seira Kojima; Wan Marui; Hidemasa Mase
- Cinematography: Maxim Golomidov
- Edited by: Anshul Chauhan
- Music by: Yuma Koda
- Production company: Kowatanda Films
- Release dates: November 25, 2019 (Estonia); March 12, 2020 (Japan)
- Running time: 144 minutes
- Country: Japan
- Language: Japanese

Kontora (コントラ) is a 2019 Japanese drama mystery film written, directed, produced, and edited by Anshul Chauhan that stars Seira Kojima, Wan Marui, and Hidemasa Mase. Kontora is shot in black-and-white. Kontora is Chauhan's second feature film after Bad Poetry Tokyo, preceded by December. Kontora is also the first Japanese film to receive the Grand Prix award at the Tallinn Black Nights Film Festival.

== Plot summary ==
Following her grandfather's (Noriyuki Yamada) WWII-era diary, Sora (Wan Marui) searches for a mysterious treasure in the wilderness of her hometown. Meanwhile, a mysterious mute and backward-walking homeless man (Hidemasa Mase) wanders into town who may be the catalyst to put her shattered relationship with her father (Taichi Yamada) back together.

== Cast ==
- Seira Kojima as Haru
- Wan Marui as Sora
- Hidemasa Mase as the Homeless Man
- Takuzo Shimizu as Haru's father
- Taichi Yamada as Sora's father
- Noriyuki Yamada as Sora's grandfather

== Production ==
After making Bad Poetry Tokyo, director Anshul Chauhan was approached by a producer to write another script after being impressed by his film. Chauhan then took six to seven months to write a script about bullying at the Yokosuka military academy near Tokyo, however, the producer got scared after reading the script and fled as he believed that it was anti-government.

=== Themes and inspiration ===
The plot of Kontora is based on a real story about Chauhan's grandfather, who was a war veteran, that buried and hid things that were discovered after he had died. Chauhan also based the stories in the grandfather's diary around real letters by soldiers.

=== Filming ===
Kontora was shot with a low budget and most scenes where the actors were in a house were shot at Taichi Yamada's house, the actor who plays the father, which is also how he got a role in the film. The film was also mostly shot in Seki, Yamada's hometown.

== Release ==
Kontora had its world premiere at the Tallinn Black Nights Film Festival where it won the Grand Prix for Best Film. Composer Yuma Koda also won the Best Music prize. Kontora also won the Obayashi Prize at Japan Cuts and Best Picture at the Skip City International D-Cinema Festival. Kontora also screened at the Osaka Asian Film Festival.

== Music ==
All tracks are written by Yuma Koda.

No.	Title	Length
1.	"Sora's Theme"	3:47
2.	"Kontora's Walk"	3:09
3.	"Reverse Rivers"	2:38
4.	"Grandpa's Note"	4:32
5.	"First Encounter"	1:27
6.	"Second Encounter"	3:05
7.	"Seeker"	2:20
8.	"Opening the Case"	3:42
9.	"Reverse Rivers – Recomposed"	2:04
10.	"Salvation"	6:21
11.	"An Ending"	4:06
Total length:		37:16

== Reception ==
The film received positive reviews from critics. Kontora has an approval rating of 80% on review aggregator website Rotten Tomatoes, based on 5 reviews. Richard Gray of TheReelBits gave the film a 4.5/5 stars and stated that the film was, "visually striking and often mysterious familial drama doesn’t offer any easy answers, but captivates from the first to last frame." Four Weddings and a Funeral director Mike Newell, stated that Kontora was "brilliantly multi-layered" and "a truly cinematic experience".
