= Tiger (2025 film) =

2025 Japanese LGBT film

- Promotional poster
- Directed by: Anshul Chauhan
- Story by: Anshul Chauhan
- Produced by: Mina Moteki; Michael Carrier
- Starring: Takashi Kawaguchi; Maho Nonami; Kenzo Shirahama; Yuya Endo
- Cinematography: Vinod Vijayasankaran
- Edited by: Anshul Chauhan
- Music by: Tyler Mcbeth; Mora Moth
- Production companies: Kowatanda Films; Tower5 Entertainment
- Distributed by: Free Stone Productions Co., Ltd.
- Release date: 22 September 2025 (Busan)
- Running time: 126 minutes
- Country: Japan
- Language: Japanese

Tiger is a 2025 Japanese drama film written, edited, and directed by Anshul Chauhan that stars Takashi Kawaguchi in the titular role, alongside Maho Nonami, Kenzo Shirahama, and Yuya Endo. It focuses on Japan's LGBTQ+ community, with Kawaguchi portraying 35-year-old gay masseur Taiga Katagiri. Filming took place in September 2024, with post-production completed by early 2025. The film had its world premiere at the 30th Busan International Film Festival in the 'Visions – Asia' section on September 22, 2025.

== Premise ==
Taiga Katagiri is a 35-year-old gay masseur living in Tokyo, Japan. After his father falls sick, his sister urges him to drop his inheritance rights by threatening him that she will reveal his sexuality to others.

== Cast ==
- Takashi Kawaguchi as Taiga Katagiri / Tiger
- Maho Nonami as Minami
- Kenzo Shirahama as Shigeru Katagiri
- Yuya Endo as Koji
- Goro Sato
- Kentez Asaka
- Kosei Kudo
- Masato Mori
- Kei Kotani
- Wataru Narita

== Production and themes ==
Tiger's director Anshul Chauhan had wanted to make a film focused on LGBTQ+ themes and issues, having collected LGBTQ-related stories over the past three years prior to creating the film. Filming for Tiger took place in September 2024; its post-production finished by early 2025. The film's ensemble cast was announced with the start of its filming, with Takashi Kawaguchi playing the lead role alongside Maho Nonami and Yuya Endo; Kawaguchi was previously involved with Chauhan's Bad Poetry Tokyo (2018). Other actors announced include Goro Sato, Kentez Asaka, Kosei Kudo, Masato Mori, Kei Kotani, and Wataru Narita.

The film was written, edited, and directed by Chauhan, produced by Mina Moteki and Michael Carrier, and had its cinematography done by Vinod Vijayasankaran. It focuses on the older LGBTQ+ community in Japan, with its protagonist being a 35-year-old gay masseuse who wants to improve his life in Tokyo. Tiger is Chauhan's fourth feature film.

== Release ==
Tiger had its world premiere at the 30th Busan International Film Festival in the "Visions – Asia" section on September 22, 2025.

It was also screened in International Perspective at the São Paulo International Film Festival on 20 October 2025.

It will be presented in 'Country Focus: Japan - 2025' section of the 56th International Film Festival of India in November 2025.

The film's international sales will be managed by Free Stone Production Co Ltd.

== Accolades ==
The film will compete for the Vision Awards at the 30th Busan International Film Festival.

Award	Date of ceremony	Category	Recipient(s)	Result	Ref.
Busan International Film Festival	September 26, 2025	Hylife Vision Award	Tiger	Won	
