= Anshul Chauhan =

Indian film director (born 1986)

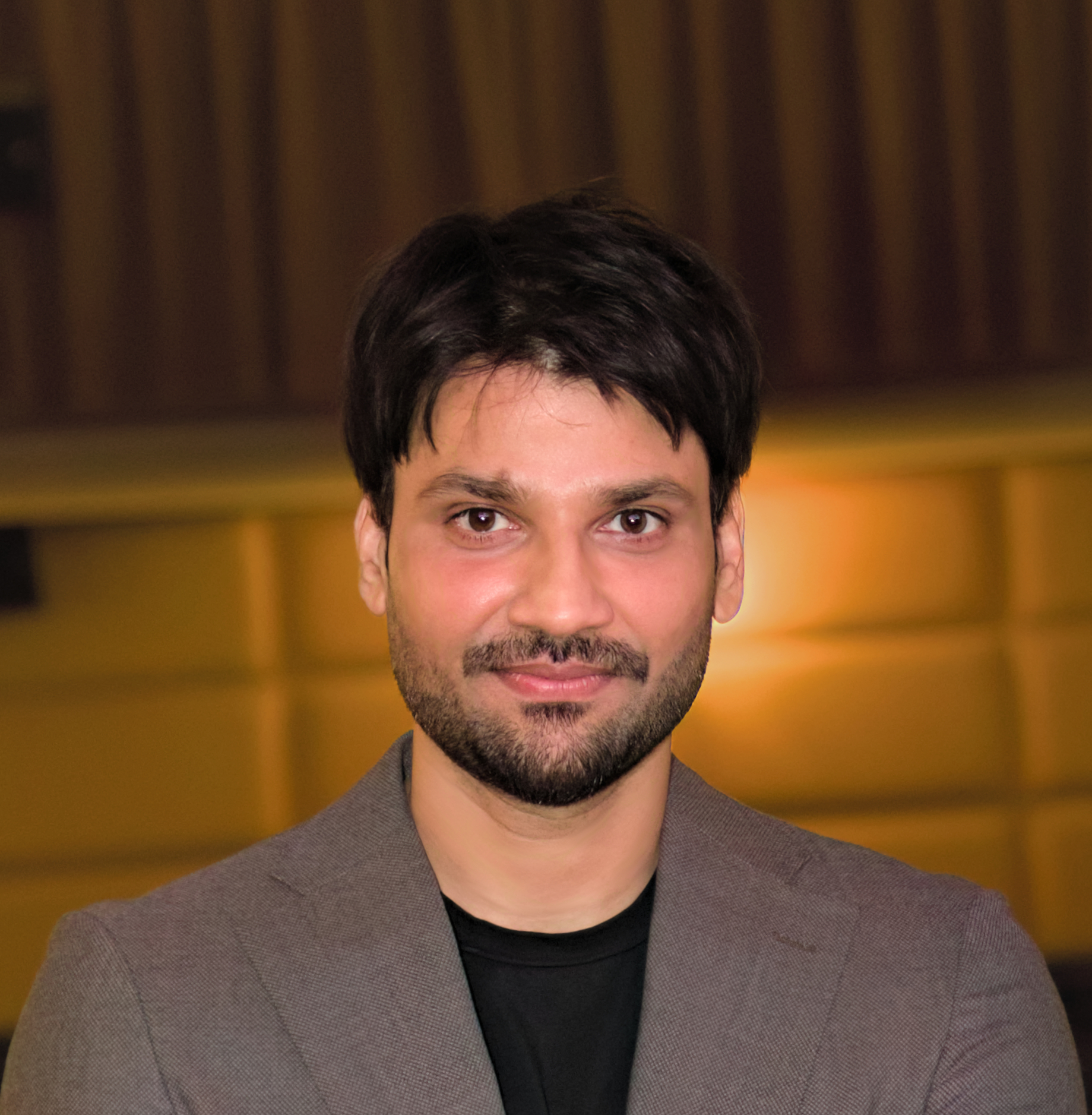
- Chauhan in 2023
- Born: 1986 (age 39–40); Mainpuri, Uttar Pradesh, India
- Education: Rashtriya Military School, Dholpur
- Occupations: Film director; producer; screenwriter; animator
- Notable work: Bad Poetry Tokyo, Kontora, December
- Spouse: Mina Moteki

Anshul Chauhan (born 1986) is an Indian film director, producer, and former animator based in Japan. He is best known for directing films such as December (2022), Kontora (2019), and Bad Poetry Tokyo (2018). Beyond directing, Chauhan has also contributed as an animator to projects such as Final Fantasy XV, Final Fantasy VII Remake, and Tron: Uprising.

== Early life and education ==
Chauhan was born in Mainpuri, Agra, in Northern India in 1986, one day after his grandfather had died. His father was a "strict military man" who schooled Chauhan at a military academy in Rajasthan. Chauhan went to university and studied geography. He later developed an interest in animation and Japanese history after being influenced by his favourite anime, Naruto.

== Career ==
After graduating, Chauhan became an animator in 2006 and animated shows such as BBC's children's show Everything's Rosie and Disney's Tron: Uprising. He was also part of the production of Delhi Safari. After relocating to Tokyo in September 2011, He joined Square Enix and animated for video games such as Final Fantasy XV and Kingdom Hearts III along with animating TV shows such as Transformers: Robots in Disguise.

In 2016, Chauhan founded Kowatanda Films, his own production company, to start directing films. Initially, he only made short films. He later went back to India to direct his first feature film with no intention to return to Japan, however, when he finished, he lost the film due to a faulty hard disk drive. He later moved back to Japan and directed his first feature film, Bad Poetry Tokyo (2018), which won him the Best Narrative Feature Film at the Venice Film Week and the Grand Prize for Best Film at the Brussels Independent Film Festival.

After making Bad Poetry Tokyo, Chauhan was approached by a producer who asked him to write another script after being impressed by his film. Chauhan spent six to seven months writing a script about bullying at a Yokosuka military academy. However, the producer got scared and left after reading it, considering it to be anti-government. After this, Chauhan wrote his second feature film, Kontora (2019), which was the first Japanese release to win the Grand Prix Award for Best Film at the Tallinn Black Nights Film Festival. He stated that his inspiration for Kontora was from war diaries of Japanese soldiers.

In 2022, Chauhan directed his third feature film, December (2022), featuring Shogen of Brillante Mendoza’s Gensan Punch. Production on the courtroom drama film began in February in Tokyo, and focused on a separated couple reuniting after the murderer of their daughter is given a retrial. December was nominated for the Kim Jiseok award at the 27th Busan International Film Festival. In 2024, he announced that he was working on a new film titled Tiger, which would star Takashi Kawaguchi, Maho Nonami, and Yuya Endo, that was planned to be released in 2025. In September 2025, Tiger had its international premiere at the 30th Busan International Film Festival. It features LGBTQ+ themes and is his fourth film to be set in Japan. It won the Hylife Vision Award at Busan in the "Visions – Asia" category.

In November 2025, Chauhan established Kowatanda Films India, an Indian branch of his production company; it is run by Chauhan, Mina Moteki, and Sohrab Bozorgchami. Kowatanda Films India will collaborate with actress Shweta Tripathi and her production company Bandarful Films on Nava, a horror film. It will be his first film in India.

== Filmography ==
=== Film ===
==== As director and producer ====
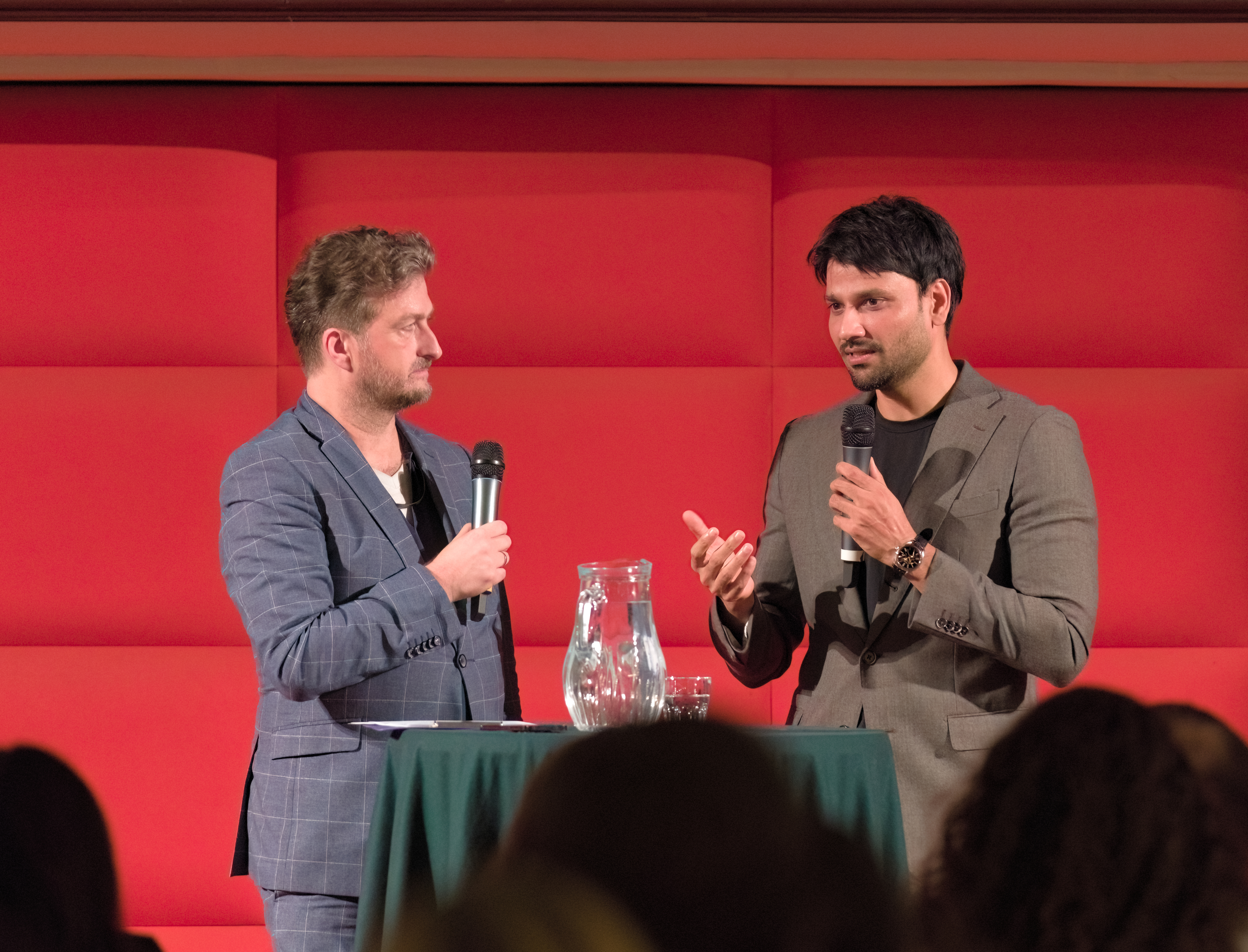
Chauhan in an interview at the JAPANNUAL 2023 film festival for his feature film December

| Year | Title | Notes | Refs. |
|---|---|---|---|
| 2012 | Tokyo Apple | Short film | |
| 2016 | Soap | Short film | |
| 2016 | What's Left of Us | Short film | |
| 2017 | Kawaguchi 4256 | Short film | |
| 2018 | Bad Poetry Tokyo | Feature film | |
| 2019 | Kontora | Feature film | |
| 2021 | Leo's Return | Short film | |
| 2022 | December | Feature film | |
| 2025 | Tiger | Feature film | |

==== As animator ====
| Year | Title | Notes | Refs. |
|---|---|---|---|
| 2011 | Lego Hero Factory: Savage Planet | Animator | |
| 2012 | Delhi Safari | Animator | |
| 2012 | Gladiators of Rome | Animator | |
| 2015 | Guardians of Oz | Animator | |
| 2016 | Kingsglaive: Final Fantasy XV | Animator | |
| 2016 | Gantz: O | Animator | |

=== Television ===
==== As animator ====
| Year | Title | Notes | Refs. |
|---|---|---|---|
| 2007–08 | Back at the Backyard | Animator; 5 episodes | |
| 2008 | FarmKids | Animator; 4 episodes | |
| 2011 | Everything's Rosie | Lead animator; 26 episodes | |
| 2012 | Care Bears: Welcome to Care-a-Lot | Animator; 26 episodes | |
| 2012 | Tron: Uprising | Animator; 15 episodes | |
| 2013 | Pac-Man and the Ghostly Adventures | Animator; 11 episodes | |
| 2014–15 | Transformers: Robots in Disguise | Animator; layout artist; 12 episodes | |
| 2018 | Record of Grancrest War | Animator; 3 episodes | |

=== Video games ===
| Year | Title | Notes | Refs. |
|---|---|---|---|
| 2012 | UFC Undisputed 3 | Animator | |
| 2012 | Skylanders: Giants | Animator | |
| 2016 | Final Fantasy XV | Animator | |
| 2019 | Kingdom Hearts III | Animator | |
| 2020 | Final Fantasy VII Remake | Animator | |
