= Japannual =

Annual film festival with Japanese films held in Vienna, Austria

JAPANNUAL
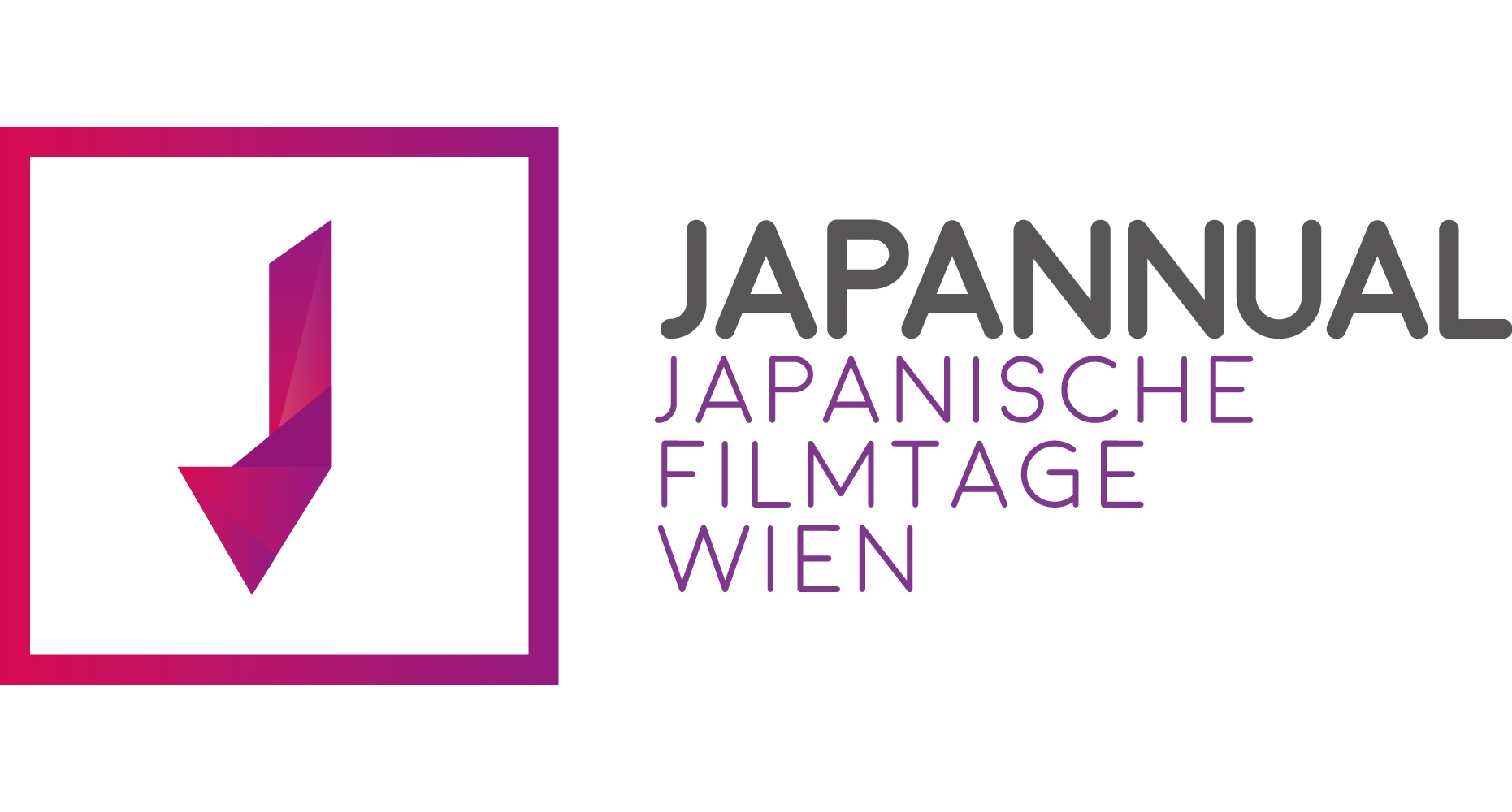

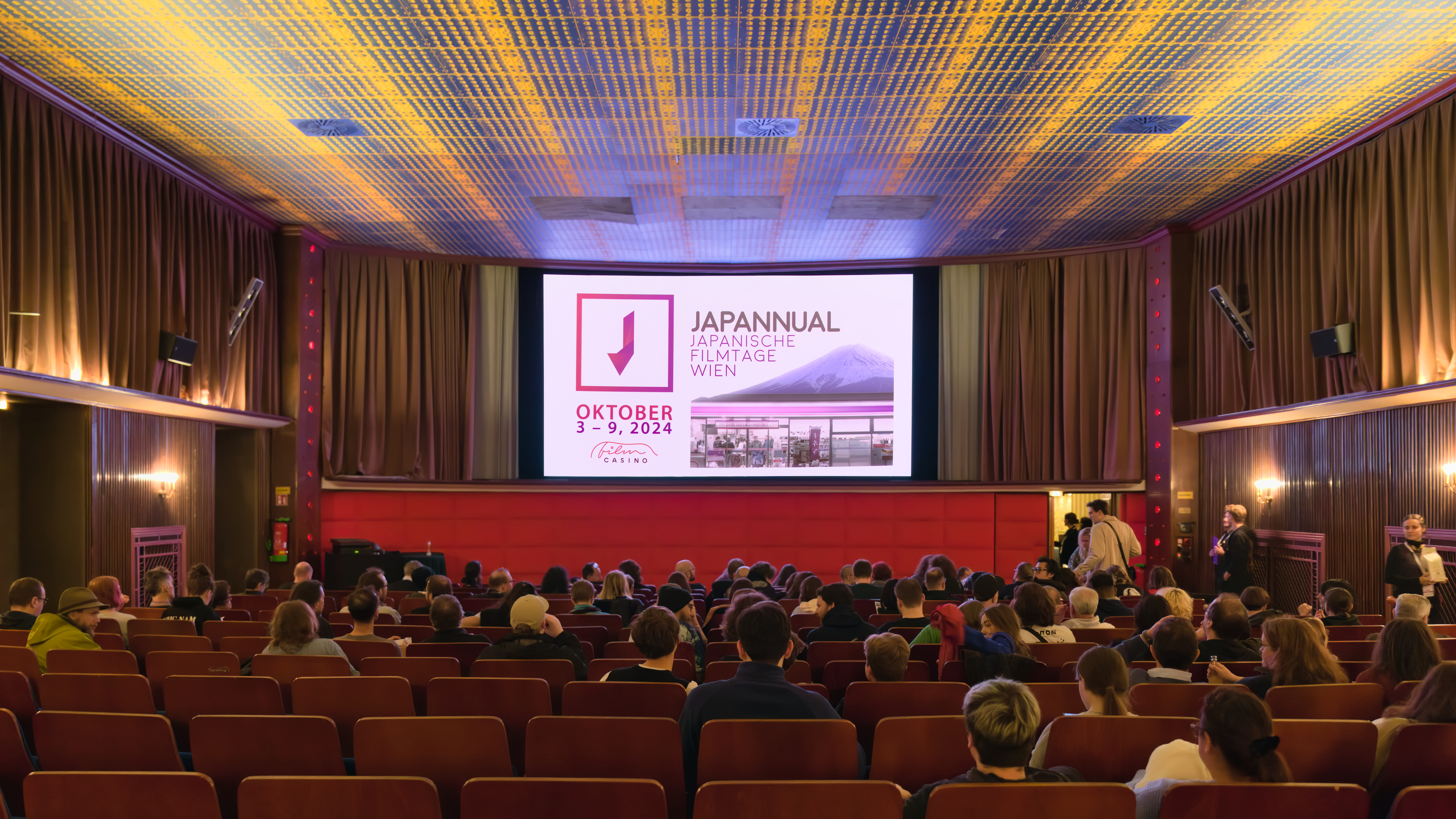
- Presentation of JAPANNUAL 2024 at the Filmcasino
- Location: Vienna, Austria
- Founded: 2 October 2017; 9 years ago
- Most recent: 2026
- Awards: Japannual Audience Award
- Festival date: Opening: 8 October 2026; Closing: 15 October 2026
- Language: Japanese
- Website: JAPANNUAL

Japannual (stylised JAPANNUAL), also known as the Japanese Film Days Vienna, (German: Japanische Filmtage Wien) is a film festival dedicated to films produced in Japan. Since 2017, the festival has been held annually in early October at the Filmcasino cinema in Vienna, Austria.

== History ==
The first edition of Japannual opened on 2 October 2017, screening eleven films over the course of four days. In subsequent years, between 26 and 29 films were shown over five to seven days, with the festival being held over seven days every year from 2022 onwards. In 2026, an additional eighth day was added, featuring three old or classic films of Japanese origin and a documentary about a director of that era, bringing the total number of films screened that year to 33. From 2017 to 2025, all festival screenings took place exclusively at Filmcasino. In 2026, the additional screening day was held at Filmhaus am Spittelberg. The festival is organised by the Austrian-Japanese Society (German: Österreichisch-Japanische Gesellschaft, ÖJG).

The Japannual itself is a member of the Forum of Austrian Film Festivals (German: Forum Österreichischer Filmfestivals), an association of Austrian film festivals whose objective is to improve the overall funding and support framework for film festivals in Austria.

== Program ==
Japannual's programme features works representing all genres and styles of the Japanese film industry. Alongside dramas, comedies, action films, anime, documentaries, and horror films from more traditional mainstream production, the festival also presents avant-garde films and works by emerging filmmakers. With its exclusive focus on Japanese cinema, Japannual is comparable to Germany's Nippon Connection film festival.

The films screened are generally selected from productions released during the previous year. Each edition typically includes a special festival section devoted to the broader body of work of a single, established director, showcasing several films from different periods of their career. Most screenings contain feature-length films with running times ranging from approximately 60 to 150 minutes. Director-focused retrospectives may also include a selection of short films with a running time of around 15 minutes alongside feature-length works.

All films are screened in their original Japanese language version with English subtitles.

The programme also includes winners and selections from Japanese film festivals such as the Pia Film Festival, which is dedicated to discovering and promoting emerging filmmaking talent. For selected screenings, JAPANNUAL collaborates with the /slash and the Red Lotus film festival, presenting Japanese productions that previously screened at those festivals.

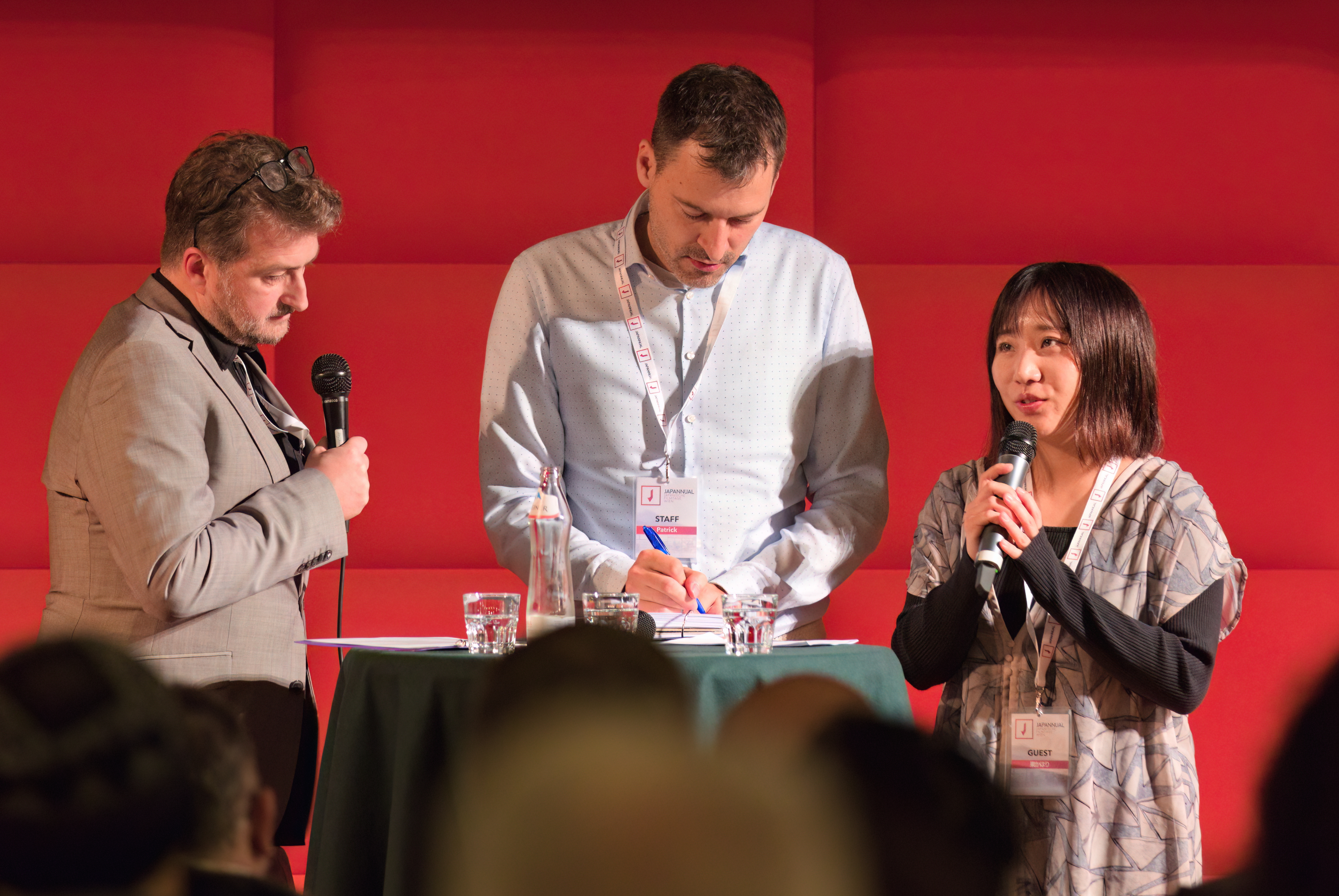
Director Kahori Higashi during a post-screening interview about her film Memories of His Scent

Selected screenings are accompanied by guest appearances from the films' directors. Following the screening, a moderator interviews the filmmaker about the film's themes, the significance of individual scenes, and the creative motivations behind the work. Afterwards, members of the audience are invited to ask the director their own questions. The invited filmmakers are not limited to Japanese directors. For example, Indian director Anshul Chauhan and Filipino director Janus Victoria have attended the festival to present their films December and Diamonds in the Sand, respectively.

In addition to its film program, Japannual offers a cultural programme introducing various aspects of Japanese culture, individual cultural artefacts, and artists with connections to Japan. Lectures and presentations have covered topics such as geisha (geiko) culture, the board game Go, the similarities and distinctive features of Japanese ghost stories, the repair technique kintsugi, manga, junrei (pilgrimages), Japanese calligraphy (shodō), and the textile dyeing technique yūzen, as well as Japanese food products including miso, rice, and sake.

== Award ==
After the conclusion of each festival, the Japannual Audience Award is awarded to one film. Immediately after each screening, audience members have the opportunity to rate the film using a voting card, awarding between one and five stars. As attendance varies from screening to screening, the number of votes cast differs for each film.

The Audience Award winners have been:

- 2017 – Close-Knit, directed by Naoko Ogigami
- 2018 – One Cut of the Dead, directed by Shin'ichirō Ueda
- 2019 – Fly Me to the Saitama, directed by Hideki Takeuchi
- 2020 – Daughters, directed by Hajime Tsuda
- 2021 – Midnight Swan, directed by Eiji Uchida
- 2022 – Sabakan, directed by Tomoki Kanazawa
- 2023 – Fly Me To The Saitama: From Biwa Lake With Love, directed by Hideki Takeuchi
- 2024 – Black Box Diaries, directed by Shiori Itō
- 2025 – Kokuhō, directed by Sang-il Lee
- 2026 – Fujiko directed by Taichi Kimura
