= December (2022 film) =

- Theatrical release poster
- Directed by: Anshul Chauhan
- Screenplay by: Rand Cotler; Mina Moteki
- Story by: Anshul Chauhan
- Produced by: Anshul Chauhan; Mina Moteki; Takahiro Yamashita
- Starring: Shogen; Megumi; Ryō Matsuura
- Cinematography: Peter Moen Jensen
- Edited by: Anshul Chauhan
- Music by: Yuma Koda
- Production companies: Kowatanda Films; Yaman Films
- Release date: 7 October 2022 (Busan)
- Running time: 99 minutes
- Country: Japan
- Language: Japanese

December (赦し, Yurushi) is a 2022 Japanese legal drama film directed by Anshul Chauhan that stars Shogen, Megumi, and Ryō Matsuura. The film follows the subject of juvenile offenders and a girl who gets a retrial after being sentenced to life in prison for a murder she committed at the age of seventeen.

== Cast ==
- Shogen as Emi's father and Sumiko's ex-husband, Katsu
- Megumi as Emi's mother and Katsu's ex-wife, Sumiko
- Ryō Matsuura as Kana Fukuda
- Shingo Fujimori
- Takashi Kawaguchi
- Tôru Kizu as Takumi Sato, Kana's lawyer
- Kanon Narumi as Emi Higuchi
- Takuzo Shimizu
- Miki Maya

== Production ==
December began production in Tokyo and was shot in Japan's Kanagawa and Ibaraki prefectures.

== Release ==
December was nominated for the Grand Prix Award for Best Film at the Osaka Asian Film Festival and the Kim Jiseok Award at the 27th Busan International Film Festival.

SC Films International helped to distribute the film internationally.

== Reception ==
Panos Kotzathanasis of Asian Movie Pulse praised the film stating that, "December is an excellent film that works on a number of levels and [is] definitely Chauhan's best as of yet." Simon Crowe, an executive producer of December, stated that, “After a wave of Scandinavia programming, and now most recently Korean films and television with Parasite, Snowpiercer, Train To Busan and record-breaking series Squid Game, we believe Japanese programming could be the next big thing. Not just anime, but film and television after Drive My Car, Gensan Punch, and now December.”

Roxy Simons of View of the Arts rated the film a 4 out of 5 and stated that, "December is a human drama, and so much of the emotional strife that viewers feel is a result of the pain depicted by the film’s main trio."

Emma Steen of Time Out Tokyo stated that, "As for the production itself, Chauhan's latest cinematic work is a courtroom drama that is not only exquisitely filmed – courtesy of Peter Jensen’s cinematography – but also captivates the audience as it grapples with the fine line between justice and revenge."

Richard Gray of The Reel Bits rated the film a 4 out of 5, stating that, "Anshul Chauhan delivers another understated character study, which works in part due to the stellar performances and a measured understanding of the tensions that lay just beneath the surface of human interaction."
