= Tallinn Black Nights Film Festival =

Film festival in Tallinn, Estonia

Black Nights Film Festival
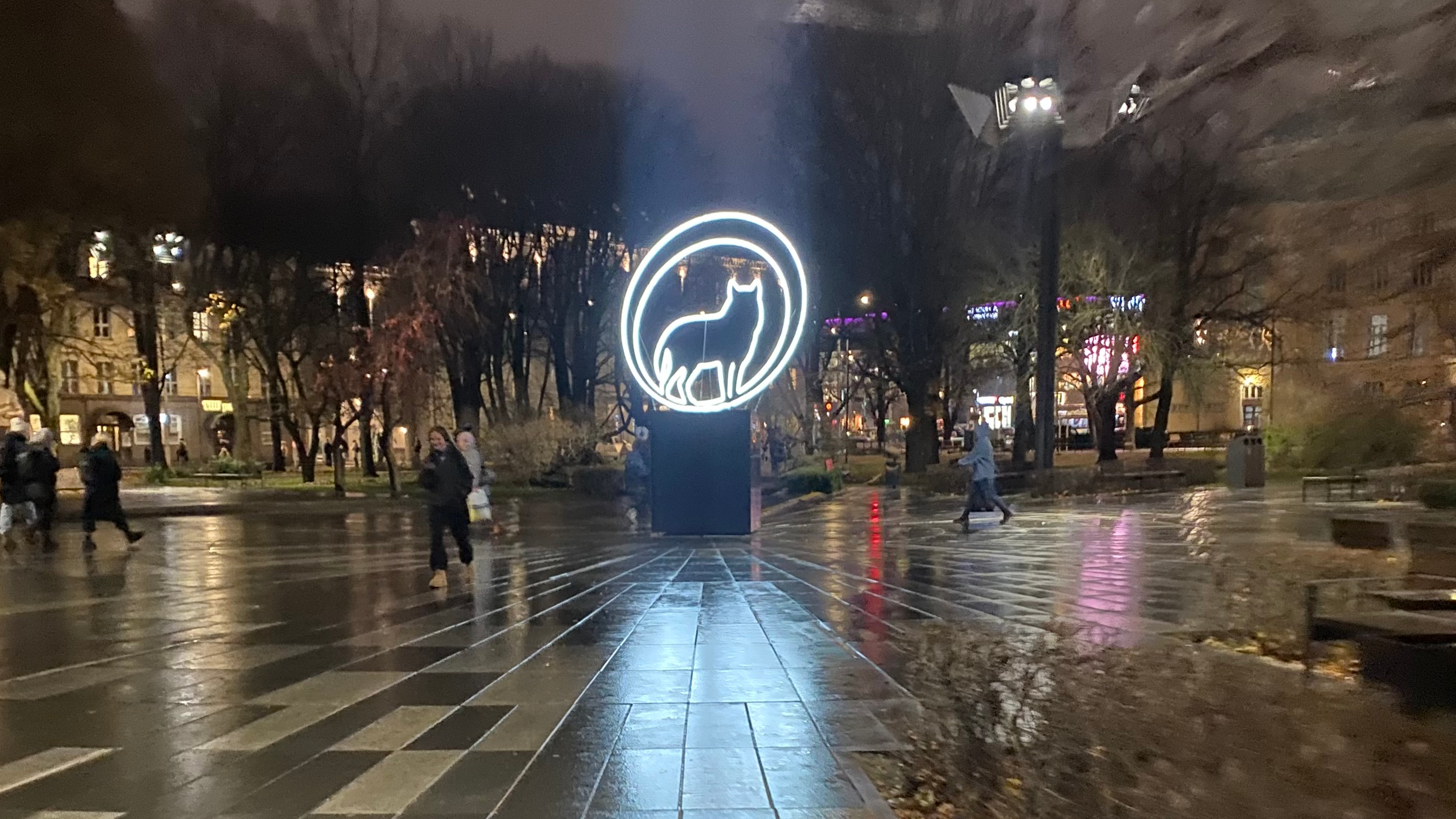
- Location: Tallinn, Estonia
- Founded: 1997
- Founded by: Tiina Lokk-Tramberg
- Awards: Golden Wolf/Wolf
- Directors: Tiina Lokk-Tramberg
- Festival date: Opening: 6 November 2026; Closing: 20 November 2026
- Website: poff.ee/en/

Tallinn Black Nights Film Festival (BNFF), or PÖFF (Pimedate Ööde filmifestival), is an annual film festival held since 1997 in Tallinn, the capital city of Estonia. PÖFF is one of the largest film festivals in Northern Europe. In 2014, it was upgraded to an A-list festival by FIAPF.

PÖFF includes two sub-festivals that take part concurrently with the main program: Children's and Youth Film Festival Just Film, and PÖFF Shorts. Running concurrently with the festival is Industry@Tallinn & Baltic Event Co-Production Market, the biggest audiovisual industry meeting in the region.

PÖFF also manages two off-season events: the Haapsalu Horror and Fantasy Film Festival taking place every April and Tartu Love Film Festival Tartuff, taking place in August.

== History ==
The festival was founded in 1997 on the initiative of Tiina Lokk. Lokk graduated from the Russian State Institute of Cinematography in Moscow, worked for many years as a journalist for various publications, and since 1992 was a special correspondent at the Berlin and Cannes Film Festival. Using her experience in the film industry, she decided to try to make a festival in Estonia, although in her own words she was not sure of success.

Starting with 4,500 attendances and a 25-films program in 1997, PÖFF was originally primarily a showcase for Nordic films. By the FIAPF classification, it was a Eurasian festival and did not have the right to put together competitions without any borders, neither geographical nor by topic. However, the festival was growing fast and attracted bigger audience, already in its 5th season it launched an industry section.

In 2010, PÖFF hosted the European Film Awards. The programme of the XVI season of PÖFF in 2012 already included 270 feature films from 66 countries.

As a result of its rapid growth, PÖFF was recognized by FIAPF and upgraded to an A-list festival in 2014, making it the first festival in Northern Europe to gain a Competitive Feature Film Festival accreditation, joining only 14 other major world festivals including Berlin, Cannes, Venice, Karlovy Vary, Warsaw, and San Sebastian.

In 2015, the festival reached an audience of 80,000, the 19th edition featured 289 films from 80 countries; the events spanned two cities – Tallinn and Tartu. In addition to the main programmes, the festival included the Animated Dreams animation film festival, the Just Film festival for children and young people, and the Sleepwalkers international short film festival. In the same year, PÖFF also launched the first Tridens First Features, a competition programme dedicated to feature-length debuts by young directors.

PÖFF film school, an online film education platform for Estonian public school students, was launched in 2021. Other initiatives launched during the COVID-19 pandemic include the Discovery Campus for young filmmakers, and the Creative Gate, a database for professionals from the regions. That same year, Variety magazine included the festival's director Tiina Lokk in its list of the 50 most influential women in the global film industry, highlighting the way she managed to lead PÖFF amidst the COVID-19 pandemic.

In 2022, the programme of the 26th Festival featured 550 films from 75 countries, including 78 world premieres. In the same year, PÖFF added a fifth competition programme, Critics' Choice. Also since 2022, it is a partner of the Belarusian film festival in exile Northern Lights, whose programme is partly held at the PÖFF venues in Tallinn.

The PÖFF-2024 programme included 185 films from 73 countries, the Children's and Youth Film sub-festival with 51 films and the Short Film sub-festival with 240 films. In 2024, the Festival launched the sixth competition – Doc@PÖFF for documentaries.

The 29th Tallinn Black Nights Film Festival (PÖFF), took place from 7 to 23 November 2025. In Doc@PÖFF International Competition the following films were selected:

- Far Away – Tayfur Aydın (Turkey)
- The Feast of the Wolf – Jadran *Boban (Croatia, Serbia)
- It’s Winter – Sajad Imani (Iran, France)
- Edge of the Night – Vladimir Loginov (Estonia)
- Goodbye Sisters – Alexander Murphy (France, Nepal)
- One Day I Wish to See You Happy – Maryna Nikolcheva (Ukraine, France)
- Days of Wonder – Karin Pennanen (Finland)
- Electing Ms Santa – Raisa Răzmeriță (Moldova, Romania)
- Miss Jobson – Amanda Sans Pantling (Jamaica, Spain)
- The Lunch: A Letter to America – Gianluca Vassallo (Italy, USA)

The 30th anniversary edition of the festival will take place from 6 to 22 November 2026. It will open with 2026 biographical drama film Ulya directed by Viestur Kairish.

== Structure ==
=== Focus ===
Each year the festival chooses a particular country or region whose cinema becomes the central theme of the season. For example, in 2012 the focus country was Greece, in 2014 – Poland, in 2017 – Flanders, Belgium, in 2021 – Hungary, in 2022 – Germany, in 2023 – Serbia, etc.

=== Events ===
The film festival consists of a main programme, 16 special programmes, three sub-festivals and a film market.

Main Programme:

- EurAsia International Competition Programme;
- debut feature film competition programme;
- Baltic States film competition programme;
- Rebels with a Cause;
- Critics’ Choice;
- Doc@POFF.

PÖFF's programme also includes screenings of documentaries and retrospectives dedicated to specific genres and filmmakers. In addition to the main competition programme, PÖFF includes:

- Student and Short Film Festival Sleepwalkers;
- Animated Dreams Film Festival;
- Just Film Children's and Youth Film Festival;
- Black Market Industry Screenings – a film market focused on films from the Baltic States, Nordic countries, Central and Eastern Europe, Russia and Central Asia. It also hosts Film from Book copyright market;
- Film and Co-production Market Baltic Event, dedicated to connection of the international film and television professionals and promotion of the Baltic States cinema.

Tallinn Black Nights' industry program, consisting of the Industry@Tallinn industry summit and the Baltic Event Regional Co-Production Film Market, is a platform aiming to connect filmmakers and their projects with producers and sales agents.

PÖFF's non-competitive programme includes Fashion Cinema, the Gourmet Cinema, the Midnight Shivers, experimental cinema section, and a separate section on sports cinema (in cooperation with the Estonian Olympic Committee).

The festival also organizes two smaller off-season events: the only genre film event in the Baltic countries the Haapsalu Horror and Fantasy Film Festival which takes place in April every year and Tartu Love Film Festival Tartuff, in August.

The sections are judged by several international juries. Apart from the main competition, separate jury panels are nominated by the FIPRESCI, NETPAC, and the International Federation of Film Clubs (FICC). In 2014, the festival introduced an ecumenical jury, which brings together representatives of Estonian churches and selects a film from the main competition programme that ‘most clearly represents human dignity and agape’.

== Awards ==
The winner of the Black Nights Film Festival's main competition programme receives the Grand Prix – the Bronze Wolf statuette – and a cash prize of 5,000 euros. In the Best Estonian Film competition, the winner receives a prize grant of 3,200 euros. Two Special Jury Prizes are also awarded each season.

=== The First Feature Competition ===
- Best Film Award

Year	Film	Original Title	Director(s)	Nationality of Director
2016	Holy Biker	Reza a Lenda	Homero Olivetto	Brazil
2017	The Marriage	Martesa	Blerta Zeqiri	Kosovo
2018	Head Above Water	Marche ou crève	Margaux Bonhomme	France
2019	Stories from the Chestnut Woods	Zgodbe iz kostanjevih gozdov	Gregor Božič	Slovenia
2020	Great Happiness	Ji le dian	Yi-ao Wang	China
2021	Other Cannibals	Altri Canniballi	Francesco Sossai	Italy
2022	The Land Within	The Land Within	Fisnik Maxville	Switzerland, Kosovo
2023	The Moon Is Upside Down	The Moon Is Upside Down	Loren Taylor	New Zealand
2024	No Dogs Allowed	No Dogs Allowed	Steve Bache	Germany
2025	Hercules Falling	Herkules Falder	Christian Bonke	Denmark

=== The Baltic Film Competition ===
- Best Baltic Film

Year	Film	Original Title	Director(s)	Nationality of Director
2022	The Poet	Poetas	Giedrius Tamosevicius and Vytautas V. Landsbergis	Lithuania
2023	Smoke Sauna Sisterhood	Savvusanna sõsarad	Anna Hints	Estonia
2024	The Southern Chronicles	Pietinia Kronikas	Ignas Miškinis	Lithuania
2025	The Visitor	Svečias	Vytautas Katkus	Lithuania

=== Grand Prix winners ===
Year	Film	Original Title	Director(s)	Nationality of Director
2004	Shiza	Shiza / Шиза	Gulshat Omarova	Kazakhstan
2005	Shanghai Dreams	Qīng hóng / 青紅	Wang Xiaoshuai	China
2006	Dark Blue Almost Black	Azuloscurocasinegro	Daniel Sánchez Arévalo	Spain
2007	Takva: A Man's Fear of God	Takva	Özer Kızıltan	Turkey
2008	Hunger	Hunger	Steve McQueen	United Kingdom
2009	Ajami	Ajami / عجمي / עג'מי	Scandar Copti	Israel
2009	Ajami	Ajami / عجمي / עג'מי	Yaron Shani	Israel
2010	My Joy	Schastye moyo / Счастье моё	Sergei Loznitsa	Ukraine
2011	A Simple Life	Táo Jiě / 桃姐	Ann Hui	Hong Kong
2012	House with a Turret	Dom s bashenkoy / Дом с башенкой	Eva Neymann	Ukraine
2013	The Great Beauty	La grande bellezza	Paolo Sorrentino	Italy
2014	Lucifer	Lucifer	Gust Van den Berghe	Belgium
2015	The Throne	Sado / 사도	Lee Joon-ik	South Korea
2016	A Quiet Heart	Lev shaket / לב שקט מאוד	Eitan Anner	Israel
2017	Night Accident	Tunku Kyrsyk	Temirbek Birnazarov	Kyrgyzstan
2018	Wandering Girl	Niña Errante	Rubén Mendoza	Colombia
2019	Kontora	コントラ	Anshul Chauhan	Japan
2020	Fear	Страх	Ivaylo Hristov	Bulgaria
2021	Dear Thomas	Lieber Thomas	Andreas Kleinert	Germany
2022	Driving Mum	Á Ferð með Mömmu	Hilmar Oddsson	Iceland
2023	Misericordia	Misericordia	Emma Dante	Italy
2024	Silent City Driver	Чимээгүй хотын жолооч	Sengedorj Janchivdorj	Mongolia
2025	The Good Daughter	La buena hija	Júlia de Paz Solvas	Catalonia/Spain
