= Poetas =

Poetas (The Poet) is a 2022 Lithuanian film, based on the true stories of Kostas Kubilinskas and Kazys Skinkys. It was written and directed by Giedrius Tamoševičius and Vytautas V. Landsbergis, and stars Donatas Želvys. The part won Želvys the Silver Crane award for best actor.

== Plot ==
In 1947, the poet Kostas Skinkys arrives at a remote village primary school. He has been sent there by the Soviet authorities for his anti-Soviet poems. He now writes poetry in praise of Lenin, which is recited by the school children. He meets his old friend Jule, and shows her his new secret poems against the Soviet occupation. She takes him to the Lithuanian partisans, who are critical of his public support for the regime. The leader of the partisans, Tauras, urges Kostas to write hopeful poems, as well as satirical poems against the Soviet regime.

Kostas attends a writers summit in the city. He is berated by the local commissar, who is aware of his meetings with the partisans, and asks for names and locations.

In the forest, Kostas attends a meeting of the partisans. He mentions his meeting with the Soviet authorities, but claims he did not give them any information. After a party, they are attacked by Soviet troops. Kostas and Tauras flee to a forest bunker, where they avoid Soviet troops for two days. Then Kostas shoots Tauras and returns to the town. He reveals himself to the troops as a Soviet agent.

He returns to Jule, saying they can start a new life in the city, but she shoots herself.

== Production ==
Principal photography started on 11 June 2021 and lasted for one month, mainly in Vilnius and the Anykščiai region. The production received €475,000 or €600,000 from the Lithuanian Film Center, and crowd-funded €17,500.

== Awards ==
- Tallinn Black Nights Film Festival 2022, Best Baltic Film
