= Kostas Kubilinskas =

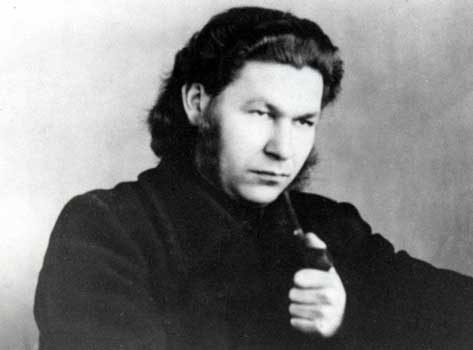
Kostas Kubilinskas

Kostas Kubilinskas (1 July 1923 in Vilkaviškis district – 9 March 1962 near Moscow) was a Lithuanian poet known for his writing for children. Amongst his books is The Frog Queen, a 1974 collection of children's poetry illustrated by Algirdas Steponavičius and translated into English by Avril Pyman.

According to the Genocide and Resistance Research Centre of Lithuania, Kubilinskas served as a spy for the MGB so that his poems (seen as "ideologically incorrect" by the Soviet government) could be published. The centre's report alleges that during his time there he murdered Benediktas Labėnas, leader of the Šarūnas group of the Lithuanian partisan Dainava military district. A total of 15 Lithuanian freedom fighters died because of Kubilinskas' betrayal.

In 2007 his poem The Wolf with a Frozen Tail was adapted into an animated film directed by Rasa Joni, The Tail.

The 2022 film The Poet is based on his life.
