= Mississippi Masala =

1991 film by Mira Nair

- Theatrical release poster
- Directed by: Mira Nair
- Written by: Sooni Taraporevala
- Produced by: Mira Nair; Mitch Epstein
- Starring: Denzel Washington; Roshan Seth; Sarita Choudhury; Charles S. Dutton; Joe Seneca
- Cinematography: Edward Lachman
- Edited by: Roberto Silvi
- Music by: L. Subramaniam
- Production companies: Mirabai Films; Studio Canal Souss
- Distributed by: Palace Pictures (United Kingdom); Cinecom Pictures; The Samuel Goldwyn Company (United States)
- Release date: September 18, 1991; (France)
- Running time: 118 minutes
- Countries: United Kingdom; United States
- Language: English
- Budget: $5 million
- Box office: $7.3 million

Mississippi Masala is a 1991 romantic drama film directed by Mira Nair, based upon a screenplay by Sooni Taraporevala, starring Denzel Washington, Sarita Choudhury, and Roshan Seth. Set primarily in rural Mississippi, the film explores an interracial romance between an African-American man and an Indian-American woman.

The film was released in late 1991 and early 1992, and grossed over $7million USD at the box office. It was made a part of The Criterion Collection on May 24, 2022.

== Plot ==
In 1972, dictator Idi Amin enacts a policy of forceful expulsion of Asians from Uganda. Jay, his wife Kinnu, and their daughter Mina, a family of Ugandan Indians residing in Kampala, reluctantly and tearfully leave their home behind and relocate. After spending a few years in England, the family settles in Greenwood, Mississippi, to live with extended family members who own a chain of motels there. Despite the passage of time, Jay is unable to come to terms with his sudden departure from his home country, and cannot fully embrace the American lifestyle. He dreams of one day returning with his family to Kampala. The effects of Amin's dictatorship have caused Jay to become distrustful of black people.

Mina, on the other hand, has fully acclimated to American culture and has a diverse group of friends. She feels stifled by her parents' wish to only associate with members of their own community. She falls in love with Demetrius Williams, a local African-American self-employed carpet cleaner. Mina is aware that her parents will not approve and keeps the relationship somewhat secret. The pair agree to spend a romantic clandestine weekend together in Biloxi, where they are spotted by members of the Indian community, and the gossip begins to spread. Mina's brother attacks Demetrius and in the confusion, he is arrested and charged with assault, but gets bailed out by his brother Tyrone. Jay is outraged and ashamed, and forbids Mina from ever seeing Demetrius again. Mina also faces both subtle and outright dislike from Demetrius's community. Demetrius confronts Jay, who reveals his experiences and racist treatment in Uganda, causing Demetrius to call out Jay on his hypocrisy. Ultimately, the two families cannot fully come to terms with the interracial pair, who flee the state together in Demetrius's van.

Jay's wish finally becomes reality when he travels to Kampala to attend a court proceeding on the dispossession of his previously confiscated house. While in the country however, he sees how much it has changed and realizes that he no longer identifies with the land of his birth. Jay returns to America and relinquishes his long-nurtured dream of returning to Uganda, the place he considered home. But before he returns home, he makes peace with the black community, holding the toddler of a random Ugandan at a street performance.

== Cast ==
- Denzel Washington as Demetrius Williams
- Sarita Choudhury as Mina
  - Sahira Nair as young Mina
- Roshan Seth as Jay
- Sharmila Tagore as Kinnu
- Charles S. Dutton as Tyrone Williams
- Joe Seneca as Williben Williams
- Ranjit Chowdhry as Anil
- Mohan Gokhale as Pontiac
- Konga Mbadu as Okelo
- Mohan Agashe as Kanti Napkin
- Tico Wells as Dexter Williams
- Yvette Hawkins as Aunt Rose
- Anjan Srivastav as Jammubhai (as Anjan Srivastava)
- Natalie Oliver-Atherton as Alicia LeShay (as Natalie Oliver)
- Mira Nair as Gossip 1
- Rajika Puri as Gossip 2
- Richard Crick as Hotel Customer
- Michael Wawuyo as Soldier on Bus
- Joseph Olita as Idi Amin

== Production ==
The script was written in Brooklyn, New York, after research by Nair, Taraporevala, and their team in Mississippi and Kampala. During research in Mississippi, Nair met a carpet cleaner named Demetrius and decided to model the main character after him. Ben Kingsley was originally cast in the role of Mina's father, but he eventually withdrew from the project, prompting the original backers of the film to pull out. Nair was able to gain new funding after Denzel Washington was chosen for the role of Demetrius. She later mentioned she faced substantial pressure from potential backers to select white leads rather than Indians or African Americans. The Mississippi-based scenes were filmed in Mississippi, in the towns of Greenwood, Grenada, Biloxi, and Ocean Springs. The Uganda scenes were filmed in Kampala, Uganda, including in Nair's home. Though the Monte Cristo motel was an existing business chosen by Nair and production designer Mitch Epstein for shooting, the production crew added a dark green trim to the exterior to echo the verdant landscape of Uganda.

The film was co-produced by Nair and her then husband, Mitch Epstein, as the marriage was breaking up. While researching for the film in Uganda in 1989, Nair met Indo-Ugandan political scientist Mahmood Mamdani; they married in 1991, and their son Zohran (later to be elected mayor of New York City) was born in Kampala in the same year.

== Reception ==
On the review aggregator website Rotten Tomatoes, 92% of 74 critics' reviews are positive, with an average rating of 7.6/10. The website's consensus reads: "Sarita Choudhury and Denzel Washington's romantic chemistry lights up the screen in Mississippi Masala, Mira Nair's observant and sexy tale of cultures clashing." Metacritic, which uses a weighted average, assigned the film a score of 78 out of 100, based on 31 critics, indicating "generally favorable" reviews.

Vincent Canby of The New York Times wrote:

Mississippi Masala appears to have been produced on a modest (by Hollywood standards) budget, but it is a big movie in terms of talent, geography and concerns. Racism isn't the major issue, at least on the surface. Mina and Demetrius must fight the sense of cultural dislocation that, for different reasons, has become a part of the heritage of each.

Peter Rainer of Los Angeles Times wrote, "Despite the awkwardness of much of the staging, and the unevenness of the script, the movie does give you a sense of real people living real lives."

Bruce Williamson of Playboy wrote, "Moving back and forth in time, from gilded memories of Africa to the gritty facts of small-town Southern life, Masala—the word stands for a heady, varicolored mixture of spices—is ethnic drama with a pungent aftertaste."

== Awards and honors ==
- 1993 NAACP Image Award for Outstanding Actor in a Motion Picture – Denzel Washington
- 1991 São Paulo International Film Festival – Mira Nair, Critics Special Award
- 1991 48th Venice International Film Festival – Golden Osella Best Original Screenplay – Sooni Taraporevala; Golden Ciak/Best Film – Mira Nair

== Home media ==
On May 24, 2022, The Criterion Collection released Mississippi Masala in a newly restored 4K edition on Blu-ray and DVD. The special edition includes new interviews from Nair, Taraporevala, production designer and photographer Mitch Epstein, and cinematographer Edward Lachman.
