= The Redemption of Sin =

2024 mystery horror film

- Theatrical release poster
- Indonesian: Tebusan Dosa
- Directed by: Yosep Anggi Noen
- Screenplay by: Yosep Anggi Noen; Alim Sudio
- Produced by: Muhammad Zaidy; Meiske Taurisia
- Starring: Happy Salma; Putri Marino; Shogen
- Cinematography: Teoh Gay Hian
- Edited by: Akhmad Fesdi Anggoro
- Music by: Yudhi Arfani; Zeke Khaseli
- Production companies: Palari Films; Legacy Pictures; Showbox
- Release date: 17 October 2024
- Country: Indonesia
- Language: Indonesian

The Redemption of Sin (Indonesian: Tebusan Dosa) is a 2024 Indonesian mystery horror film directed by Yosep Anggi Noen from a screenplay he wrote with Alim Sudio. It stars Happy Salma, Putri Marino, and Shogen.

== Premise ==
A woman embarks on a quest to search for her missing daughter with the help of a Japanese researcher and a horror podcaster.

== Cast ==
- Happy Salma as Wening
- Putri Marino as Tirta
- Shogen as Tetsuya
- Bhisma Mulia as Ragus
- Haru Sandra as Wicak
- Keiko Ananta as Nirmala
- Laksmi Notokusumo as Uti Yah

== Production ==
In December 2023, Palari Films announced the then-untitled horror project, to be directed by Yosep Anggi Noen and starring Happy Salma and Putri Marino. The principal photography took place in Yogyakarta, Indonesia in January 2024. In September 2024, it was announced that the Korean production company Showbox had co-produced the film.

== Release ==
The Redemption of Sin was released in Indonesian cinemas on 17 October 2024. It garnered 160,712 admissions during its theatrical run.

== Accolades ==
Award / Film Festival	Date of ceremony	Category	Recipient(s)	Result	Ref.
Film Pilihan Tempo	5 February 2025	Best Actress	Happy Salma	Nominated	
Film Pilihan Tempo	5 February 2025	Best Supporting Actress	Putri Marino	Nominated	
