= Megumi (actress) =

Japanese singer, actress, television personality, and gravure idol

- めぐみ
- Born: Megumi Yamano; September 25, 1981 (age 45); Kurashiki, Okayama, Japan
- Other name: Megumi Furuya
- Occupations: tarento; actress; singer; gravure idol; producer
- Spouse: Kenji Furuya (m. 2008; div. 2023)
- Children: 1

Megumi Yamano (山野仁, Yamano Megumi; formerly Furuya (降谷), born September 25, 1981), known mononymously as Megumi (めぐみ), is a Japanese tarento, actress, singer, gravure idol and producer. She is currently affiliated with Suns Entertainment.

== Early life ==
She was raised in Kurashiki, Okayama, but was born in Matsue, Shimane.

She dropped out of Kurashiki Suishō Senior High School (at the time an all-girls school).

== Personal life ==
In July 2008, after discovering she was pregnant, Megumi married Dragon Ash lead singer Kenji Furuya, whom she had been dating since 2005. On February 6, 2009, Megumi gave birth to the couple's only child, a son.

On December 30, 2023, the couple jointly announced that they had divorced.

== Roles ==
=== Variety shows ===
- Aa! Hanano Ryōrinin (March 20, 2008, Nippon TV)
- Africa no Tsume (Nippon Television)
- Akashiya Santa no Shijōsaidai no Christmas Present Show (2001)
- Bachikoi! (Setonaikai Broadcasting Corporation)
- Blog Type (April–September 2005, Fuji TV)
- The God of Entertainment (Nippon Television)
- Gaki no Tsukai ya Arahende (Nippon Television)
- Ken Shimura's Baka Tonosama (Fuji TV)
- Hashire! Gulliver-kun (Kansai Telecasting Corporation)
- Hey! Spring of Trivia (Fuji TV)
- Tora no Mon (TV Asahi)
- Zenkoku Issei! Nihonjin Test (April 2008, Fuji TV)

=== Educational Television ===
- Onishi Hiroto's Basic English Recipe (April 2022, NHK Educational TV)

=== Radio ===
- MEGUMI-X (FM-FUJI)
- MEGUMI no MAKE ME HAPPY! (April–September 2005, Nippon Broadcasting System)

=== Commercials ===
- Asahi Breweries (2007)
- GyaO
- Japan Racing Association (2006)
- Morinaga & Company Weider in Jelly "Diet Weider"
- Nestle Japan Nescafe Santa Marta
- Okayama Prefecture
- Okayama Prefecture police (Improvement of traffic manners campaign)
- Rohto Pharmaceutical Co. FamilyMart Natural Cycle
- Sapporo Brewery
- Yellow Hat

=== Film ===
- Hero (2007), Sakurako Kōno
- SS (2008), Girako
- The Blood of Wolves (2018)
- Little Nights, Little Love (2018)
- Neet Neet Neet (2018)
- The Stormy Family (2019)
- One Night (2019)
- Stigmatized Properties (2020), Kaori
- The Way of the Househusband (2022), Kazuko Tanaka
- What to Do with the Dead Kaiju? (2022), the Minister of Health, Labour and Welfare
- Mado (2022)
- The Last 10 Years (2022)
- Downfall (2023), Nozomi Machida
- Scroll (2023)
- December (2023)
- Insomniacs After School (2023), Isaki's mother
- Ice Cream Fever (2023), Naoko Arakawa
- The Forbidden Play (2023), Shūko Noda
- Masked Hearts (2023)
- The Tales of Kurashiki (2025)
- Blank Canvas: My So-Called Artist's Journey (2025), Akiko's mother
- A Light in the Harbor (2025), Miwako Omori
- Nameless (2026), Hanako Yamada
- This Is I (2026)
- Chimney Town: Frozen in Time (2026), Moff (voice)
- Fujiko (2026), Nagura
- Goodbye My Car (2026), Arisa Kinomiya
- Beasts Clutching at Straws (2026)
- Three Millimeters to You (2026), Yoshimi
- The Day We Embraced the Universe (2027)

=== TV drama ===
- Ossan's Love: In the Sky (2019), Haruka Neko
- The Way of the Househusband (2020), Kazuko Tanaka
- The Naked Director Season 2 (2021)
- A Day-Off of Ryunosuke Kamiki (2022)
- Ōoku: The Inner Chambers (2023), Ōoka Tadasuke
- Informa (2023), Asuka Nagasawa
- Private Banker (2025), Kasumi Tenguuji
- The Hot Spot (2025), Noriko Inamoto

=== Dubbing ===
- Kung Fu Panda (2008), Master Viper
  - Kung Fu Panda 2 (2011), Master Viper
- Elemental (2023), Gale Cumulus
- The Garfield Movie (2024), Jinx

== Books ==
=== Photoalbums ===
- Gekkan MEGUMI (Shinchosha)
- Megami (Gakken)
- meg (Aqua House)

== Awards and nominations ==
Year	Award	Category	Work(s)	Result
2020	62nd Blue Ribbon Awards	Best Supporting Actress	The Stormy Family and One Night	Won

== See also ==
- Kenji Furuya (Dragon Ash) (husband)
- Ikkō Furuya (father-in-law)
