= Lily (Japanese singer) =

Japanese singer-songwriter and actress (1952–2016)

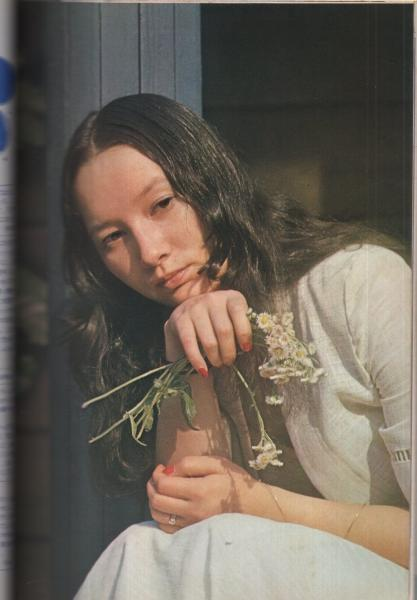
- Lily posing in music magazine 1974
- Born: Saeko Kamata; 17 February 1952; Fukuoka, Fukuoka Prefecture, Japan
- Died: 11 November 2016 (aged 64)
- Occupations: Singer; songwriter; actress

Saeko Kamata (Japanese: 鎌田 小恵子, Hepburn: Kamata Saeko; 17 February 1952 – 11 November 2016), commonly known as Lily (りりィ, Riri), was a Japanese singer, songwriter, and actress.

== Life and career ==
Saeko Kamata was born in Tenjin, Fukuoka City, Fukuoka Prefecture. She grew up in Tojinmachi and her family moved to Tokyo when she was in the third grade. Her mother ran a bar called Hisui (翡翠) in Nakasu, Fukuoka and her father was an officer in the US Air Force. Her father was reportedly killed in the Korean War before Lily was born.

At the age of 10, she moved to Tokyo with her family. She belonged to Toei's children's theater company for a year and a half. In 1966, while she was enrolled in Toei, she played a small role in Yoko, the Delinquent Girl (非行少女ヨーコ) starring Mako Midori. She did not attend high school and after her mother died when she was 17, she played piano and sang at bars to make ends meet. She said that her stage name, "Lily", was based on the nickname her peers gave her when she was hanging out. The first two characters in りりィ are hiragana, while the last character is in katakana. Normally names would only use one type of kana.

In 1971, she participated on Itsuroh Shimoda's album I'll Have to Disappear Without Anyone Knowing (遺言歌 誰にも知られずに消えるしかないさ). She sang lead vocals on the song "Hitori Hitori" (ひとりひとり) under the name Lenia (レーニア). The name was taken from British folk singer Donovan's song "Lalena".

She was managed by Moss Family (モス・ファミリ) (Ozawa Music Office). She started writing songs in earnest at the recommendation of Michio Yamagami. She was noted for her unique husky voice. Originally, she had a beautiful voice with a range of three octaves, but she drank over 3 liters of alcohol while she had a cold and continued singing until morning, destroying her voice.

On February 5, 1972, at the age of 19, she made her debut as a singer with the album Onion (たまねぎ) published by Toshiba Music Industry. 1972 was the year when many female singer-songwriters debuted, but Lily's debut was a bit earlier than her rivals (February 5, 1972), Hiroko Taniyama (April 25, 1972), Yumi Arai (July 5, 1972), and Mayumi Itsuwa (October 21, 1972).

In 1972, immediately after her debut, she appeared in Dear Summer Sister (夏の妹) directed by Nagisa Ōshima. Since then, she worked as an actress in parallel with her music activities.

The 1974 single "I Am Crying" (私は泣いています) was a huge hit, selling over 1 million copies. According to Ryotaro Konishi, Lily had written Japanese lyrics to the English language blue song "I'm Crying on the Bed" for fun. When she showed it to a friend, they told her that she needed to sing it, so she made it a single.

At the age of 24, she married drummer Tetsuya Nishi (ex-Funny-Company, who also participated in the Bye Bye Session Band at the time), but they separated after a year and divorced in 1981, seven years later.

During the Toshiba EMI era, she was accompanied by the Bye Bye Session Band as her backing band. Ryuichi Sakamoto recalled in his book, "At the time, the most popular session bands for musicians living in Tokyo were the Sadistic Mika Band and the Bye Bye Session Band, and many musicians took turns participating." In addition to Sakamoto, the main members included Kosuke Kida, Masami Tsuchiya, Ginji Ito, Ken Yoshida, Nobu Saito, Akira Inoue, and Ryoichi Kuniyoshi.

In 1982, Lily transferred to Victor Music Industry. After that, she married a second time and went on hiatus. In 1985, she had her only son, Juon. While she was raising her children, she moved to Sayama City, Saitama Prefecture, refrained from media exposure, and devoted herself to being a housewife for several years and until her son reached middle school and resumed her career. She would continue with her acting career until a 2000s revival in her music brought her back and she began touring with her husband as the Lily & Koji band. They usually played most of her songs in a more acoustic setting including some of her biggest hits. Lily died of cancer on November 11, 2016.

== Discography ==
Albums

- 1972: Onion (たまねぎ)
- 1973: Dulcimer (ダルシマ)
- 1974: Taeko (タエコ)
- 1974: Lily Live (りりィ Live, Riri Live)
- 1975: Love Letter (ラブ・レター, Rabu Retā)
- 1976: Auroila
- 1977: Lilicism (りりシズム, Riri Shimizu)
- 1978: Don't Worry (心配しないで, Don't Worry)
- 1979: Magenta (マジェンタ, Majenta)
- 1980: Southern Cross (南十字星)
- 1982: Modern Romance (モダン・ロマンス, Modan Romansu)
- 1983: Say
- 1988: Fairy Tale
- 1995: Ai (愛)
- 1995: Lily in PAB (りりィ in PAB, Riri in PAB)

Singles

- 1972: "Nigaoe" (にがお絵)
- 1972: "Quiz no Shōkin" (クイズの賞金, Kuizu no Shōkin)
- 1973: "Kokoro ga Itai" (心が痛い)
- 1974: "Watashi wa Naite Imasu" (私は泣いています)
- 1974: "Kaze no Itami" (風のいたみ)
- 1975: "Shiawase Sagashi" (しあわせさがし)
- 1975: "Tsuki no Serenade" (月のセレナーデ)
- 1976: "Ie e Oideyo" (家へおいでよ)
- 1976: "Namida no Nai Machi" (涙のない町)
- 1976: "Miss Carone Turbat" (ミス・キャロン・ターバット, Misu Kyaron Tābatto)
- 1977: "Kirei ni Naritai" (綺麗になりたい)
- 1978: "Sawagashī Rakuen" (さわがしい楽園)
- 1978: "E・S・P"
- 1978: "Bed de Tabako o Suwanaide" (ベッドで煙草を吸わないで, Beddo de Tabako o Suwanaide)
- 1979: "Oyashirazu" (おやしらず)
- 1980: "Namida no Daisan Keihin" (涙の第三京浜)
- 1981: "Namida no Driving" (涙のドライビング, Namida no Doraibingu)
- 1982: "Modern Romance"モダン・ロマンス (Modan Romansu)
- 1982: "Sara Sara" (さらさら)
- 1983: "Woman"
- 1983: "Sayonara Alice" (さよならアリス, Sayonara Arisu)
- 1986: "Kaze no Ballerina" (風のバレリーナ, Kaze no Barerīna)
- 1988: "Sayonara Loniliness" (さよならロンリネス, Sayonara Ronrinesu)
- 1989: "Rescue You"
- 1995: Demo Sayonara ga Ienai (でも さよならが言えない)

Compilations

- 1986: I Want You – Scene 1974–1986
- 1996: Twin Best Lily
- 2004: Golden Best Lily (ゴールデン☆ベスト りりィ, Gōruden ☆ Besuto Riri)

== Selected filmography ==
- Kinpachi-sensei (2001–2002)
- Kakashi (2001)
- Deadly Outlaw: Rekka (2002)
- Vital (2004)
- Linda Linda Linda (2005)
- Shinobi: Heart Under Blade (2005)
- Mushishi (2006)
- Gu-Gu Datte Neko de Aru (2008)
- Ikigami (2008)
- I Wish (2011)
- Moteki (2011)
- April Fools (2015)
- Gonin Saga (2015)
- A Bride for Rip Van Winkle (2016)
- Tsuioku (2017)
- Close-Knit (2017)
