= Shogen (actor) =

Japanese actor (born 1978)

- 尚玄
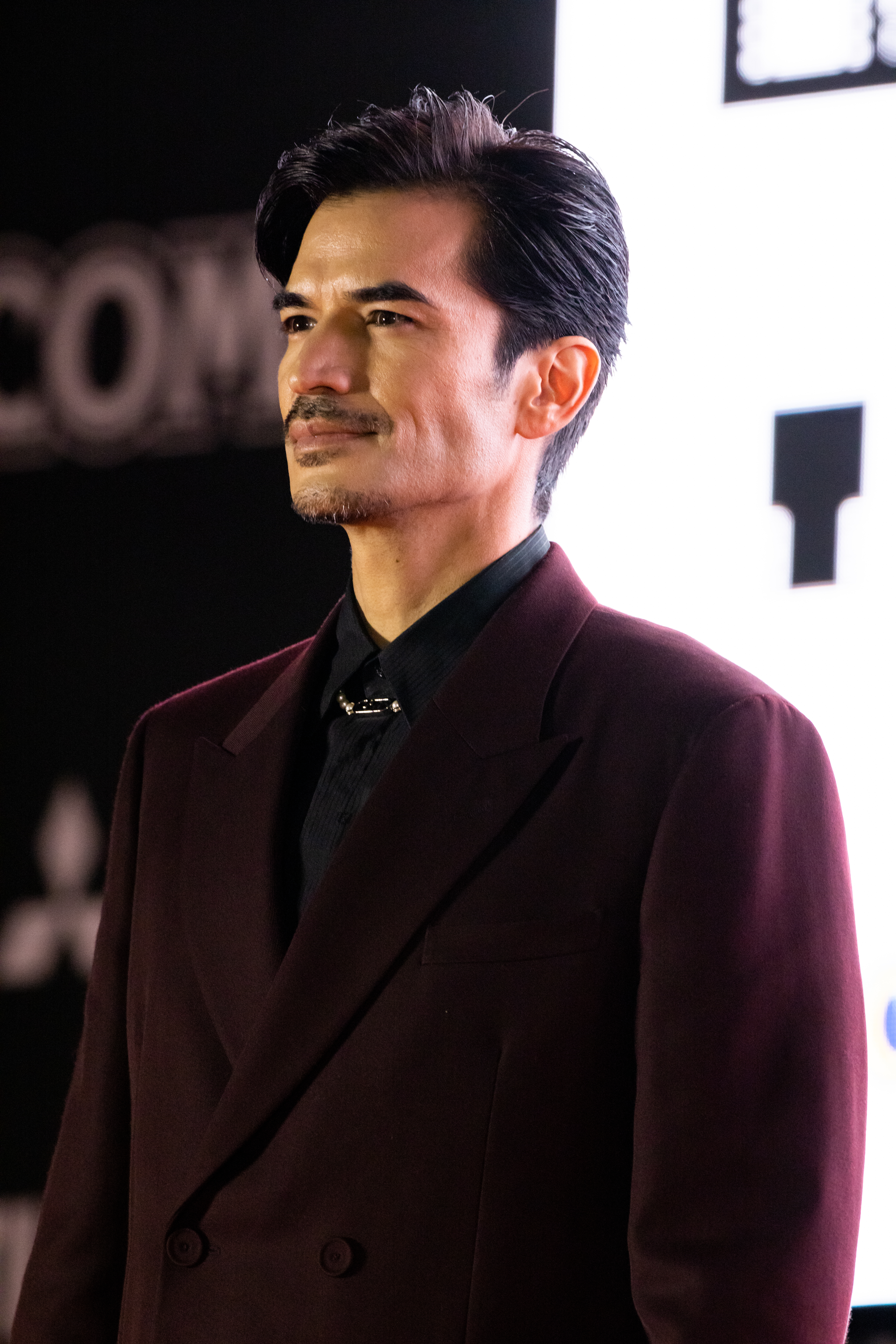
- Shogen at the 35th Tokyo International Film Festival in 2022
- Born: Shogen Itokazu; 20 June 1978 (age 47); Naha, Okinawa, Japan
- Occupations: Actor; model
- Spouse: May J. (m. 2022)
- Children: 1
- Website: www.shogenism.com

Shogen Itokazu (尚玄; born 20 June 1978), known mononymously as Shogen, is a Japanese actor. He is best known for his role as Nao Tsuchiyama in Gensan Punch (2021), which had a joint win for the Kim Jiseok award with The Rapist (2021) at the 26th Busan International Film Festival. Born in Okinawa, he formerly worked as a model before making his acting debut in Bloody Snake Under the Sun (2005).

== Career ==
Shogen originally worked as a model in Paris, Milan, and London. In 2004, he returned to Japan and acted in his debut film, Bloody Snake Under the Sun (2005), which was nominated at the 20th Tokyo International Film Festival. After this experience, he developed an interest in acting after meeting a method actor, and travelled to New York for lessons in 2009. He studied under Susan Batson and Roberta Wallch, actress Nicole Kidman's private coaches. In 2010, Shogen was chosen by CNN for its Tokyo Hot List: 20 People to Watch.

In 2018, he starred in Tsukasa Kishimoto's Kokoro, Odoru (2018) as Yuhi. Before this, he had a role in a Malaysian television show. That same year, he pitched a film idea to Brillante Mendoza at the 31st Tokyo International Film Festival through mutual friend Eric Khoo. The film would later become Gensan Punch (2021), a story inspired by his friend Nao Tsuchiyama, a Japanese boxer with a prosthetic leg. For the role, Shogen exercised five to six times a week to look like a boxer. He also used tape to tie his ankles and legs, then performed punches to imitate the movements of disabled people.

Gensan Punch later premiered at the Tokyo and Busan film festivals; the latter of which awarded the film the Kim Jiseok award, in a joint win with The Rapist (2021). In 2022, he starred in Anshul Chauhan's December (2022), which was nominated for the Kim Jiseok award at the 27th Busan International Film Festival. That same year, he also starred in Lighting Over the Beyond (2022). In 2024, he starred in Yosep Anggi Noen's horror film The Redemption of Sin (2024).

In 2025, Shogen starred in Josh C. Waller's Lone Samurai, where he portrayed the protagonist Riku. To prepare for the role, he trained for three weeks. He was also the Cinema Ambassador to the Okinawa Pan Pacific International Film Festival.

== Personal life ==
Shogen was born in Okinawa, Japan, on 20 June 1978. He considers himself influenced by Okinawa practices. In 2022, he married singer May J. and they had a child in 2023.

== Filmography ==
=== Film ===
Year	Title	Role	Notes	Ref.
2007	Bloody Snake Under the Sun	Ryo Yonaha	Lead role	
2009	Kafoo: Waiting For Happiness	Shunichi Teruya		
2014	Uzumasa Limelight	Jun Kudo		
2021	Gensan Punch	Nao Tsuchiyama		
2022	December	Katsu		
2022	Lightning Over the Beyond			
2023	One Last Bloom			
2024	A Day Begins			
2024	The Redemption of Sin	Tetsuya		
2025	Army on the Tree	Lieutenant Matsuo		
2025	Hero's Island	Taira		
2025	Purehearted	Eiichi Gima		
2025	Lone Samurai	Riku		

=== Television ===
Year	Title	Role	Notes	Ref.
2013	Yae's Sakura	Unnamed role	1 episode; Taiga drama	
2015	Death Note	Raye Penber	3 episodes	
