= Osaka Asian Film Festival =

Annual film festival in Japan

Osaka Asian Film Festival 大阪アジアン映画祭
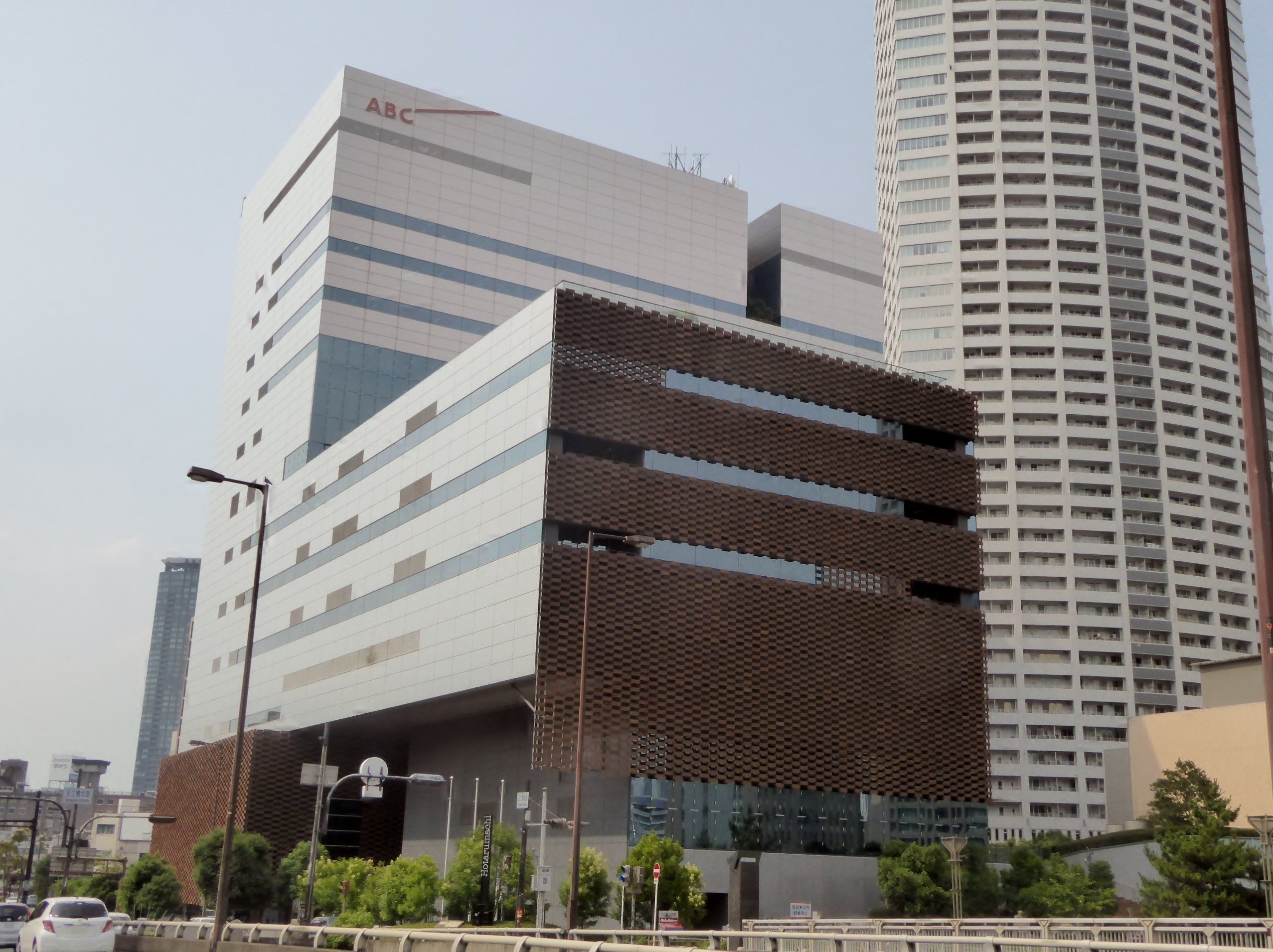
- ABC Hall, the venue of the festival, is situated within the Asahi Broadcasting Building.
- Location: Osaka, Japan
- Founded: 2005
- Festival date: March
- Website: http://www.oaff.jp

The Osaka Asian Film Festival (OAFF, Ōsaka Ajian ēga sai (Japanese: 大阪アジアン映画祭)) is an annual film festival held in Osaka City, Osaka Prefecture, Japan in March. The festival began in 2005 and currently introduces Asian films.

== History ==
In December 2005, the Korean Entertainment Film Festival was inaugurated in Osaka to celebrate the 40th anniversary of the establishment of Japan–South Korea relations. In 2016, the festival was renamed Osaka Asian Film Festival to include not only Korean films, but also those from East Asian countries, such as Hong Kong, Japan and China. In addition, Malaysian and Thai films from South Asia were also introduced in the 3rd Festival in 2007.

At the 4th festival in 2009, film critic Sōzō Teruoka was appointed the programming director. "From Osaka, to the whole Japan, then to Asia!" was adopted as the theme in order to introduce premiering films and new directors from Japan. From its 4th edition onwards, the festival was held in March (overlapping the Osaka Cinema Festival) at the ABC Hall of Asahi Broadcasting Building in Hotarumachi, with the exception of the 8th festival in 2013. The Audience Award was introduced.

At the 6th festival in 2011, the competition section was established, which awards the Grand Prix, Most Promising Talent Award and ABC Award. Since the beginning, the Asian Meeting Osaka was set up to handle the release and exchange about the films aided by the Cinema Organisation Osaka (CO2) and produced by new Asian producers. In 2012, the Cinema Organisation Osaka became the Indie Forum as a result of integration of sections, and the organiser was renamed from Osaka Asian Film Festival Executive Committee to Osaka Executive Committee for the Promotion of Moving. In 2015, the Yakushi Pearl Award was established to award the most brilliant performer.

In 2016, the Japan Society (organiser of Japan Cuts festival) from New York City established the JAPAN CUTS Award for films with exceptional excitement and creativity, mainly for Japanese independent films and films screened by Indie Forum.

In 2018, the Housen Short Film Award was established by the Housen Cultural Foundation to award the best short film with length of less than 60 minutes which screen at OAFF as Japan Premieres.

== Venues ==
- 2005 (1st) – 2006 (2nd): Recital Hall (within Festival Hall)
- 2007 (3rd): Sogo Hall
- 2009 (4th) – 2012 (7th): ABC Hall (within Asahi Broadcasting Building)
- 2013 (8th): Umeda Burg 7
- 2014 (9th) onwards: ABC Hall

== Past festivals ==
=== Korean Entertainment Film Festival 2005 in Osaka ===
- Period: 9–23 December 2005
- "Eve": Current Japan-Korea New Wave (Collection of new directors from Japan and Korea)
- "Japanese and Korean Famous Film": To a Nearby Nearby country

=== Osaka Asian Film Festival 2006 (2nd) ===
- Period: 4–30 November 2006
- Film Selection "Fabulous Asian Movie Stars!"

=== Osaka Asian Film Festival 2007 (3rd) ===
- Period: 2–23 November 2007
- Special Program: "Movies and Comedies, Million Laughs"

=== Osaka Asian Film Festival 2009 (4th) ===
- Period: 7–22 March 2009
- Award
  - Audience Award: Love of Siam (Thailand)

=== Osaka Asian Film Festival 2010 (5th) ===
- Period: 6–14 March 2010
- Special Programs
  - In Memory of Yasmin Ahmad
  - SAPPORO Short Fest 2009 Special screenings
- Award
  - Audience Award: Hear Me (Taiwan)

=== Osaka Asian Film Festival 2011 (6th) ===
- Period: 5–13 March 2011
- Sections: Competition, Special Screenings
- Special Programs:
  - Directors in Focus" Kōji Fukada
  - Best Selection of Selected Korean Films
  - Johnnie Talks About Love
- Awards
  - Grand Prix: Lover's Discourse (Hong Kong)
  - Most Promising Talent Award: Banjong Pisanthanakun (Director, Hello Stranger)
  - ABC Award: Hello Stranger (Thailand)
  - Audience Award: Love You Ten Thousand Years (Taiwan)
- International Competition Jury: Chairman Isao Yukisada (Director, Japan), Kim Dae-woo (Director, Korea), Milkman Saitō (Critic, Japan)

=== Osaka Asian Film Festival 2012 (7th) ===
- Period: 9–18 March 2012
- Sections: Competition, Special Screenings, Indie Forum
- Special Program
  - Hong Kong Film Festival
- Awards
  - Grand Prix: God's Own Child (India)
  - Most Promising Talent Award: Namewee (Director, Nasi Lemak 2.0)
  - Special Mentions: Lovely Man (Indonesia), The Sword Identity (China)
  - ABC Award: God's Own Child (India)
  - Audience Award: Warriors of the Rainbow (Taiwan)
- International Competition Jury: Chairman Kōshi Ueno (Critic, Japan), Kim Tai-sik (Director, Korea), Adam Wong (Director, Hong Kong)

=== Osaka Asian Film Festival 2013 (8th) ===
- Period: 8–17 March 2013
- Sections: Competition, Special Screenings, Indie Forum
- Special Programs:
  - Special Focus On Hong Kong
  - Directors in Focus: Li Yu's Cinema World
  - Celebrating Seven-something Years of GTH: New Miracle of Thai Cinema
  - New Frontier of Japanese Filmmakers
  - Memorial 3.11: Two Years from Great East Japan Earthquake
- Awards:
  - Grand Prix: Beloved (China)
  - Most Promising Talent Award: Huang Peijia (Actor, Cha Cha for Twins)
  - Special Mention: Tatsuya Nakadai (Actor, Japan's Tragedy)
  - ABC Award: Cha Cha for Twins (Taiwan)
  - Audience Award: Love in the Buff (Hong Kong)
- International Competition Jury: Zoë Chan (Program director of Golden Horse Awards, Taiwan), Tsang Tsui-shan (Director, Hong Kong), Yōichirō Takahashi (Director, Japan)

=== Osaka Asian Film Festival 2014 (9th) ===
- Period: 7–16 March 2014
- Sections: Competition, Special Screenings, Indie Forum
- Special Programs:
  - Taiwan: Movies on the Move 2014
    - Mini collection: Taiwanese language films and Japan
  - Special Focus On Hong Kong 2014
    - Special Screenings in Memory of Run Run Shaw
  - Memorial 3.11: Three Years from Great East Japan Earthquake
- Awards:
  - Grand Prix: Shift (Philippines)
  - Most Promising Talent Award: Ha Jung-woo (director, Fasten Your Seatbelt)
  - Best Actress Award: Carina Lau (actress, Bends)
  - Special Mention: Anita's Last Cha-Cha (Philippines)
  - ABC Award: Forever Love (Taiwan)
  - Audience Award: KANO (Taiwan)
- International Competition Jury: Eugene Domingo (Actor, Philippines), Tom Lin Shu-yu (Director, Taiwan), Lina Yang (Director, China)

=== Osaka Asian Film Festival 2015 (10th) ===
- Period: 6–15 March 2015
- Sections: Competition, Special Screenings, Indie Forum
- Special Programs:
  - New Action! Southeast Asia
  - Taiwan: Movies on the Move 2015
    - Mini collection: Edward Yang and Taiwan New Cinema
  - Special Focus On Hong Kong 2015
  - Memorial 3.11: Four Years from Great East Japan Earthquake
- Awards:
  - Grand Prix: Meeting Dr. Sun (Taiwan)
  - Most Promising Talent Award: Mez Tharatorn (Director, I Fine..Thank You..Love You)
  - Special Mention: Charlene Choi (Actor, Sara)
  - ABC Award: The Continent (China)
  - Yakushi Pearl Award: Preechaya Pongthananikorn (Actor, I Fine..Thank You..Love You)
  - Audience Award: Meeting Dr. Sun (Taiwan)
- International Competition Jury: Chairman Pang Ho-cheung (Director, Hong Kong). Rina Takeda (Actor, Japan), Yoon Jin-seo (Actor, Korea)

=== Osaka Asian Film Festival 2016 (11th) ===
- Period: 4–13 March 2016
- Sections: Competition, Special Screenings, Indie Forum
- Special Programs:
  - New Action! Southeast Asia
    - Vietnamese Cinema in Bloom
    - Southeast Asia Classic
  - Taiwan: Movies on the Move 2016
  - Special Focus On Hong Kong 2016
- Awards:
  - Grand Prix: My Sister, the Pig Lady (Korea)
  - Most Promising Talent Award: Uisenma Borchu (Director, Scriptwriter, Actor, Don't Look at Me That Way)
  - JAPAN CUTS Award: Somewhere in My Memory (Director: Keihiro Kanyama)
  - ABC Award: Heart Attack (Freelance) (Thailand)
  - Yakushi Pearl Award: Ella Chen (Actor, The Missing Piece)
  - Audience Award: Wansei Back Home (Taiwan)
- International Competition Jury: Chairman Yee Chin-yen (Director, Taiwan), Phan Dang Di (Director, Vietnam), Joko Anwar (Director, Indonesia)

=== Osaka Asian Film Festival 2017 (12th) ===
- Period: 3–12 March 2017
- Sections: Competition, Special Screenings, Indie Forum
- Special Programs:
  - In & Out of Work
  - New Action! Southeast Asia
  - Special Focus On Hong Kong 2017
- 130th Anniversary of Thailand-Japan Diplomatic Relations
- Supported Program: Housen Cultural Foundation: Support for film study and production
- Awards:
  - Grand Prix: Mad World (Hong Kong)
  - Most Promising Talent Award: Fish Liew (Actor, Sisterhood)
  - Special Mention: By the Time It Gets Dark (Thailand)
  - JAPAN CUTS Award: Love and Good Bye and Hawaii (Director: Shingo Matsumura)
  - ABC Award: Soul Mate (Hong Kong, China)
  - Yakushi Pearl Award: Iza Calzado (Actress, Bliss)
  - Audience Award: 29+1 (Hong Kong)
- International Competition Jury: Ho Yuhang (Director, Malaysia), Monster Jimenez (Producer, Writer, Director, Philippines). Miho Nakanishi (Actor, Japan)

=== Osaka Asian Film Festival 2018 (13th) ===
- Period: 9–18 March 2018
- Sections: Competition, Special Screenings, Indie Forum
- Special Programs:
  - New Action! Southeast Asia
  - Special Focus On Hong Kong 2018
  - Taiwan: Movies on the Move 2018
  - SANDAAN: 100 Years of Philippine Cinema
- Supported Program: Housen Cultural Foundation: Support for film study and production
- Awards:
  - Grand Prix: No.1 Chung Ying Street (Hong Kong)
  - Most Promising Talent Award: Mikhail Red (Director, Neomanila)
  - Best Actress Award: Shuna Iijima (Actor, Bad Poetry Tokyo)
  - ABC Award: Take Me To the Moon (Taiwan)
  - Yakushi Pearl Award: Ryza Cenon (Actor, Mr. and Mrs. Cruz)
  - JAPAN CUTS Award: KUSHINA, what will you be (Director: Moët Hayami)
  - Housen Short Film Award: CYCLE-CYCLE (Director: Junichi Kanai)
  - Audience Award: Love Off the Cuff (Hong Kong)
- International Competition Jury: Phan Gia Nhat Linh (Director, Vietnam), Kim Jung-eun (Director, Korea), Lim Kah-wai (Director, Malaysia)

=== Osaka Asian Film Festival 2019 (14th) ===
- Period: 8–17 March 2019
- Sections: Competition, Special Screenings, Indie Forum
- Special Programs:
  - New Action! Asia
  - Special Focus On Hong Kong 2019
  - Taiwan: Movies on the Move 2019
- Supported Program: Housen Cultural Foundation: Support for film study and production
- Awards:
  - Grand Prix: Maggie (Korea)
  - Most Promising Talent Award: BAI Xue (Director, The Crossing)
  - Special Mention: HAN Ka-ram (Director, Our Body)
  - Special Mention: Bulbul Can Sing (India)
  - ABC TV Award: Aruna & Her Palate (Indonesia)
  - Yakushi Pearl Award: Nilmini SIGERA (Actor, Asandhimitta)
  - JAPAN CUTS Award: Demolition Girl (Director: Genta MATSUGAMI)
  - JAPAN CUTS Award / Special Mention: WHOLE (Director: Bilal KAWAZOE)
  - Housen Short Film Award: till next time (Director: Paulie HUANG Chih-Chia)
  - Housen Short Film Award / Special Mention: 2923 (Director: Sunny YU)
  - Audience Award: Still Human (Hong Kong)
- International Competition Jury: Yvette CHOU (Director, Taiwan), Jakub KROLIKOWSKI (Artistic Director and Co-founder of Five Flavours Film Festival, Poland), Samantha LEE (Director, Philippines)
- Housen Short Film Award Jury: Choi Hee-seo (Actor, Korea), Yoshinori SATO (Director, Japan), Kazu WATANABE (Deputy Director of Film at Japan Society, USA)

=== Osaka Asian Film Festival 2020 (15th) ===
- Period: 6–15 March 2020
- Sections: Competition, Spotlight, Indie Forum, Special Screenings
- Special Programs:
  - New Action! Southeast Asia
  - Our Lights and Shadows: Celebrating 101 Years of Korean Cinema
  - Taiwan: Movies on the Move 2020
  - Special Focus On Hong Kong 2020
- Supported Program: Housen Cultural Foundation: Support for film study and production
- Awards:
  - Grand Prix: Happy Old Year (Thailand)
  - Most Promising Talent Award: PARK Sun-joo (Director, Way Back Home)
  - Best Actor: Hidemasa MASE (Leading Actor, Kontora)
  - ABC TV Award: Write about Love (Philippines)
  - Yakushi Pearl Award: Leon Dai (Supporting Actor, Your Name Engraved Herein)
  - JAPAN CUTS Award: The Murders of Oiso (Director: Takuya MISAWA)
  - Housen Short Film Award: Hammock (Director: Kentaro KISHI)
  - Audience Award: Better Days (China, Hong Kong)
- International Competition Jury: Koyo UDAGAWA (Film Critic, Japan), Urara Matsubayashi (Actor and Producer, Japan)
- Housen Short Film Award Jury: Anshul CHAUHAN (Director, Japan), Kiyotaka MORIWAKI (Senior Curator, Chief of Film and Information Room, THE MUSEUM OF KYOTO, Japan)

=== Osaka Asian Film Festival 2021 (16th) ===
- Period: 5–14 March 2021
- Sections: Competition, Spotlight, Indie Forum, Special Screenings
- Special Programs:
  - New Action! Southeast Asia
  - Taiwan: Movies on the Move, Classic and Contemporary
  - Special Focus on Hong Kong 2021
- Special Screening Supported by Kobe College, Department of English
- Supported Program: Housen Cultural Foundation: Support for film study and production
- Awards:
  - Grand Prix: Ito (Japan)
  - Most Promising Talent Award: CHOI Jin-young (Director, The Slug)
  - ABC TV Award: Sister Sister (Vietnam)
  - Yakushi Pearl Award: Lily LEE (Leading Actor, Born to be Human)
  - JAPAN CUTS Award: B/B (Director: Kosuke NAKAHAMA)
  - JAPAN CUTS Award Special Mention: Among Four of Us (Director: Mayu NAKAMURA)
  - Housen Short Film Award: In-young's Camcorder (Director: OH Jeong-seon)
  - Audience Award: Ito (Japan)
- Competition Jury: Tsukasa ARIYOSHI (Representative of the movie distribution company Magic Hour, Japan), Yuka KIMBARA (Film Journalist, Japan), Takuji SUZUKI (Film Director, Actor, Japan)
- Housen Short Film Award Jury: Hiroshi OKUHARA (Director, Japan), Noriko YAMASAKI (Manager of the mini-theater Cine Nouveau), Satoko YOKOHAMA (Director, Japan)

=== Osaka Asian Film Festival 2022 (17th) ===
- Period: 10–20 March 2022
- Sections: Competition, Spotlight, Indie Forum, Special Screenings
- Special Programs:
  - Director in Focus: YOKOHAMA Satoko
  - New Action! Southeast Asia
  - Taiwan: Movies on the Move 2022
  - Special Focus on Hong Kong 2022
- Supported Program: Housen Cultural Foundation: Support for film study and production
- Awards:
  - Grand Prix: Aloners (Korea)
  - Most Promising Talent Award: Kasho IIZUKA (Director, Angry Son)
  - Competition Special Mention: Anita (Hong Kong)
  - ABC TV Award: The First Girl I Loved (Hong Kong)
  - Yakushi Pearl Award: Bayarjargal BAYARTSETSEG (Leading Actor, The Sales Girl)
  - JAPAN CUTS Award: Sanka: Nomads of the mountains (Director: Ryohei SASATANI)
  - Housen Short Film Award: We'll Never Get Lost Together Again (Director: Eugene KOSHIN)
  - Audience Award: Anita (Hong Kong)
- Competition Jury: Shuna IIJIMA (Actress, Japan), Miyuki TAKEI (Representative of the film company MOVIOLA, Japan), Esther YEUNG (COO, We Pictures, Hong Kong)
- Housen Short Film Award Jury: Mirai HAYASHI (Manager of the mini-theater Motomachi Cinema, Japan), Takashi KITAKOJI (Film Critic / Professor, Kyoto University of the Arts, Japan), Kousuke ONO (Producer, Japan)

=== Osaka Asian Film Festival 2023 (18th) ===
- Period: 10–19 March 2023
- Sections: Competition, Spotlight, Indie Forum, Special Screenings
- Special Program:
  - Special Focus on Hong Kong 2023
- Supported Program:
  - Housen Cultural Foundation: Support for film study and production
- Special Presentation:
  - Expo‘70 Osaka and TAKAHASHI Katsuo
- Awards:
  - Grand Prix: Like & Share (Indonesia)
  - Most Promising Talent Award: Kai KO (Director, Bad Education)
  - ABC TV Award: Over My Dead Body (Hong Kong)
  - Yakushi Pearl Award: LU Hsiao-fen (Leading Actor, Day Off)
  - JAPAN CUTS Award: When Morning Comes, I Feel Empty (Director: Yuho ISHIBASHI)
  - Housen Short Film Award: Swallow Flying to the South (Director: Mochi LIN)
  - Housen Short Film Award Special Mention: Daddy-To-Be (Taiwan)
  - Audience Award: Day Off (Taiwan)
- Competition Jury: HO Cheuk Tin (Director, Hong Kong), HSIEH Pei-ju (Director, Taiwan), Rie TSUKINAGA (Journalist, Japan)
- Housen Short Film Award Jury: Gina S. Noer (Director, Indonesia), Banjong PISANTHANAKUN (Director, Thailand), Noriko TANAKA (Manager, Kobe Planet Film Archive, Japan), Eric TSANG Hing Weng (Director, Hong Kong)

=== Osaka Asian Film Festival 2024 (19th) ===
- Period: 1–10 March 2024
- Sections: Competition, Spotlight, Indie Forum, Special Screenings
- Special Program:
  - Thai Cinema Kaleidoscope 2024
  - Taiwan: Movies on the Move 2024
  - Special Focus on Hong Kong 2024
- Special Presentation sponsored by Kobe College, Department of English
- Special Presentation:
  - Expo ’70 Osaka and Teshigahara Hiroshi
- Housen Cultural Foundation-supported programs <Grant for Film Study and Production> <Commendation for Student Films>
- Awards:
  - Grand Prix: City of Wind (Director: Lkhagvadulam Purev-Ochir)
  - Most Promising Talent Award: LIEN Chien Hung (Director, Salli)
  - ABC TV Award: Salli
  - Yakushi Pearl Award: CHI Yun (Leading Actor, Unborn Soul)
  - JAPAN CUTS Award: Performing KAORU’s Funeral (Director: Noriko YUASA)
  - JAPAN CUTS Award Special Mention: Blue Imagine (Director: Urara MATSUBAYASHI)
  - Housen Short Film Award: Sojourn to Shangri-la (Director: LIN Yihan)
  - Housen Short Film Award Special Mention: On a Boat (Director: Heso)
  - Housen Short Film Award Special Mention: Sweet Lime (Director: Fatema ABDOOLCARIM)
  - Audience Award: Amalock (Director: NAKAMURA Kazuhiro)
