= Born to Be Human =

2021 film by Lily Ni

- Chinese: 生而為人
- Directed by: Lily Ni
- Written by: Lily Ni
- Based on: An autobiographical account by the director
- Produced by: Tung Ting An; Kevin Yi
- Starring: Ling-Wei Lee; Vera Chen; Chao-te Yin; Yao-Jen Chang; Yang Chen; Cheng-Mei Chuang; Alice Lee; Hsing-Wen Li; Zi-Cheng Li; Bonnie Liang; Yu-Hsien Lin; Hsiao-yuan Wang; Frances Wu; Chung-Min Yin
- Cinematography: Po-Hsiung Huang
- Edited by: Yi-Men Tu
- Music by: Yi-Wei Chen; Book Chien; Jia-Shen Yang
- Release date: 11 March 2021 (Japan)
- Running time: 105 minutes
- Country: Taiwan
- Language: Mandarin

Born to Be Human (Chinese: 生而為人; pinyin: Shēng ér wéi rén) is a 2021 Taiwanese drama film with LGBTQ+ themes, written and directed by Lily Ni. The film follows the story of an adolescent intersex boy, Shi-Nan, and explores themes of medical violence and gender identity. For her performance in the lead role, Ling-Wei Lee won the Yakushi Pearl Award at the Osaka Asian Film Festival 2021, where the film premiered.

Since September 2024, the film has been available on the YouTube channel of Lily Ni—the film's writer and director.

== Plot ==
Shi-Nan appears to be an ordinary 14-year-old—he plays video games obsessively and bristles when his mother calls for him while he's masturbating. His life shatters when severe abdominal pain strikes, followed by blood in his urine. Initially dismissed as an infection, medical tests later reveal Shi-Nan has a disorder of sex development: he is intersex, with outwardly male anatomy but internal female reproductive organs (including ovaries and a uterus), a condition that remained undetected until that point.

Under pressure from the doctor and social stigma, Shi-Nan's parents consent to irreversible genital surgery without his informed consent, intending to "normalize" his body to match his XX chromosomes. When Shi-Nan awakens from the procedure, he finds himself forcibly redesignated as female and renamed Shi-Lan. The film traces his traumatic struggle to reconcile societal expectations with his own fractured sense of self, exposing the harms of non-consensual intersex medical interventions.

== Cast ==
- Ling-Wei Lee as Shi-Nan/Shi-Lan (credited as Lily Lee)
- Vera Chen as Chen Jie
- Chao-te Yin as Lee Pei-Rui (credited as Yin Jau Der)
- Yao-Jen Chang as PE teacher
- Yang Chen as Hsu Jui
- Cheng-Mei Chuang as Hsu Tien (credited as Mu Mei)
- Alice Lee as Dr. Lee's mom
- Hsing-Wen Li as Yang Guo-Ying
- Zi-Cheng Li as Old school bully
- Bonnie Liang as Chang Tian-Qi
- Yu-Hsien Lin as Ko Hao (credited as Mo-Cheng Lin)
- Hsiao-yuan Wang as Liu Cho-Sung
- Frances Wu as Ku Shu-Chuan
- Chung-Min Yin as Wang Wei

== Reception ==
Ling-Wei Lee (credited as Lily Lee) won the Yakushi Pearl Award at the Osaka Asian Film Festival for her role in the film.
