= Maho Nonami =

Japanese actress (born 1980)

- Born: 13 May 1980 (age 46); Tokyo, Japan
- Years active: 1996–present
- Agent: Toho Entertainment
- Spouse: Kensei Mikami (m. 2012)
- Children: 2

Maho Nonami (野波麻帆 Nonami Maho born 13 May 1980 in Tokyo, Japan) is a Japanese actress, best known for her role in the critically acclaimed 2LDK.

== Career ==
Nonami began her career in 1996 by winning the Grand Prix at the 4th Toho Cinderella Audition.

== Filmography ==
=== Film ===
- 1997 Rebirth of Mothra II, Yuna
- 1998 Begging for Love (aka Ai o kou hito), Migusa Yamaoka
- 2001 Kakashi (aka Scarecrow), Kaoru Yoshikawa
- 2001 Puratonikku sekusu (aka Platonic Sex), Akemi Yamaguchi
- 2002 2LDK, Lana
- 2003 Summer Nude, Natsuki Hasebe
- 2003 Keep on Rocking
- 2004 Mondai no nai watashitachi, Akane Kato
- 2005 Su-ki-da
- 2018 The Lies She Loved
- 2020 The Asadas
- 2022 Even If This Love Disappears From the World Tonight
- 2022 Roleless, Riho
- 2024 Don't Lose Your Head!, Riku
- 2025 Stella Next to Me, Ritsuko Koyanagi
- 2025 Tiger, Minami
- 2026 Until We Meet Again, Keiko Nagano
- 2026 Blue Lock, Iyo Isagi
- 2026 My Crazy Feminist Girlfriend

=== Television ===
- 1999 Second Chance, (Episode 3)
- 2002 Tobo (aka Escape)
- 2003 Dollhouse, Ayumi
- 2004 Kaseifu ha mita! 22, Eri Itonaga
- 2008 4 Shimai Tantei Dan, Horie Ryoko (ep. 4)
- 2011 I'm Mita, Your Housekeeper.
- 2026 Soda Master, Emi Yoshii

== Awards and nominations ==
Year	Award	Category	Work(s)	Result	Ref.
1999	22nd Japan Academy Film Prize	Best Supporting Actress	Begging for Love	Nominated	
1999	22nd Japan Academy Film Prize	Newcomer of the Year	Begging for Love	Won	
