= SCS Films =

American independent film company

- Company type: Independent
- Industry: Film
- Founded: 1992
- Headquarters: Hollywood, California, USA
- Key people: Stephen C. Swid
- Products: Motion pictures

SCS Films (formerly known as Nelson Entertainment Group) is an American film company owned by New York financier Stephen Swid.

It was responsible for the 1992 movie Mississippi Masala starring Denzel Washington. In 1994, SCS Films was involved in a lawsuit due to a copyright infringement problem related to the movie titled Passion Fish (which was nominated for two Oscars that year).
