= Vytautas V. Landsbergis =

Lithuanian poet (born 1962)

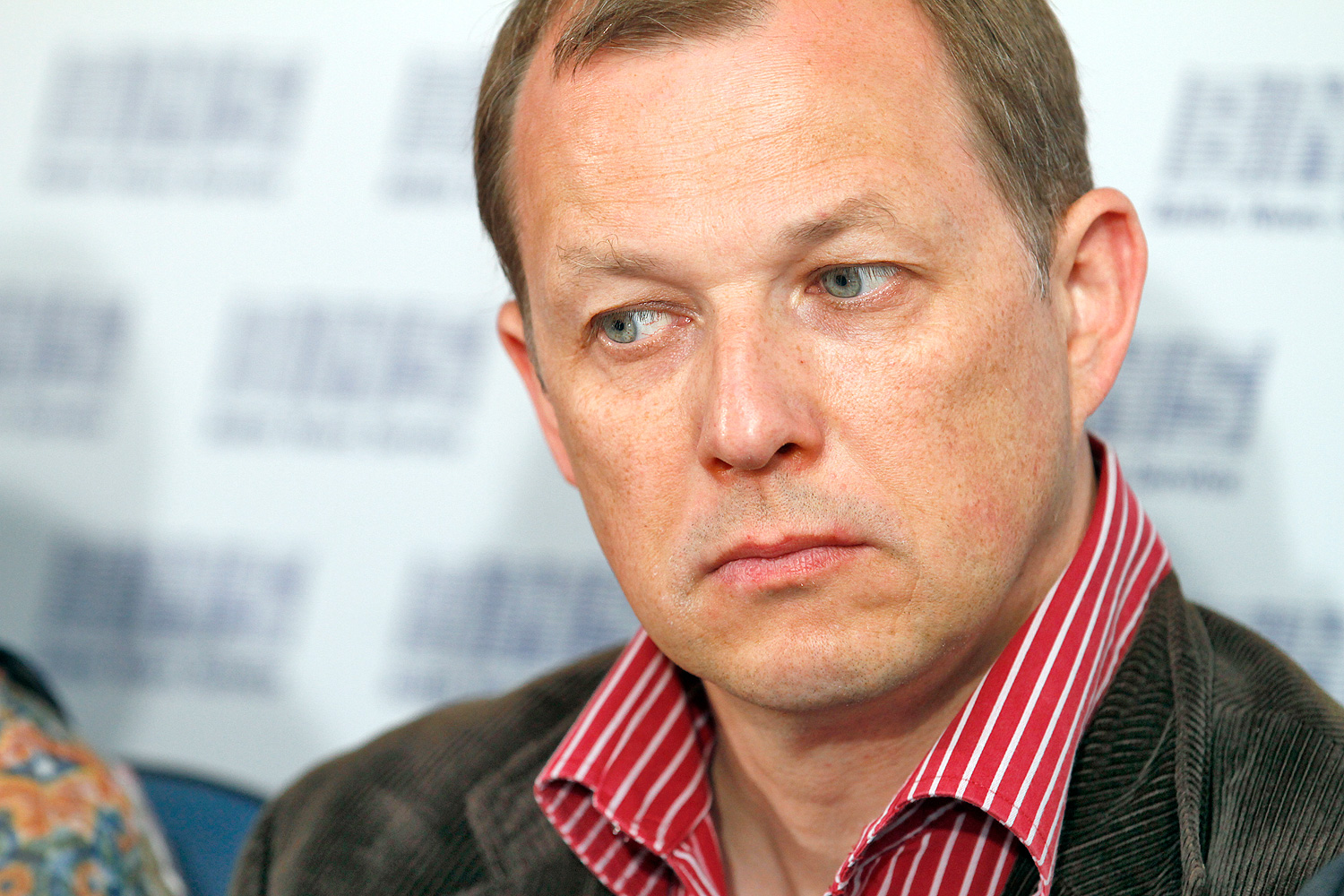

Vytautas V. Landsbergis (born 25 May 1962 in Vilnius) is a Lithuanian writer, journalist, director of films and theater, children's book writer. He is son of Vytautas Landsbergis and father of Gabrielius Landsbergis.

== Life ==
He studied at the Vilnius Antanas Vienuolis School. Studied at Vilnius University in the philology faculty, finished Lithuanian studies. Studied directing at the Tbilisi Theater Institute and Jonas Mekas' Anthology Archive in New York. In 1996 V. V. Landsbergis studied theater directing in Leeds, UK the young European director's school.

== Filmography ==
- Svečiuose pas Vytautą Kašubą (1992)
- Baladė apie Daumantą (1995)
- Povilas Pečiulaitis-Lakštingala (1995)
- Vilties Prezidentas (1996, Bolonijos (žiūrovų prizas) filmų festivaliuose; 1997)
- Epitafija ant poeto kapo (1998)
- Apie Apreiškimus (1998)
- Karininko romansas (1999; televizijos žiūrovų išrinktas geriausiu metų muzikinių video filmu)
- Jono Meko antologija (2000)
- Vilius Orvidas (2001)
- Švendubrės Šamanas (2001)
- Iš niekur, į niekur (2002)
- Jonukas ir Grytutė (2002)
- Visa teisybė apie mano tėvą (2003)
- Niujorkas – mano šuo (2004)
- Verdenė (2004)
- Dabar ir mūsų mirties valandą (2004)
- Apreiškimai Jonukui (2004)
- Iš karčiamėlės (2005)
- Liudvikas (2007)
- Kai aš buvau partizanas (2008, Blue November filmų festivalyje pelnė apdovanojimą už geriausią istoriją (Best story, JAV, 2008), *Nuo pasaulio stogo (2010)
- Partizano žmona (2011)
- Poetas (The Poet) (2022)

== Books ==
- Pasakojimai apie namus (poems, 1992)
- Rudnosiuko istorijos (best Lithuanian book in 1994)
- Pasakos-nepasakos (poems for children, 1995)
- Obuolių pasakos (fairytales, 1999)
- Tik sapnininkas (poems, 2000)
- Angelų pasakos (fairytales, 2003)
- Arklio Dominyko meilė (fairytales, best Lithuanian children's book in 2004)
- Lunatikų dainos (poems, 2004)
- Pelytė Zita (fairytales, 2005)
- Žuveliukas (fairytale, 2005)
- Berniukas ir žuvėdros (short story, 2005)
- Tinginių pasakos (fairytales, 2006)
- Julijos sapnai (fairytales, 2006)
- Kiaušinių pasakos (poems for children, 2006)
- Briedis Eugenijus (fairytales, 2007)
- Šisbeitas (assay collection, 2007)
- Debesys panašūs į žmones (poem collection, 2007)
- Arklio Dominyko kelionė į žvaigždes (fairytales, 2007)
- Kiškis Pranciškus (fairytales, 2007)
- Gediminas ir keturi seneliai (fairytales, 2007)
- Obuolių pasakos ir kriaušių (fairytales, 4th edition with additions, 2008)
- Kaip pelytė Zita pasaulį išgelbėjo (fairytales, 2009)
- Varlė Bunkeryje (2010)
- Stebuklingas Dominyko brangakmenis (fairytales, best Lithuanian children's book in 2011)
- Kiškis Pranciškus be abejo (fairytales, 2012)

== Theater ==
- Komunistinės nostalgijos (kartu su L. Jakimavičium, Šėpos teatras, 1992)
- Kelionė į Pasaulio galą (Lėlės teatras, 1993)
- Iš gyvenimo vėlių (kartu su S. Parulskiu, Šiaulių dramos teatras, spektaklis apdovanotas dviem Kristoforais, 1995)
- Kalėdų bobutės pasaka (Keistuolių teatras, 2001)
- Daktaras ir Mangaryta (Šiaulių dramos teatras, spektaklis apdovanotas specialia KM premija už geriausią metų lietuvių dramaturgijos pastatymą, 2002)
- Intymi išpažintis (pagal I. Bergmaną, Šiaulių dramos teatras, 2003)
- Lelijos romansas (kartu su A. Ališausku, pagal Boriso Vijano romaną, Šiaulių dramos teatras, 2004)
- Pelytė Zita (Keistuolių teatras, 2005) nacionalinės dramaturgijos festivalyje Versmė apdovanotas už geriausio spektaklio vaikams pastatymą (2006)
- Vilis (apie V. Orvidą, Lėlės teatras, 2005)
- Kiauliaganys (Kauno dramos teatras, 2005)
- Eglė Žalčių karalienė (Klaipėdos dramos teatras, 2006))
- Bunkeris (Nacionalinis dramos teatras, 2008) Baltijos šalių teatrų festivalyje pelnęs geriausio režisieriaus nominaciją
- Briedis Eugenijus (Domino teatras, 2008)
- Išėjau aš stotin (Keistuolių teatras, 2009)
- Angelų pasakos (Jaunimo teatras, 2010)
- Atėjau, pamačiau, negalėjau (Laimingi Žmonės, 2011)
