= Gensan Punch =

2021 Philippine Japanese biographical film

- Promotional poster
- Directed by: Brillante Mendoza
- Written by: Honeylyn Joy Alipio
- Produced by: Takahiro Yamashita; Krisma Maclang Fajardo
- Starring: Shogen; Ronnie Lazaro; Kaho Minami
- Production companies: Center Stage Productions; Gentle Underground Monkeys
- Distributed by: SC Films International
- Release date: October 9, 2021 (BIFF)
- Running time: 110 minutes
- Countries: Philippines; Japan
- Languages: English; Filipino; Cebuano; Japanese

Gensan Punch is a 2021 Philippine-Japanese sports biographical film directed by Brillante Mendoza. Starring Shogen, Ronnie Lazaro and Kaho Minami. It is based on a true story that depicts Nao Tsuyama, a disabled athlete who refuses to let his artificial leg hinder his dream to become a professional boxer. It premiered at the 26th Busan International Film Festival (BIFF) on October 9, 2021.

== Cast ==
- Shogen as Naozumi "Nao" Tsuyama
- Beauty Gonzalez as Melissa
- Ronnie Lazaro as Coach Rudy
- Kaho Minami as Nao's mother
- Jeffrey Rowe as Nao's father
- Jun Nayra as Coach Ben
- Pow Salud as Ring Announcer

== Production ==
Gensan Punch is an internationally co-produced film made by Center Stage Productions of the Philippines and Gentle Underground Monkeys of Japan. It was directed by Brillante Mendoza. This is Mendoza's first sports biographical film. The film was created and written by Honey Alipio. Takahiro Yamashita and Krisma Maclang Fajardo were the producers.

=== Themes and inspiration ===
The film is inspired from the biography of Naozumi Tsuyama, a Japanese boxer with a prosthetic leg who went to the Philippines and became known as Gensan. Gensan is also the nickname of General Santos, a city which has produced numerous Filipino boxers including Manny Pacquiao. Tsuyama due to his disability was barred from pursuing a professional career in Japan by authorities due to safety reasons. He went to the Philippines and won a match in 2006 which was instrumental to him obtaining a pro boxing license. He would retire in 2015, without participating in a professional match in Japan.

Mendoza had no prior knowledge of Tsuyama. The director went to Tokyo to meet Tsuyama and other Japanese boxers and also went to Okinawa, the boxer's hometown. The production team also went to the gymnasium in General Santos where Tsuyama trained and talked with the local boxers in the area as part of the production process. Mendoza had an impression that Japanese boxers fight for honor and prestige, a different motivation to their Filipino counterparts.

Mendoza considers his work on Gensan Punch is a deviation from his previous works he has described as "alternative cinema" and considers the film as "mainstream". For Gensan Punch he said he had to tap to his previous experience in the advertising industry where the creative process is "different, if not more rigorous" and considers more about the audience when making media – in contrast to the process in making "alternate films" where the story, rhetoric and philosophy had more weight. The film did not focus on the technicalities of boxing, instead Mendoza decided to highlight Tsuyama's "journey as a disabled boxer".

=== Filming ===
Filming took place both Japan and the Philippines. Filming locations in Japan include Okinawa and Fukuoka. Some scenes in Japan were filmed during the COVID-19 pandemic but scenes involving large crowds were taken prior to the pandemic. Working with Japanese actors, Mendoza used a "non-scripted method" and the boxing bouts had no choreography.

== Release ==
Gensan Punch premiered at the 26th Busan International Film Festival (BIFF) on October 9, 2021. United Kingdom-based SC Films International is the distributor of the film.

The film will also be released as HBO Asia original movie.

== Reception ==
Gensan Punch was awarded the Kim Jiseok Award at the 26th Busan International Film Festival.

=== Award and nomination ===
Year	Award	Category	Recipient/ Nominee	Result	Ref.
2021	26th Busan International Film Festival	Kim Jiseok award	Gensan Punch	Won	
