= Bad Poetry Tokyo =

- 東京不穏詩
- Directed by: Anshul Chauhan
- Written by: Anshul Chauhan; Rand Cotler
- Produced by: Anshul Chauhan
- Starring: Nana Blank; Shuna Iijima; Kento Furukoshi
- Cinematography: Maxim Golomidov
- Edited by: Anshul Chauhan
- Music by: Gotal Bournier; Vieux Ralouf
- Production company: Kowatanda Films
- Release date: March 13, 2018 (Japan)
- Running time: 116 minutes
- Country: Japan
- Language: Japanese

Bad Poetry Tokyo (東京不穏詩) is a 2018 Japanese crime drama romance thriller film written, directed, produced, and edited by Anshul Chauhan that stars Nana Blank, Kento Furukoshi, and Shuna Iijima. Bad Poetry Tokyo is Chauhan's debut film. The film is about abuse against women.

== Plot summary ==
Fujita Jun (Shuna Iijima), a 30-year-old woman living in Tokyo who works as a hostess at a club and dreams of becoming an actress. Betrayed by her lover (Orson Mochizuki) and having her dreams crushed, she decides to leave Tokyo for her hometown in the countryside after five years of no contact with her family (Kôhei Mashiba). There, she reconnects with them but is also forced to confront some unpleasant truths about her past.

== Cast ==
- Nana Blank as Nana
- Shuna Iijima as Fujita Jun
- Kento Furukoshi
- Takashi Kawaguchi as Yuki
- Ilana Labourene as Bar Girl
- Kôhei Mashiba as Father
- Orson Mochizuki as Taka
- Taichi Yamada as Bar Owner
- Shintaro Yonemoto as Taka's friend

== Release ==
Bad Poetry Tokyo screened at the Raindance Film Festival. Bad Poetry Tokyo was entered into the Feature Film category at the Beverly Hills Film Festival.

== Reception ==
Shuna Iijima won Best Actress at the Osaka Asian Film Festival for her performance as Fujita Jun. Bad Poetry Tokyo won the Grand Prize for Best Film at the Brussels Independent Film Festival and Anshul Chauhan won the Best Narrative Feature Film at the Venice Film Week.

Bad Poetry Tokyo was nominated for the Grand Prix award for Best Film at the Osaka Asian Film Festival but did not win.
