= 26th Busan International Film Festival =

2021 edition of film festival

- BIFF official poster
- Opening film: Heaven: To the Land of Happiness by Im Sang-soo
- Closing film: Anita by Longman Leung
- Location: Busan Cinema Center
- Founded: 1995
- Awards: New Currents Award; The Apartment with Two Women; Farewell, My Hometown; Kim Jiseok Awards; The Rapist; Gensan Punch; Korean Cinema Award; Lee Choon-yun; The Asian Filmmaker of the Year; Im Kwon-taek
- Hosted by: Supported by: Ministry of Culture, Sports and Tourism; Metropolitan City of Busan; Korean Film Council
- No. of films: 223 films from 70 countries
- Festival date: Opening: October 6, 2021; Closing: October 15, 2021
- Website: BIFF 2021

Busan International Film Festival
- 27th 25th

The 26th Busan International Film Festival opened on October 6, 2021 at the Busan Cinema Center in Busan, South Korea with the South Korean film Heaven: To the Land of Happiness by Im Sang-soo. Park So-dam and Song Joong-ki hosted the opening of the festival, which was streamed live on YouTube.

In the 26th edition, 223 films from 70 countries were officially invited to the festival. 63 community service screenings were also part of the festival. In addition, this year BIFF opened two special programs, ‘New Voices, Chinese Films’ dedicated to emerging, talented Chinese directors, and the best Asian films by female directors, ‘Wonder Women Movies’, to highlight the contribution of female directors to the world of cinema. This edition of festival has constituted a new award 'Watcha Award' to be awarded to two selected films screened in the 'New Currents' section and the 'Korean Cinema Today-Vision' section. 22 short films official invited to the 'Wide Angle' competition section were screened online on YouTube and Naver.

'Vision Night' awards ceremony was held on October 14 in which winners of 'Korean Cinema Today - Vision Section' were announced. On October 15 in an online press conference the winners of 'New Currents' and other awards were announced and it was informed that 76,072 people visited the film festival in ten days. The festival closed on October 15 with closing ceremony hosted by Lee Joon-hyuk and Lee Joo-young and screening of film Anita by Longman Leung. South Korean film The Apartment with Two Women by Kim Se-in won five awards, including New Currents award.

== Jury ==
=== New Currents (competition section) ===
- Deepa Mehta, Indian-Canadian, international master director, screenwriter, Head Juror
- Christina Nord, section head of the Berlinale Forum
- Jeong Jae-eun, South Korean film director

=== Kim Jiseok Award ===
- Reza Mirkarimi, Iranian film writer and director (Jury Chairman)
- Gulnara Abikiyeva, Kazakhstani film critic and professor
- Kim Haery, member of the editorial board of the film magazine Cine21 and film critic

=== BIFF Mecenat Award ===
- Nanfu Wang, Chinese-born American filmmaker
- Park Kyung-geun, director
- Mandy Marahimin, Indonesian film producer

=== Sonje Award ===
- Bastian Mayraison, France, Asian film consultant at various film festivals around the world (Executive Chairman, Terres d’Ici, Terres d’ailleurs)
- Royston Tan, Singaporean filmmaker, director, screenwriter, producer and actor
- Danbi Yoon, South Korean filmmaker

=== Actor and Actress of the Year ===
- Uhm Jung-hwa, South Korean singer, actress and dancer
- Cho Jin-woong, South Korean actor

=== FIPRESCI Award ===
- Nada Azhari Gillon, French film critic
- Wang Hsin, Taiwanese film critic
- Kim Nemo, Korean film critic

=== NETPAC Award ===
- Freddy Olsson, Swedish Senior Programmer, Göteborg Film Festival
- Mevlut Akkaya, Turkish/American director
- Yoo Sun-Hee, Korean Chairperson, Beautiful Hapcheon Independent Film Festival (BHIFF)

=== DGK MEGABOX Award ===
- Kim Jae-han, Korean director
- Jang Cheol-soo, Korean director

=== KBS Independent Film Award ===
- Kim Mu-ryeong, Korean producer
- Darcy Paquet, American film critic, translator
- Lee Jong-pil, Korea, director

=== CGK Award ===
- Kim Byeong-jeong, Korean cinematographer
- Back Yoon-seuk, Korean cinematographer
- Lee Seon-yeong, Korean cinematographer

=== Critic Award ===
- Gim Jiye-on, Korean film critic
- Park In-ho, Korean film critic
- Hong Eun-mi, Koream film critic

== Program sections ==
The festival has the following sections:

- Gala Presentation
- Icons
- New Currents
- A Window on Asian Cinema
- Korean Cinema Today Panorama
- Korean Cinema Today Vision Section
- World Cinema
- Flash Forward
- Wide Angle
- Open Cinema
- Special Program in Focus
  - New Voices, Chinese Films
  - Wonder Women Movies
- On Screen: This showcases traditional theatrical releases and over the top media service (OTT) drama series as world premieres or Asia premieres.

=== Opening and closing films ===
Year	English title	Original title	Director(s)	Production countrie(s)
Opening film
2020	Heaven: To the Land of Happiness	헤븐: 행복의 나라로	Im Sang-soo	South Korea
Closing film
2021	Anita	梅艷芳	Longman Leung	Hong Kong

=== Gala Presentation ===
Year	English title	Original title	Director(s)	Production countrie(s)
2021	Annette		Leos Carax	France
2021	Drive My Car	ドライブ・マイ・カー	Ryusuke Hamaguchi	Japan
2021	Wheel of Fortune and Fantasy	偶然と想像	Ryusuke Hamaguchi	Japan

=== Icons ===
English title	Original title	Director(s)	Production countrie(s)
Ahed's Knee		Nadav Lapid	Israel, France, Germany
Bergman Island		Mia Hansen-Løve	France, Belgium, Germany, Sweden, Mexico
Cow		Andrea Arnold	United Kingdom
Deception	Tromperie	Arnaud Desplechin	France
Everything Went Fine	Tout s'est bien passé	François Ozon	France
France		Bruno Dumont	France, Germany, Belgium
The French Dispatch		Wes Anderson	United States
Funny Boy		Deepa Mehta	Canada
The Hand of God	È stata la mano di Dio	Paolo Sorrentino	Italy
A Hero	قهرمان	Asghar Farhadi	Iran, France
In Front of Your Face	당신얼굴 앞에서	Hong Sang-soo	South Korea
Introduction	인트로덕션	Hong Sang-soo	South Korea
Lingui, the Sacred Bonds	Lingui	Mahamat-Saleh Haroun	Chad, France, Belgium, Germany
Marx Can Wait	Marx può aspettare	Marco Bellocchio	Colombia, Taiwan, France, Germany, Mexico, Qatar
One Second	一秒钟	Zhang Yimou	China, Hong Kong
The Power of the Dog		Jane Campion	New Zealand, Australia
Red Rocket		Sean Baker	United States
Sundown		Michel Franco	Mexico, France, Sweden
Three Floors	Tre piani	Nanni Moretti	Italy, France
The Tsugua Diaries	Diários de Otsoga	Miguel Gomes, Maureen Fazendeiro	Portugal, France
Vortex		Gaspar Noé	France
Yanagawa		Zhang Lü	China

=== New Currents ===
This is the main competition section at BIFF, and showcases works by emerging Asian directors.

Highlighted title indicates award winner

English title	Original title	Director(s)	Production countrie(s)
The Absent Director		Arvand Dashtaray	Iran
The Apartment with Two Women	같은 속옷을 입는 두 여자	Kim Se-in	South Korea
Asteroid		Mehdi Hoseinivand Aalipour	Iran
Farewell, My Hometown		Wang Er Zhou	China
Kalkokkho	কালকোকখো	Rajdeep Paul, Sarmistha Maiti	India
Memoryland	Miền Ký Ức	Kim Quy Bui	Vietnam, Germany
Missing		Katayama Shinzo	Japan
Pedro		Natesh Hegde	India
Photocopier	Penyalin Cahaya	Wregas Bhanuteja	Indonesia
Red Pomegranate		Sharipa Urazbayeva	Kazakhstan
Seire	세이레	Park Kang	South Korea

=== A Window on Asian Cinema ===
Seven films were selected to compete for the Kim Jiseok award:

English title	Original title	Director(s)	Production countrie(s)
24		Royston Tan	Singapore, Thailand
The Bargain		Wang Ki	China
Gensan Punch		Brillante Mendoza	Philippines
No Land's Man		Mostofa Sarwar Farooki	United States, Bangladesh, India
The Rapist		Aparna Sen	India
Riverside Mukolitta	川っぺりムコリッタ	Naoko Ogigami	Japan
Sughra and Her Sons	Suğra və oğulları	Ilgar Najaf	Azerbaijan, France, Germany

==== Out of competition ====
These films were screened 'out of competition' as part of A Window on Asian Cinema:

English title	Original title	Director(s)	Production countrie(s)
Anatomy of Time		Jakrawal Nilthamrong	Thailand, France, Singapore, Netherlands
Annular Eclipse		Zhang Chi	China
Are You Lonesome Tonight?	热带往事	Wen Shipei	China
Ballad of a White Cow	قصیده گاو سفید	Behtash Sanaeeha, Maryam Moqadam	Iran, France
Days Before the Millennium		Chang Teng-Yuan	Taiwan
Deep6		Madhuja Mukherjee	India
The Exam	Ezmûn	Shawkat Amin Korki	Iraq, Germany, Qatar, Kurdistan
The Falls	瀑布	Chung Mong-hong	Taiwan
Farha		Darin J. Sallam	Jordan, Sweden, Saudi Arabia
Fire		Aizhana Kassymbek	Kazakhstan
Haruhara-san's Recorder	春原さんのうた	Kyoshi Sugita	Japan
Huda's Salon		Hany Abu-Assad	Palestine, Egypt, Netherlands
In the Wake		Takahisa Zeze	Japan
Increasing Echo		Chienn Hsiang	Taiwan
Inu-Oh	犬王	Masaaki Yuasa	Japan, China
Moneyboys	尋找	C.B. Yi	Austria, France, Belgium, Taiwan
A New Old Play	椒麻堂會	Qiu Jiongjiong	Hong Kong, France
No Ground Beneath the Feet	পায়ের তলায় মাটি নাই	Mohammad Rabby Mridha	Bangladesh
On the Job: The Missing 8		Erik Matti	Philippines
Rehana		Abdullah Mohammad Saad	Bangladesh, Singapore, Qatar
The Road to Kuthriyar		Bharat Mirle	India
Shankar's Fairies		Irfana Majumdar	India
Taste	Vị	Le Bao	Vietnam
Tengiz		Mansur Abdukhalikov	Uzbekistan
Vengeance Is Mine, All Others Pay Cash	Seperti Dendam, Rindu Harus Dibayar Tuntas	Edwin	Indonesia, Singapore, Germany
White Building	ប៊ូឌីញ ស	Kavich Neang	Cambodia, France, China, Qatar
Yuni		Kamila Andini	Indonesia, Singapore

=== Korean Cinema Today - Panorama Section ===
English title	Original title	Director(s)
The Book of Fish	자산어보	Lee Joon-ik
The Cave		Lee Young-ah
Chun Tae-il	태일이	Hong Jun-pyo
The Contorted House	뒤틀린 집	Kang Dong-hun
The Cursed: Dead Man's Prey	방법: 재차의	Kim Yong-wan
Fairy	요정	Shin Tack-su
The Girl on a Bulldozer	불도저에 탄 소녀	Park Ri-woong
Last Film		Jeon Soo-il
New Year Blues	새해전야	Hong Ji-Young
Night in Paradise	낙원의 밤	Park Hoon-jung
Sinkhole	싱크홀	Kim Ji-hoon
Space Sweepers	승리호	Jo Sung-hee
Unframed	언프레임드	Park Jeong-min, Son Seok-koo, Choi Hee-seo, Lee Je-hoon
Usu		Oh Sehyeon

=== Korean Cinema Today - Vision Section ===
In 2021 this was expanded to 12 selections and showcased as world premiere.

Highlighted title indicates award winner

English title	Original title	Director(s)
A Bit Different	한 끗	Lee Woo-dong
Chorokbam	초록밤	Yoon Seo-jin
The Conversation	컨버세이션	Kim Dukjoong
Doom Doom	둠둠	Jung Wonhee
Film for the Coming Winter	올 겨울에 찍을 영화	Kim Kyung-rae
Hot in Day, Cold at Night	낮에는 덥고 밤에는 춥고	Park Song-yeol
A Lonely Island in the Distant Sea	절해고도	Kim Miyoung
No Surprise	모퉁이	Shin Sun
Nobody's Lover	만인의 연인	Han In-mi
Not One and Not Two	벗어날 탈 脫	Seoh-hyeong
Sophie's World	소피의 세계	Lee Jea-han
Through My Midwinter	그 겨울, 나는	Oh Seong-ho

=== World Cinema ===
English title	Original title	Director(s)	Production countrie(s)
(Im)Patient		Constanza Fernández	Chile
After Blue (Dirty Paradise)	After Blue (Paradis sale)	Bertrand Mandico	France
Ali & Ava		Clio Barnard	United Kingdom
Amparo		Simón Mesa Soto	Colombia, Sweden, Qatar
As in Heaven	Du som er i himlen	Tea Lindeburg	Denmark
Bad Luck Banging or Loony Porn	Babardeala cu bucluc sau porno balamuc	Radu Jude	Romania, Luxembourg, Czech Republic, Croatia
The Blind Man Who Did Not Want to See Titanic	Sokea mies, joka ei halunnut nähdä Titanicia	Teemu Nikki	Finland
Blue Bayou		Justin Chon	United States
Brigitte Bardot Forever		Lech Majewski	Poland
Captain Volkonogov Escaped	Капитан Волконогов бежал	Natalya Merkulova, Alexey Chupov	Russia, Estonia, France
A Chiara		Jonas Carpignano	Italy
Cop Secret	Leynilöggan	Hannes Þór Halldórsson	Iceland
Deserted		Kadri Kõusaar	Estonia, Sweden, Finland
Dusk Stone		Iván Fund	Argentina, Chile, Spain
Fabian – Going to the Dogs	Fabian oder Der Gang vor die Hunde	Dominik Graf	Germany, France
The Family		Dan Slater	Canada
The Girl and the Spider	Das Mädchen und die Spinne	Ramon Zürcher, Silvan Zürcher	Switzerland
Good Mother	Bonne mère	Hafsia Herzi	France
Great Freedom	Große Freiheit	Sebastian Meise	Austria, Germany
Hive	Zgjoi	Blerta Basholli	Kosovo, Switzerland, North Macedonia, Albania
Hold Me Tight	Serre-moi fort	Mathieu Amalric	France, Germany
House Arrest	Дело	Aleksei Alekseivich German	Russia
Il buco		Michelangelo Frammartino	Italy, Germany, France
Întregalde		Radu Muntean	Romania
The Island	Insula	Anca Damian	Romania, Belgium, France
Magnetic Beats	Les magnétiques	Vincent Maël Cardona	France
Nitram		Justin Kurzel	Australia
The Odd-Job Men	Sis dies corrents	Neus Ballús	Spain
Passing		Rebecca Hall	United States
Reflection	Відблиск	Valentyn Vasyanovych	Ukraine
Small Body	Piccolo corpo	Laura Samani	Italy, France, Slovenia
The Souvenir		Joanna Hogg	United Kingdom
The Souvenir Part II		Joanna Hogg	United Kingdom
A Tale of Love and Desire	Une histoire d'amour et de désir	Leyla Bouzid	France
Titane		Julia Ducournau	France
Vanishing		Denis Dercourt	France, South Korea
The Worst Person in the World	Verdens verste menneske	Joachim Trier	Norway

=== Flash Forward ===
From this edition, this section has the films that have already won awards or become a hot topic at other film festivals.

Highlighted title indicates award winner

English title	Original title	Director(s)	Production countrie(s)
Compartment No. 6		Juho Kuosmanen	Finland, Germany, Estonia, Russia
El Planeta		Amalia Ulman	Spain
Feathers	ريش	Omar El Zohairy	France, Egypt, Netherlands, Greece
Freaks Out		Gabriele Mainetti	Italy, Belgium
Jockey		Clint Bentley	United States
Mass		Fran Kranz	United States
Onoda: 10,000 Nights in the Jungle	Onoda (10.000 nuits dans la jungle)	Arthur Harari	France, Japan, Germany, Belgium, Italy, Cambodia
Prayers for the Stolen	Noche de fuego	Tatiana Huezo	Mexico, Germany, Brazil, Qatar
What Do We See When We Look at the Sky?	რას ვხედავთ, როდესაც ცას ვუყურებთ?	Alexandre Koberidze	Georgia, Germany

=== Wide Angle ===
==== Korean Short Film Competition ====
English title	Original title	Director(s)
All Is Well, Fighting!	그래도, 화이팅!	Kim Jun-seok
Anthill	개미무덤	Lee Sol-hui
The Blank	공백	Shin Si-jeong
Errand		Lee Youngwoong
Gut: Exorcism		Park So-e
Outing	나들이	Lee Yujin
Source of the Odour		Kim Hyoeun
Stay Over Night		Lee Jihoo
Suicidal Student		Park Jun-hyeok
Take Me Home, Country Roads		Jeon Shi-hyoung
We Have to Love Each Other	우리는 서로 사랑해야 한다	Lee Ru-ri
A Winter Glove		Lee Hyeonju

==== Asian Short Film Competition ====
English title	Original title	Director(s)	Production country(s)
Cloudy Man		Shahin Jalali	Iran
Good Day		Zhang Zhi-Teng	Taiwan
Paanha		Hemant Kudale	India
Salvador Dali		Eldiar Madakim	Kyrgyzstan
Sarira		Li Mingyang	China
The Sea Calls for Me	Laut Memanggilku	Tumpal Tampubolon	Indonesia
The Third Solar Term		Song Zhanfei	China, United Kingdom
Why Is the Sky Dark at Night?		Kelzang Dorjee	Bhutan
Windows		Shigaya Daisuke	Japan
Yet Another Winter		Kiran Shrestha	Nepal

==== Nominees for Mecenat Award ====
Documentary Competition

10 nominations, consisting of five Korean and five Asian feature-length documentaries, were announced.

English title	Original title	Director(s)	Production countrie(s)
206: Unearthed	206: 사라지지 않는	Heo Cheol-nyeong	South Korea, Thailand
Crossing’s End		Shih Yu-Lun	Taiwan
Fanatic	성덕	Oh Se-yeon	South Korea
Kim Jong-boon of Wangshimni	왕십리 김종분	Kim Jin-yeol	South Korea
Ladies Only		Rebana Liz John	India
Names of Revolution	10월의 이름들	Lee Dong-yun	South Korea
Piano Prism	피아노 프리즘	Oh Jae-hyeong	South Korea
Self-Portrait: Fairy Tale in 47KM		Zhang Meng-Chi	China
The Taste of Wild Tomato		Lau Kek Huat	Taiwan
The Unnameable Dance		Isshin Inudo	Japan

==== Documentary Showcase ====
(Busan Cinephile Award nominees)
Highlighted title indicates award winner

English title	Original title	Director(s)	Production countrie(s)
An Actor Prepares by Gi Gukseo		Whang Cheolmean	South Korea
Faceless		Jennifer Ngo	Hong Kong, United States
I am More		Lee Ilha	Korea
I′m So Sorry		Zhao Liang	Hong Kong, France, Netherlands
Map without Island		Kim Sungeun	Korea
A Night of Knowing Nothing		Payal Kapadia	India, France
Odoriko	ヌード・アット・ハート (Nude at Heart)	Okutani Yoichiro	Japan, United States, France
Poets' Window		Kim Jeonhan	Korea
Rain in 2020		Lee Yong Chao	Taiwan, Myanmar
Steel Boat		Kim Jigon	Korea
Target		Nishijima Shinji	Japan

Out of competition

English title	Original title	Director(s)	Production countrie(s)
Artificial Immortality		Ann Shin	Canada
Django & Django		Luca Rea	Italy
The First Wave		Matthew Heineman	United States
Flee		Jonas Poher Rasmussen	Denmark, France
For Lucio	Per Lucio	Pietro Marcello	Italy
Mariner of the Mountains	O marinheiro das montanhas	Karim Aïnouz	Brazil, France, Germany
Returning to Reims (Fragments)	Retour à Reims (Fragments)	Jean-Gabriel Périot	France
Summer of Soul (...Or, When the Revolution Could Not Be Televised)		Ahmir "Questlove" Thompson	United States

=== Open Cinema ===
English title	Original title	Director(s)	Production countrie(s)
Benedetta		Paul Verhoeven	France, Belgium, Netherlands
Inexorable		Fabrice Du Welz	Belgium, France
Infernal Affairs		Andrew Lau, Alan Mak	Hong Kong, China
Last Night in Soho		Edgar Wright	United Kingdom
Mona Lisa and the Blood Moon		Ana Lily Amirpour	United States
Tokyo Revengers	東京卍リベンジャーズ	Tsutomu Hanabusa	Japan
What She Likes...	彼女が好きなものは	Shogo Kusano	Japan

=== On Screen ===
English title	Original title	Director(s)	Production countrie(s)	Platform/ Network
Hellbound	지옥	Yeon Sang-ho	South Korea	Netflix
My Name	마이 네임	Kim Jin-min	South Korea	Netflix
Forbidden		Anucha Boonyawatana, Josh Kim	HBO Asia's original Thai series	HBO Go

== Special program in focus ==
=== Wonder Women Movies ===
10 best Asian films by female directors were selected on the basis of responses from 117 film professionals in a span of one year:

Year	Rank	English title	Original title	Director(s)	Production countrie(s)
1988	1	Salaam Bombay!		Mira Nair	India, France, United Kingdom
2000	2	Blackboards	تخته سياه	Samira Makhmalbaf	Iran, Italy, Japan
2011	2	A Simple Life	桃姐	Ann Hui	Hong Kong
1995	4	The Murmuring	낮은 목소리	Byun Young-joo	South Korea
1997	5	Suzaku	萌の朱雀	Naomi Kawase	Japan
2000	6	The Day I Became a Woman	روزی که زن شدم	Marzieh Meshkini	Iran
2001	7	Take Care of My Cat	고양이를 부탁해	Jeong Jae-eun	South Korea
2017	8	Marlina the Murderer in Four Acts	Marlina si Pembunuh dalam Empat Babak	Mouly Surya	Indonesia, France, Malaysia, Thailand
2018	9	Capernaum	کفرناحوم	Nadine Labaki	Lebanon
2012	9	Wadjda	وجدة	Haifaa al-Mansour	Germany, Jordan, Netherlands, Saudi Arabia, United Arab Emirates, United States

=== New Voices, Chinese Films ===
Year	English title	Original title	Director(s)	Genre
2014	Black Coal, Thin Ice	白日焰火	Diao Yinan	Neo-noir
2015	Kaili Blues	路边野餐	Bi Gan	Drama, Mystery
2017	Walking Past the Future	路過未來	Li Ruijun	Drama
2019	Dwelling in the Fuchun Mountains	Chun jiang shui nuan	Gu Xiaogang	Drama
2020	The Cloud in Her Room	Ta fang jian li de yun	Zheng Lu Xinyuan	Drama
2020	The Calming	平静 (Ping Jing)	Song Fang	Drama
2021	Ripples of Life	Yong an zhen gu shi ji	Shujun Wei	Drama

== Awards and winners ==
Awards

The following awards will be presented at the 26th edition:

- The Asian Filmmaker of the Year
- Korean Cinema Award
- New Currents Award
- Kim Jiseok Award
- BIFF Mecenat Award
- Sonje Award
- Actor & Actress of the Year Award
  - Actor of the Year
  - Actress of the Year
- KB New Currents Audience Award
- Flash Forward Audience Award
- FIPRESCI Award
- NETPAC Award
- DGK MEGABOX Award
- CGV Arthouse Award
- KBS Independent Film Award
- CGK Award (Cinematographers Guild of Korea)
- Critic b Award
- Watcha Award from 2021
- Citizen Critics' Award
- Busan Cinephile Award

=== Winners ===
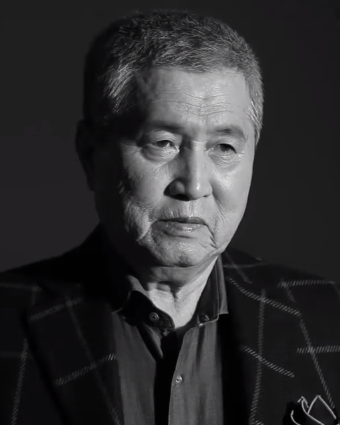
Im Kwon-taek, The Asian Filmmaker of the Year

Winner(s)	Work/ director	Notes	Ref.
The Asian Filmmaker of the Year
Im Kwon-taek		Honoured	
Korean Cinema Award
Lee Choon-yun		Honoured	
New Currents Award
The Apartment with Two Women	Kim Se-in		
Farewell, My Hometown	Wang Er Zhou		
Kim Jiseok Award
The Rapist	Aparna Sen	Joint winner	
Gensan Punch	Brillante Mendoza	Joint winner	
The Bargain	Wang Ki	Special mention	
BIFF Mecenat Award
206: Unearthed	Heo Cheol-nyeong	Korean section	
Self-Portrait: Fairy Tale in 47KM	Zhang Meng-Chi	Asia section	
Sonje Award
A Winter Glove	Lee Hyeonju	Joint winner	
The Sea Calls for Me	Tumpal Tampubolon	Joint winner	
Sarira	Li Mingyang	Special mention	
Actor of the year Award
Kwon Daham	Through My Midwinter		
Actress of the year Award
Lim Ji-ho	The Apartment with Two Women		
KB New Currents Audience Award
The Apartment with Two Women	Kim Se-in		
Flash Forward Audience Award
Mass	Fran Kranz		
NETPAC Award
The Apartment with Two Women	Kim Se-in		
FIPRESCI Award
Seire	Park Kang		
Busan Cinephile Award
I′m So Sorry	Zhao Liang		
CGK Award
Choo Kyeong-yeob	Chorokbam		
DGK MEGABOX Award
Through My Midwinter	Oh Seong-ho		
A Lonely Island in the Distant Sea	Kim Miyoung		
Critic b Award
Hot in Day, Cold at Night	Park Song-yeol		
CGV Arthouse Award
Chorokbam	Yoon Seo-jin		
KBS Independent Film Award
Hot in Day, Cold at Night	Park Song-yeol		
Watcha Award
Through My Midwinter	Oh Seong-ho		
The Apartment with Two Women	Kim Se-in		
Citizen Critics' Award
Chorokbam	Yoon Seo-jin		

== See also ==
- List of film festivals in South Korea
- Busan
  - Haeundae-gu, Busan
