= Yoo Ah-in filmography =

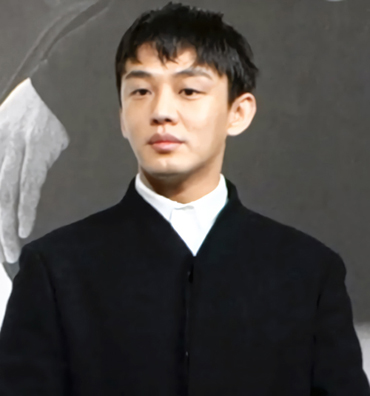
- Yoo in January 2019
- Film: 20
- Television series: 14
- Web series: 2
- Television show: 5
- Music videos: 5
- Others: 1

Yoo Ah-in (Korean: 유아인; born October 6, 1986) is a South Korean actor, creative director, and gallerist. He is best known for his leading roles in coming-of-age film Punch (2011), melodrama Secret Affair (2014), action blockbuster Veteran (2015), period drama The Throne (2015), historical television series Six Flying Dragons (2015–2016), psychological thriller mystery drama Burning (2018), zombie film #Alive (2020), indie crime drama film Voice of Silence (2020), and dark fantasy series Hellbound (2021).

== Film ==
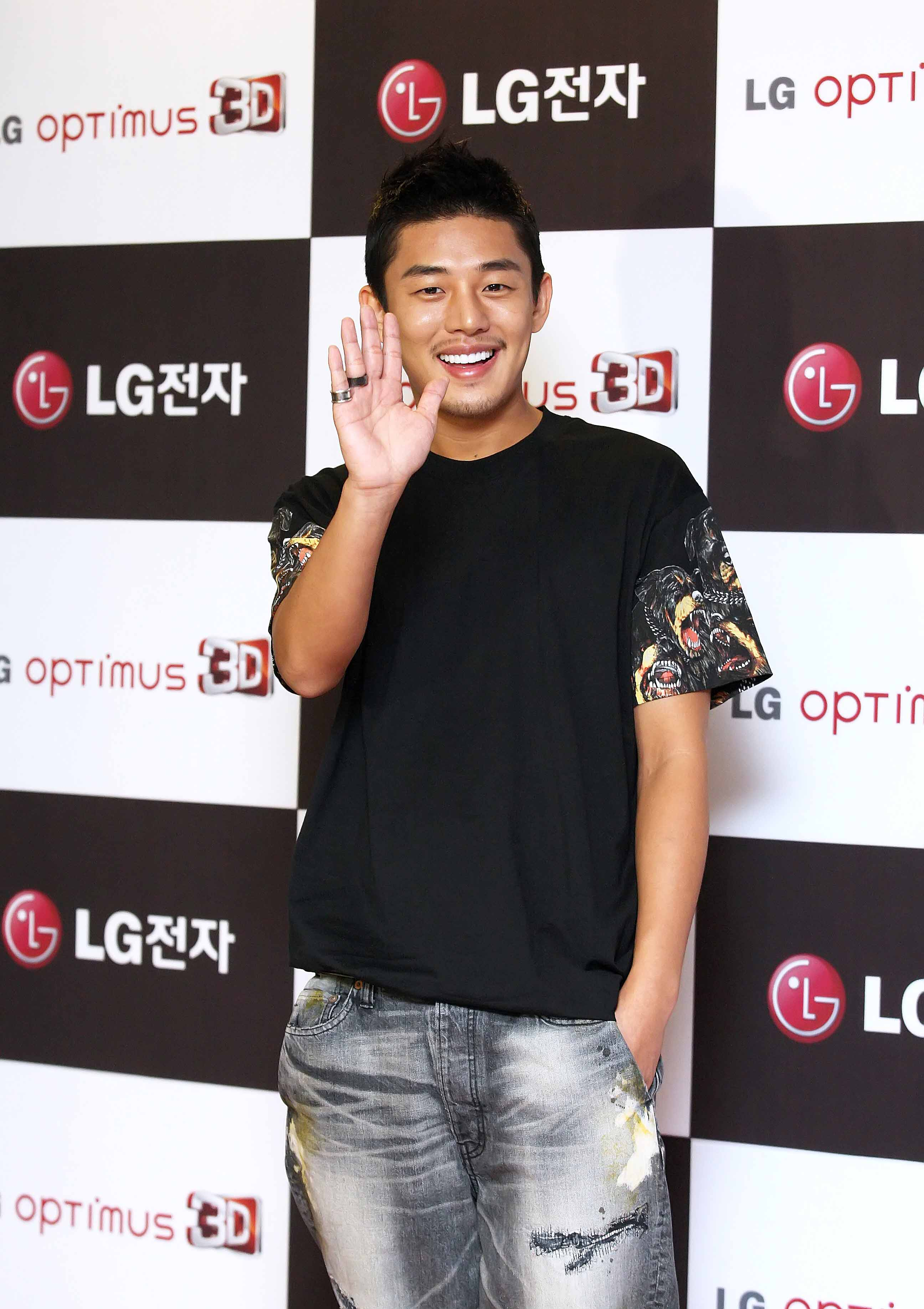
Yoo at the premiere of Transformers: Dark of the Moon in July 2011

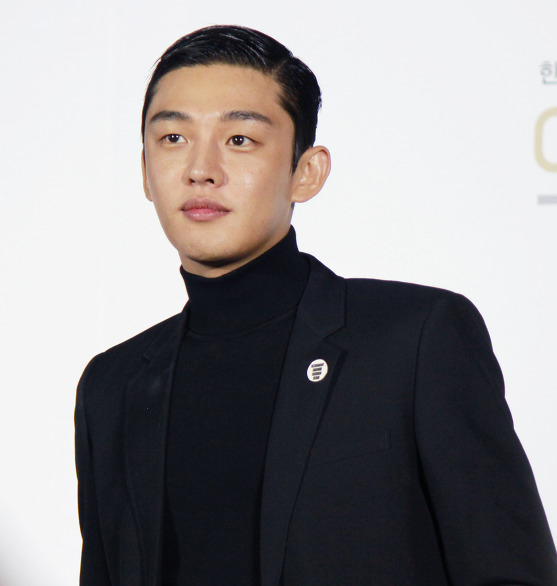
Yoo at the Busan International Film Festival in October 2015

Year	Title	Role	Notes	Ref.
2006	Boys of Tomorrow	Jeon Jong-dae		
2007	Skeletons in the Closet	Shim Yong-tae		
2008	Antique	Yang Ki-beom		
2009	Sky and Ocean	Jin-goo		
2011	Punch	Do Wan-deuk		
2013	Tough as Iron	Gang Cheol		
2014	The Satellite Girl and Milk Cow	Ko Kyung-chun / Milk Cow	Voice	
2014	Thread of Lies	Choo Sang-bak		
2015	Veteran	Jo Tae-oh		
2015	The Throne	Crown Prince Sado		
2016	Like for Likes	Noh Jin-woo		
2018	Burning	Lee Jong-su		
2018	Default	Yun Jeong-hak		
2019	Sender Unknown	Himself	Chinese short film	
2020	#Alive	Joon-woo		
2020	Voice of Silence	Tae-in		
2022	Seoul Vibe	Dong-wook		
2025	The Match	Lee Chang-ho		
2025	Hi-Five	Hwang Ki-dong		

== Television series ==
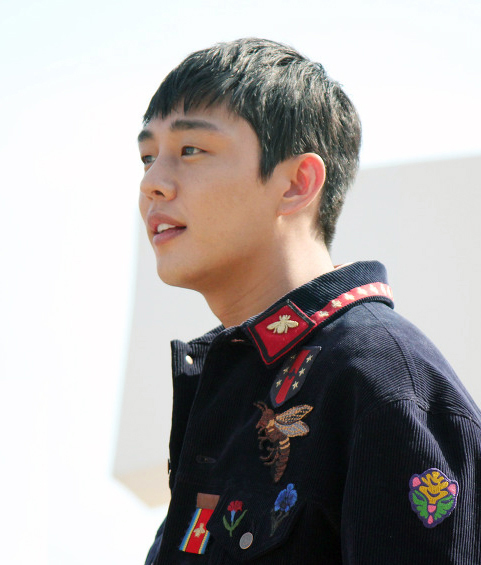
Yoo at the stage greeting for The Throne at the Busan International Film Festival in October 2015

Year	Title	Role	Notes	Ref.
2003	Honest Living	Man #2	Bit part (Episode 164)	
2004–2005	Sharp	Yoo Ah-in		
2004	April Kiss	16-year-old Kang Jae-sup	Cameo (Episode 1)	
2005	Drama City: "Shi-eun & Soo-ha"	Lee Min-suk		
2008	Strongest Chil Woo	Heuksan / Kim Hyuk		
2009	He Who Can't Marry	Park Hyun-kyu		
2010	Sungkyunkwan Scandal	Moon Jae-shin		
2012	Fashion King	Kang Young-gul		
2013	Jang Ok-jung, Living by Love	King Sukjong		
2014	Secret Affair	Lee Sun-jae		
2014	Discovery of Love	Woodworking class student	Cameo (Episode 16)	
2015–2016	Six Flying Dragons	Yi Bang-won		
2016	Descendants of the Sun	Bank teller Uhm Hong-sik	Cameo (Episode 13)	
2017	Chicago Typewriter	Han Se-joo / Seo Hwi-young		
2021	Hellbound	Jeong Jin-soo	Season 1	
2024	Goodbye Earth	Ha Yoon-sang		

== Television shows ==
Year	Title	Role	Notes	Ref.
2011	Yoo Ah-in's Launch My Life	Himself, music curator	Fashion/business reality show	
2014	Wan-deuk Who Wants to Fly	Narrator	Documentary	
2017	June Story	Narrator	Documentary commemorating 30th Anniversary of June Struggle	
2018	Eyewitnesses of Syria	Narrator	Documentary	
2019	Do-ol Ah-in Going All Directions	Host, co-writer, co-producer	Special show commemorating 100th Anniversary of March First Movement	

== Music video appearances ==
Year	Song title	Artist	Ref.
2004	"Footprints"	T.O	
2012	"Only One"	BoA	
2016	"ㅎㅎㅎ (Heung-boo)"	DJ Peggy Gou	
2019	"Starry Night"	DJ Peggy Gou	
2021	"자유 (Jayu)"	Se So Neon	

== Video games ==
Year	Title	Role	Company	Notes	Ref.
2016	Knights of Night	Bein, Rune	Netmarble	Also motion capture	
