= Kim Yeo-jin =

South Korean actress (born 1972)

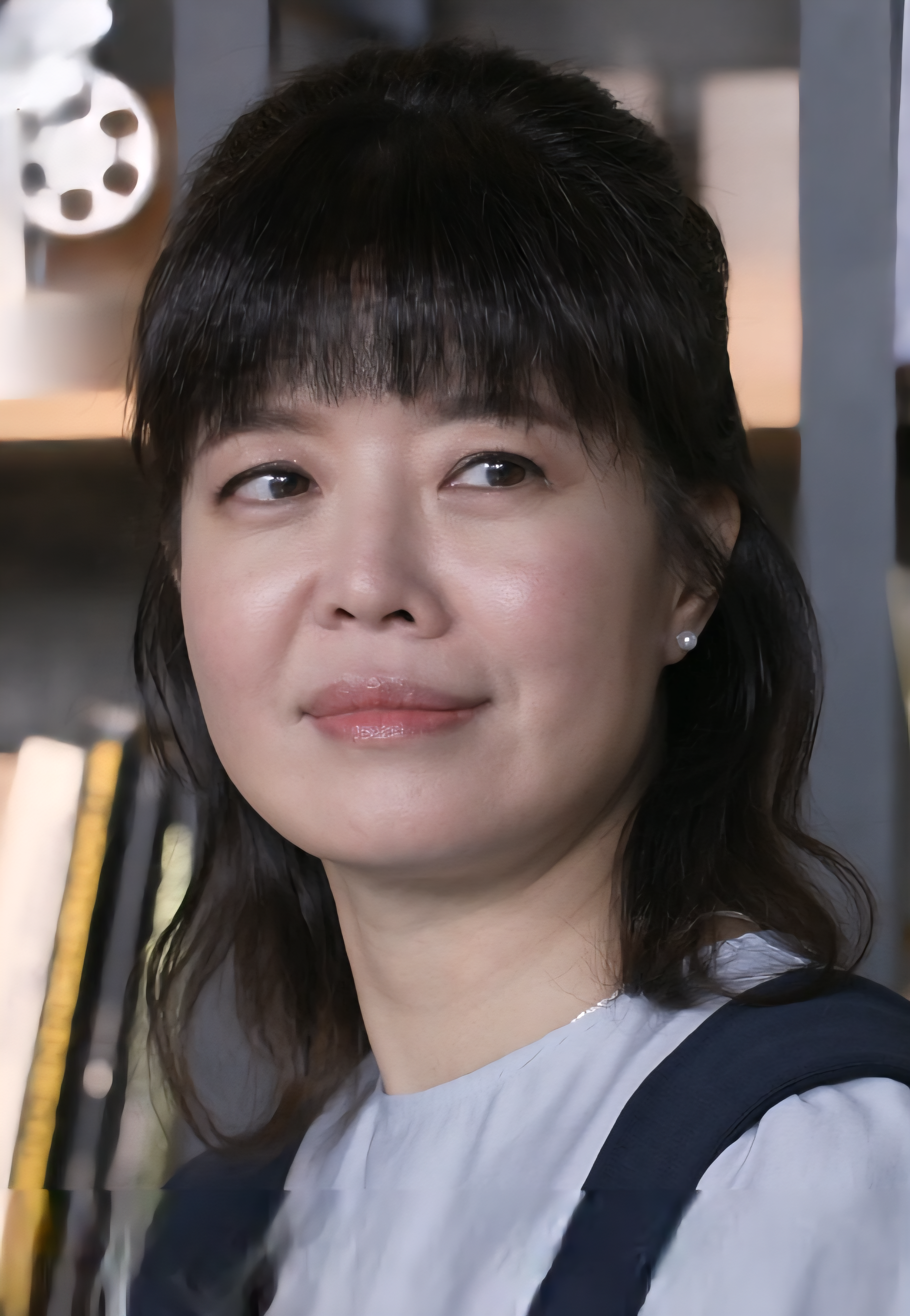
- Kim in December 2021
- Born: June 24, 1972 (age 54); Masan, South Gyeongsang, South Korea
- Education: Ewha Womans University
- Occupation: Actress
- Years active: 1995–present
- Agent: 935 Entertainment
- Spouse: Kim Jin-min (m. 2004)

Korean name
- Hangul: 김여진
- Hanja: 金麗珍
- RR: Gim Yeojin
- MR: Kim Yŏjin

Kim Yeo-jin (Korean: 김여진; born June 24, 1972) is a South Korean actress. She made her acting debut in the stage play What Do Women Live For in 1995, and has since remained active in film and television, drawing praise for her supporting roles in Im Sang-soo's Girls' Night Out (1998), Lee Chang-dong's Peppermint Candy (2000), and Im Kwon-taek's Chi-hwa-seon (2002). In 2021, she played Choi Myung-hee, a corrupt and manipulative lawyer in Vincenzo. Her latest endeavor was as Kwon Na-yeon in Beyond the Bar.

== Personal life ==
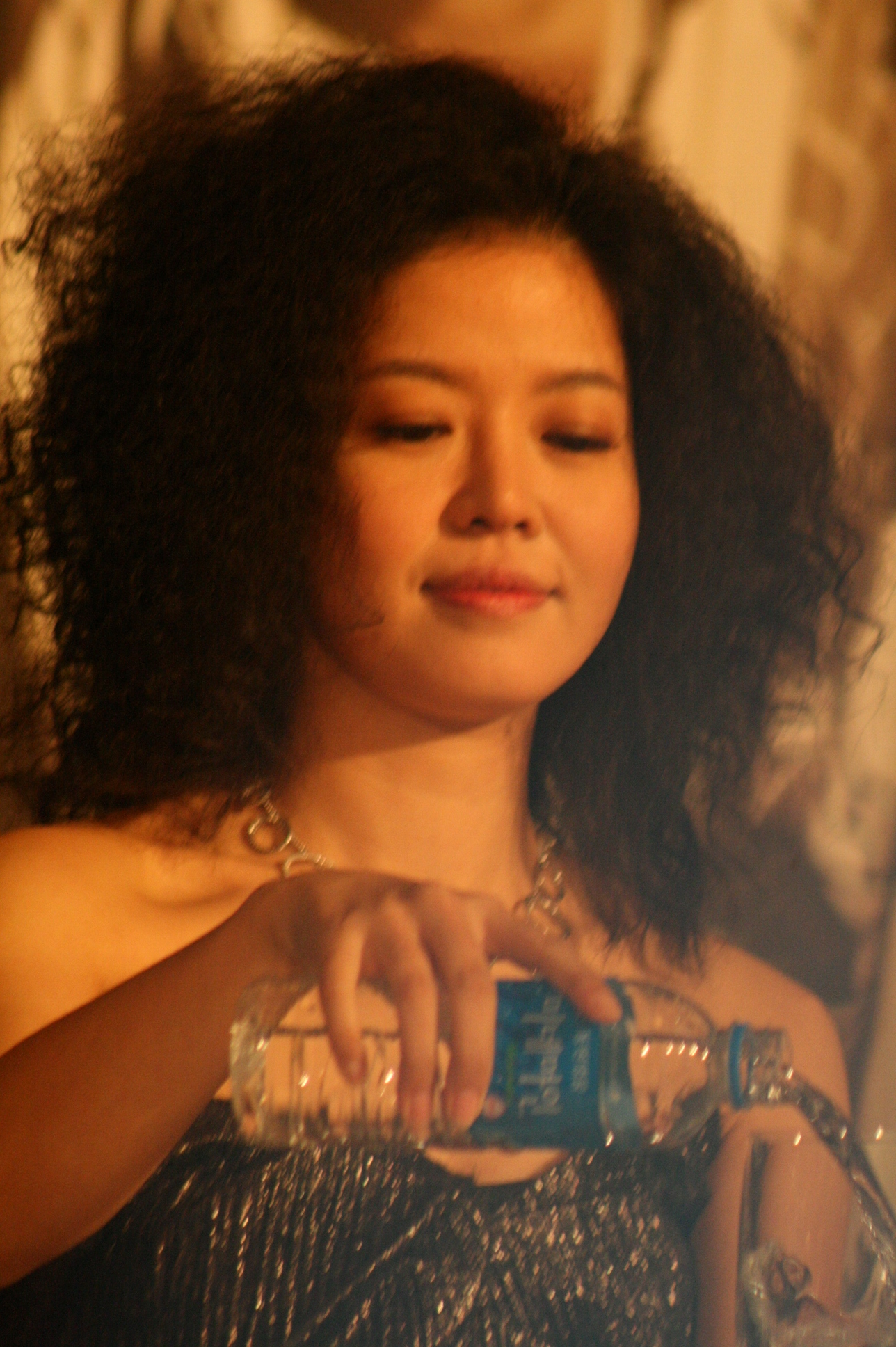
Kim in 2008

Kim Yeo-jin met her future husband, director Kim Jin-min, in 2003 on the set of Forever Love. They married in February 2004.

Kim is known for being actively engaged in various rallies and civic group activities, attracting public attention to controversial social and political issues, including efforts to reinstate laid-off shipbuilders at Hanjin Heavy Industries, calls to lower university tuition fees, and opposition to the Four Major Rivers Project. She often expresses her opinions on social networking service Twitter, and has been called one of the most popular socialtainers.

Because of her outspokenness, MBC banned Kim in 2011 (she was originally scheduled to appear as a "progressive" panelist on the current affairs radio show Sohn Suk-hee's Spotlight), which led to prominent figures from academic, literary and media circles to call for a boycott of the network's programs.

Kim has also campaigned for liberal politicians Roh Moo-hyun, Moon Jae-in and Park Won-soon.

== Filmography ==
=== Film ===
Year	Title	Role	Notes	Ref.
1998	Girls' Night Out	Soon	Main role	
1998	Illusion		short film	
1999	Peppermint Candy	Yang Hong-ja	Main role	
2002	Chi-hwa-seon	Jin-jong	Main role	
2002	A Perfect Match	Kim Hae-in		
2003	The Uninvited			
2003	A Good Lawyer's Wife	Eun Ho-Jung's friend		
2008	My New Partner	Jung Kyu-Hwa		
2009	Closer to Heaven	Dr. Son Young-Chan		
2010	Wedding Dress	Mi-Ja		
2010	Vegetarian	Ji-hye	Main role	
2010	Looking For My Wife	Shin Young-Shin		
2011	Children	Jung Ho's mother	Main role	
2011	Miracle	woman from Eonyang		
2012	Jinsuk & Me		documentary film	
2013	The Big Picture		documentary film	
2018	Last Child	Lee Mi-Sook	Main role	
2020	Heaven: To the Land of Happiness			
2024	Drive	Park Jeong-suk	Main role	

=== Television series ===
Year	Title	Role	Notes	Ref.
2000	The More I Love You	Song Ga-yeong		
2000	Secretary			
2001	Fox and Cotton Candy	Min Yeo-ok		
2002	That Woman Catches People	Yeo In-suk		
2002	I Love You, Hyun-jung			
2003	Forever Love	Lee Kwang-sook		
2003	Good Person	Detective Park's wife	Special Appearance	
2003	Jewel in the Palace	Jang-Deok		
2004	A Second Proposal			
2004	Toji, the Land			
2005	Smile of a Spring Day	Han Hyun-joo	Main role	
2005	I Love You, My Enemy	Yang Soon-ji		
2005	Shin Don	Princess Duk-Nyung		
2007	Blue Fish			
2007	Several Questions That Make Us Happy	Yeong-Chae	TV movies / main role	
2007	Lee San, Wind of the Palace	Queen Jung-sun		
2008	Worlds Within	Lee Seo-Woo		
2008	Amnok River Flows	Choi Mun-ho	Main role	
2010	Road No. 1	Dal Moon's wife	special appearance	
2010	Drama Special: "Red Candy"	Min-Jung		
2011	Listen to My Heart	Mi-Sook		
2014	Angel Eyes	Yoo Jung-Hwa		
2014	Lovers of Music	Coach Bang Ji-Sook		
2014	Tears of Heaven	Ban Hye-Jung		
2014	Pride and Prejudice	Oh Do-Jung		
2015	Splendid Politics	Kim Gae-Shi		
2015	Cheer Up!	Park Sun-Young		
2016	Love in the Moonlight	Kim So-Sa		
2016–2017	Solomon's Perjury	Seo-Yeon's mother		
2017	Man to Man	Prosecutor Lee's wife	special appearance, Ep. 15	
2017	Witch at Court	Min Ji-Sook		
2017	Drama Special: "Kang Duk-Soon's Love History"	Nam Hee-Soon	TV movies	
2018	My Secret Terrius	Shim Eun-Ha		
2018	Where Stars Land	Yoon Hye-Won		
2018	My Strange Hero	Im Se-Kyung		
2018	Children of Nobody	Kim Dong-Sook		
2019	Rookie Historian Goo Hae-ryung	Queen Im		
2020	Itaewon Class	Jo Jung-Min		
2020	Welcome	Sung Hyeon-Ja		
2021	Vincenzo	Choi Myung-Hee		
2023–2024	The Story of Park's Marriage Contract	Lee Mi-dam		
2025	Beyond the Bar	Kwon Na-Yeon		

=== Web series ===
Year	Title	Role	Ref.
2020	Extracurricular	Lee Hae-Kyung	

== Theater ==
Year	Title	Notes	Ref.
1995	What Do Women Live For		
2005	Closer		
2010	Love Letters		
2010	Please Look After Mom		
2011–2012	The Vagina Monologues		
2021	Mouthpiece		

== Bibliography ==
- 배운 녀자 (2011)
- 내가 걸은만큼 내 인생이다 (2011)
- Love Song (2012)

== Awards ==
Year	Award	Category	Nominated work	Result
1998	19th Blue Dragon Film Awards	Best New Actress	Girls' Night Out	Won
1999	7th Chunsa Film Art Awards	Best New Actress	Girls' Night Out	Won
2000	37th Grand Bell Awards	Best Supporting Actress	Peppermint Candy	Won
2002	3rd Busan Film Critics Awards	Best Supporting Actress	Chi-hwa-seon	Won
2011	20th Buil Film Awards	Best Supporting Actress	Children...	Won
