= Tears (film) =

- Theatrical poster
- Hangul: 눈물
- RR: Nunmul
- MR: Nunmul
- Directed by: Im Sang-soo
- Written by: Im Sang-soo
- Produced by: Oh Jung-wan
- Starring: Jun Han; Park Geun-yeong; Bong Tae-gyu; Jo Eun-ji; Sung Ji-ru
- Cinematography: Lee Doo-man
- Edited by: Yu Joo-hyeon
- Production company: B.O.M. Film Productions Co. Ltd.
- Release date: 2000
- Running time: 101 minutes
- Country: South Korea
- Language: Korean
- Budget: $1,000,000

Tears (Korean: 눈물) is a 2000 South Korean film written and directed by Im Sang-soo. It tells the story of 4 runaway teenagers in the Garibong-dong district of Seoul and their struggles to survive the tough streets.

Director Im had the idea for this film before he shot his first film, Girls' Night Out. He spent 5 months in the Garibong-dong district amongst the homeless runaway teenagers gaining their trust and learning their lives before putting pen to paper on the screenplay. It was shot on digital video to save production costs, and did not do well at the box office.

== Plot ==
Han, a young runaway, and Chang, an over-the-top teen, are close friends. Chang is a foulmouthed, womanizer while Han is a quiet and humble virgin. As they venture into the streets of Garibong-dong and jump from apartment to apartment, they encounter a young hooker, Lan, and Seri, a paint-sniffing young woman who finds comfort in the hands of Han. And this forms the unlikely group of teenagers facing the hardships of street life.

== Awards ==
- 2000, FIPRESCI Prize - Special Mention (For its ability to put real life on screen, and its extraordinary performances) at the Pusan International Film Festival
