= Chi-hwa-seon =

- Theatrical release poster
- Hangul: 취화선
- Hanja: 醉畫仙
- RR: Chwihwaseon
- MR: Ch'wihwasŏn
- Directed by: Im Kwon-taek
- Written by: Im Kwon-taek; Do-ol; Min Byeong-sam
- Produced by: Lee Tae-won
- Starring: Choi Min-sik; Ahn Sung-ki; Yoo Ho-jeong; Kim Yeo-jin; Son Ye-jin
- Cinematography: Jeong Il-seong
- Edited by: Park Sun-deok
- Music by: Kim Young-dong
- Distributed by: Cinema Service
- Release date: May 10, 2002
- Running time: 117 minutes
- Country: South Korea
- Language: Korean
- Box office: $6.9 million

Chi-hwa-seon or Chwi-hwa-seon (Korean: 취화선; also known as Painted Fire, Strokes of Fire or Drunk on Women and Poetry) is a 2002 South Korean historical drama film directed by Im Kwon-taek. It stars Choi Min-sik as Jang Seung-eop (commonly known by his pen name, Owon), a nineteenth-century Korean painter who changed the direction of Korean art.

The film was entered into the 2002 Cannes Film Festival, where Im Kwon-taek won Best Director, shared with Paul Thomas Anderson for Punch-Drunk Love.

In 2020, the film was ranked 13th by The Guardian among the classics of modern South Korean cinema.

== Plot ==
It begins with the Korean artist being suspicious of a Japanese art-lover who values his work. The story then goes back to his early years. Beginning as a vagabond with a talent for drawing, he has a talent for imitating other people's art, but is urged to go on and develop a style of his own. This process is painful and he often behaves very badly, getting drunk and being hostile to those who care about him and try to help him.

These events are set against the struggle for reform within Korea, caught between China and Japan (annexed by Japan in 1910, outside the film's time-frame).

== Cast ==
- Choi Min-sik as Jang Seung-eop
- Ahn Sung-ki as Kim Byeong-mun
- Yoo Ho-jeong as Mae-hyang
- Kim Yeo-jin as Jin-jong
- Son Ye-jin as So-un

== Reception ==
On the review aggregator website Rotten Tomatoes, 83% of 42 critics' reviews are positive. The website's consensus reads: "A fittingly artful biopic about the life of a brilliant painter, Chihwaseon offers an uncommonly compelling look at a singularly creative life." Metacritic, which uses a weighted average, assigned the film a score of 78 out of 100, based on 21 critics, indicating "generally favorable" reviews.

== Awards ==
Award	Category	Recipient(s)	Result	Ref.
23rd Blue Dragon Film Awards	Best Film	Chi-hwa-seon	Won	
23rd Blue Dragon Film Awards	Best Director	Im Kwon-taek	Won	
23rd Blue Dragon Film Awards	Best Leading Actor	Choi Min-sik	Nominated	
23rd Blue Dragon Film Awards	Best Supporting Actress	Kim Yeo-jin	Nominated	
23rd Blue Dragon Film Awards	Best Cinematography	Jung Il-sung	Won	
55th Cannes Film Festival	Palme d'Or	Im Kwon-taek	Nominated	
55th Cannes Film Festival	Best Director	Im Kwon-taek	Won	
Belgian Syndicate of Cinema Critics	Grand Prix	Im Kwon-taek	Won	
Camerimage	Golden Frog	Jung Il-sung	Nominated	
28th César Awards	Best Foreign Film	Chi-hwa-seon	Nominated	
3rd Busan Film Critics Awards	Best Supporting Actress	Kim Yeo-jin	Won	
3rd Busan Film Critics Awards	Best Cinematography	Jung Il-sung	Won	
Chicago International Film Festival	Gold Hugo	Im Kwon-taek	Nominated	
22nd Korean Association of Film Critics Awards	Best Cinematography	Jung Il-sung	Won	
