= Socialtainer =

Korean term for celebrities engaged in social issues

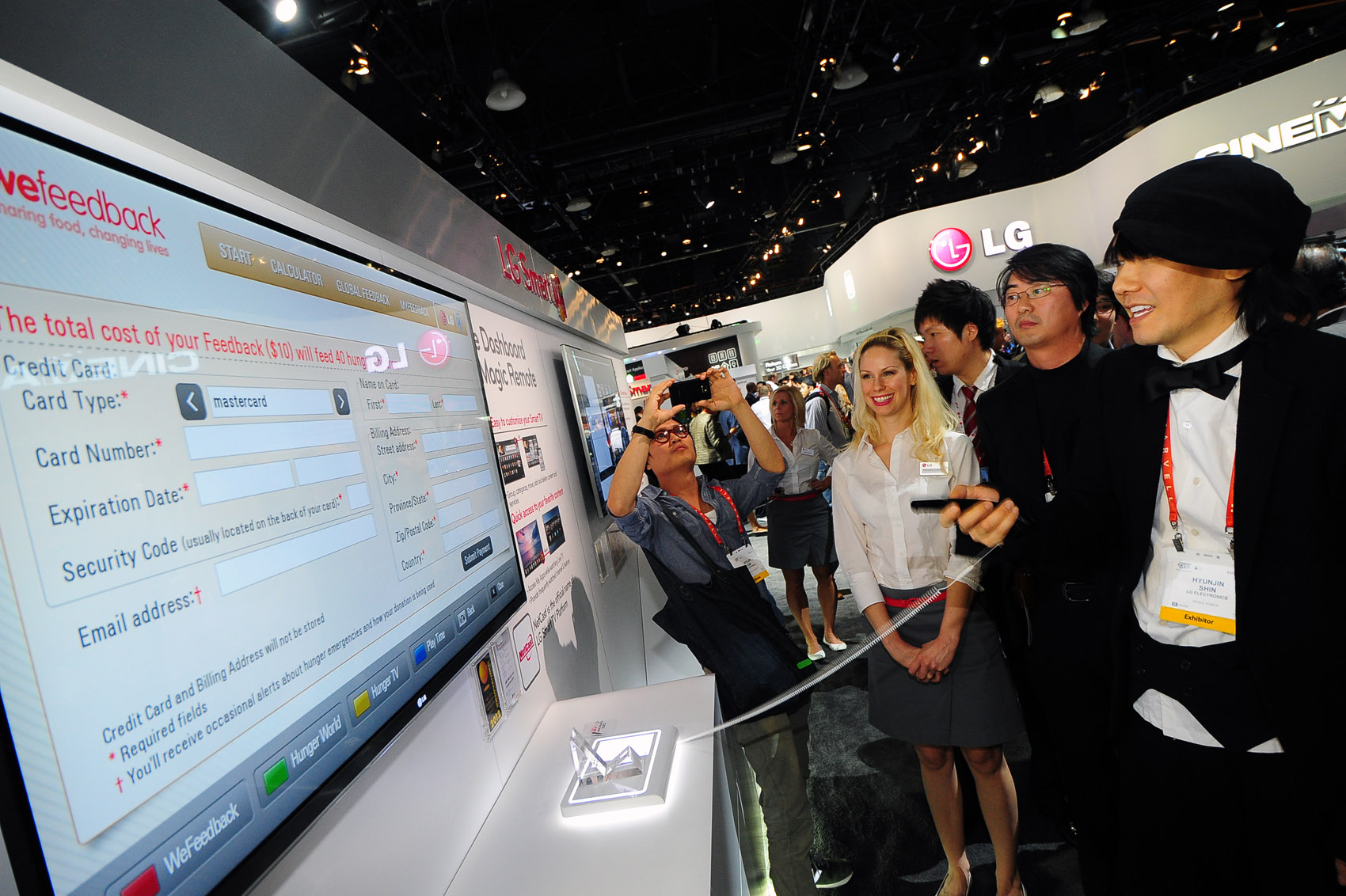
Popular socialtainer Kim Jang-hoon with new app for WFP and LG Electronics hunger and poverty relief, Las Vegas Valley, 2012.

Socialtainer (Korean: 소셜테이너) is the Korean-language term for an entertainer or celebrity who is invested in social issues. The word is used heavily in South Korean media, especially in newspapers, and show business.

== History ==
The term has been defined as "celebrities who are known primarily for their work and advocacy for social justice." The word is a compound of "social" and "entertainer."

In 2011, Korean English language media called socialtainer a buzzword in Korea, referring to a celebrity activist, and said the word was not in an English dictionary. Also, in that year, media made a distinction between the words socialtainer and "politainer" (politically active celebrities). However again in 2012, socialtainer was still defined by some media as "referring to entertainers who express their political ideas and give their opinions on social issues."

The academic world has taken more than one look at the word, and the phenomenon, from the perspective of the celebrity and the audiences they affect. At Dongguk University they compared it to the ranking of the real-time word search referring to the internet expression "bright entertainers" on social networking service (SNS) sites such as Twitter and Facebook. They say socialtainers are limited by their appeal and stimulation toward the public, and secondly, in their limited knowledge and carelessness in what they say in public and online; then delved further, discussing the question, "Why the power of socialtainers can be uncomfortable?"

== Controversy ==
On July 13, 2011, a controversy ensued, after one of the major Korean broadcast stations, MBC, banned appearances by socialtainers, including actress and activist Kim Yeo-jin, which expanded to a debate over whether it was appropriate for entertainers to use their celebrity to influence the public, using SNS sites, a popular communication among young people; and also, whether such media prohibitions was appropriate." A protest was held by active socialtainers, including writer Gong Ji-young, professors from Seoul National University, Sungkonghoe University, and the team leader of the People’s Solidarity for Participatory Democracy, who referenced the government's need to maintain "freedom of speech."

Celebrities in Korea are seen to be influential, but sharing their opinions on certain topics is something they monitor, due to media and "netizen" scrutiny. Some who were reported to receive a backlash involving "contentious issues" were Broadcaster Kim Mi-hwa, who was suspended from her radio program, and entertainer Kim Je-dong and rocker Yoon Do-hyun who were banned from appearing on televised programs.

== Celebrities who are called socialtainers ==
- Singer Lee Seung-chul is a well-known "Dokdo is Korea" advocate.
- Comedian Kim Je-dong, is a political liberal who hosted conservative party head President Park Geun-hye on television.
- Singer Lee Hyori, called a forerunner of the craze, gave up meat to become a vegetarian. In December 2014, she gave her public support of laid off workers at SsangYong Motor on Twitter, announcing that she wanted to see the new car Tivoli sell well so they would be hired again, adding that, if it happened, she would dance in front of the car in a bikini.
- Rapper Sean, sometimes mistaken for a social worker (active with YG Entertainment charity work), and his wife, actress Jung Hye-young, donate to hospitals and charities.
- Actor Cha In-pyo and his wife Shin Ae-ra, called two of the most influential advocates, are active with Compassion International and North Korean refugee rights.
- Actor and Director Yoo Ji-tae has drawn attention to the mistreatment of women.

A June 2012 news report listed the results of a poll by Panelnow, which asked about 20,000 people, "Who is the socialtainer that best represents Korea?" Thirty percent of the respondents voted for male broadcaster Kim Je-dong, followed by male singer Kim Jang-hoon, actress Lee Hyori, and actress Kim Yeo-jin.
