= Miru Kim =

American photographer

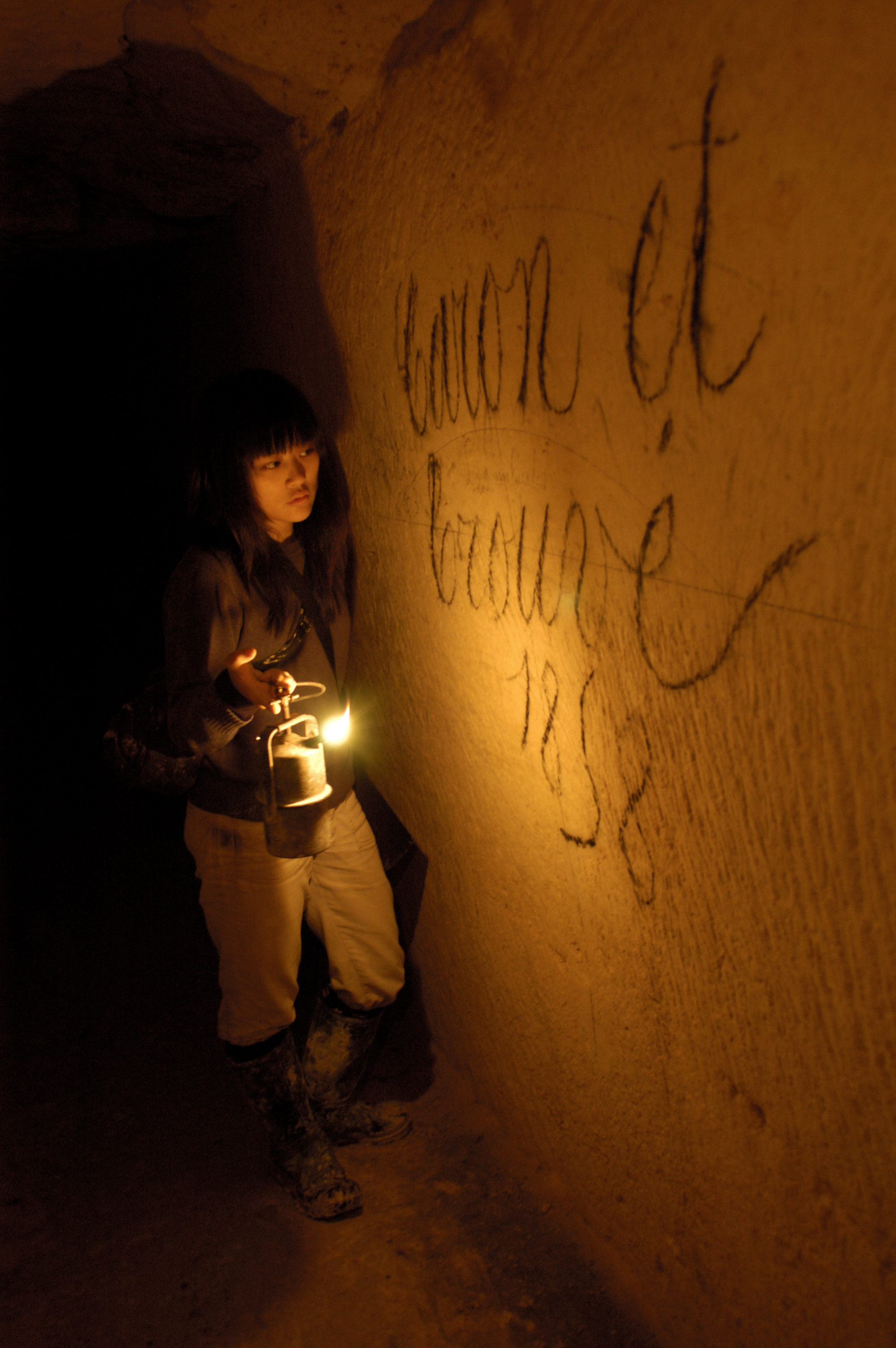
- Miru Kim exploring the Paris Catacombs
- Born: February 20, 1981 (age 45); Stoneham, Massachusetts, US
- Education: Columbia University; Pratt Institute
- Known for: Photography, illustration, urban exploration
- Website: www.mirukim.com

Miru Kim is an artist, photographer, illustrator, and arts events coordinator, who has explored, documented, and photographed various urban settings such as abandoned subway stations, tunnels, the Croton aqueduct, Paris catacombs, factories, hospitals, and shipyards.

She is the daughter of Korean public philosopher Do-ol.

== Early life and education ==
Kim is the daughter of contemporary South Korean philosopher Young-Oak Kim (aka Do-ol). She was born in Stoneham, Massachusetts in 1981 but was raised in Seoul, Korea. She returned to Massachusetts in 1995 to attend Phillips Academy in Andover, and later moved to New York City in 1999 to attend Columbia University. In 2006, she received an MFA in painting from Pratt Institute.

== Career ==
Kim's Naked City Spleen series of photographs include images of herself nude in these settings. For the series The Pig That Therefore I Am, she visited industrial hog farms and immersed herself amongst the pigs.

She was included in Esquire's 2007 Best and Brightest issue. The Financial Times included Kim in an article titled "We'll climb that bridge when we get to it" about urban explorers.

== See also ==
- Ruins photography
