= Chang Sŭngŏp =

Korean painter (1843–1897)

- Korean name
- Hangul: 장승업
- Hanja: 張承業
- RR: Jang Seungeop
- MR: Chang Sŭngŏp

Art name
- Hangul: 오원
- Hanja: 吾園
- RR: Owon
- MR: Owŏn

Courtesy name
- Hangul: 경유
- Hanja: 景猶
- RR: Gyeongyu
- MR: Kyŏngyu

Chang Sŭngŏp (Korean: 장승업; 1843–1897), commonly known by his art name Owŏn, was a Korean painter of the late Joseon period.

He was one of the few painters to hold a position of rank in the Joseon court. His life was dramatized in the award-winning 2002 film Chi-hwa-seon directed by Im Kwon-taek.

== Biography ==
Chang was orphaned at a young age and grew up in poverty. He stayed at the homes of a number of people, including Yi Ŭnghŏn (이응헌; 李應憲), Pyŏn Wŏn-kyu (변원규; 卞元圭), and O Kyŏngsŏk, where he was exposed to art.

Together with the earlier painters Danwon and Hyewon, Chang is remembered today as one of the "Three Wons" of Joseon-period painting.

== Gallery ==
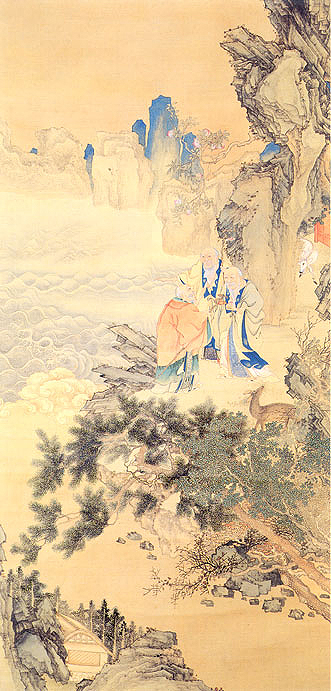
Samin munnyeondo

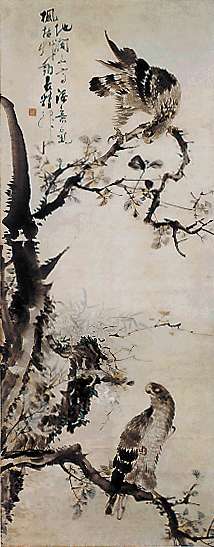
Hochwido

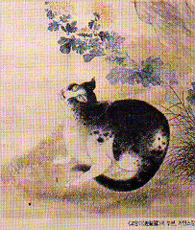
Painting of a cat by Chang

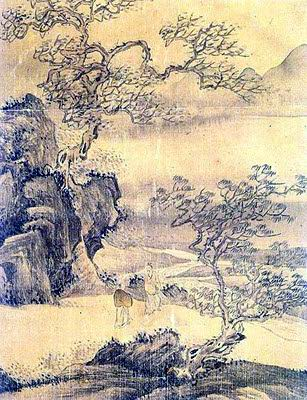
Sansu inmuldo means "the picture of a man in the landscape"

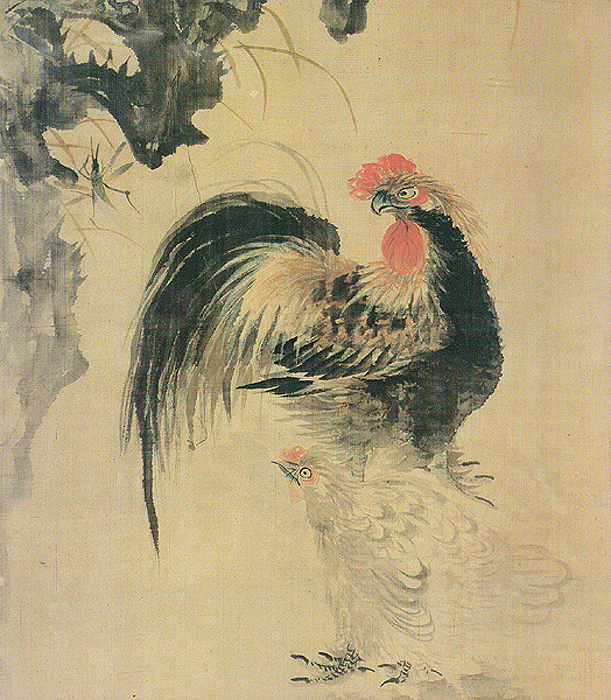
Rooster

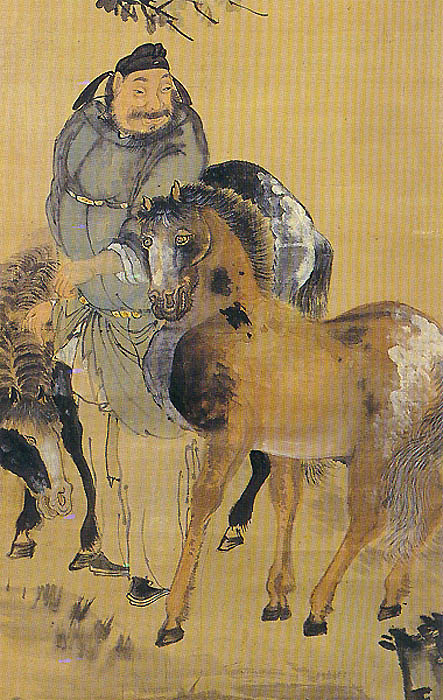
Ssangma inmuldo (the painting of a man with two horses)

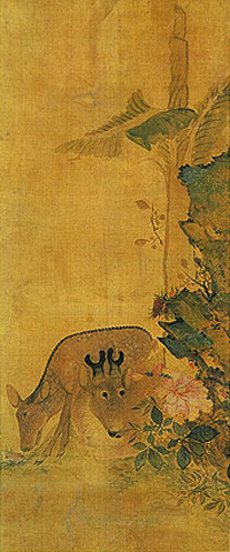
Chowon jirok

== See also ==
- Korean art
- Korean culture
- Korean painting
- List of Korean painters
