= Do-ol =

South Korean philosopher (born 1948)

Do-ol Kim Yong-ok
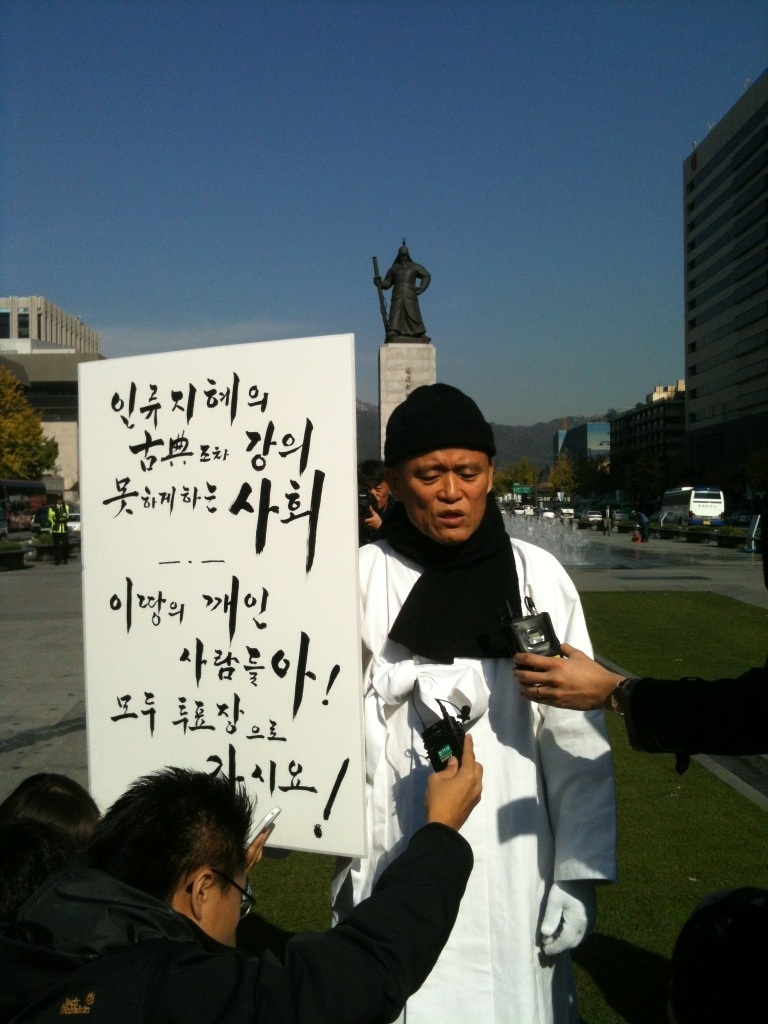
- Kim in Gwanghwamun Plaza, October 26, 2011
- Born: June 14, 1948 (age 78); Cheonan, South Korea
- Education: Korea University (BPhil); National Taiwan University (MA); University of Tokyo (MPhil); Harvard University (PhD); Wonkwang University (DOM)
- Occupations: philosopher; screenwriter; filmmaker; professor emeritus of Chung-ang University
- Years active: 1985–present

Korean name
- Hangul: 김용옥
- Hanja: 金容沃
- RR: Gim Yongok
- MR: Kim Yongok

Art name
- Hangul: 도올
- Hanja: 檮杌
- RR: Dool
- MR: Tool

Kim Yong-ok (Korean: 김용옥; born June 14, 1948) is a South Korean philosopher. His art name is Do-ol. His name is sometimes rendered as To-ol Kim Young-oak.

== Career and education ==
Kim Yong-ok was born June 14, 1948, in Cheonan.

Once a leading professor of the Oriental Classics at Korea University, Kim became a Doctor of Oriental Medicine, a playwright and movie-director, and is now professor emeritus of Chung-ang University. He lectures on KBS TV on his modern interpretations of classical Daoism (Lao-tzu), the Analects of Confucius, and Zen Buddhism (the Diamond Sutra).

Kim graduated from Korea University with a bachelor's degree in philosophy. He received master's degrees at both the National Taiwan University and the University of Tokyo. He received his Ph.D. from Harvard University, his paper being about Wang Fuzhi. He also received a Doctor of Oriental Medicine from Wonkwang University.

== Lawsuit ==
In June 2019, Kim was sued for defamation by the family of former president Syngman Rhee for his speeches on his talk show Do-ol Ah-in Going All Directions, where he allegedly called Rhee a puppet of the United States and the Soviet Union who was responsible for the Division of Korea and the mass murder of Jeju people in the Jeju Uprising.

== Personal life ==
Kim has one daughter, Miru Kim, who works as an artist, photographer, and arts events coordinator.

== Filmography ==
=== TV lecture show ===
Year	Title	Role	Note
1994	Story Show Meeting: What is Learning?	Lecturer	1 episode
1997	Special Lecture: How Are You?	Lecturer	1 episode
November 1999 - February 2000	Laozi and the 21st Century	Lecturer	56 episodes
October 2000 - May 2001	Do-ol's Analects Stories	Lecturer	64 episodes
August - November 2002	Do-ol, Engaging With India	Lecturer	28 episodes
January - May 2004	Special Korean Philosophy Lectures, Who We Are	Lecturer	26 episodes
September 2004	Special Morning Lecture: Do-ol Kim Yong-ok, Rapper Debut?	Lecturer	1 episode
January - May 2006	Special Lectures: Discoursing About History	Lecturer	6 episodes
July 2007	Farewell Interview: Do-ol Kim Yong-ok	Lecturer	1 episode
October 2007	KBS Special: North-South Summit Special Plan	Lecturer	1 episode
December 2007	The President Who the People Want	Lecturer	1 episode
November 2011 - January 2012	Special Lectures: '중용, 인간의 맛	Lecturer	36 episodes
2013	Story Show: Pounding	Lecturer	1 episode
February - April 2016	Special Lectures: China is Do-ol	Lecturer	12 episodes
2018	Special Lectures: Do-ol Stop	Lecturer	1 episode
January - March 2019	Special Talk Show: Do-ol Ah-in Going All Directions	Lecturer; Co-host with actor Yoo Ah-in	12 episodes
March 2020	Special Talk Show: Do-ol School Babbling Sung-chul	Lecturer; Co-host with singer Lee Seung-chul	12 episodes

=== TV documentary ===
Year	Title	Role	Note
December 2004 - August 2005	Dool's Korean Independence Movement	Director, host	10 episodes

=== Film ===
Year	Title	Role	Note
2002	Chi-hwa-seon (Painted Fire)	Screenwriter	
2016	Goguryeo	Director	Documentary film

== See also ==
- Miru Kim

== Bibliography ==
- Hyegang Choe Han-gi wa Yugyo / Tool Kim Yong-ok. Soul-si : Tongnamu, 2004. (Series: Kim, Yong-ok, Selections. 2003; 3.) LCCN B5254.C54K538
- 동양학 어떻게 할 것인가 / minumsa, 1985.
- 여자란 무엇인가 / Tongnamu, 1986.
- 중고생을 위한 철학강의 / Tongnamu,
- 절차탁마 대기만성 / Tongnamu,
- 독기학설 / Tongnamu,
- 백두산 신곡, 기철학 강론 / Tongnamu,
- 기철학 산조 / Tongnamu,
- 노자철학 이것이다 / Tongnamu,
- 신한국기 / Tongnamu,
- 대화 / Tongnamu,
- 석도화론 / Tongnamu,
- 건강하세요 / Tongnamu,
- 너와 나의 한의학 / Tongnamu,
- 기옹은 이렇게 말했다 / Tongnamu,
- 태권도 철학의 구성원리 / Tongnamu,
- 새춘향뎐 / Tongnamu,
- 시나리오 장군의 아들 / Tongnamu,
- 천명 개벽 / Tongnamu,
- 화두 혜능과 세익스피어 / Tongnamu,
- 도올세설 / Tongnamu,
- 금강경강해 / Tongnamu, 1999
- 노자와 21세기 1,2,3 / Tongnamu, 1999
- 도올 논어 1,2,3 / Tongnamu, 2001
- 요한복음 강해 / Tongnamu, 2007
- 기독교 성서의 이해 / Tongnamu, 2007
- 큐복음서 / Tongnamu, 2009
- 계림수필 / Tongnamu, 2010
- 논어 역주 / Tongnamu, 2009
- 효경 역주 / Tongnamu, 2009
- 맹자-사람의 길 1,2-상,하 / Tongnamu, 2012
- 대학, 학기 역주 / Tongnamu, 2010
- 중용역주 / Tongnamu, 2011
- 중용 인간의 맛 / Tongnamu, 2011
- 사랑하지 말자 / Tongnamu, 2012
- 도올의 아침놀 / Tongnamu, 2012
- 도올의 교육 입국론 / Tongnamu, 2015
- 도올, 시진핑을 말하다 / Tongnamu, 2016
- 박원순과 도올 국가를 말하다 / Tongnamu, 2016
- 도올의 로마서 강해-A Commentary on the Epistle of Paul to the Romans / Tongnamu, 2017
