= The Rapist =

2021 Indian film by Aparna Sen

- Official poster
- Directed by: Aparna Sen
- Screenplay by: Aparna Sen
- Produced by: Sameer Nair; Deepak Segal; Suchhanda Chatterjee; Shubha Shetty
- Starring: Konkona Sen Sharma; Arjun Rampal; Tanmay Dhanania
- Cinematography: Ayananka Bose
- Edited by: Rabiranjan Maitra
- Production companies: Applause Entertainment; Quest Films
- Release date: 7 October 2021 (BIFF)
- Running time: 132 minutes
- Country: India
- Language: Hindi

The Rapist is a 2021 Indian Hindi drama film, written and directed by Aparna Sen, that premiered at 26th Busan International Film Festival. A Quest Films Pvt. Ltd. production, produced under the banner of Applause Entertainment, stars Konkona Sen Sharma, Arjun Rampal and Tanmay Dhanania. The film chronicles the journey of three protagonists, whose lives are interlaced because of one horrific incident.

== Cast ==
- Konkona Sen Sharma as Naina Malik
- Arjun Rampal as Aftab Malik
- Tanmay Dhanania as Prasad Singh
- Ashok Chhabra as Naina's Father
- Anindita Bose as Malini, colleague of Naina
- Harleen Rekhi
- Gitanjali Rao as rapist's mother
- Vijay Kumar Dogra as police inspector
- Chetan Sharma as Latif, slum gang leader
- Sukesh Arora as Subhash, Aftab's lawyer friend
- Semma Azmi as Savitri, Naina's maid
- Devika Prasad as Nurse in Nursing Home

== Production ==
Aparna Sen while writing script for her 3rd Hindi film The Rapist, said "What drew me to this is the psychology of the three main protagonists. Stripping off the layers and carefully built up facades to get to the real person underneath is quite a challenge and a fascinating process." Pre-production work of the film began in February 2021 with finalization of cast and producers. The filmmaker Aparna Sen in her pre-production interview said, The Rapist will be a “hard-hitting drama that examines how much of society is responsible for producing rapists.” Principal photography began in early March 2021 in Delhi. Arjun Rampal finished his part of shooting in the 3rd week of March. The film was wrapped up in first week of April 2021.

== Release ==
The Rapist had its premiere at 26th Busan International Film Festival on 7 October 2021, under the 'A Window on Asian Cinema' section, where it was a joint winner of the Kim Jiseok award, alongside the 2021 Philippine Japanese sports biographical film Gensan Punch.

== Reception ==
Richard Kuipers of Variety praising the direction of Aparna Sen wrote, "One of the best works directed by veteran filmmaker-actor Aparna Sen". And appreciating screenplay he wrote, "The great strength of Sen’s screenplay is the realistic manner in which it depicts Naina and Aftab’s reactions to events that challenge firmly held beliefs and threaten their marriage." Kuipers opined about the film, “The Rapist is a deeply affecting portrait of personal trauma and an intelligent examination of social and cultural factors fueling the horrifying prevalence of sexual violence in India." Criticizing visuals of the film, he said, "The only real imperfections to the film are visual, with some scenes being drained of most color for no immediately apparent reason."

== Awards and nominations ==
Year	Award	Category	Recipient/ Nominee	Result	Ref.
2021	26th Busan International Film Festival	Kim Jiseok award	The Rapist	Won	
2022	Indian Film Festival of Melbourne	Best film	The Rapist	Nominated	
2022	Indian Film Festival of Melbourne	Best Performance (Female) Feature	Konkona Sen Sharma	Nominated	
2022	Indian Film Festival of Melbourne	Best director	Aparna Sen	Won	
2022	International Film Festival of Kerala			Special Screening	
