= Heaven: To the Land of Happiness =

2020 South Korean film by Im Sang-soo

- Festival poster
- Hangul: 헤븐: 행복의 나라로
- Lit.: To the Land of Happiness
- RR: Hebeun: haengbogui nararo
- MR: Hebŭn: haengbogŭi nararo
- Directed by: Im Sang-soo
- Written by: Im Sang-soo
- Produced by: Kim Won-guk
- Starring: Choi Min-sik; Park Hae-il
- Cinematography: Kim Tae-kyung
- Edited by: Jung Eun-eun; Kim Hyung-joo
- Music by: Kim Hong-jip
- Production company: Hive Media Corp.
- Distributed by: Lotte Entertainment
- Release date: 6 October 2021 (Busan)
- Running time: 99 minutes
- Country: South Korea
- Language: Korean

Heaven: To the Land of Happiness (Korean: 헤븐: 행복의 나라로; lit. 'To the Land of Happiness') is a 2021 South Korean drama film directed by Im Sang-soo, starring Choi Min-sik and Park Hae-il. It was selected to be shown at the 2020 Cannes Film Festival. The project was initially intended to be a remake of the 1997 German film Knockin' on Heaven's Door, but director Im changed many things and wrote his own script, leaving Knockin' on Heaven's Door to be considered inspiration rather than a remake.

== Premise ==
A road movie depicting what happens between a prison escapee named '203' who has no time and a patient named Nam-sik who has no money, who accidentally acquire a large amount of money and become special companions while dreaming of a splendid ending to their lives.

== Cast ==
- Choi Min-sik as 203, a person who is sentenced to a limited period of prison time and undertakes a passionate escape in search of the last happiness of his life. His prisoner number is '203'.
- Park Hae-il as Nam-sik, a patient who unexpectedly joins 203's special trip
- Jo Han-chul as Kang-du, a mysterious figure who chases 203 and Nam-sik to retrieve lost money
- Im Sung-jae as Dong-chi
- Youn Yuh-jung as Mrs. Yoon, a gorgeous and unique lady from Pyeongchang-dong
- Lee El as Kim Byeon, Mrs. Yoon's daughter
- Kim Yeo-jin
- Yoon Je-moon
- Jung Min-sung
- Noh Susanna
- Lee Jae-in

== Production ==
Principal photography began in July 2019 and ended in October 2019.

== Release ==
This film was invited for 'The Faithful' section at the 73rd Cannes Film Festival held from 12 to 23 May 2020. It was also screened as opening film of 26th Busan International Film Festival on 6 October 2021. It will be screened as closing film of the 16th London Korean Film Festival to be held from 4 to 19 November. It has also been invited to the 18th Hong Kong-Asia Film Festival to be held from 27 October to 14 November. It was released in South Korea in 2025.
