= Do-ol Ah-in Going All Directions =

2019 South Korean talk show

- Promotional release poster
- Also known as: Do-ol Ah-in Go In All Directions; Dool Ain Ohbangganda; Doolain
- 도올아인 오방간다
- Genre: Culture Talk show
- Presented by: Do-ol Kim Yong-ok; Yoo Ah-in
- Country of origin: South Korea
- Original language: Korean
- No. of episodes: 12

Production
- Production location: South Korea
- Running time: 60 minutes
- Production company: Korean Broadcasting System

Original release
- Network: KBS1
- Release: January 5 – March 23, 2019

Do-ol Ah-in Going All Directions, also known as Do-ol Ah-in Go In All Directions, is a 2019 South Korean culture talk show program on Korean Broadcasting System presented by actor Yoo Ah-in and contemporary Korean philosopher Do-ol Kim Yong-ok. It aired on KBS1 on Saturdays at 20:00 (KST) from 5 January to 23 March 2019 for 12 episodes.

== Overview ==
Do-ol Ah-in Going All Directions is a hybrid of lecture and variety program that reinterprets a hundred years of modern and contemporary history of Korea that transcends the past and future, and communicates through generations and genders.

It was created as a special project to commemorate the 100th anniversary of the establishment of the Provisional Government of the Republic of Korea and the March First Movement. The title "오방간다" (Oh-bang-gan-da) is derived from the Cardinal direction, and refers to 'all directions' and 'joyful and excited state'. The title was created by Yoo Ah-in, and he directly participated in the planning, co-writing and co-directing each episode, including casting the performers.

== Format ==
A new concept of hybrid variety show made by unexpected combination of professor Kim Yong-ok (pen name: Do-ol), actor Yoo Ah-in and folklore singer Lee Hee-moon. Each episode brings different topics related to history, culture, social-politics and current affairs. The talk show takes Korean theatre style and emphasizes impromptu elements or improvisations given by Yoo Ah-in and Do-ol that involves the audience and musicians. The talk show opens with audience survey, then a lecture from Do-ol, follows by Yoo Ah-in's personal stories and experiences, and opinion-sharing with audience. Lee Hee-moon performs Korean folk music in the program's opening and closing.

== Cast ==
- Do-ol Kim Yong-ok - Presenter
- Yoo Ah-in - Presenter
- Lee Hee-moon - Singer, Obang-shin ('the god of five-directions')
- Prelude - Jazz band

== List of Do-ol Ah-in Going All Directions episode ==
Episodes	Broadcast Date	Title	Topic	Rating
1	5 January	Why are We Here Now?	Prologue	3.9%
2	12 January	We are All Special Beings	Choe Je-u, Donghak, equality	3.3%
3	19 January	Live Together in the World	Choe Si-hyeong, Donghak, gender equality, child rights	2.7%
4	26 January	Do You Love Korea?	Ahn Jung-geun, patriotism	3.4%
5	2 February	Knowledge is the Nation's Power	Ahn Chang-ho, education	3.0%
6	9 February	We Can Change the World	Lyuh Woon-hyung, participation, expression	3.7%
7	16 February	We are Independent People	Choe Nam-seon, Declaration of Independence	2.7%
8	23 February	Don't Forget Me, Hong Beom-do	Hong Beom-do, Battle of Chingshanli and Bongo-dong	2.6%
9	2 March	Act As You Know, Yun Bong-gil	Yun Bong-gil, independence activist	2.4%
10	9 March	Let Me Have No Shame, Yun Dong-ju	Yun Dong-ju, resistance poetry	2.4%
11	16 March	Liberation And Trust For Full Independence	Syngman Rhee, reunification	2.5%
12	23 March	Beyond Conflict And Peace	Jeju Uprising, Yeo-Sun Incident	3.4%

(Ratings: Nielsen Korea provided)

- This talk show program aired on KBS1 which is commercial-free.
