= Girls' Night Out (1998 film) =

- Theatrical poster
- Hangul: 처녀들의 저녁식사
- Hanja: 處女들의 저녁食事
- RR: Cheonyeodeurui jeonyeoksiksa
- MR: Ch'ŏnyŏdŭrŭi chŏnyŏksiksa
- Directed by: Im Sang-soo
- Written by: Im Sang-soo
- Produced by: Cha Seung-jae
- Starring: Jin Hee-kyung; Cho Jae-hyun; Kang Soo-yeon; Kim Yeo-jin; Sul Kyung-gu
- Cinematography: Hong Kyung-pyo
- Edited by: Kyung Min-ho
- Music by: Moon Joon-ho
- Production companies: Uno Film; Sidus
- Release date: 1998
- Running time: 101 minutes
- Country: South Korea
- Language: Korean

Girls' Night Out (Korean: 처녀들의 저녁식사) is a South Korean erotic drama film, released in 1998 and directed by Im Sang-soo. It centers around three women, whose overt sexual dialogue caused a stir when the film was released.

== Plot ==
The three main heroines are best friends each working in different professions: hotel, designing company and graduate student. They boldly talk to each other about sex, but their thoughts on the subject are definitely different. From this, alteration of their lives begins, with each engaging in different types of sexual relationships.

== Cast ==
- Jin Hee-kyung as Yeon
- Kang Soo-yeon as Ho-jung
- Shin Cheol-jin as Real estate mister
- Kim Yeo-jin as Soon
