= Wang Hsin =

Taiwanese photographer (born 1942)

- Born: March 17, 1942; Lukang Changhua County, Taiwan
- Education: Tokyo University of Agriculture, Tokyo School of Photography
- Occupation: Photographer

Wang Hsin (Chinese:王信; born 17 March 1942) is a Taiwanese photographer who has made both documentary and fine art work. Motivated by humanitarian concerns, she documented "Taiwan's rapidly vanishing native traditions and indigenous cultures" in the 1970s and 1980s. In 2016/17 she had a retrospective exhibition at Taipei Fine Arts Museum, where her series A Trip to Wushe is held in its collection. Wang now lives in Portland, Oregon, USA.

== Early life and education ==
Wang was born in Lukang, Changhua County, Central Taiwan and grew up in Taichung. She studied animal sciences at Pingtung Agricultural College in 1964. Wang's first job was as a teacher in Wushe, a remote aboriginal township in Nantou County. Later, she moved to Japan for two years to continue studying in the Department of Animal Science at Tokyo University of Agriculture, graduating in 1970. While in Japan, she became interested in photography and gave up a second degree in animal sciences to study photography at the Department of Commercial Photography at Tokyo School of Photography, graduating in 1972.

== Life and work ==
Wang has made both documentary photography, in black and white, and fine art photography, primarily in colour.

"Motivated by her humanitarian concerns", she has documented "Taiwan's rapidly vanishing native traditions and indigenous cultures". From 1972 to 1973, she photographed the Seediq people of Wushe, producing the series A Trip to Wushe. From 1974 to 1975, she photographed the Tao people of Orchid Island, producing the series Farewell, Orchid Island. Between 1975 and 1982 she photographed various figures in Taiwanese arts and letters, producing the series On Portraits. Between 1979 and 1989 she documented the traditional lifestyle of the Penghu or Pescadores Islands, producing the series The Folklife of Penghu.

== Publications ==
=== Publications by Wang ===
- 台灣攝影家群象 = Aspects & Visions. Taiwan Photographers. 1989. ISBN 9789576300059.
- Line of Vision—The Photography of Wang Hsin. Taipei: Taipei Fine Arts Museum, 2016. Exhibition catalogue.

=== Publications with contributions by Wang ===
- Women Adventurers: five eras of Taiwanese art, 1930–1983 = 台湾现. Edited by Lei, Yi-ting. Taipei: Taipei Fine Arts Museum, 2013. ISBN 9789860394795. Exhibition catalogue.

== Exhibitions ==
=== Solo exhibitions ===
- Line of Vision—The Photography of Wang Hsin, Taipei Fine Arts Museum, Taipei City, Taiwan, October 2016 – March 2017. A retrospective, curated by Yi-ting Lei.

=== Group exhibitions ===
- Women Adventurers: Five Eras of Taiwanese Art, 1930–1983, Taipei Fine Arts Museum, June–September 2013

== Collections ==
Wang's work is held in the following permanent collection:

- Taipei Fine Arts Museum, Taipei City, Taiwan: 48 prints from the series A Trip to Wushe
