= Im Sang-soo =

South Korean film director (born 1962)

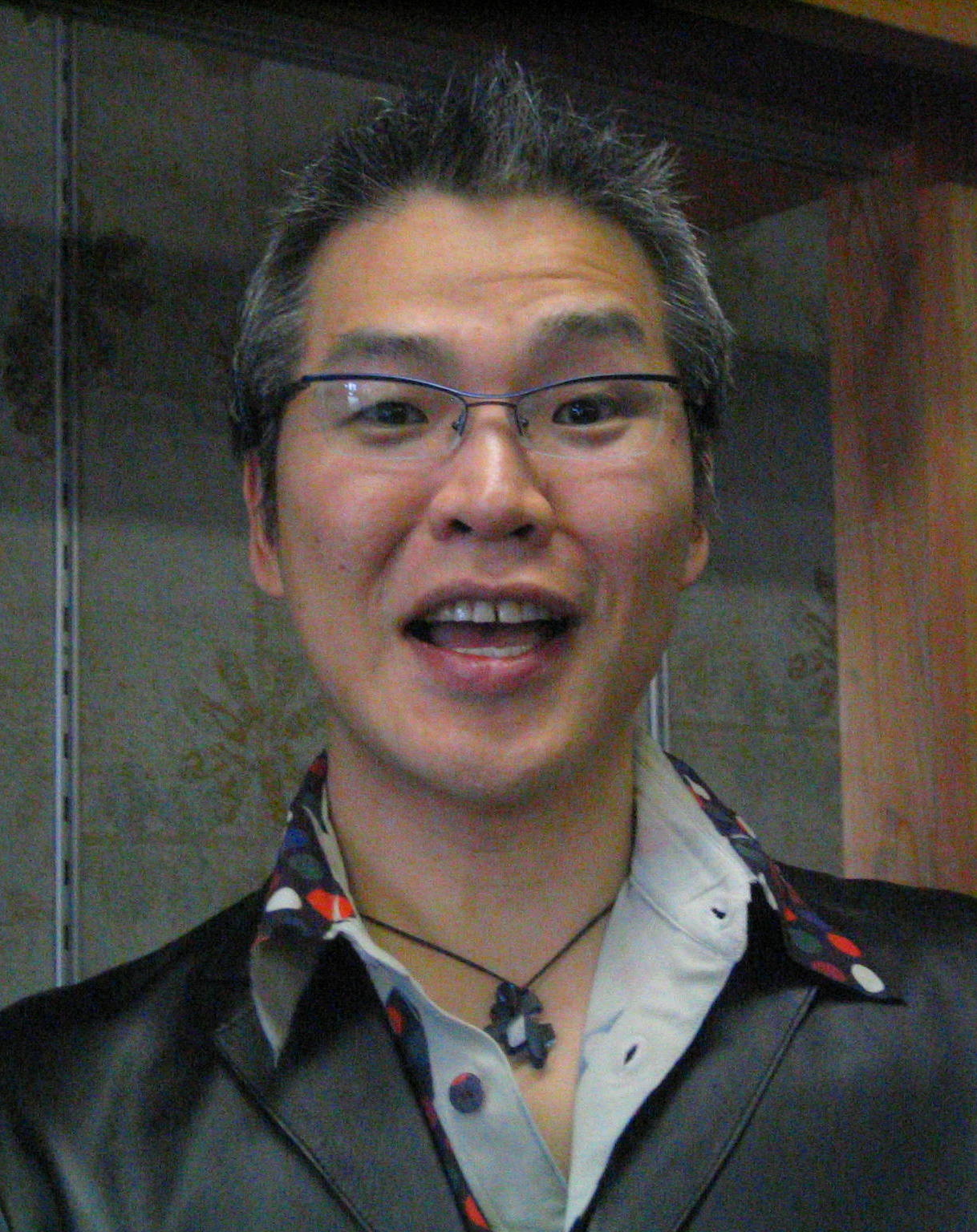
- Im in 2004
- Born: April 27, 1962 (age 64); Seoul, South Korea
- Occupations: Film director, screenwriter
- Years active: 1989–present

Korean name
- Hangul: 임상수
- Hanja: 林常樹
- RR: Im Sangsu
- MR: Im Sangsu

Im Sang-soo (Korean: 임상수; born April 27, 1962) is a South Korean film director and screenwriter. He has twice been invited to compete for the Palme d'Or at the Cannes Film Festival: first for The Housemaid in 2010, and then The Taste of Money in 2012.

== Early life and film career ==
Im was born in Seoul. He studied sociology at Yonsei University in Seoul before making a move to the Korean Academy of Film Arts (KAFA) in 1989. He began working in film that same year, landing his first job as Park Jeong-won's assistant director on Kuro Arirang (was coincidentally also the first film of actor Choi Min-sik).

Following graduation from KAFA, Im worked as an assistant director under Kim Young-bin on Kim's War (1994). In 1995 Im wrote the screenplay for The Eternal Empire, and also the screenplay A Noteworthy Film, which won him the Creation Prix at the Korean Motion Picture Promotion Scenario Competition.

In 1998 Im landed his first directorial gig. Girls' Night Out, a drama about three women in Korea, caused a controversy upon release due to the frank and sexually driven dialogue and has received mixed, almost polarized, reviews.

Tears, a hard drama about the lives of four runaway teenagers in Seoul, came next. Im spent five months in the Garibong-dong district of Seoul amongst homeless runaway teens before writing the script for the film. This film was shot in 2000 on miniDV to save the budget. To achieve greater realism, Im opted to use non-actors.

2003's Good Lawyer's Wife was Im's first film to reach #1 at the South Korean box office, thanks in large part to the suggestive poster and trailer campaign centered on star Moon So-ri (who was cast after Kim Hye-soo dropped out to pursue a TV career). This film was also screened in the main competition program at the 2003 Venice International Film Festival.

Next in Im's string of controversial films was 2005's President's Last Bang, about the night President Park Chung Hee was assassinated by his KCIA Director. The controversy started before it was released to the public (a press screening had already been held), with President Park's family suing MK Pictures over the film's content. A Korean court ordered the removal of 3 minutes and 50 seconds' worth of documentary footage from the film as it was thought the documentary footage might confuse the public into thinking the film was based on hard facts, which Im admits is not the case.

The Old Garden, Im's fifth film, was released theatrically in fall 2006. It debuted at the 2006 San Sebastián Film Festival. His 2010 film, The Housemaid, competed for the Palme d'Or at the 2010 Cannes Film Festival. In 2012 The Taste of Money competed for the Palme d'Or at the 2012 Cannes Film Festival.

Actress Youn Yuh-jung, a constant collaborator, has noted that "many actors shy away from working with him because he is provocative and daring, but that is how he views the world".

== Controversy ==
All of Im's films have been controversial, but his film The President's Last Bang, centered on the assassination of Park Chung Hee, has been the most controversial due to its negative portrayal of the Korean president. In 2005 a South Korean court ordered the removal of 3 minutes and 50 seconds of the film before it could be shown to the public. The offending scenes were made up of documentary footage, part of which showed President Park's funeral.

In August 2006 this ruling was overturned, with the court confirming the "right of free expression concerning the depiction of public historical figures". The court has also ordered MK Pictures, the production company that had financed the film, to pay President Park's family 100 million won (roughly US$105,000).

The film has been released in South Korea and America on DVD in 2005. Both discs contain a plain black screen where the footage was removed. There has been no release date set for a DVD containing the cut footage. However, the British and French releases contain the fully uncut version.

== Filmography ==
=== Feature films ===
Year	Film	Credited as			Notes
Year	Film	Director	Writer	Producer	Notes
1994	The Eternal Empire		Yes		
1994	The Pirates			Yes	
1998	Girls' Night Out	Yes	Yes		
2000	Tears	Yes	Yes		
2001	Indian Summer		Yes		
2003	A Good Lawyer's Wife	Yes	Yes		
2005	The President's Last Bang	Yes	Yes		
2006	The Old Garden	Yes	Yes		
2010	The Housemaid	Yes	Yes		
2012	The Taste of Money	Yes	Yes	Yes	
2015	Intimate Enemies	Yes	Yes		
2021	Heaven: To the Land of Happiness	Yes	Yes		

=== Short films ===
Year	Film	Segment	Credited as	
Year	Film	Segment	Director	Writer
2014	Rio, I Love You	O Vampiro do Rio	Yes	Yes
2015	Color of Asia - Masters	The Vampire Lives Next Door	Yes	Yes

== Awards and nominations ==
A Noteworthy Film

- 1995, Creation Prix at the Korean Motion Picture Promotion Scenario Competition

Tears

- 2000, FIPRESCI Prize – Special Mention (For its ability to put real life on screen, and its extraordinary performances) at the Pusan International Film Festival
- 2001, Nominated for Best International Feature Film at the Torino International Festival of Young Cinema
- 2001, Nominated for the Bronze Horse at the Stockholm Film Festival

A Good Lawyer's Wife

- 2003, Best Actress (Moon So-ri) at the Stockholm Film Festival
- 2003, Best Cinematography (Kim Woo-hyung) at the Stockholm Film Festival
- 2003, Silver Spur Prize at the Flanders International Film Festival
- 2003, Nominated for the Golden Lion at the Venice International Film Festival
- 2004, Lotus Prize at the Deauville Asian Film Festival
- 2004, Best Actress (Moon So-ri) at the Grand Bell Awards, South Korea

The President's Last Bang

- 2005, Lino Brocka Award at the Cinemanila International Film Festival
- 2005, Best Film at the Baeksang Arts Awards, South Korea
- 2005, Nominated for Best Director at the Baeksang Arts Awards, South Korea
- 2005, Nominated for Best Screenplay at the Baeksang Arts Awards, South Korea
- 2005, Best Director at the Director's Cut Awards, South Korea

The Old Garden

- 2008, Nominated for Best Screenwriter at the Asian Film Awards

== See also ==
- List of South Korean film directors
- Cinema of Korea
